= List of Wisconsin circuit court judges =

The Wisconsin circuit courts were established by Article VII of the Constitution of Wisconsin, ratified May 8, 1848. There were originally five numbered circuit courts—each with one judge. In the first version of the constitution, and until 1853, the circuit court judges also served as the Wisconsin Supreme Court. The number of circuits was expanded via legislation as the population of the state grew, growing to 26 numbered circuits by 1965.

The modern circuit court system was established in 1977, when the Wisconsin Legislature enacted 1977 Wisconsin Act 187. The court reorganization was enabled by an amendment to the state constitution earlier that year. Act 187 combined the existing circuit court and county court systems to create a single level of trial courts. There are now 69 circuit courts in the state with 261 current judges. The circuit courts are organized into nine judicial administrative districts.

== Chief Judges (1978–Present) ==
District	Chief Judge	Beginning Year	End Year	Notes
1	Michael T. Sullivan	1978	1979	
1	Victor Manian	1979	1986	
1	Michael J. Barron	1986	1990	
1	Patrick T. Sheedy	1990	1999	
1	Michael Skwierawski	1999	2003	
1	Michael P. Sullivan	2003	2005	
1	Kitty K. Brennan	2005	2008	Appointed to Wisconsin Court of Appeals
1	Jeffrey Kremers	2008	2015	
1	Maxine Aldridge White	2015	2020	Appointed to Wisconsin Court of Appeals
1	Mary Triggiano	2020	2023	
1	Carl Ashley	2023		Current
2	John Ahlgrimm	1978	1984	
2	Michael Fisher	1984	1990	
2	Stephen A. Simanek	1990	1996	
2	Barbara A. Kluka	1996	2002	
2	Gerald P. Ptacek	2002	2008	
2	Mary K. Wagner	2008	2014	
2	Allan Torhorst	2014	2017	
2	Jason A. Rossell	2017	2024	
2	Wynne Laufenberg	2024		Current
3	Harold Wollenzien	1978	1985	
3	Patrick L. Snyder	1985	1991	
3	James B. Schwalbach	1991	1995	
3	Mark S. Gempeler	1995	2001	
3	Kathryn W. Foster	2001	2007	
3	J. Mac Davis	2007	2013	
3	Randy R. Koschnick	2013	2017	
3	Jennifer R. Dorow	2017	2023	
3	Paul Bugenhagen Jr.	2023		Current
4	Allan J. Deehr	1978	1984	
4	William E. Crane	1984	1990	
4	Hugh F. Nelson	1990	1992	
4	Thomas S. Williams	1992	1995	
4	Robert A. Haase	1995	2001	
4	L. Edward Stengel	2001	2007	
4	Darryl W. Deets	2007	2011	
4	Robert J. Wirtz	2011	2017	
4	Barbara Hart Key	2017	2022	
4	Guy D. Dutcher	2022		Current
5	Richard Bardwell	1978	1982	
5	Angela B. Bartell	1982	1988	
5	Robert R. Pekowsky	1988	1994	
5	Daniel R. Moeser	1994	2001	
5	Michael N. Nowakowski	2001	2007	
5	C. William Foust	2007	2013	
5	James P. Daley	2013	2019	
5	William E. Hanrahan	2019	2020	
5	Thomas J. Vale	2020	2024	
5	Julie Genovese	2024		Current
6	Henry G. Gergen Jr.	1978	1985	
6	Frederick A. Fink	1985	1985	Died in office
6	David C. Willis	1985	1986	Acting
6	Jon P. Wilcox	1986	1992	
6	Dennis D. Conway	1992	1998	
6	James Evenson	1998	2006	
6	John R. Storck	2006	2012	
6	Gregory Potter	2012	2018	
6	Abolished			
7	Albert L. Twesme	1978	1983	
7	James P. Fiedler	1983	1989	
7	Peter G. Pappas	1989	1995	
7	Robert W. Radcliffe	1995	2001	
7	Michael J. Rosborough	2001	2007	
7	William D. Dyke	2007	2013	
7	James J. Duvall	2013	2017	
7	Robert P. VanDeHey	2017	2023	
7	Scott L. Horne	2023		Current
8	Clarence W. Nier	1978	1982	
8	William J. Duffy	1982	1988	
8	Harold Vernon Froehlich	1988	1994	
8	Philip M. Kirk	1994	2000	
8	Joseph M. Troy	2000	2006	
8	Sue Bischel	2006	2012	
8	Donald Zuidmulder	2012	2016	
8	James A. Morrison	2016	2022	
8	Carrie A. Schneider	2022		Current
9	Ronald D. Keberle	1978	1983	
9	Daniel L. LaRocque	1983	1985	Appointed to Wisconsin Court of Appeals
9	Gary L. Carlson	1985	1992	
9	Earl W. Schmidt	1992	1998	
9	James B. Mohr	1998	2004	
9	Dorothy L. Bain	2004	2008	
9	Gregory Grau	2008	2012	
9	Neal A. Nielsen III	2012	2016	
9	Gregory Huber	2016	2022	
9	Ann Knox-Bauer	2022		Current
10	Arthur A. Cirilli	1978	1984	
10	William D. O'Brien	1984	1990	
10	Thomas J. Gallagher	1990	1996	
10	Gregory A. Peterson	1996	1999	Appointed by Tony Earl; Elected to Wisconsin Court of Appeals
10	Edward R. Brunner	1999	2005	
10	Benjamin D. Proctor	2005	2011	
10	Scott Needham	2011	2018	
10	Maureen Boyle	2018	2024	
10	John P. Anderson	2024		Current

== Judicial Districts (1978–Present) ==
=== District 1 Judges ===
Circuit	Branch	Judge	Beginning Year	End Year	Notes
Milwaukee	1	Louis J. Ceci	1978	1982	Appointed to Wisconsin Supreme Court
Milwaukee	1	Charles B. Schudson	1982	1992	Appointed by Lee S. Dreyfus; Elected to Wisconsin Court of Appeals
Milwaukee	1	Maxine Aldridge White	1992	2020	Chief Judge (2015–2020); Appointed by Tommy Thompson; Appointed to Wisconsin Court of Appeals
Milwaukee	1	Jack Dávila	2020		Appointed by Tony Evers
Milwaukee	2	George A. Burns Jr.	1978	1996	
Milwaukee	2	M. Joseph Donald	1996	2019	Appointed by Tommy Thompson; Appointed to Wisconsin Court of Appeals
Milwaukee	2	Milton L. Childs	2019		Appointed by Tony Evers
Milwaukee	3	Patricia S. Curley	1978	1996	
Milwaukee	3	Clare L. Fiorenza	1996		Appointed by Tommy Thompson
Milwaukee	4	Leah M. Lampone	1978	1994	
Milwaukee	4	Mel Flanagan	1994	2018	Appointed by Tommy Thompson
Milwaukee	4	Michael J. Hanrahan	2018		Appointed by Scott Walker
Milwaukee	5	Ralph J. Podell	1978	1979	
Milwaukee	5	Patrick T. Sheedy	1979	1998	Chief Judge (1991–1999)
Milwaukee	5	Mary K. Kuhnmuench	1998	2018	
Milwaukee	5	Paul Dedinsky	2018	2020	Appointed by Scott Walker
Milwaukee	5	Brett R. Blomme	2020	2021	Resigned
Milwaukee	5	Kristela Cervera	2021		Appointed by Tony Evers
Milwaukee	6	Robert W. Landry	1978	1993	
Milwaukee	6	George W. Greene Jr.	1993	1994	Appointed by Tommy Thompson
Milwaukee	6	Kitty K. Brennan	1994	2008	Chief Judge (2005–2008); Appointed to Wisconsin Court of Appeals
Milwaukee	6	Ellen R. Brostrom	2008	2024	Appointed by Jim Doyle
Milwaukee	6	John Remington	2024		Appointed by Tony Evers
Milwaukee	7	John F. Foley	1978	1997	
Milwaukee	7	Jean W. DiMotto	1997	2014	
Milwaukee	7	Thomas J. McAdams	2014		Appointed by Scott Walker
Milwaukee	8	Michael J. Barron	1978	2000	Chief Judge (1987–1991)
Milwaukee	8	William Sosnay	2000		Appointed by Tommy Thompson
Milwaukee	9	Robert M. Curley	1978	1983	
Milwaukee	9	Russell W. Stamper, Sr.	1983	1996	Appointed by Tony Earl
Milwaukee	9	Robert W. Crawford	1996	2002	
Milwaukee	9	Louis B. Butler Jr.	2002	2004	Appointed to Wisconsin Supreme Court
Milwaukee	9	Paul R. Van Grunsven	2004	2026	Appointed by Jim Doyle
Milwaukee	9	Malinda Eskra	2026		Appointed by Tony Evers
Milwaukee	10	Ted E. Wedemeyer Jr.	1978	1982	Elected to Wisconsin Court of Appeals
Milwaukee	10	Rudolph T. Randa	1982	1992	Appointed by Lee S. Dreyfus; Appointed to U.S. District Court, E.D. Wis.
Milwaukee	10	Timothy Dugan	1992	2016	Appointed by Tommy Thompson; Appointed to Wisconsin Court of Appeals
Milwaukee	10	Michelle Ackerman Havas	2017		Appointed by Scott Walker
Milwaukee	11	Christ T. Seraphim	1978	1980	Suspended for misconduct
Milwaukee	11	Michael T. Sullivan	1981	1984	Acting; Elected to Wisconsin Court of Appeals
Milwaukee	11	Christ T. Seraphim	1984	1986	Acting
Milwaukee	11	Frederick P. Kessler	1986	1988	
Milwaukee	11	Dominic S. Amato	1988	2013	Appointed by Tommy Thompson
Milwaukee	11	David C. Swanson	2013		
Milwaukee	12	Michael J. Skwierawski	1978	2003	Chief Judge (1999–2003)
Milwaukee	12	David L. Borowski	2003		
Milwaukee	13	Victor Manian	1978	2004	Chief Judge (1981–1987)
Milwaukee	13	Mary Triggiano	2004	2023	Chief Judge (2020–2023); Appointed by Jim Doyle
Milwaukee	13	Ana Berrios-Schroeder	2023		
Milwaukee	14	Leander J. Foley Jr.	1978	1986	
Milwaukee	14	Christopher R. Foley	1986	2023	Appointed by Tony Earl
Milwaukee	14	Amber Raffeet August	2023		Appointed by Tony Evers
Milwaukee	15	Marvin C. Holz	1978	1988	
Milwaukee	15	Ronald S. Goldberger	1988	2000	Appointed by Tommy Thompson
Milwaukee	15	Michael B. Brennan	2000	2008	Appointed by Tommy Thompson
Milwaukee	15	Jonathan D. Watts	2009		Appointed by Jim Doyle
Milwaukee	16	Fred St. Clair	1978	1979	
Milwaukee	16	William D. Gardner	1979	1997	
Milwaukee	16	Michael J. Dwyer	1997	2019	Retired
Milwaukee	16	Brittany Grayson	2019		Appointed by Tony Evers
Milwaukee	17	Hugh R. O'Connell	1978	1984	
Milwaukee	17	Francis T. Wasielewski	1984	2011	Appointed by Tony Earl
Milwaukee	17	Nelson W. Phillips III	2011	2012	Appointed by Scott Walker
Milwaukee	17	Carolina Maria Stark	2012		
Milwaukee	18	Harold B. Jackson Jr.	1978	1985	
Milwaukee	18	Patricia D. McMahon	1986	2010	Appointed by Tony Earl
Milwaukee	18	Pedro Colón	2010	2023	Appointed by Jim Doyle; Appointed to Wisconsin Court of Appeals
Milwaukee	18	Ronnie V. Murray II	2023		Appointed by Tony Evers
Milwaukee	19	John E. McCormick	1978	2005	
Milwaukee	19	Dennis R. Cimpl	2005	2020	Appointed by Jim Doyle
Milwaukee	19	Kori L . Ashley	2020		Appointed by Tony Evers
Milwaukee	20	William J. Shaughnessy	1978	1994	
Milwaukee	20	Dennis P. Moroney	1994	2018	Appointed by Tommy Thompson
Milwaukee	20	Joseph Wall	2018		
Milwaukee	21	Michael T. Sullivan	1978	1980	Chief Judge (1978–1980)
Milwaukee	21	Clarence R. Parrish	1981	1992	
Milwaukee	21	Stanley A. Miller	1992	2001	Appointed by Tommy Thompson
Milwaukee	21	William W. Brash III	2001	2015	Appointed by Scott McCallum; Appointed to Wisconsin Court of Appeals
Milwaukee	21	Cynthia M. Davis	2015		Appointed by Scott Walker
Milwaukee	22	Terence T. Evans	1978	1979	Appointed to U.S. District Court, E.D. Wis.
Milwaukee	22	William J. Haese	1979	2002	
Milwaukee	22	Timothy M. Witkowiak	2002		Appointed by Scott McCallum
Milwaukee	23	Frederick P. Kessler	1978	1981	
Milwaukee	23	Janine P. Geske	1981	1993	Appointed by Lee S. Dreyfus Appointed to Wisconsin Supreme Court
Milwaukee	23	Elsa C. Lamelas	1993	2012	Appointed by Tommy Thompson
Milwaukee	23	Lindsey Grady	2012	2023	
Milwaukee	23	Jorge Fragoso	2023		Appointed by Tony Evers
Milwaukee	24	David V. Jennings	1978	1992	
Milwaukee	24	Charles F. Kahn Jr.	1992	2014	
Milwaukee	24	Janet Protasiewicz	2014	2023	Elected to Wisconsin Supreme Court
Milwaukee	24	Raphael Ramos	2023		Appointed by Tony Evers
Milwaukee	25	Ralph G. Gorenstein	1978	1987	
Milwaukee	25	John A. Franke	1987	2010	
Milwaukee	25	Stephanie Rothstein	2010	2022	Appointed by Jim Doyle
Milwaukee	25	Nidhi Kashyap	2022		
Milwaukee	26	Michael P. Sullivan	1978	2006	Chief Judge (2003–2005)
Milwaukee	26	William S. Pocan	2006		Appointed by Jim Doyle
Milwaukee	27	Donald W. Steinmetz	1978	1980	Elected to Wisconsin Supreme Court
Milwaukee	27	Thomas P. Doherty	1980	2000	Appointed by Lee S. Dreyfus
Milwaukee	27	Kevin E. Martens	2000		Appointed by Scott McCallum
Milwaukee	28	Robert J. Miech	1978	1994	
Milwaukee	28	Thomas R. Cooper	1994	2012	Appointed by Tommy Thompson
Milwaukee	28	Mark A. Sanders	2012		
Milwaukee	29	Gary L. Gerlach	1978	1996	
Milwaukee	29	Richard J. Sankovitz	1996	2018	Appointed by Tommy Thompson
Milwaukee	29	Daniel J. Gabler	2018	2020	Appointed by Scott Walker
Milwaukee	29	Rebecca Kiefer	2020		
Milwaukee	30	William A. Jennaro	1978	1984	
Milwaukee	30	Frank T. Crivello	1984	1997	Appointed by Tony Earl
Milwaukee	30	Jeffrey A. Conen	1997	2020	
Milwaukee	30	Jonathan D. Richards	2020		Appointed by Tony Evers
Milwaukee	31	Patrick J. Madden	1978	1996	
Milwaukee	31	Daniel A. Noonan	1996	2015	
Milwaukee	31	Paul J. Rifelj	2015	2016	Appointed by Scott Walker
Milwaukee	31	Hannah C. Dugan	2016	2026	Suspended, Resigned
Milwaukee	31	Owen Piotrowski	2026		Appointed by Tony Evers
Milwaukee	32	Michael D. Guolee	1978	2014	
Milwaukee	32	Laura Gramling Perez	2014		
Milwaukee	33	Laurence C. Gram Jr.	1978	1999	
Milwaukee	33	Carl Ashley	1999		Chief Judge (2023–present)
Milwaukee	34	Ralph Adam Fine	1979	1988	Elected to Wisconsin Court of Appeals
Milwaukee	34	Ted E. Wedemeyer Jr.	1988	1992	Appointed by Tommy Thompson
Milwaukee	34	Jacqueline D. Schellinger	1992	2004	Appointed by Tommy Thompson
Milwaukee	34	Glen H. Yamahiro	2004	2026	Appointed by Jim Doyle
Milwaukee	34	Jay Pucek	2026		Appointed by Tony Evers
Milwaukee	35	Rudolph T. Randa	1979	1981	Appointed to Wisconsin Court of Appeals
Milwaukee	35	Lee E. Wells	1982	2004	Appointed by Lee S. Dreyfus
Milwaukee	35	Frederick C. Rosa	2004		Appointed by Jim Doyle
Milwaukee	36	Joseph P. Callan	1979	1992	
Milwaukee	36	Jeffrey A. Kremers	1992	2018	Chief Judge (2008–2015); Appointed by Tommy Thompson
Milwaukee	36	Laura Crivello	2018		Appointed by Scott Walker
Milwaukee	37	Arlene D. Connors	1983	1998	
Milwaukee	37	Karen E. Christenson	1998	2014	
Milwaukee	37	T. Christopher Dee	2014		Appointed by Scott Walker
Milwaukee	38	Jeffrey A. Wagner	1988	2026	
Milwaukee	38	Tanner Kilander	2026		Appointed by Tony Evers
Milwaukee	39	Michael G. Malmstadt	1988	2006	
Milwaukee	39	Jane Carroll	2006		Appointed by Jim Doyle
Milwaukee	40	Louise M. Tesmer	1989	2001	
Milwaukee	40	Joseph R. Wall	2001	2008	
Milwaukee	40	Rebecca Dallet	2008	2018	Appointed by Jim Doyle; Elected to Wisconsin Supreme Court
Milwaukee	40	Andrew A. Jones	2018	2019	Appointed by Scott Walker
Milwaukee	40	Danielle L. Shelton	2019		
Milwaukee	41	John J. Dimotto	1990	2018	
Milwaukee	41	Audrey Skwierawski	2018	2024	Appointed by Scott Walker
Milwaukee	41	Lena Taylor	2024		Appointed by Tony Evers
Milwaukee	42	David A. Hansher	1991	2020	
Milwaukee	42	Reyna Morales	2020		Appointed by Tony Evers
Milwaukee	43	Diane S. Sykes	1992	1999	Appointed to Wisconsin Supreme Court
Milwaukee	43	Marshall B. Murray	1999	2024	Appointed by Tommy Thompson
Milwaukee	43	Marisabel Cabrera	2024		
Milwaukee	44	Daniel L. Konkol	1992	2016	
Milwaukee	44	Gwen Connolly	2016		
Milwaukee	45	Thomas P. Donegan	1992	2012	
Milwaukee	45	Rebecca Bradley	2012	2015	Appointed by Scott Walker; Appointed to Wisconsin Court of Appeals
Milwaukee	45	Michelle Ackerman Havas	2015	2016	Appointed by Scott Walker
Milwaukee	45	Jean Marie Kies	2016		
Milwaukee	46	Bonnie L. Gordon	1994	2014	
Milwaukee	46	David Feiss	2015	2023	Appointed by Scott Walker
Milwaukee	46	Anderson Gansner	2023		Appointed by Tony Evers
Milwaukee	47	John Siefert	1999	2017	
Milwaukee	47	Kristy Yang	2017		

=== District 2 Judges ===
Circuit	Branch	Judge	Beginning Year	End Year	Notes
Kenosha	1	Earl D. Morton	1978	1984	
Kenosha	1	David M. Bastianelli	1984	2020	Appointed by Tony Earl
Kenosha	1	Larisa V. Benitez-Morgan	2020	2021	Appointed by Tony Evers
Kenosha	1	Gerad Dougvillo	2021		
Kenosha	2	William U. Zievers	1978	1988	
Kenosha	2	Paul F. Wokwicz	1988	1989	Appointed by Tommy Thompson
Kenosha	2	Barbara A. Kluka	1989	2011	Chief Judge (1996–2002)
Kenosha	2	Jason A. Rossell	2011		Chief Judge (2017–2024); Appointed by Scott Walker
Kenosha	3	John E. Malloy	1978	1983	Died in office
Kenosha	3	Bruce Schroeder	1983	2023	Appointed by Tony Earl
Kenosha	3	Frank Gagliardi	2023	2024	Appointed by Tony Evers
Kenosha	3	Heather Iverson	2024		
Kenosha	4	Michael S. Fisher	1978	2005	Chief Judge (1984–1990)
Kenosha	4	Anthony Milisauskas	2005	2026	
Kenosha	4	David Hughes	2026		Appointed by Tony Evers
Kenosha	5	Burton A. Scott	1978	1980	Elected to Wisconsin Court of Appeals
Kenosha	5	Robert V. Baker	1980	1996	Appointed by Lee S. Dreyfus
Kenosha	5	Wilbur W. Warren III	1996	2014	Appointed by Tommy Thompson
Kenosha	5	David P. Wilk	2014		Appointed by Scott Walker
Kenosha	6	Jerold W. Breitenbach	1985	1991	
Kenosha	6	Mary K. Wagner	1991	2021	Chief Judge (2008–2014)
Kenosha	6	Angelina Gabriele	2021		
Kenosha	7	S. Michael Wilk	1994	2016	
Kenosha	7	Jodi L. Meier	2016		Appointed by Scott Walker
Kenosha	8	Chad G. Kerkman	2009		
Racine	1	John C. Ahlgrimm	1978	1988	Chief Judge (1978–1984)
Racine	1	Gerald P. Ptacek	1988	2016	Chief Judge (2002–2008); Appointed by Tommy Thompson
Racine	1	Wynne Laufenberg	2016		Chief Judge (2024–present); Appointed by Scott Walker
Racine	2	Thomas P. Corbett	1978	1979	
Racine	2	Stephen A. Simanek	1979	2010	Chief Judge (1990–1996); Appointed by Lee S. Dreyfus
Racine	2	Eugene Gasiorkiewicz	2010		
Racine	3	Jon B. Skow	1978	1992	
Racine	3	Emily S. Mueller	1992	2018	Appointed by Tommy Thompson
Racine	3	Maureen M. Martinez	2018	2023	Appointed by Scott Walker
Racine	3	Toni L. Young	2023	2024	Appointed by Tony Evers
Racine	3	Jessica Lynott	2024		
Racine	4	William F. Jones	1978	1979	
Racine	4	Emmanuel J. Vuvunas	1979	2004	
Racine	4	John S. Jude	2004	2016	Appointed by Jim Doyle
Racine	4	Mark Nielsen	2016	2023	
Racine	4	Scott Craig	2024		Appointed by Tony Evers
Racine	5	Richard G. Harvey Jr.	1978	1981	
Racine	5	Dennis J. Barry	1981	2011	Appointed by Lee S. Dreyfus; Died in office
Racine	5	Michael E. Nieskes	2011	2012	Appointed by Scott Walker
Racine	5	Michael Piontek	2012	2020	
Racine	5	Kristin M. Cafferty	2021		Appointed by Tony Evers
Racine	6	Dennis D. Costello	1978	1985	
Racine	6	Wayne J. Marik	1985	2015	
Racine	6	David W. Paulson	2015		
Racine	7	James Wilbershide	1978	1990	
Racine	7	Nancy Wheeler	1990	1996	Appointed by Tommy Thompson
Racine	7	Charles H. Constantine	1996	2018	
Racine	7	Jon E. Fredrickson	2018	2025	Appointed by Scott Walker
Racine	7	Jamie M. McClendon	2025		
Racine	8	Dennis J. Flynn	1978	2002	
Racine	8	Faye M. Flancher	2002		Appointed by Scott McCallum
Racine	9	Allan B. Torhorst	1991	2017	Chief Judge (2014–2017)
Racine	9	Robert S. Repischak	2017		Appointed by Scott Walker
Racine	10	Richard J. Kreul	1994	2012	
Racine	10	Timothy D. Boyle	2012		
Walworth	1	Erwin C. Zastrow	1978	1982	Disabled
Walworth	1	Robert H. Gollmar	1978	1982	Acting
Walworth	1	Robert Reed	1982	1988	
Walworth	1	Robert J. Kennedy	1988	2012	
Walworth	1	Phillip A. Koss	2012	2024	
Walworth	1	Estee E. Scholtz	2024		
Walworth	2	James L. Carlson	1978	2016	Appointed by Lee S. Dreyfus
Walworth	2	Daniel S. Johnson	2016		
Walworth	3	John J. Byrnes	1978	1984	
Walworth	3	John R. Race	1984	2014	Appointed by Tony Earl
Walworth	3	Kristine E. Drettwan	2014		Appointed by Scott Walker
Walworth	4	Michael S. Gibbs	1992	2010	
Walworth	4	David M. Reddy	2010	2026	
Walworth	4	Samuel Berg	2026	2027	Appointed by Tony Evers

=== District 3 Judges ===
Circuit	Branch	Judge	Beginning Year	End Year	Notes
Dodge	1	Brian A. Pfitzinger	2008		Appointed by Jim Doyle; District 6 before Aug. 1, 2018
Dodge	2	Martin J. De Vries	2016		Appointed by Scott Walker; District 6 before Aug. 1, 2018
Dodge	3	Joseph G. Sciascia	2013	2025	District 6 before Aug. 1, 2018
Dodge	3	Chad Wozniak	2025		
Dodge	4	Steven Bauer	2008	2020	District 6 before Aug. 1, 2018
Dodge	4	Kristine A. Snow	2020		
Jefferson	1	John B. Danforth	1978	1991	
Jefferson	1	John M. Ullsvik	1991	2009	
Jefferson	1	Jennifer L. Weston	2009	2018	
Jefferson	1	William V. Gruber	2018		Appointed by Scott Walker
Jefferson	2	William Brandel	1978	1983	
Jefferson	2	Arnold K. Schumann	1983	1995	Appointed by Lee S. Dreyfus
Jefferson	2	William F. Hue	1995	2024	
Jefferson	2	Theresa A. Beck	2024		Appointed by Tony Evers
Jefferson	3	Harold H. Eberhardt	1979	1991	
Jefferson	3	Jacqueline Rohloff Erwin	1991	2013	Appointed by Tommy Thompson
Jefferson	3	David J. Wambach	2013	2017	Appointed by Scott Walker
Jefferson	3	Robert F. Dehring Jr.	2017		Appointed by Scott Walker
Jefferson	4	Randy R. Koschnick	1999	2017	Chief Judge (2013–2017)
Jefferson	4	Bennett J. Brantmeier	2017		
Ozaukee	1	Walter J. Swietlik	1978	2002	
Ozaukee	1	Paul V. Malloy	2002	2024	Appointed by Scott McCallum
Ozaukee	1	Adam Gerol	2024		Appointed by Tony Evers
Ozaukee	2	Warren A. Grady	1978	1994	
Ozaukee	2	Tom R. Wolfgram	1994	2013	Appointed by Tommy Thompson
Ozaukee	2	Joe Voiland	2013	2019	
Ozaukee	2	Steve Cain	2019		
Ozaukee	3	Joseph D. McCormack	1979	2009	
Ozaukee	3	Sandy A. Williams	2009		Appointed by Jim Doyle
Washington	1	J. Tom Merriam	1978	1990	
Washington	1	Lawrence F. Waddick	1990	2000	
Washington	1	Patrick J. Faragher	2000	2010	Appointed by Tommy Thompson
Washington	1	James Pouros	2010	2022	Appointed by Jim Doyle
Washington	1	Ryan Hetzel	2022		Appointed by Tony Evers
Washington	2	James B. Schwalbach	1978	1997	Chief Judge (1991–1995)
Washington	2	Annette Ziegler	1997	2007	Appointed by Tommy Thompson; Elected to Wisconsin Supreme Court
Washington	2	James K. Muehlbauer	2007	2025	Appointed by Jim Doyle
Washington	2	Gordon R. Leech	2025		Appointed by Tony Evers
Washington	3	Richard T. Becker	1978	2000	
Washington	3	David C. Resheske	2000	2010	Appointed by Tommy Thompson
Washington	3	Todd K. Martens	2010	2022	Appointed by Jim Doyle
Washington	3	Michael Kenitz	2022		Appointed by Tony Evers
Washington	4	Leo F. Schlaefer	1988	2000	
Washington	4	Andrew T. Gonring	2000	2020	
Washington	4	Sandra J. Giernoth	2020		Appointed by Tony Evers
Waukesha	1	William E. Gramling	1978	1980	Disabled
Waukesha	1	Max Raskin	1978	1980	Acting
Waukesha	1	Harry G. Snyder	1980	1991	Appointed by Lee S. Dreyfus; Appointed to Wisconsin Court of Appeals
Waukesha	1	Joseph Wimmer	1991	2000	Appointed by Tommy Thompson
Waukesha	1	Michael O. Bohren	2000	2025	Appointed by Tommy Thompson
Waukesha	1	Scott Wagner	2025		
Waukesha	2	Ness Flores	1978	1984	
Waukesha	2	Mark S. Gempeler	1984	2009	Chief Judge (1995–2001); Appointed by Tony Earl
Waukesha	2	Richard Congdon	2009	2010	Appointed by Jim Doyle
Waukesha	2	Mark Gundrum	2010	2011	
Waukesha	2	Jennifer R. Dorow	2011		Chief Judge (2017–2023); Appointed by Scott Walker
Waukesha	3	David L. Dancey	1978	1980	
Waukesha	3	Roger P. Murphy	1980	1999	Appointed by Lee S. Dreyfus
Waukesha	3	Ralph M. Ramirez	1999		
Waukesha	4	Patrick L. Snyder	1978	2003	Chief Judge (1985–1991)
Waukesha	4	Paul F. Reilly	2003	2010	
Waukesha	4	Kathleen Stilling	2010	2011	Appointed by Jim Doyle
Waukesha	4	Lloyd V. Carter	2011	2024	
Waukesha	4	Bridget Schoenborn	2024	2025	Appointed by Tony Evers
Waukesha	4	David Maas	2025		
Waukesha	5	Harold J. Wollenzien	1978	1990	Chief Judge (1978–1995)
Waukesha	5	Lee S. Dreyfus Jr.	1990	2020	
Waukesha	5	J. Arthur Melvin III	2020		
Waukesha	6	Robert T. McGraw	1978	1990	
Waukesha	6	J. Mac Davis	1990	1996	
Waukesha	6	Patrick C. Haughney	1996	2018	Appointed by Tommy Thompson
Waukesha	6	Brad Schimel	2018	2025	Appointed by Scott Walker
Waukesha	6	Zach Wittchow	2025		
Waukesha	7	Neal P. Nettesheim	1978	1984	Elected to Wisconsin Court of Appeals
Waukesha	7	Jess Martinez Jr.	1984	1985	Appointed by Tony Earl
Waukesha	7	Clair H. Voss	1985	1997	
Waukesha	7	J. Mac Davis	1997	2015	Chief Judge (2007–2013)
Waukesha	7	Maria S. Lazar	2015	2022	Elected to Wisconsin Court of Appeals
Waukesha	7	Fred Strampe	2022	2023	Appointed by Tony Evers
Waukesha	7	Cody Horlacher	2023		
Waukesha	8	John P. Buckley	1979	1985	
Waukesha	8	James R. Kieffer	1985	2015	
Waukesha	8	Michael P. Maxwell	2015		
Waukesha	9	Willis J. Zick	1979	1994	
Waukesha	9	Donald J. Hassin Jr.	1994	2014	Appointed by Tommy Thompson
Waukesha	9	Michael Aprahamian	2014		Appointed by Scott Walker
Waukesha	10	Marianne Becker	1985	2003	
Waukesha	10	Linda Van De Water	2003	2015	Appointed by Jim Doyle
Waukesha	10	Paul Bugenhagen Jr.	2015		Chief Judge (2023–present)
Waukesha	11	Robert G. Mawdsley	1988	2010	
Waukesha	11	William Domina	2010		Appointed by Jim Doyle
Waukesha	12	Kathryn W. Foster	1988	2018	Chief Judge (2001–2007)
Waukesha	12	Laura Lau	2018	2024	
Waukesha	12	Jack A. Pitzo	2024		

=== District 4 Judges ===
Circuit	Branch	Judge	Beginning Year	End Year	Notes
Calumet	1	David H. Sebora	1978	1979	
Calumet	1	Hugh F. Nelson	1979	1992	Chief Judge (1990–1992)
Calumet	1	Donald A. Poppy	1992	2012	
Calumet	1	Jeffrey S. Froehlich	2012		Appointed by Scott Walker
Calumet	2	Carey John Reed	2021		
Fond du Lac	1	Jerold E. Murphy	1978	1983	
Fond du Lac	1	John W. Mickiewicz	1983	1996	Appointed by Lee S. Dreyfus
Fond du Lac	1	Dale L. English	1996	2022	
Fond du Lac	1	Anthony Nehls	2022		Appointed by Tony Evers
Fond du Lac	2	John P. McGalloway, Jr.	1978	1992	
Fond du Lac	2	Peter L. Grimm	1992	2022	Appointed by Tommy Thompson
Fond du Lac	2	Laura Lavey	2022		
Fond du Lac	3	Hazen W. McEssy	1978	1981	
Fond du Lac	3	Henry B. Buslee	1981	2003	Appointed by Lee S. Dreyfus
Fond du Lac	3	Richard J. Nuss	2003	2021	Appointed by Scott McCallum
Fond du Lac	3	Andrew J. Christenson	2021		
Fond du Lac	4	Eugene F. McEssey	1978	1986	
Fond du Lac	4	Steven W. Weinke	1986	2010	
Fond du Lac	4	Gary R. Sharpe	2010	2020	
Fond du Lac	4	Tricia L. Walker	2021		Appointed by Tony Evers
Fond du Lac	5	Robert J. Wirtz	1999	2021	Chief Judge (2011–2017)
Fond du Lac	5	Paul G. Czisny	2021	2022	Appointed by Tony Evers
Fond du Lac	5	Douglas R. Edelstein	2022		
Green Lake	X	Mark Slate	2011		District 6 before Aug. 1, 2018
Manitowoc	1	Allan J. Deehr	1978	1997	
Manitowoc	1	Patrick L. Willis	1997	2012	Appointed by Tommy Thompson
Manitowoc	1	Mark R. Rohrer	2013		Appointed by Scott Walker
Manitowoc	2	Leon H. Jones	1978	1989	
Manitowoc	2	Darryl W. Deets	1989	2011	Chief Judge (2007–2011); Appointed by Tommy Thompson
Manitowoc	2	Gary Bendix	2011	2018	Appointed by Scott Walker
Manitowoc	2	Jerilyn M. Dietz	2018		
Manitowoc	3	Harold W. Mueller	1978	1981	
Manitowoc	3	Fred H. Hazlewood	1981	2005	Appointed by Lee S. Dreyfus
Manitowoc	3	Jerome L. Fox	2005	2017	
Manitowoc	3	Bob Dewane	2017		
Manitowoc	4	Anthony A. Lambrecht	2023		
Marquette	X	Bernard Ben Bult	2013	2019	District 6 before Aug. 1, 2018
Marquette	X	Chad A. Hendee	2019		
Sheboygan	1	Daniel P. Anderson	1978	1979	Appointed by Martin J. Schreiber
Sheboygan	1	Ernest C. Keppler	1979	1985	
Sheboygan	1	L. Edward Stengel	1985		Chief Judge (2001–2007)
Sheboygan	2	John G. Buchen	1978	1989	
Sheboygan	2	Timothy M. Van Akkeren	1989	2016	
Sheboygan	2	Kent Hoffmann	2016	2023	Appointed by Scott Walker
Sheboygan	2	Natasha L. Torry	2023		
Sheboygan	3	John Bolgert	1978	1987	
Sheboygan	3	Gary J. Langhoff	1987	2010	
Sheboygan	3	Angela Sutkiewicz	2010		Appointed by Jim Doyle
Sheboygan	4	Daniel P. Anderson	1979	1990	Elected to Wisconsin Court of Appeals
Sheboygan	4	John B. Murphy	1990	2003	Appointed by Tommy Thompson
Sheboygan	4	Terence T. Bourke	2003	2015	
Sheboygan	4	Rebecca Persick	2015		
Sheboygan	5	James J. Bolgert	1994	2016	
Sheboygan	5	Daniel J. Borowski	2016	2023	Appointed by Scott Walker
Sheboygan	5	George Limbeck	2023		
Waushara	1	Guy D. Dutcher	2005		Chief Judge (2022–present); District 6 before Aug. 1, 2018
Waushara	2	Scott C. Blader	2022		
Winnebago	1	William E. Crane	1978	2000	Chief Judge (1984–1990)
Winnebago	1	Thomas J. Gritton	2000	2018	
Winnebago	1	Teresa S. Basiliere	2018	2024	
Winnebago	1	Michael D. Rust	2024		
Winnebago	2	Edmund P. Arpin	1978	1982	
Winnebago	2	Robert A. Haase	1982	2004	Chief Judge (1995–2001)
Winnebago	2	Scott C. Woldt	2004		Appointed by Jim Doyle
Winnebago	3	Thomas S. Williams	1978	1998	Chief Judge (1992–1995)
Winnebago	3	Barbara Hart Key	1998	2022	Chief Judge (2017–2022)
Winnebago	3	Bryan D. Keberlein	2022		
Winnebago	4	James G. Sarres	1978	1982	
Winnebago	4	Robert A. Hawley	1982	2006	Appointed by Jim Doyle
Winnebago	4	Karen L. Seifert	2006	2021	
Winnebago	4	LaKeisha D. Haase	2021	2022	Appointed by Tony Evers
Winnebago	4	Mike Gibbs	2022		
Winnebago	5	William H. Carver	1978	2010	
Winnebago	5	John A. Jorgensen	2010		
Winnebago	6	Bruce K. Schmidt	1991	2010	
Winnebago	6	Robert A. Hawley	2010	2011	Appointed by Jim Doyle
Winnebago	6	Daniel J. Bissett	2011		

=== District 5 Judges ===
Circuit	Branch	Judge	Beginning Year	End Year	Notes
Columbia	1	Todd J. Hepler	2015		District 6 before Aug. 1, 2018
Columbia	2	W. Andrew Voigt	2011		District 6 before Aug. 1, 2018
Columbia	3	Troy D. Cross	2018	2024	Appointed by Scott Walker
Columbia	3	Roger L. Klopp	2024		
Dane	1	Richard W. Bardwell	1978	1987	Chief Judge (1978–1982)
Dane	1	Robert A. DeChambeau	1987	2008	
Dane	1	John Markson	2008	2017	Appointed by Jim Doyle
Dane	1	Timothy Samuelson	2017	2018	Appointed by Scott Walker
Dane	1	Susan M. Crawford	2018	2025	Elected to Wisconsin Supreme Court
Dane	1	Benjamin Jones	2025		Appointed by Tony Evers
Dane	2	Michael B. Torphy Jr.	1978	1998	
Dane	2	Maryann Sumi	1998	2014	Appointed by Tommy Thompson
Dane	2	Josann M. Reynolds	2014	2024	Appointed by Scott Walker
Dane	2	Payal Khandhar	2024		Appointed by Tony Evers
Dane	3	P. Charles Jones	1978	2000	
Dane	3	John C. Albert	2000	2014	Appointed by Tommy Thompson
Dane	3	Jim Troupis	2015	2016	Appointed by Scott Walker
Dane	3	Valerie L. Bailey-Rihn	2016	2022	
Dane	3	Diane Schlipper	2022		
Dane	4	William F. Eich	1978	1984	
Dane	4	Paulette L. Siebers	1984	1986	
Dane	4	John Aulik	1986	1998	
Dane	4	Steven D. Ebert	1998	2010	Appointed by Tommy Thompson
Dane	4	Amy Smith	2010	2016	Appointed by Jim Doyle
Dane	4	Everett Mitchell	2016		
Dane	5	Robert R. Pekowsky	1978	2000	Chief Judge (1988–1994)
Dane	5	Diane M. Nicks	2000	2009	Appointed by Tommy Thompson
Dane	5	Nicholas J. McNamara	2009		Appointed by Jim Doyle
Dane	6	James C. Boll	1978	1990	Appointed by Lee S. Dreyfuss
Dane	6	Richard J. Callaway	1990	2003	Appointed by Tommy Thompson
Dane	6	Shelley J. Gaylord	2003	2020	
Dane	6	Nia Trammell	2020		Appointed by Tony Evers
Dane	7	Moria G. Krueger	1978	2008	
Dane	7	William E. Hanrahan	2008	2020	Chief Judge (2019–2020); Appointed by Jim Doyle
Dane	7	Mario D. White	2020		Appointed by Tony Evers
Dane	8	Ervin M. Bruner	1978	1982	
Dane	8	Edward S. Marion	1982	1984	Appointed by Tony Earl
Dane	8	Susan R. Steingass	1984	1993	Appointed by Tony Earl
Dane	8	Patrick J. Fiedler	1993	2011	Appointed by Tommy Thompson
Dane	8	Frank D. Remington	2012	2025	Appointed by Scott Walker
Dane	8	Stephanie Hilton	2025		Appointed by Tony Evers
Dane	9	William D. Byrne	1978	1988	
Dane	9	Gerald C. Nichol	1988	2004	Appointed by Tommy Thompson
Dane	9	Richard Niess	2004	2020	Appointed by Jim Doyle
Dane	9	Jacob B. Frost	2020		Appointed by Tony Evers
Dane	10	Angela B. Bartell	1978	2008	Chief Judge (1982–1988)
Dane	10	Juan B. Colas	2008	2022	Appointed by Jim Doyle
Dane	10	Ryan D. Nilsestuen	2022		Appointed by Tony Evers
Dane	11	Daniel R. Moeser	1980	2011	Chief Judge (1994–2001)
Dane	11	Roger A. Allen	2012	2012	Appointed by Scott Walker
Dane	11	Ellen K. Berz	2012		Appointed by Scott Walker to start term early
Dane	12	Mark A. Frankel	1980	2000	
Dane	12	David T. Flanagan	2000	2016	Appointed by Tommy Thompson
Dane	12	Clayton Kawski	2016	2017	Appointed by Scott Walker
Dane	12	Jill J. Karofsky	2017	2020	Elected to Wisconsin Supreme Court
Dane	12	Chris Taylor	2020	2023	Appointed by Tony Evers; Elected to Wisconsin Court of Appeals; Elected to Wisconsin Supreme Court
Dane	12	Ann Peacock	2023		Appointed by Tony Evers
Dane	13	Michael W. Nowakowski	1985	2009	Chief Judge (2001–2007)
Dane	13	Julie Genovese	2009		Chief Judge (2024–present)
Dane	14	George Northrup	1985	1998	
Dane	14	C. William Foust	1998	2016	Chief Judge (2007–2013); Appointed by Tommy Thompson
Dane	14	John D. Hyland	2016		
Dane	15	Stuart A. Schwartz	1992	2010	
Dane	15	Stephen Ehlke	2010		Appointed by Jim Doyle
Dane	16	Sarah B. O'Brien	1992	2012	
Dane	16	Rebecca Rapp St. John	2012	2013	Appointed by Scott Walker
Dane	16	Rhonda L. Lanford	2013		
Dane	17	Paul Higginbotham	1994	2003	Appointed to Wisconsin Court of Appeals
Dane	17	James L. Martin	2003	2010	Appointed by Jim Doyle
Dane	17	Peter C. Anderson	2010	2020	Appointed by Jim Doyle
Dane	17	David D. Conway	2020		Appointed by Tony Evers
Green	1	Franz W. Brand	1978	1988	
Green	1	John Callaghan	1988	1994	
Green	1	David G. Deininger	1994	1996	Appointed to Wisconsin Court of Appeals
Green	1	James R. Beer	1996		Appointed by Tommy Thompson
Green	2	Thomas J. Vale	2009	2024	Chief Judge (2020–2024)
Green	2	Jane Bucher	2024		Appointed by Tony Evers
Lafayette	X	Daniel P. McDonald	1978	1985	
Lafayette	X	William D. Johnston	1985	2015	
Lafayette	X	Duane M. Jorgenson	2015	2024	Died in office
Lafayette	X	Jenna Gill	2024		Appointed by Tony Evers
Rock	1	Mark J. Farnum	1978	1989	
Rock	1	James P. Daley	1989	2018	Chief Judge (2013–2019); Appointed by Tommy Thompson
Rock	1	Karl R. Hanson	2018		Appointed by Scott Walker
Rock	2	Sverre Roang	1978	1979	
Rock	2	John H. Lussow	1979	2004	
Rock	2	R. Alan Bates	2004	2018	
Rock	2	Derrick A. Grubb	2018		Appointed by Scott Walker
Rock	3	Gerald W. Jaeckle	1978	1991	
Rock	3	Michael J. Byron	1991	2008	Appointed by Tommy Thompson
Rock	3	Michael R. Fitzpatrick	2008	2017	Appointed by Jim Doyle; Elected to Wisconsin Court of Appeals
Rock	3	Jeffrey S. Kuglitsch	2017		Appointed by Scott Walker
Rock	4	Edwin C. Dahlberg	1978	2000	
Rock	4	Daniel T. Dillon	2000	2022	Appointed by Tommy Thompson
Rock	4	Ashely Morse	2022		Appointed by Tony Evers
Rock	5	John H. Lussow	1978	1979	Appointed by Lee S. Dreyfus
Rock	5	J. Richard Long	1979	1996	
Rock	5	John W. Roethe	1996	2008	Appointed by Tommy Thompson
Rock	5	Kenneth Forbeck	2008	2015	Appointed by Jim Doyle
Rock	5	Mike Haakenson	2015		
Rock	6	Patrick J. Rude	1979	1996	
Rock	6	Richard T. Werner	1996	2016	Appointed by Tommy Thompson
Rock	6	John M. Wood	2016		Appointed by Scott Walker
Rock	7	James E. Welker	1988	2012	
Rock	7	Barbara W. McCrory	2012		
Sauk	1	Michael P. Screnock	2015		Appointed by Scott Walker; District 6 before Aug. 1, 2018
Sauk	2	Wendy J. N. Klicko	2016		District 6 before Aug. 1, 2018
Sauk	3	Patricia A. Barrett	2018	2024	
Sauk	3	Blake J. Duren	2024		

=== District 6 Judges (abolished 2018) ===
Circuit	Branch	Judge	Beginning Year	End Year	Notes
Adams	X	Raymond E. Gieringer	1978	1991	
Adams	X	Duane H. Polivka	1991	2003	
Adams	X	Charles A. Pollex	2003	2015	
Adams	X	Daniel Glen Wood	2015		Transitioned to District 7
Clark	1	Lowell D. Schoengarth	1978	1986	Branch abolished
Clark	2	Michael W. Brennan	1978	2000	
Clark	X	Jon M. Counsell	2000	2018	Appointed by Tommy Thompson
Columbia	1	Howard W. Latton	1978	1984	
Columbia	1	Earl J. McMahon	1984	1991	Appointed by Tony Earl
Columbia	1	Daniel S. George	1991	2015	
Columbia	1	Todd J. Hepler	2015		Transitioned to District 5
Columbia	2	Lewis W. Charles	1978	2000	
Columbia	2	James O. Miller	2000	2011	
Columbia	2	W. Andrew Voigt	2011		Transitioned to District 5
Columbia	3	Daniel C. O'Connor	1978	1979	Branch abolished
Columbia	3	Richard L. Rehm	1991	2006	Branch re-established
Columbia	3	Alan White	2006	2018	Appointed by Jim Doyle
Dodge	1	Henry G. Gergen, Jr.	1978	1984	
Dodge	1	Daniel Klossner	1984	2008	
Dodge	1	Brian A. Pfitzinger	2008		Appointed by Jim Doyle; Transitioned to District 3
Dodge	2	Joseph E. Schultz	1978	1995	
Dodge	2	John R. Storck	1995	2016	Chief Judge (2006–2012); Appointed by Tommy Thompson
Dodge	2	Martin J. De Vries	2016		Appointed by Scott Walker; Transitioned to District 3
Dodge	3	Thomas W. Wells	1978	1989	
Dodge	3	Andrew P. Bissonnette	1989	2013	Appointed by Tommy Thompson
Dodge	3	Joseph G. Sciascia	2013		Transitioned to District 3
Dodge	4	Steven Bauer	2008		Transitioned to District 3
Green Lake	X	David C. Willis	1978	1992	Acting Chief Judge (1985–1986)
Green Lake	X	William M. McMonigal	1992	2011	Appointed by Tommy Thompson
Green Lake	X	Mark Slate	2011		Transitioned to District 4
Juneau	X	William R. Curran	1978	1979	
Juneau	X	Wallace A. Brady	1979	1992	
Juneau	X	John W. Brady	1992	2003	Died in office
Juneau	X	Dennis Schuh	2003	2004	Appointed by Jim Doyle
Juneau	1	John Pier Roemer	2004	2017	
Juneau	2	Paul S. Curran	2008		Transitioned to District 7
Marquette	X	Andrew P. Cotter	1978	1982	
Marquette	X	Donn H. Dahlke	1982	1995	Appointed by Lee S. Dreyfus
Marquette	X	Richard O. Wright	1995	2013	
Marquette	X	Bernard Ben Bult	2013	2019	Transitioned to District 4
Portage	1	James H. Levi	1978	1981	
Portage	1	Frederic W. Fleishauer	1981	2011	Appointed by Lee S. Dreyfus
Portage	1	Thomas B. Eagon	2012		Appointed by Scott Walker; Transitioned to District 9
Portage	2	Robert C. Jenkins	1978	1988	
Portage	2	John V. Finn	1988	2015	Appointed by Tommy Thompson
Portage	2	Robert J. Shannon	2015		Appointed by Scott Walker; Transitioned to District 9
Portage	3	Thomas T. Flugaur	1994		Transitioned to District 9
Sauk	1	James W. Karch	1978	1982	
Sauk	1	Robert Curtin	1982	1994	
Sauk	1	Patrick J. Taggart	1994	2015	Appointed by Tommy Thompson
Sauk	1	Michael P. Screnock	2015		Appointed by Scott Walker; Transitioned to District 5
Sauk	2	James R. Seering	1978	1986	
Sauk	2	James Evenson	1986	2016	Chief Judge (1998–2006)
Sauk	2	Wendy J. N. Klicko	2016		Transitioned to District 5
Sauk	3	Virginia Wolfe	1988	2000	
Sauk	3	Guy D. Reynolds	2000	2018	
Waushara	X	Jon P. Wilcox	1979	1992	Chief Judge (1986–1992); Appointed to Wisconsin Supreme Court
Waushara	X	Lewis R. Murach	1993	2005	Appointed by Tommy Thompson
Waushara	X	Guy Dutcher	2005		Transitioned to District 4
Wood	1	Dennis D. Conway	1978	2001	Chief Judge (1992–1998); Appointed by Martin J. Schreiber
Wood	1	Gregory J. Potter	2001		Chief Judge (2012–2018); Appointed by Scott McCallum; Transitioned to District 9
Wood	2	Frederick A. Fink	1978	1985	Chief Judge (1984–1985); Died in office
Wood	2	Thomas N. Hayden	1985	1986	Appointed by Tony Earl
Wood	2	James M. Mason	1986	2011	
Wood	2	Nicholas J. Brazeau Jr.	2011		Appointed by Scott Walker; Transitioned to District 9
Wood	3	Edward F. Zappen, Jr.	1985	2009	
Wood	3	Todd P. Wolf	2009		Transitioned to District 9

=== District 7 Judges ===
Circuit	Branch	Judge	Beginning Year	End Year	Notes
Adams	1	Daniel Glen Wood	2015		District 6 before Aug. 1, 2018
Adams	2	Tania M. Bonnett	2022		
Buffalo–Pepin	X	Gary B. Schlosstein	1978	1990	
Buffalo–Pepin	X	Dane Morey	1990	2005	Appointed by Tommy Thompson
Buffalo–Pepin	X	James J. Duvall	2005	2018	Chief Judge (2013–2017); Appointed by Jim Doyle
Buffalo–Pepin	X	Thomas W. Clark	2018		
Clark	1	Lyndsey Boon Brunette	2018		
Clark	2	William Bratcher	2023		
Crawford	X	Michael T. Kirchman	1978	2010	
Crawford	X	James P. Czajkowski	2010	2016	Appointed by Jim Doyle
Crawford	X	Lynn Marie Ryder	2016		
Grant	1	John R. Wagner	1978	1999	
Grant	1	Robert P. VanDeHey	1999	2023	Chief Judge (2017–2023); Appointed by Tommy Thompson
Grant	1	Lisa A. Riniker	2023		
Grant	2	William L. Reinecke	1978	1991	
Grant	2	George S. Curry	1991	2009	Appointed by Tommy Thompson
Grant	2	Craig R. Day	2009		
Iowa	X	James P. Fiedler	1978	1996	Chief Judge (1983–1989)
Iowa	X	William D. Dyke	1997	2016	Chief Judge (2007–2013); Appointed by Tommy Thompson
Iowa	X	Margaret M. Koehler	2016	2022	Appointed by Scott Walker
Iowa	X	Matt Allen	2022		
Jackson	X	Louis S. Dricktrah	1978	1986	
Jackson	X	Robert W. Radcliffe	1986	2002	Chief Judge (1995–2001)
Jackson	X	Gerald Laabs	2002	2008	
Jackson	X	Eric F. Stutz	2008	2008	
Jackson	X	Thomas Lister	2008	2014	Appointed by Jim Doyle
Jackson	X	Anna L. Becker	2014		Appointed by Scott Walker
Juneau	1	Stacy A. Smith	2018		Appointed by Scott Walker
Juneau	2	Paul S. Curran	2008		District 6 before Aug. 1, 2018
La Crosse	1	Peter G. Pappas	1978	1995	Chief Judge (1989–1995)
La Crosse	1	Ramona A. Gonzalez	1995	2025	
La Crosse	1	Joe Veenstra	2025		
La Crosse	2	Eugene A. Toepel	1978	1983	
La Crosse	2	Michael J. Mulroy	1983	2007	
La Crosse	2	Elliott Levine	2007		
La Crosse	3	Dennis G. Montabon	1978	2006	
La Crosse	3	Roger LeGrand	2006	2007	Appointed by Jim Doyle
La Crosse	3	Todd Bjerke	2007	2023	
La Crosse	3	Mark A. Huesmann	2023		Appointed by Tony Evers
La Crosse	4	John J. Perlich	1985	2006	
La Crosse	4	Scott L. Horne	2007		Appointed by Jim Doyle; Chief Judge (2023–present)
La Crosse	5	Dale T. Pasell	1999	2014	
La Crosse	5	Candice Tlustosch	2015	2015	Appointed by Scott Walker
La Crosse	5	Gloria L. Doyle	2015		
Monroe	1	James W. Rice	1978		
Monroe	1	Steven L. Abbott	1995	2007	Appointed by Tommy Thompson
Monroe	1	Todd L. Ziegler	2007	2024	Appointed to Court of Appeals
Monroe	2	Michael J. McAlpine	1992	2010	
Monroe	2	Mark L. Goodman	2010		
Monroe	3	J. David Rice	2010	2017	
Monroe	3	Rick Radcliffe	2017		Appointed by Scott Walker
Pierce	X	William E. McEwen	1978	1980	
Pierce	X	Robert W. Wing	1980	2010	Appointed by Tony Earl
Pierce	X	Joseph D. Boles	2010	2020	Appointed by Jim Doyle
Pierce	X	Elizabeth Rohl	2021		Appointed by Tony Evers
Richland	X	Kent C. Houck	1978	1997	
Richland	X	Edward E. Leineweber	1997	2011	
Richland	X	W. Andrew Sharp	2011	2022	Appointed by Scott Walker
Richland	X	Lisa McDougal	2022		Appointed by Tony Evers
Trempealeau	X	Albert L. Twesme	1978	1983	Chief Judge (1978–1983)
Trempealeau	X	Richard Galstad	1983	1994	Appointed by Tony Earl
Trempealeau	X	Alan S. Robertson	1994	1995	Appointed by Tommy Thompson
Trempealeau	X	John A. Damon	1995	2016	
Trempealeau	X	Charles Feltes	2016	2017	Appointed by Scott Walker
Trempealeau	X	Rian W. Radtke	2017		
Vernon	X	Walter S. Block	1978	1986	
Vernon	X	Michael J. Rosborough	1986	2017	Chief Judge (2001–2007); Appointed by Tony Earl
Vernon	X	Darcy Rood	2017	2023	
Vernon	X	Timothy J. Gaskell	2023		

=== District 8 Judges ===
Circuit	Branch	Judge	Beginning Year	End Year	Notes
Brown	1	Richard G. Greenwood	1978	1997	
Brown	1	Donald R. Zuidmulder	1997		Chief Judge (2012–2016)
Brown	2	Robert J. Parins	1978	1982	
Brown	2	Vivi L. Dilweg	1982	1999	Appointed by Lee S. Dreyfus
Brown	2	Michael G. Grzeca	1999	2000	Appointed by Tommy Thompson
Brown	2	Mark A. Warpinski	2000	2012	
Brown	2	Thomas J. Walsh	2012		
Brown	3	William J. Duffy	1978	1992	Chief Judge (1982–1988)
Brown	3	Susan Bischel	1992	2012	Chief Judge (2006–2012); Appointed by Tommy Thompson
Brown	3	Tammy Jo Hock	2012		Appointed by Scott Walker
Brown	4	Clarence W. Nier	1978	1982	Chief Judge (1978–1982)
Brown	4	Alexander R. Grant	1982	1991	Appointed by Lee S. Dreyfus
Brown	4	Carl R. Fenwick			Appointed by Tommy Thompson; Died before taking office
Brown	4	John C. Jaekels	1991	1991	Reserve Judge
Brown	4	Donald J. Hanaway	1991	1995	Appointed by Tommy Thompson; Died in office
Brown	4	William C. Griesbach	1995	2002	Appointed by Tommy Thompson; Appointed to U.S. District Court, E.D. Wis.
Brown	4	Kendall M. Kelley	2002	2024	Appointed by Scott McCallum
Brown	4	Samantha S. Wagner	2024		Appointed by Tony Evers
Brown	5	James W. Byers	1978	1981	
Brown	5	Charles E. Kuehn	1981	1987	Appointed by Lee S. Dreyfus
Brown	5	Peter J. Naze	1987	2008	
Brown	5	Marc A. Hammer	2008		Appointed by Jim Doyle
Brown	6	N. Patrick Crooks	1978	1996	Elected to Wisconsin Supreme Court
Brown	6	John D. McKay	1996	2012	Appointed by Tommy Thompson
Brown	6	John P. Zakowski	2012		Appointed by Scott Walker
Brown	7	John C. Jaekels	1978	1988	
Brown	7	Richard Dietz	1988	2007	Appointed by Tommy Thompson
Brown	7	Timothy A. Hinkfuss	2007		
Brown	8	William M. Atkinson	1991	2019	
Brown	8	Beau G. Liegeois	2019		Appointed by Tony Evers
Door	1	Edwin C. Stephan	1978	1988	
Door	1	John D. Koehn	1988	2000	Appointed by Tommy Thompson
Door	1	D. Todd Ehlers	2000	2024	
Door	1	Jennifer Moeller	2024		
Door	2	Peter C. Diltz	1994	2016	
Door	2	David L. Weber	2016		Appointed by Scott Walker
Kewaunee	X	John A. Curtin	1978	1980	
Kewaunee	X	S. Dean Pies	1980	1992	
Kewaunee	X	Dennis J. Mleziva	1992	2016	
Kewaunee	X	Keith A. Mehn	2016	2022	
Kewaunee	X	Jeffrey R. Wisnicky	2022		
Marinette	1	Charles D. Heath	1978	2002	
Marinette	1	David G. Miron	2002	2020	Appointed by Tommy Thompson
Marinette	1	Jane M. Sequin	2020	2024	
Marinette	1	Peggy Miller	2024		Appointed by Tony Evers
Marinette	2	William M. Donovan	1978	1990	
Marinette	2	Tim A. Duket	1990	2012	
Marinette	2	James A. Morrison	2012		Chief Judge (2016–2022); Appointed by Scott Walker
Oconto	1	Edward P. Herald	1978	1980	
Oconto	1	John M. Wiebusch	1980	1993	Appointed by Lee S. Dreyfus
Oconto	1	Larry L. Jeske	1993	2007	Appointed by Tommy Thompson
Oconto	1	Michael T. Judge	2007		
Oconto	2	Richard D. Delforge	1998	2010	
Oconto	2	Jay N. Conley	2010		
Outagamie	1	Gordon Myse	1978	1984	
Outagamie	1	James T. Bayorgeon	1984	2004	Appointed by Tony Earl
Outagamie	1	Brad Priebe	2004	2005	Appointed by Jim Doyle
Outagamie	1	Mark J. McGinnis	2005	2025	
Outagamie	1	Whitney Healy	2025		Appointed by Tony Evers
Outagamie	2	Urban Van Susteran	1978	1985	
Outagamie	2	Dennis C. Luebke	1985	2007	Appointed by Tony Earl
Outagamie	2	Nancy J. Krueger	2007	2019	Appointed by Jim Doyle
Outagamie	2	Emily I. Lonergan	2019		Appointed by Tony Evers
Outagamie	3	Nick F. Schaeffer	1978	1987	
Outagamie	3	Joseph M. Troy	1987	2007	Chief Judge (2000–2006)
Outagamie	3	Mitchell J. Metropulos	2007		Appointed by Jim Doyle
Outagamie	4	R. Thomas Cane	1978	1981	
Outagamie	4	Harold Vernon Froehlich	1981	2011	Chief Judge (1988–1994); Appointed by Lee S. Dreyfus
Outagamie	4	Gregory B. Gill Jr.	2011	2021	Appointed by Scott Walker; Elected to the Wisconsin Court of Appeals
Outagamie	4	Yadira Rein	2021		Appointed by Tony Evers
Outagamie	5	Michael W. Gage	1985	2017	
Outagamie	5	Carrie Schneider	2017		Chief Judge (2022–present); Appointed by Scott Walker
Outagamie	6	Dee R. Dyer	1988	2014	
Outagamie	6	Vincent Biskupic	2014		Appointed by Scott Walker
Outagamie	7	John A. Des Jardins	1994	2021	
Outagamie	7	Mark G. Schroeder	2021		Appointed by Tony Evers
Waupaca	1	A. Don Zwickey	1978	1980	
Waupaca	1	Philip M. Kirk	1981	2017	Chief Judge (1994–2000); Appointed by Lee S. Dreyfus
Waupaca	1	Troy L. Nielsen	2017		Appointed by Scott Walker
Waupaca	2	Nathan E. Wiese	1978	1985	
Waupaca	2	John P. Hoffmann	1985	2013	Appointed by Tony Earl
Waupaca	2	Keith A. Steckbauer	2014	2014	Appointed by Scott Walker
Waupaca	2	Vicki L. Clussman	2014		
Waupaca	3	Raymond S. Huber	2000	2025	Died in office
Waupaca	3	Diane Meulemans	2026		Appointed by Tony Evers

=== District 9 Judges ===
Circuit	Branch	Judge	Beginning Year	End Year	Notes
Forest–Florence	X	Frederick H. Fowle	1978	1984	
Forest–Florence	X	James W. Karch	1984	1989	Appointed by Tony Earl
Forest–Florence	X	Robert A. Kennedy Jr.	1989	2008	Appointed by Tommy Thompson
Forest–Florence	X	Leon D. Stenz	2008		
Iron	X	Alex J. Raineri	1978	1981	
Iron	X	John P. Varda	1982	1987	Appointed by Lee S. Dreyfus
Iron	X	Patrick John Madden	1987	2019	Appointed by Tony Earl; Died in office
Iron	X	Anthony J. Stella Jr.	2019		Appointed by Tony Evers Transitioned to District 10
Langlade	X	Ralph J. Strandberg	1978	1980	Died in office
Langlade	X	James P. Jansen	1980	2005	Appointed by Lee S. Dreyfus
Langlade	X	Fred W. Kawalski	2005	2014	Appointed by Jim Doyle
Langlade	X	John Rhode	2015		Appointed by Scott Walker
Lincoln	1	Donald E. Schnabel	1978	1980	
Lincoln	1	John Michael Nolan	1980	2004	
Lincoln	1	Jay R. Tlusty	2004	2022	
Lincoln	1	Galen Bayne-Allison	2022		
Lincoln	2	Glenn H. Hartley	1999	2012	
Lincoln	2	John M. Yackel	2012	2013	Appointed by Scott Walker
Lincoln	2	Robert R. Russell	2013	2025	
Lincoln	2	Jessica Fehrenbach	2025		
Marathon	1	Ronald D. Keberle	1978	1988	Chief Judge (1978–1983)
Marathon	1	Michael W. Hoover	1988	1997	Elected to Wisconsin Court of Appeals
Marathon	1	Dorothy L. Bain	1997	2009	Chief Judge (2004–2008); Appointed by Tommy Thompson
Marathon	1	Jill N. Falstad	2009	2020	Appointed by Jim Doyle
Marathon	1	Suzanne C. O'Neill	2020		Appointed by Tony Evers
Marathon	2	Leo D. Crooks	1978	1988	
Marathon	2	Raymond F. Thums	1988	2004	Appointed by Tommy Thompson
Marathon	2	Gregory Huber	2004	2022	Chief Judge (2016–2022); Appointed by Jim Doyle
Marathon	2	Rick Cveykus	2022		
Marathon	3	Daniel L. LaRocque	1978	1985	Chief Judge (1983–1985); Appointed to Wisconsin Court of Appeals
Marathon	3	Ann Walsh Bradley	1985	1995	Appointed by Tony Earl; Elected to Wisconsin Supreme Court
Marathon	3	Vincent K. Howard	1995	2013	Appointed by Tommy Thompson
Marathon	3	Lamont K. Jacobson	2013		Appointed by Scott Walker
Marathon	4	John W. Stevens	1979	1982	
Marathon	4	Vincent K. Howard	1982	1995	Appointed by Lee S. Dreyfus
Marathon	4	Gregory Grau	1995	2016	Chief Judge (2008–2012)
Marathon	4	Gregory J. Strasser	2016		Appointed by Scott Walker
Marathon	5	Patrick Brady	1999	2011	
Marathon	5	Michael K. Moran	2011		Appointed by Scott Walker
Marathon	6	Scott M. Corbett	2021		
Menominee–Shawano	1	Michael G. Eberlein	1978	1983	
Menominee–Shawano	1	Earl W. Schmidt	1983	2002	Chief Judge (1992–1998); Appointed by Lee S. Dreyfus
Menominee–Shawano	1	James R. Habeck	2002	2020	
Menominee–Shawano	1	Tony A. Kordus			Elected but declined to serve
Menominee–Shawano	1	Katherine Sloma	2020		Appointed by Tony Evers
Menominee–Shawano	2	Thomas G. Grover	1978	2011	
Menominee–Shawano	2	William F. Kussel Jr.	2011		Appointed by Scott Walker
Oneida	1	Robert E. Kinney	1978	2007	
Oneida	1	Patrick F. O'Melia	2007	2022	Appointed by Jim Doyle
Oneida	1	Mary Roth Burns	2022	2023	Appointed by Tony Evers
Oneida	1	Michael W. Schiek	2023		
Oneida	2	Mark A. Mangerson	1988	2011	Appointed to Wisconsin Court of Appeals
Oneida	2	Michael H. Bloom	2012	2024	Appointed by Scott Walker
Oneida	2	Mary M. Sowinski	2024		
Portage	1	Thomas B. Eagon	2012	2022	Appointed by Scott Walker; District 6 before Aug. 1, 2018
Portage	1	Michael Zell	2022		Appointed by Tony Evers
Portage	2	Robert J. Shannon	2015	2022	Appointed by Scott Walker; District 6 before Aug. 1, 2018
Portage	2	Louis J. Molepske Jr.	2022		
Portage	3	Thomas T. Flugaur	1994	2020	District 6 before Aug. 1, 2018
Portage	3	Patricia Baker	2020		Appointed by Tony Evers
Price	X	David A. Clapp	1978	1984	
Price	X	Douglas T. Fox	1984	2017	
Price	X	Kevin G. Klein	2017	2024	Appointed by Scott Walker
Price	X	Mark T. Fuhr	2024		
Taylor	X	Peter J. Seidl	1978	1979	
Taylor	X	Gary L. Carlson	1979	2008	Chief Judge (1985–1992)
Taylor	X	Ann Knox-Bauer	2008		Chief Judge (2022–present); Appointed by Jim Doyle
Vilas	X	Timothy L. Vocke	1978	1983	
Vilas	X	James B. Mohr	1983	2003	Chief Judge (1998–2004); Appointed by Tony Earl
Vilas	X	Neal A. Nielsen III	2003	2021	Chief Judge (2012–2016); Appointed by Jim Doyle
Vilas	1	Martha Milanowski	2021		Appointed by Tony Evers
Vilas	2	Daniel Overbey	2022		
Wood	1	Gregory J. Potter	2001	2024	Appointed by Scott McCallum; District 6 before Aug. 1, 2018
Wood	1	Gregory J. Jerabek	2024		Appointed by Tony Evers
Wood	2	Nicholas J. Brazeau Jr.	2011		Appointed by Scott Walker; District 6 before Aug. 1, 2018
Wood	3	Todd P. Wolf	2009	2025	District 6 before Aug. 1, 2018
Wood	3	Emily Nolan-Plutchak	2025		Appointed by Tony Evers
Wood	4	Timothy Gebert	2023		

=== District 10 Judges ===
Circuit	Branch	Judge	Beginning Year	End Year	Notes
Ashland	X	William E. Chase	1978	1994	
Ashland	X	Robert E. Eaton	1994	2018	Appointed by Tommy Thompson
Ashland	X	Kelly J. McKnight	2018		
Barron	1	Frederick E. Van Sickle	1978	1979	
Barron	1	James C. Eaton	1979	2004	
Barron	1	James C. Babler	2004		Appointed by Jim Doyle
Barron	2	Edward R. Brunner	1988	2007	Chief Judge (1999–2005); Elected to Wisconsin Court of Appeals
Barron	2	Timothy M. Doyle	2007	2014	Appointed by Jim Doyle
Barron	2	J. Michael Bitney	2013	2023	Appointed by Scott Walker
Barron	2	Samuel L. Lawton	2024		Appointed by Tony Evers after election
Barron	3	James D. Babbitt	2008	2014	
Barron	3	Maureen D. Boyle	2014		Chief Judge (2018–2024); Appointed by Scott Walker
Bayfield	X	Robert N. Ledin	1978	1982	
Bayfield	X	Thomas J. Gallagher	1982	2003	Chief Judge (1990–1996); Appointed by Lee S. Dreyfus
Bayfield	X	John H. Priebe	2003	2004	Appointed by Scott McCallum
Bayfield	X	John P. Anderson	2004		Chief Judge (2024–present)
Burnett	X	Harry F. Gunderson	1978	1992	
Burnett	X	James H. Taylor	1992	2002	Appointed by Tommy Thompson
Burnett	X	Michael J. Gableman	2002	2008	Appointed by Scott McCallum; Elected to Wisconsin Supreme Court
Burnett	X	Kenneth L. Kutz	2008	2017	Appointed by Jim Doyle
Burnett	X	Melissia R. Mogen	2017		Appointed by Scott Walker
Chippewa	1	Robert F. Pfiffner	1978	1984	
Chippewa	1	Roderick A. Cameron	1984	2017	Appointed by Tony Earl
Chippewa	1	Steven H. Gibbs	2017		Appointed by Scott Walker
Chippewa	2	Richard H. Stafford	1978	1995	
Chippewa	2	Thomas J. Sazama	1995	2009	Appointed by Tommy Thompson
Chippewa	2	James Isaacson	2009		Appointed by Jim Doyle
Chippewa	3	Steven R. Cray	2008	2020	
Chippewa	3	Benjamin Lane	2020		
Douglas	1	Arthur A. Cirilli	1978	1985	Chief Judge (1978–1984)
Douglas	1	Michael T. Lucci	1985	2009	
Douglas	1	Kelly J. Thimm	2009		
Douglas	2	Douglas S. Moodie	1978	1983	
Douglas	2	Joseph A. McDonald	1983	2002	
Douglas	2	George L. Glonek	2002		Appointed by Scott McCallum
Douglas	3	Henry N. Leveroos	1978	1980	Branch abolished
Dunn	1	Donna J. Muza	1978	1996	
Dunn	1	William C. Stewart, Jr.	1996	2014	
Dunn	1	James M. Peterson	2014		Appointed by Scott Walker
Dunn	2	James A. Wendland	1991	1997	
Dunn	2	Rod W. Smeltzer	1997	2021	
Dunn	2	Christina Mayer	2021		
Dunn	3	Luke M. Wagner	2021		
Eau Claire	1	Thomas H. Barland	1978	2000	
Eau Claire	1	Lisa K. Stark	2000	2013	Elected to Wisconsin Court of Appeals
Eau Claire	1	Kristina M. Bourget	2013	2015	Appointed by Scott Walker
Eau Claire	1	Brian Wright	2015	2016	Appointed by Scott Walker
Eau Claire	1	John F. Manydeeds	2016		
Eau Claire	2	William D. O'Brien	1978	1992	Chief Judge (1984–1990)
Eau Claire	2	Eric J. Wahl	1993	2007	Appointed by Tommy Thompson
Eau Claire	2	Michael Schumacher	2008	2024	Appointed by Jim Doyle
Eau Claire	2	Douglas J. Hoffer	2024		Appointed by Tony Evers
Eau Claire	3	Karl F. Peplau	1978	1983	
Eau Claire	3	Gregory A. Peterson	1983	1999	Chief Judge (1996–1999); Elected to Wisconsin Court of Appeals
Eau Claire	3	William M. Gabler, Sr.	1999	2018	Appointed by Tommy Thompson
Eau Claire	3	Emily M. Long	2018		
Eau Claire	4	Benjamin D. Proctor	1988	2011	Chief Judge (2005–2011)
Eau Claire	4	Jon M. Theisen	2011		Appointed by Scott Walker
Eau Claire	5	Paul J. Lenz	1994	2017	
Eau Claire	5	Shaughnessy Murphy	2017	2018	Appointed by Scott Walker
Eau Claire	5	Sarah Harless	2018		
Eau Claire	6	Beverly Wickstrom	2022		
Iron	X	Anthony J. Stella, Jr.	2019		Transitioned from District 9 on Jul. 1, 2020
Polk	1	Robert O. Weisel	1978	1984	
Polk	1	James Erickson	1984	2002	
Polk	1	Molly E. GaleWyrick	2002	2016	
Polk	1	Daniel J. Tolan	2016		Appointed by Scott Walker
Polk	2	Robert H. Rasmussen	1991	2010	
Polk	2	Jeffrey L. Anderson	2011		Appointed by Scott Walker
Rusk	X	Donald J. Sterlinske	1978	1985	
Rusk	X	Patrick A. Henderson	1985	1986	Appointed by Tony Earl
Rusk	X	Frederick Henderson	1986	2010	Appointed by Tony Earl
Rusk	X	Steven P. Anderson	2010	2022	Appointed by Jim Doyle
Rusk	X	Annette Barna	2022		
Sawyer	1	Alvin L. Kelsey	1978	1991	
Sawyer	1	Norman L. Yackel	1991	2009	Appointed by Tommy Thompson
Sawyer	1	Jerry Wright	2009	2015	
Sawyer	1	John M. Yackel	2015		Appointed by Scott Walker
Sawyer	2	Monica M. Isham	2023		
St. Croix	1	John G. Bartholomew	1978	1990	
St. Croix	1	Eric J. Lundell	1990	2018	Appointed by Tommy Thompson
St. Croix	1	Scott J. Nordstrand	2019		Appointed by Scott Walker
St. Croix	2	Joseph W. Hughes	1978	1983	
St. Croix	2	Phillip Todryk	1983	1989	
St. Croix	2	Conrad A. Richards	1989	2001	
St. Croix	2	Edward F. Vlack III	2001	2025	
St. Croix	2	Brian T. Smestad	2025		
St. Croix	3	Scott R. Needham	1994		Chief Judge (2011–2018)
St. Croix	4	Howard Cameron	2008	2015	
St. Croix	4	R. Michael Waterman	2015		Appointed by Scott Walker
Washburn	X	Warren Winton	1978	1997	
Washburn	X	Eugene D. Harrington	1997	2019	
Washburn	X	Angeline E. Winton	2019		Appointed by Tony Evers

== Numbered Circuits (1848–1978) ==
=== 1st Circuit (1848) ===
Circuit	Branch	Judge	Beginning Year	End Year	Notes
1	X	Edward V. Whiton	1848	1853	Elected to Chief Justice of the Wisconsin Supreme Court
1	X	Wyman Spooner	1853	1853	Appointed by Leonard J. Farwell
1	X	James Rood Doolittle	1853	1856	
1	X	Charles Minton Baker	1856	1857	Appointed by William A. Barstow
1	X	John M. Keep	1857	1858	
1	X	David Noggle	1858	1865	Appointed by Alexander Randall
1	X	William P. Lyon	1865	1871	
1	X	Robert Harkness	1871	1875	
1	X	Ira C. Paine	1875	1876	
1	X	John T. Wentworth	1876	1884	
1	X	John B. Winslow	1884	1891	Appointed to Wisconsin Supreme Court
1	X	Frank M. Fish	1891	1902	Appointed by George Wilbur Peck
1	X	Ellsworth B. Belden	1902	1939	
1	X	Alfred L. Drury	1939	1956	Appointed by Julius P. Heil
1	X	M. Eugene Baker	1956	1974	Medically disabled
1	1	Gerald J. Boileau	1972	1973	Acting
1	1	Earl D. Morton	1973	1978	
1	2	Harold M. Bode	1966	1978	

=== 2nd Circuit (1848) ===
Circuit	Branch	Judge	Beginning Year	End Year	Notes
2	X	Levi Hubbell	1848	1856	2nd Chief Justice of the original Wisconsin Supreme Court; Impeached but not removed from office
2	X	Alexander Randall	1856	1857	Appointed by Coles Bashford
2	X	Arthur MacArthur Sr.	1857	1869	
2	X	Jason Downer	1869	1869	Appointed by Lucius Fairchild
2	X	David W. Small	1869	1880	
2	X	Charles A. Hamilton	1880	1888	
2	X	Daniel Harris Johnson	1888	1900	Died in office
2	1	Lawrence W. Halsey	1900	1924	
2	1	Otto H. Breidenbach	1924	1954	
2	1	Leo B. Hanley	1954	1966	Appointed to Wisconsin Supreme Court
2	1	George D. Young	1968	1974	Declared incapacitated in 1972
2	1	Elmer W. Roller	1973	1974	Acting
2	1	Louis J. Ceci	1974	1978	
2	2	Eugene S. Elliott	1900	1902	
2	2	Warren D. Tarrant	1902	1912	Died in office
2	2	Oscar M. Fritz	1912	1929	Appointed to Wisconsin Supreme Court
2	2	Daniel W. Sullivan	1929	1952	Died in office
2	2	Ronold A. Drechsler	1952	1953	Appointed by Walter J. Kohler Jr.
2	2	Michael T. Sullivan	1954	1963	
2	2	Max Raskin	1963	1973	Appointed by John W. Reynolds Jr.
2	2	George Burns	1973	1978	
2	3	Orrin T. Williams	1904	1916	
2	3	John J. Gregory	1916	1939	Died in office
2	3	Roland J. Steinle	1940	1953	Appointed by Julius P. Heil
2	3	Elmer W. Roller	1954	1955	Appointed by Walter J. Kohler Jr.
2	3	Myron L. Gordon	1955	1961	Appointed by Walter J. Kohler Jr.
2	3	John A. Decker	1961	1978	
2	4	John C. Ludwig	1907	1917	
2	4	Walter Schinz	1917	1954	
2	4	Robert C. Cannon	1954	1978	
2	5	William J. Turner	1906	1919	
2	5	Gustav G. Gehrz	1919	1957	
2	5	Elmer W. Roller	1957	1972	
2	5	Ralph Podell	1972	1978	
2	6	Franz C. Eschweiler	1911	1916	
2	6	Edward T. Fairchild	1916	1930	Appointed to Wisconsin Supreme Court
2	6	John C. Kleczka	1930	1953	Appointed by Walter J. Kohler Sr.
2	6	Francis X. Swietlik	1953	1959	Resigned
2	6	Robert W. Landry	1959	1978	Appointed by Gaylord Nelson
2	7	Augustus E. Braun	1926	1953	
2	7	Ronold A. Drechsler	1953	1973	Appointed by Walter J. Kohler Jr.
2	7	John F. Foley	1973	1978	
2	8	Charles L. Aarons	1926	1950	
2	8	William I. O'Neill	1950	1973	
2	8	Michael J. Barron	1973	1978	
2	9	Richard J. Hennessey	1934	1940	
2	9	William F. Shaughnessy	1940	1960	
2	9	Robert M. Curley	1960	1978	Appointed by Gaylord Nelson
2	10	Harvey L. Neelen	1955	1977	
2	10	Ted E. Wedemeyer Jr.	1977	1978	Transitioned to Milwaukee Circuit, Branch 10
2	11	Herbert Steffes	1962	1975	
2	11	Christ T. Seraphim	1975	1978	
2	12	John Louis Coffey	1962	1978	Elected to the Wisconsin Supreme Court
2	13	Robert W. Hansen	1960	1967	
2	13	Maurice Spracker	1967	1976	
2	13	Victor Manian	1976	1978	
2	14	Leander J. Foley Jr.	1965	1978	
2	15	Marvin C. Holz	1967	1978	
2	16	William R. Moser	1967	1978	
2	17	Hugh R. O'Connell	1968	1978	
2	18	Christ T. Seraphim	1973	1974	
2	18	Harold B. Jackson Jr.	1975	1978	Appointed by Patrick Lucey
2	19	John E. McCormick	1976	1978	Transitioned to Milwaukee Circuit, Branch 19

=== 3rd Circuit (1848) ===
Circuit	Branch	Judge	Beginning Year	End Year	Notes
3	X	Charles H. Larrabee	1848	1858	
3	X	A. Scott Sloan	1858	1859	Appointed by Alexander Randall
3	X	John E. Mann	1859	1867	
3	X	David J. Pulling	1867	1873	
3	X	Eli C. Lewis	1873	1874	
3	X	David J. Pulling	1874	1885	
3	X	George W. Burnell	1885	1922	
3	X	Fred Beglinger	1922	1937	
3	X	Henry P. Hughes	1937	1947	Appointed by Philip La Follette
3	X	Helmuth F. Arps	1947	1963	
3	X	Arnold J. Cane	1963	1968	Died in office
3	1	William E. Crane	1968	1978	Transitioned to Winnebago Circuit, Branch 1
3	2	Edmund P. Arpin	1970	1978	Transitioned to Winnebago Circuit, Branch 2

=== 4th Circuit (1848) ===
Judge	Beginning Year	End Year	Notes
Alexander W. Stow	1848	1851	Chief Justice of the original Wisconsin Supreme Court
Timothy O. Howe	1851	1853	
William R. Gorsline	1853	1858	
David Taylor	1858	1869	
Campbell McLean	1869	1881	
Norman S. Gilson	1881	1899	
Michael Kirwan	1899	1929	
Edward Voigt	1929	1935	
Henry A. Detling	1935	1953	
Ferdinand H. Schlichting	1953	1973	
Allan J. Deehr	1973	1978	Transitioned to Manitowoc Circuit, Branch 1

=== 5th Circuit (1848) ===
Judge	Beginning Year	End Year	Notes
Mortimer M. Jackson	1848	1853	
Montgomery M. Cothren	1853	1865	
Joseph T. Mills	1865	1877	
Montgomery M. Cothren	1877	1883	
George Clementson	1883	1920	
Levi H. Bancroft	1920	1921	Appointed by Emanuel L. Philipp
Sherman E. Smalley	1921	1943	
Arthur W. Kopp	1943	1955	
Richard W. Orton	1955	1978	

=== 6th Circuit (1850) ===
Judge	Beginning Year	End Year	Notes
Wiram Knowlton	1850	1853	
George Gale	1856	1863	
Isaac E. Messmore	1861	1861	Appointed by Alexander Randall, but the appointment was deemed illegal.
Edwin Flint	1863	1869	
Romanzo Bunn	1869	1877	Appointed by Lucius Fairchild
Alfred W. Newman	1878	1893	
Joseph M. Morrow	1893	1894	Appointed by George Wilbur Peck
Orvis B. Wyman	1894	1900	
John J. Fruit	1900	1910	
Edward C. Higbee	1910	1925	
Robert S. Cowie	1925	1951	Died in office
Leonard F. Roroff	1951	1952	Appointed by Walter J. Kohler Jr.
Lincoln Neprud	1952	1970	
Peter G. Pappas	1970	1978	Transitioned to La Crosse Circuit, Branch 1

=== 7th Circuit (1854) ===
Judge	Beginning Year	End Year	Notes
George W. Cate	1854	1875	
Gilbert L. Park	1875	1884	
Charles M. Webb	1884	1911	
Byron B. Park	1911	1939	
Herman J. Severson	1939	1950	Died in office
Herbert A. Bunde	1950	1969	Appointed by Oscar Rennebohm
James H. Levi	1969	1978	

=== 8th Circuit (1855) ===
Judge	Beginning Year	End Year	Notes
S. S. N. Fuller	1855	1860	
Henry D. Barron	1860	1861	
Lucien P. Wetherby	1861	1866	
Herman L. Humphrey	1867	1877	Resigned after election to U.S. House.
Egbert B. Bundy	1878	1897	
Eugene W. Helms	1897	1915	
George Thompson	1915	1947	Died in office
Kenneth S. White	1947	1957	Appointed by Oscar Rennebohm
Robert G. Varnum	1957	1968	
John G. Bartholomew	1968	1978	

=== 9th Circuit (1855) ===
Circuit	Branch	Judge	Beginning Year	End Year	Notes
9	X	Alexander L. Collins	1856	1858	
9	X	Luther S. Dixon	1858	1859	Appointed by Alexander Randall
9	X	Harlow S. Orton	1859	1864	Appointed by Alexander Randall
9	X	Alva Stewart	1864	1889	
9	X	Robert G. Siebecker	1890	1903	
9	X	E. Ray Stevens	1903	1926	Appointed by Robert M. La Follette Sr. Elected to Wisconsin Supreme Court
9	X	Herman W. Sachtjen	1926	1927	Appointed by John J. Blaine
9	1	Albert G. Zimmerman	1927	1936	Died in office
9	1	Alvin C. Reis	1936	1956	Died in office
9	1	Richard W. Bardwell	1956	1978	Appointed by Walter J. Kohler Jr.
9	2	August C. Hoppmann	1927	1943	Died in office
9	2	Herman W. Sachtjen	1943	1956	
9	2	Edwin M. Wilkie	1956	1967	Appointed by Walter J. Kohler Jr.
9	2	Wilmarth L. Jackman	1967	1975	
9	2	Michael B. Torphy Jr.	1975	1978	
9	3	Norris Maloney	1958	1977	
9	3	P. Charles Jones	1977	1978	
9	4	William C. Sachtjen	1966	1978	

=== 10th Circuit (1855) ===
Judge	Beginning Year	End Year	Notes
Stephen Rossiter Cotton	1855	1861	
Edwin Wheeler	1861	1864	Died in office
Ganem W. Washburn	1864	1870	Appointed by James T. Lewis; Redistricted out of office
Ezra T. Sprague	1870	1871	Appointed by Thaddeus C. Pound (acting governor)
Eleazor H. Ellis	1871	1879	
George H. Meyers	1880	1892	
John Goodland	1892	1916	
Edgar V. Werner	1916	1940	
Joseph McCarthy	1940	1947	Elected U.S. senator
Michael G. Eberlein	1947	1954	
Andrew W. Parnell	1954	1972	
Gordon Myse	1972	1978	

=== 11th Circuit (1864) ===
Judge	Beginning Year	End Year	Notes
Solon H. Clough	1864	1877	
Henry D. Barron	1877	1882	
Solon H. Clough	1882	1889	
Roujet D. Marshall	1889	1895	Appointed to Wisconsin Supreme Court
Aad J. Vinje	1895	1910	Appointed by William H. Upham
Frank A. Ross	1910	1919	
William R. Foley	1919	1940	Died in office
Charles A. Taylor	1940	1941	
Carl H. Daley	1941	1967	
Allen Kinney	1967	1976	Died in office
John P. Foley	1976	1978	Appointed by Patrick Lucey

=== 12th Circuit (1871) ===
Judge	Beginning Year	End Year	Notes
Harmon S. Conger	1871	1882	Died in office
John R. Bennett	1883	1899	
Benjamin F. Dunwiddie	1899	1907	
George Grimm	1907	1937	
Jesse Earle	1937	1949	
Harry S. Fox	1949	1959	Died in office
Arthur L. Luebke	1959	1978	Appointed by Gaylord Nelson

=== 13th Circuit (1877) ===
Judge	Beginning Year	End Year	Notes
Alfred W. Newman	1877	1878	
Vacant	1878	1881	
A. Scott Sloan	1881	1895	
Warham Parks	1895	1896	
James J. Dick	1896	1907	
Martin L. Lueck	1907	1922	
Charles M. Davison	1922	1939	Died in office
Henry Lockney	1939	1942	
Edward J. Gehl	1942	1949	Elected to the Wisconsin Supreme Court
Milton L. Meister	1949	1951	Appointed by Oscar Rennebohm
William C. O'Connell	1951	1960	
Henry G. Gergen, Jr.	1960	1978	Transitioned to Dodge Circuit, Branch 1

=== 14th Circuit (1884) ===
Circuit	Branch	Judge	Beginning Year	End Year	Notes
14	X	Samuel D. Hastings Jr.	1884	1914	
14	X	Henry Graas	1914	1946	
14	X	Edward M. Duquaine	1947	1961	
14	1	Donald W. Gleason	1961	1978	
14	2	Raymond J. Rahr	1962	1967	
14	2	Robert J. Parins	1967	1978	Transitioned to Brown Circuit, Branch 2
14	3	William J. Duffy	1968	1978	Transitioned to Brown Circuit, Branch 3

=== 15th Circuit (1888) ===
Judge	Beginning Year	End Year	Notes
John K. Parish	1888	1912	
Gullick N. Risjord	1912	1951	Died in office
Lewis J. Charles	1951	1976	
W. Patrick Donlin	1976	1978	

=== 16th Circuit (1891) ===
Judge	Beginning Year	End Year	Notes
Charles V. Bardeen	1891	1898	Appointed to Wisconsin Supreme Court
Willis C. Silverthorn	1898	1910	Appointed by Edward Scofield
Alexander H. Reid	1910	1937	
George J. Leicht	1937	1941	
Claire B. Bird	1941	1943	
Gerald J. Boileau	1943	1970	
Ronald D. Keberle	1970	1978	Transitioned to Marathon Circuit, Branch 1

=== 17th Circuit (1891) ===
Judge	Beginning Year	End Year	Notes
William F. Bailey	1891	1898	
James O'Neill	1898	1922	
Emery Crosby	1922	1947	Died in office
Bruce F. Beilfuss	1948	1963	Elected to the Wisconsin Supreme Court
Lowell D. Schoengarth	1963	1978	Transitioned to Clark Circuit, Branch 1

=== 18th through 26th Circuits (1900–1978) ===
Circuit	Branch	Judge	Beginning Year	End Year	Notes
18	X	Chester A. Fowler	1905	1929	
18	X	Clayton F. Van Pelt	1929	1944	Appointed by Walter J. Kohler Sr.
18	X	Louis J. Fellenz Sr.	1944	1952	Appointed by Walter Samuel Goodland
18	X	Russell E. Hanson	1953	1968	Appointed by Walter J. Kohler Jr.
18	X	Jerold E. Murphy	1968	1878	
19	X	James Wickham	1910	1944	
19	X	Clarence E. Rinehard	1944	1968	
19	X	Robert F. Pfiffner	1968	1978	
20	X	William B. Quinlan	1912	1928	
20	X	David G. Classon	1928	1930	Appointed by Fred R. Zimmerman
20	X	Arold Francis Murphy	1930	1966	
20	X	James A. Martineau	1966	1977	
21	X	Elmer D. Goodland	1952	1968	
21	1	Howard J. DuRocher	1968	1978	
21	2	Thomas P. Corbett	1969	1978	
22	X	Allen D. Young	1952	1958	
22	1	William E. Gramling	1958	1978	
22	2	Clair H. Voss	1960	1978	
23	X	Merrill R. Farr	1958	1976	Originally the 24th Circ.
23	X	Thomas H. Barland	1976	1978	
24	X	Milton L. Meister	1960	1978	Originally the 25th Circ.
24	X	J. Tom Merriam	1978	1978	
25	X	Robert H. Gollmar	1962	1973	
25	X	Howard Latton	1973	1978	
26	X	Ernst John Watts	1965	1974	
26	X	Erwin C. Zastrow	1974	1978	Transitioned to Walworth Circuit, Branch 1
26	X	Robert H. Gollmar	1977	1978	Acting. Transitioned to Walworth Circuit, Branch 1

== See also ==
- List of justices of the Wisconsin Supreme Court
- Wisconsin circuit courts
- Wisconsin Court of Appeals
- Wisconsin Supreme Court

== Sources ==
- "Wisconsin–Historical Sketch: State Government" (PDF). The Wisconsin Blue Book (Report). Madison, Wisconsin: State of Wisconsin. 1913. p. 539.
- Theobald, H. Rupert; Robbins, Patricia V., eds. (1970). "The Judicial Branch" (PDF). The state of Wisconsin Blue Book, 1970 (Report). Madison, Wisconsin: State of Wisconsin. p. 477.
- Theobald, H. Rupert; Robbins, Patricia V., eds. (1979). "The Judicial Branch" (PDF). The state of Wisconsin 1979-1980 Blue Book (Report). Madison, Wisconsin: State of Wisconsin. pp. 682–686.
- Barish, Lawrence S.; Theobald, H. Rupert, eds. (1989). "The Judicial Branch" (PDF). State of Wisconsin 1989-1990 Blue Book (Report). Madison, Wisconsin: State of Wisconsin. pp. 658–662.
- Barish, Lawrence S.; Meloy, Patricia E., eds. (1999). "The Judicial Branch" (PDF). State of Wisconsin 1999-2000 Blue Book (Report). Madison, Wisconsin: State of Wisconsin. pp. 525–531.
- "Statistics and Reference: Officials: Circuit court judges, April 2, 2019" (PDF). Wisconsin Blue Book 2019-2020 (Report). Madison, Wisconsin: State of Wisconsin. 2019. pp. 637–641. ISBN 978-1-7333817-0-3.
- Canvass Results for 2020 Spring Election and Presidential Preference Vote - 4/7/2020 (PDF) (Report). Wisconsin Elections Commission. May 4, 2020. pp. 3–9.
