= Ernest Keppler =

20th century American politician and judge

The Honorable Ernest C. Keppler

Wisconsin Circuit Judge for the Sheboygan Circuit, Branch 1
- In office January 1, 1979 – July 31, 1985
- Preceded by: Daniel P. Anderson
- Succeeded by: L. Edward Stengel

Member of the Wisconsin Senate from the 20th district
- In office January 2, 1961 – January 1, 1979
- Preceded by: Harold F. Huibregtse
- Succeeded by: David W. Opitz

Member of the Wisconsin State Assembly from the Sheboygan 1st district
- In office January 4, 1943 – January 1, 1945
- Preceded by: Joseph M. Theisen
- Succeeded by: John Schneider Jr.

Personal details
- Born: April 5, 1918 Sheboygan, Wisconsin, U.S.
- Died: May 23, 2001 (aged 83) Sheboygan Memorial Medical Center; Sheboygan, Wisconsin, U.S.
- Resting place: Wildwood Cemetery, Sheboygan, Wisconsin
- Party: Republican
- Spouse: Bertha L. Zurheide (m. 1939–2001)
- Children: 2

Military service
- Allegiance: United States
- Branch/service: United States Army
- Rank: 1st Sergeant
- Battles/wars: World War II: Pacific War; Korean War

Ernest C. Keppler (April 5, 1918 – May 23, 2001) was an American lawyer, jurist, and Republican politician from Sheboygan County, Wisconsin. He served 18 years in the Wisconsin Senate, representing the 20th Senate district from 1961 to 1979, and then served six years as Wisconsin circuit court judge in Sheboygan County. Earlier in life, he also served one term in the Wisconsin State Assembly (1943).

== Biography ==
Born in Sheboygan, Wisconsin, Keppler graduated from the University of Wisconsin and received his law degree from the University of Wisconsin Law School. Keppler served on the Sheboygan Common Council. In 1943, he served in the Wisconsin State Assembly. Keppler served in the United States Army during World War II and the Korean War. In 1961, Keppler began serving in the Wisconsin State Senate. In 1979, he was elected a Wisconsin Circuit Court judge, for Sheboygan County, Wisconsin.

His political career was most notable for a 1969 speech on the Wisconsin State Senate floor in which he lamented that some public employees were making a higher salary than the governor. He asked "How about Har Gobind Khorana? Any of you know him?" Khorana was a researcher at the University of Wisconsin who had won the Nobel Prize the previous year. Khorana was hired by MIT the following year and spent the rest of his career there.

Keppler was married to Bertha Keppler. They had two children, Ernest Michael Keppler and Mary Keppler (Schmidt).

Wisconsin State Assembly
Preceded by Joseph M. Theisen	Member of the Wisconsin State Assembly from the Sheboygan 1st district January 4, 1943 – January 1, 1945	Succeeded by John Schneider Jr.
Wisconsin Senate
Preceded by Harold F. Huibregtse	Member of the Wisconsin Senate from the 20th district January 2, 1961 – January 1, 1979	Succeeded by David W. Opitz
Legal offices
Preceded by Daniel P. Anderson	Wisconsin Circuit Court Judge for the Sheboygan Circuit, Branch 1 January 1, 1979 – July 31, 1985	Succeeded by L. Edward Stengel
