= Courts of Wisconsin =

Courts of Wisconsin include:

State courts of Wisconsin

- Wisconsin Supreme Court (7 justices)
  - Wisconsin Court of Appeals (4 districts, 16 judges)
    - Wisconsin Circuit Court (9 judicial administrative districts (1–5; 7–10), 69 circuits, 261 judges)
      - Wisconsin Municipal Courts

Federal courts located in Wisconsin

- United States District Court for the Eastern District of Wisconsin
- United States District Court for the Western District of Wisconsin

Former federal courts of Wisconsin

- United States District Court for the District of Wisconsin (extinct, subdivided)

== See also ==
- List of Wisconsin circuit court judges
