= John P. Foley (judge) =

20th century American judge

The Honorable John P. Foley

Judge of the Wisconsin Court of Appeals for the 3rd district
- In office August 1, 1978 – November 23, 1984
- Preceded by: Position established
- Succeeded by: Daniel L. LaRocque

Wisconsin Circuit Judge for the 11th Circuit
- In office October 19, 1976 – July 31, 1978
- Appointed by: Patrick Lucey
- Preceded by: Allen Kinney
- Succeeded by: Position abolished

Personal details
- Born: April 19, 1938 Manitowoc, Wisconsin, U.S.
- Died: November 23, 1984 (aged 46) Wausau, Wisconsin, U.S.
- Cause of death: Heart attack
- Resting place: Evergreen Cemetery, Manitowoc
- Spouse: Frances Van Sleet (m. 1964–1984)
- Children: 2
- Parents: John Elmer Foley (father); Adaline (Hampton) Foley (mother)
- Education: University of Wisconsin–Madison; Marquette University Law School

Military service
- Allegiance: United States
- Branch/service: United States Army
- Years of service: 1960–1963

John Patrick Foley II (April 19, 1938 – November 23, 1984) was an American lawyer and jurist from Manitowoc, Wisconsin. He was a judge of the Wisconsin Court of Appeals from 1978 until his death in 1984, and was presiding judge of the 3rd Appeals district for his last three years. He previously served two years as a Wisconsin circuit court judge in northwest Wisconsin.

== Biography ==
John P. Foley was born April 19, 1938, in Manitowoc, Wisconsin. He graduated from Manitowoc's Lincoln High School in 1956; his father died of a heart attack later that year. He went on to attend the University of Wisconsin–Madison, where he earned his bachelor's degree in 1960.

After his college graduation, Foley joined the United States Army, and worked for Army intelligence in Milwaukee for most of that time. In 1961, while living in Milwaukee, he and his future wife, Frances Van Sleet, were neighbors in an apartment building when a gas explosion occurred there. Van Sleet and Foley were listening to records together when the explosion occurred, resulting in minor injuries. Van Sleet's roommate, Charlene Jaecks, was more severely injured, and Foley carried her down to emergency responders. At the time, Van Sleet and Jaecks were working at the Milwaukee Sentinel newspaper.

After leaving the Army, Foley remained in Milwaukee and enrolled in Marquette University Law School, where he obtained his J.D. in 1966. At Marquette, Foley was associate editor of the Marquette Law Review. After completing his legal education, Foley moved to Superior, Wisconsin, and became a partner in a law firm, known as Witkin, Foley, and Weiby.

He remained in private practice for ten years. Following the death of Wisconsin circuit court judge Allen Kinney, in 1976, Foley was appointed to succeed him as judge for the 11th circuit by Governor Patrick Lucey. At that time, the 11th circuit comprised Douglas, Barron, Burnett, Polk, and Washburn counties, in northwestern Wisconsin. The following Spring, Wisconsin voters approved a series of amendments to the state constitution on the structure of the judiciary, including the establishment of a Wisconsin Court of Appeals. Foley chose to run for a seat on the newly-created court in the 1978 elections. Foley ran for the abbreviated two-year term in the 3rd Appeals Court district—comprising most of the northern half of the state. He faced two opponents in the February 1978 primary, Eau Claire attorney Robert G. Evans and Marathon County judge Joseph Kucirek. Kucirek was eliminated in the nonpartisan primary, and Foley prevailed in the general election, receiving 68% of the vote. He was re-elected to a full six-year term in 1980, without opposition. He was named presiding judge for the 3rd district in 1981, following the resignation of Judge W. Patrick Donlin.

Foley died suddenly at age 46, on November 23, 1984. He was discovered on the floor of his Wausau apartment after he failed to show for work. The day before, he told Judge R. Thomas Cane that he felt he had indigestion. An autopsy later found that the cause of death was a heart attack.

== Personal life and family ==
John P. Foley was one of two children born to John Elmer Foley and his wife Adaline (née Hampton).

John P. Foley married Frances Van Sleet in Milwaukee on October 9, 1964. They had two daughters before his death in 1984.

In addition to his legal pursuits, Foley was a member of the Benevolent and Protective Order of Elks and the Society for the Preservation and Encouragement of Barber Shop Quartet Singing in America.

== Electoral history ==
=== Wisconsin Court of Appeals (1978, 1980) ===
Wisconsin Court of Appeals, District III (2-year term) election, 1978
Party	Candidate	Votes	%	±%
Nonpartisan primary, February 21, 1978 (top two)
Nonpartisan	John P. Foley	28,701	52.17%	
Nonpartisan	Robert G. Evans	14,101	25.63%	
Nonpartisan	Joseph C. Kucirek	12,208	22.19%	
Total votes		55,010	100.0%	
General election, April 4, 1978
Nonpartisan	John P. Foley	120,364	68.14%	
Nonpartisan	Robert G. Evans	56,273	31.86%	
Plurality		64,091	36.28%	
Total votes		176,637	100.0%	

Legal offices
Preceded by Allen Kinney	Wisconsin Circuit Judge for the 11th Circuit; October 19, 1976 – July 31, 1978	Circuit abolished
New court established	Judge of the Wisconsin Court of Appeals for the 3rd district August 1, 1978 – November 23, 1984	Succeeded by Daniel L. LaRocque
