= Daniel L. LaRocque =

20th century American judge

The Honorable Daniel L. LaRocque

Judge of the Wisconsin Court of Appeals District III
- In office December 21, 1984 – July 31, 1997
- Appointed by: Tony Earl
- Preceded by: John P. Foley
- Succeeded by: Michael W. Hoover

Chief Judge of the 9th District of Wisconsin Circuit Courts
- In office August 1, 1984 – December 21, 1984
- Preceded by: Ronald Keberle
- Succeeded by: Gary L. Carlson

Wisconsin Circuit Court Judge for the Marathon Circuit, Branch 3
- In office August 1, 1978 – December 21, 1984
- Preceded by: Transitioned from county court
- Succeeded by: Ann Walsh Bradley

County Judge of Marathon County, Wisconsin, Branch 2
- In office January 3, 1978 – July 31, 1978
- Preceded by: Joseph C. Kucirek
- Succeeded by: Transitioned to circ. court

District Attorney of Marathon County, Wisconsin
- In office January 1, 1965 – January 3, 1978
- Preceded by: Patrick L. Crooks
- Succeeded by: Rand Krueger

Personal details
- Born: 1936 (age 89–90)
- Party: Democratic
- Spouses: Rosalie E. LaRocque (m. 1959; div. 1984); Donna J. Seidel (div. 1993); Jean Frey Shearer
- Children: at least 5
- Education: Marquette University Law School; New York University School of Law

Daniel L. LaRocque (born 1936) is a retired American lawyer and judge. He was a Judge of the Wisconsin Court of Appeals for twelve years after serving as a Wisconsin Circuit Court Judge in Marathon County. Prior to his judicial service, he was district attorney for Marathon County for 13 years.

== Early life and education ==
He attended the Central Michigan University College of Journalism and worked briefly for the Milwaukee Journal in 1959 and 1960. He continued his education, however, and earned his law degree from Marquette University Law School in 1962. Later in life, he would return to further his education at the Institute of Judicial Administration at the New York University School of Law.

== Legal career ==
After obtaining his law degree, he briefly worked as an attorney in Wausau, Wisconsin, in partnership with Robert W. Dean—who would also later serve as an Appeals Court judge—but soon was hired as an assistant district attorney in Marathon County, under Patrick L. Crooks.

In 1964, Crooks announced his plans to leave office and endorsed LaRocque as his successor as district attorney. LaRocque went on to win election that November, running on the Democratic Party ticket. He was subsequently re-elected six times as district attorney, serving up until his election to the judiciary.

LaRocque's years as district attorney would be formative for both himself and the Democratic Party of Wisconsin. Among the men who worked as colleagues or employees of LaRocque during this time were: Anthony S. "Tony" Earl, who would become 41st Governor of Wisconsin; Francis E. Bachhuber III, nephew of then-federal judge James Edward Doyle and cousin of future-Governor Jim Doyle; and Dave Obey, who would go on to represent northwestern Wisconsin in the United States House of Representatives for nearly 40 years. Tony Earl, in particular, would be a close ally to LaRocque for the rest of his career.

== Judicial career ==
In 1977, he was elected County Judge in Marathon County and took office the following January. The timing coincided with a significant reorganization of the Wisconsin court system. On August 1, 1978, eight months after he took office, the existing Wisconsin county courts and circuit courts were combined into the current system of Wisconsin circuit courts; LaRocque became a judge of the Marathon circuit. He won re-election in 1984 without opposition, and, later that year, he was appointed Chief Judge of the 9th Judicial Administrative District by the Wisconsin Supreme Court. However, only a few months after beginning his term as Chief Judge, the death of Judge John P. Foley created a vacancy on the Wisconsin Court of Appeals. His old colleague, Governor Tony Earl, appointed him to the vacant seat. He won election to a full term on the court in 1985, and was subsequently re-elected in 1991. He retired at the end of his second full term in 1997, but continued to serve as a reserve judge in circuit and appeals cases for several years.

=== Union decertifications ===
As a reserve judge, LaRocque ruled in one of several cases arising out of the infamous 2011 Budget Repair Law. One of the law's controversial provisions was the requirement for annual recertification elections for unions representing state employees, under a process managed by the Wisconsin Employment Relations Commission (WERC). In 2014, the WERC determined two unions had failed to meet a filing deadline to qualify for recertification, and therefore decertified the unions. The two unions sued in state court and prevailed at the circuit court level. The WERC challenged the ruling to the District I Court of Appeals, where Judge LaRocque sat in with judges William W. Brash III and Kitty K. Brennan. The panel ruled in favor of the unions, finding that, under the plain language of the statute, an incumbent union can only be decertified by an election of the members. The ruling was a significant limitation on a new power claimed under the Budget Repair Law.

== Personal life and family ==
Judge LaRocque has been married three times. He married his first wife, Rosalie, in 1959. They had five children together before they petitioned for divorce in 1982. The divorce was heavily litigated over several years and ultimately resulted in a case before the Wisconsin Supreme Court in 1987 to settle the issues of property and alimony. His second wife was Donna J. Seidel, a Democratic politician who served in the Wisconsin State Assembly. Judge LaRocque and Donna Seidel divorced in 1993. He and his third wife, Jean Frey, moved to Sun Prairie, Wisconsin, after his retirement.

=== Nepotism controversy ===
In 2008, LaRocque's longtime friend, former Governor Tony Earl, was involved in a scandal over the hiring of Judge LaRocque's nephew, also named Daniel LaRocque. In 2005, the younger LaRocque was seeking a position as a lawyer in the Wisconsin Department of Workforce Development, and, at his request, the former Governor contacted the hiring manager to provide a character reference. A review by the Wisconsin Employment Relations Commission found, in 2008, that this had politically tainted the civil service hiring process. After receiving the call from Earl, the hiring manager, Hal Bergan, broke several department rules in the hiring process, including failing to perform reference checks with a previous employer, failing to include members of minority communities in the interview panel, and asking questions which appeared slanted in favor of LaRocque. The hearing examiner ordered the department to pay $346,000 in compensation for two internal candidates who were passed over for the job. For his part, Earl defended his action by stating that his action was not political, but personal, saying, "I've known the family for many, many years. I would not have given him a character reference if I didn't know him well. I was very comfortable doing that."

== Electoral history ==
=== Wisconsin Court of Appeals (1985) ===
Wisconsin Court of Appeals, District III Election, 1985
Party	Candidate	Votes	%	±%
General Election, April 2, 1985
Nonpartisan	Daniel L. LaRocque (incumbent)	75,406	50.32%	
Nonpartisan	Randall E. Morey	74,440	49.68%	
Plurality		966	0.64%	
Total votes		149,846	100.0%	

Legal offices
Preceded by Patrick L. Crooks	District Attorney of Marathon County, Wisconsin; January 1, 1965 – January 3, 1978	Succeeded by Rand Krueger
Preceded by Joseph C. Kucirek	County Judge of Marathon County, Wisconsin, Branch 2 January 3, 1978 – July 31, 1978	Court abolished
New circuit	Wisconsin Circuit Court Judge for the Marathon Circuit, Branch 3 August 1, 1978 – December 21, 1984	Succeeded by Ann Walsh Bradley
Preceded by Ronald Keberle	Chief Judge of the 9th District of Wisconsin Circuit Courts; August 1, 1984 – December 21, 1984	Succeeded by Gary L. Carlson
Preceded by John P. Foley	Judge of the Wisconsin Court of Appeals District III; December 21, 1984 – July 31, 1997	Succeeded by Michael W. Hoover
