= Carl Ashley =

American judge

Chief Judge of the 1st District of Wisconsin Circuit Courts
- Incumbent
- Assumed office May 2023
- Preceded by: Mary Triggiano

Wisconsin Circuit Judge for the Milwaukee Circuit, Branch 33
- Incumbent
- Assumed office August 1, 1999
- Preceded by: Laurence C. Gram Jr.

Personal details
- Born: Milwaukee, Wisconsin, U.S.
- Spouse: Felita Daniels
- Children: 2
- Education: Marquette University (B.S., J.D.)
- Profession: Lawyer, judge

Carl Ashley is an American lawyer and judge from Milwaukee, Wisconsin. He is the chief judge of the 1st district of Wisconsin circuit courts (since 2023), and has served as a Wisconsin circuit court judge in Milwaukee County since 1999. Before his election to the judiciary, he served as a public defender.

== Biography ==
Carl Ashley was born and raised in Milwaukee, attending the Twelfth Street School, St. Boniface Elementary School, Holy Angels Academy, and Marquette University High School; his father died during his high school years. He earned his bachelor's degree from Milwaukee's Marquette University, and immediately entered Marquette University Law School, obtaining his J.D. in 1983.

He started his legal career as a public defender, and continued in that service for nine years. In 1992, he opened his own private law firm, taking on a variety of civil, criminal, and family law cases.

When circuit judge Lawrence Gram announced in 1997 that he intended to retire at the end of his term, in 1999, Ashley decided that he would run to succeed him in the 1999 spring election. Ultimately, Ashley faced no opponent in the election, and won a six-year term as a Wisconsin circuit court judge. He has gone on to win re-election in 2005, 2011, 2017, and 2023.

Over the next two decades, he served as a judge in each major court division in the Milwaukee circuit, including misdemeanor, felony, family court, large civil claims, and children's court, as well as stints in the adult drug treatment court, the veterans treatment court, and the domestic violence court. Beyond his normal judicial responsibilities, he has taken on many other roles in the state judicial and legal community, including service on the Wisconsin Supreme Court's Planning and Policy Advisory Committee, and service as faculty in the Wisconsin Judicial College.

Shortly after the 2023 election, the Wisconsin Supreme Court appointed Ashley as chief judge of Wisconsin's 1st judicial administrative district. He was re-appointed to another two-year term as chief judge in 2025.

== Personal life and family ==
Carl Ashley is the fourth of eight children born to John Henry and Louise Ashley. His father was a Korean War veteran, then worked at A. O. Smith in Milwaukee until his death in 1972. His mother was a teacher's aide in the Milwaukee Public Schools, and later worked for the Milwaukee County government.

Carl Ashley and his wife, Felita Daniels Ashley, reside in Milwaukee; they have two adult children.

Legal offices
Preceded by Laurence C. Gram Jr.	Wisconsin Circuit Judge for the Milwaukee Circuit, Branch 33; August 1, 1999 – present	Incumbent
Preceded by Mary Triggiano	Chief Judge of the 1st District of Wisconsin Circuit Courts; May 2023 – present	Incumbent
