= Joseph M. Theisen =

American politician and businessman

Joseph M. Theisen (February 24, 1877 – December 29, 1946) was an American politician and businessman.

Born in Sheboygan, Wisconsin, Theisen went to Sheboygan Business College. Theisen did office work and worked as an accountant for various businesses in Sheboygan. He also edited a column "Forty Years Ago" for the Sheboygan Press and was a jailer for the Sheboygan County Sheriff Department. Theisen served on the Sheboygan Library Board and the Sheboygan Common Council. Theisen served in the Wisconsin State Assembly from 1933 to 1939 and in 1941 and was a Democrat. Theisen died suddenly at his home in Sheboygan.
