= Daniel P. Anderson =

American judge

Daniel P. Anderson is a former presiding judge of the Wisconsin Court of Appeals.

== Biography ==
A native of Plymouth, Wisconsin, Anderson served in the United States Air Force, achieving the rank of captain. He earned the Air Force Commendation Medal with oak leaf cluster during his service time. Later, he graduated cum laude from the University of Wisconsin Law School and went into private practice with his father.

== Judicial career ==
Anderson was appointed to the Sheboygan County, Wisconsin Court by Governor Martin J. Schreiber in 1978. The following year, he was elected to the Wisconsin Circuit Court. He was re-elected in 1985 and served on the Circuit Court, eventually becoming a Presiding Judge, until his election to the Court of Appeals in 1990. Anderson served on the Court of Appeals from 1990 to 2011, serving as Presiding Judge three times. First, from 1993 to 1996; second, from 2003 to 2005; and third, from 2007 to 2009.
