= Wisconsin circuit courts =

State trial courts in Wisconsin, US

Wisconsin Circuit Court System
- Established: August 1848
- Jurisdiction: Wisconsin
- Composition method: Nonpartisan election from within judicial circuit
- Authorised by: Wis. Const. Art VII § 8
- Appeals to: Wisconsin Court of Appeals
- Judge term length: Six years, no term limit
- Number of positions: 261
- Annual budget: $243,098,300
- Website: Official site

Division map

The Wisconsin circuit courts are the general trial courts in the U.S. state of Wisconsin. There are currently 261 judicial seats and 69 circuits in the state circuit court system, with circuit boundaries largely matching county boundaries. The 69 circuits are divided into nine judicial administrative districts. Circuit court judges hear and decide both civil and criminal cases.

Each circuit court judge is elected for a six-year term. There is no term limit or mandatory retirement age for Wisconsin circuit court judges. Judicial vacancies are filled by gubernatorial appointment without any need for legislative confirmation; appointed judges serve a temporary term that expires after the next spring election. (Note: If the vacancy occurs before December 1 of the year, then the "next" election is April in the following year; if the vacancy occurs after December 1, then the "next" election is the April of the 2nd following year.) The circuit court judiciary is also supplemented by retired reserve judges, who often fill in for vacancies, illnesses, or when the caseload necessitates additional resources; reserve judges are appointed and assigned at the sole discretion of the Chief Justice of the Wisconsin Supreme Court.

== Structure of the circuit courts ==
The circuit court system is composed of 69 circuits, with 66 circuits serving a single county, and three circuits serving two counties each. Buffalo and Pepin counties share a circuit, as do Florence and Forest counties. Shawano County shares its circuit with Menominee County, which is coterminous with the Menominee Indian Reservation and was formerly part of Shawano County itself. 26 circuit courts are served by a single judge. For those circuits with more than one judge, each is elected to a particular seat, or "branch" within the court. The Milwaukee County Circuit Court has the greatest number of branches with 47.

The circuit courts are organized into 9 geographical administrative districts. Within each district the Wisconsin Supreme Court will appoint a chief judge, a deputy chief judge, and a professional district court administrator. With the exception of Milwaukee County, chief judges and their deputies continue to hear cases while serving. Chief judges assign judges to hear only a specific type of case (e.g. civil, criminal, juvenile), equalize the flow of cases, establish court policies and rules, and supervise the finances of the courts they administer. They also work closely with county boards on security, facility, and staffing issues. The chief judges and district court administration meet regularly with the director of state courts to discuss current issues and to advise the Supreme court and the director on matters of statewide concern.

In 2017, Wisconsin's Supreme Court created a new business court, the Commercial Docket Pilot Project, located in the Waukesha County Circuit Court and the Eighth Judicial Administrative District. On April 1, 2019, the Supreme Court expanded the Commercial Docket's geographic jurisdiction to encompass the entire state. In 2020, the Supreme Court issued an Order adding the Dane County Circuit Court as a location for a pilot project business court. The Supreme Court issued an Order on June 29, 2022, extending the pilot project to July 30, 2024. While Wisconsin still has the remnant of a business court as of October 2024, by a 4–3 vote its Supreme Court issued an order on October 7, 2024, ending the assignment of new cases to the commercial court pilot project, first established by that court in April 2017.

== Jurisdiction ==
The Wisconsin circuit courts have original jurisdiction to hear all civil and criminal matters within the state. The court's jurisdiction is conferred by Article VII, Section 8 of the Wisconsin Constitution and is quite broad. Since the court's subject matter jurisdiction is constitutional rather than statutory, the Wisconsin Legislature cannot limit it by statute. By comparison, the United States Congress is empowered to limit the subject matter jurisdiction of federal District Courts if it so chooses.

The geographic limitations of the circuit court's authority are referred to as "personal jurisdiction." In a civil case, the requirements for personal jurisdiction are governed by chapter 801.05 of the Wisconsin Statutes. Generally speaking, a defendant must either be present in the state, or have sufficient contacts with the state, and the pleadings must have been properly served on the defendant. Personal jurisdiction requirements in a civil case are driven by policy considerations, such as fairness to the defendant, comity, and principals of federalism.

The circuit court has personal jurisdiction over a defendant in a criminal case if the defendant violates a Wisconsin law while physically present in Wisconsin. Wisconsin courts also have personal jurisdiction over a defendant who commits an act while out of state that contributes to a crime, the consequences of which occur in Wisconsin.

== Limits on exercise of power to decide cases ==
There are, however, limits on what cases the circuit courts will hear. They will not hear a case if the parties lack standing, or if the case is moot or is not ripe. Additionally, the circuit court will not hear a case in which it lacks competency. State law distinguishes between the court's jurisdiction (power to hear a case) and its competency (ability to arrive at a valid judgment in a case). A court lacks competency if certain statutory requirements are not satisfied, for example, time limits for filing suit, or requirements as to which circuit should decide a case.

In addition, the courts are constrained from taking action that will encroach on the powers of the legislative or executive branches. Under the separation of powers doctrine, no branch of government may exercise a power of government assigned exclusively to another branch. The purpose of separating powers among the branches of government is to avoid concentration of governmental power in the hands of a few and to give the various branches the ability to check actions by the other branches.

In reviewing the validity of state laws, the courts are limited to determining whether the law violates any provision of the constitution. The courts may invalidate a law that violates individual rights, such as the right to equal protection or due process, or a law that is not enacted according to the process established in the constitution, for example, a bill that was not passed by a majority of the members of each house of the Wisconsin State Legislature. However, a court may not invalidate a law because the court finds that the legislature's method for addressing a problem was not the most efficient. Nor may the court substitute its determination of what is in the public interest for the determination of the legislature.

While the separation of powers doctrine limits the ability of the courts to act, it also protects the courts from encroachment by the legislature of governor. The Wisconsin Supreme Court established its judicial power in the three-branch system soon after Wisconsin became a state by deciding Bashford v. Barstow (1856), an election case that resulted in the ouster of an incumbent governor.

== Commencing a civil case ==
Civil cases start the same way regardless of the issues or parties involved and regardless of whether the case ultimately goes to trial. A case begins with pleadings, in which the parties state basic claims and responses. The parties then have an opportunity to investigate the claims and gather evidence through a process called discovery. The court generally has little direct involvement in a case until shortly before trial, though the court is available to resolve preliminary matters and disputes.

=== Pleadings ===
The plaintiff starts a civil case by filing a summons, and generally a complaint, with the clerk of circuit court and paying a filing fee. A summons provides notice that a suit has been filed against the defendant and notification that the defendant must answer the complaint. The complaint sets forth the plaintiff's allegations against the defendant. It must contain a short and plain statement of the plaintiff's claim, identify the events out of which the claim arises, and demand relief to satisfy the plaintiff's claim. The plaintiff must serve an authenticated copy of the summons and complaint on the defendant. The favored method for serving the defendant is to personally hand a copy of the summons. Alternatively, the server may hand the summons to another responsible adult at the defendant's residence or, in some cases, it is sufficient for the plaintiff to publish the summons in a newspaper and send it to the defendant's address. Any adult who is not a party to the lawsuit may serve the summons. The person who serves the summons must sign the summons at the time of service and note the date, time, place, and manner of service and upon whom the summons is served. The plaintiff then files proof of service with the court.

A plaintiff must commence a suit by serving the defendant with a summons within a certain time period established by a statute of limitation, or lose the right to sue. Statutes of limitation differ according to the type of suit. For example, a suit for breach of a sales contract must be commenced within six years; a suit for medical malpractice must be commenced within three years of the injury or within one year of discovery of the injury; and a suit to collect child support must be commenced within 20 years after the youngest child for whom support is due turns 18.

The defendant responds to the plaintiff's allegations in a document called an answer. The defendant admits or denies an allegation or state they do not know if the allegation is true, in which case the allegation is taken as denied. The defendant may also raise affirmative defenses (defenses that defeat the plaintiff's claims even if the plaintiff's allegations are true), for example, that the time period for filing the suit has expired, that the service of the summons and complaint was invalid, or that the complaint has already been settled in previous litigation. The defendant may also file a counterclaim against the plaintiff, or a cross-claim against a fellow defendant.

The complaint and the answer together constitute the "pleadings" in a case. The purpose of the pleadings is to provide notice of the claims and defenses. The issues of the case generally are not narrowed until later in the proceedings.

=== Discovery ===
After an action is commenced, the parties begin discovery, which is intended to provide the parties mutual knowledge of facts relevant to a case before trial so that the trial is limited to resolving disputed facts and issues. Discovery also allows the parties to formulate and narrow the issues for trial and obtain and preserve evidence. A recipient of a discovery request generally must provide the information or material requested unless it is readily available from another source or is privileged. The scope of permitted discovery in a civil case is quite broad. A party may use discovery to obtain material that will be inadmissible as evidence at trial as long as the material is reasonably calculated to lead to admissible evidence. Methods of discovery include depositions (recorded interviews with witnesses under oath), interrogatories (written questions), requests for production of documents or things, medical examinations, and requests for admissions.

Ideally and usually, discovery takes place without direct involvement by the court. Except for medical examinations and inspection of medical records, discovery requests need not be authorized by the court. The recipient of a discovery request may seek a protective order denying certain discovery or limiting its scope if the discovery requested will cause annoyance, embarrassment, oppression, or undue burden or expense, or will inquire into privileged or irrelevant matters, and the party requesting discovery may request that the court intervene and order compliance.

=== Pretrial activities in court ===
After the pleadings are filed, the court may hold a scheduling conference with the parties and issue a scheduling order to manage the progress of the case. The scheduling order generally assigns dates for filing motions, amending pleadings, completing discovery, pretrial conferences between the judge and parties, and for trial. Some judges also use the scheduling conference to advise the parties to attempt to settle the case without going to trial.

In civil cases, parties often file a variety of pretrial motions with the court seeking court orders affecting the trial. For example, a defendant may seek dismissal of a whole case or certain issues in the case because the plaintiff has not stated a valid claim. Or, a party may seek an order compelling the opposing party to comply with a discovery request or a ruling on admissibility of certain pieces of evidence at trial. If the court requires additional information before ruling on a motion, the court may hold a hearing and may direct the parties to submit briefs, written materials that state the facts and present each side's position.

The courts resolve motions by order, often directing the prevailing party to prepare the order and submit it to the judge for his or her signature. The resolution of pretrial motions often dictates the future of a case. If a party wins a pretrial motion for summary judgment, the case is dismissed. Sometimes a party who loses important pretrial motions is more likely to agree to a settlement. A settlement must be accepted by a judge. Judges usually accept settlement agreements in civil cases with minimal review, although they look more closely at settlement agreements in divorce cases. If the parties do not settle, the case proceeds to trial.

== Commencing a criminal case ==
Only the state may bring a criminal case. Generally a prosecutor starts a criminal case by filing a complaint. The court is directly involved in a criminal case from the beginning to protect the rights of the defendant. Parties have a right to discovery in a criminal case, but discovery is not as extensive in a criminal case as in a civil case because the state must have completed most of its investigation before bringing criminal charges.

=== The criminal complaint ===
Most criminal cases are started when a prosecutor, either a district attorney (who represents a county) or the attorney general (who represents the state), files a complaint with the court. The complaint states the crime charged, names the defendant, and gives the date, approximate time, and location of the crime. In a complaint, the district attorney also presents sufficient facts to show why the defendant is being charged, identifies the source of the information contained in the complaint, and provides reasons why the source should be believed.

Prosecution of most crimes must be commenced within a certain time period that is established by a statute of limitation. The state generally has six years to commence prosecution of a felony (a crime for which a person may be sentenced to one year or more in prison) and three years for a misdemeanor (a crime for which the maximum penalty is a year in jail). However, there is no time limit for the prosecution of homicide. The main purpose of time limits is to ensure that criminal cases are tried while the evidence is still available and witnesses' memories are fresh. A case is commenced when a warrant, summons, or indictment is issued or an information is filed.

=== Pretrial court appearances ===
The defendant's first court date is called the initial appearance. The court informs the defendant of the charges filed against him or her and gives the defendant a copy of the complaint. The court also informs the defendant of his or her right to have an attorney and that if the defendant is indigent and requests counsel, the court will appoint an attorney. If the defendant is in custody, the court determines whether to release the defendant on bail, and if the defendant is released, imposes conditions for bail. In a misdemeanor case, the court may set the trial date at the initial appearance. The next court action in a misdemeanor case is the arraignment. Further steps are required in a felony case. At the initial appearance, the court informs felony defendants that they are entitled to a preliminary examination before the criminal case may go forward.

The purpose of a preliminary examination is to determine in a felony case whether the district attorney can show probable cause to believe that the defendant committed a felony. If not, the court must dismiss the felony complaint. At the preliminary examination the district attorney and defendant may call witnesses and present evidence. If the court determines that the district attorney has shown probable cause or the defendant waives the right to a preliminary examination, the case goes forward. The prosecutor files a pleading called an "information," which informs the court of the crime with which the defendant is charged and states the date and place of the crime.

An arraignment is held in both misdemeanor and felony cases. At the arraignment, the complaint or information is read out loud unless the defendant waives reading, and in a felony case the district attorney gives the defendant a copy of the information. The court then asks the defendant to submit a plea. The defendant may plead "guilty", "no contest", "not guilty", or "not guilty by reason of mental disease or defect". A plea of no contest has the same effect in a criminal case as a guilty plea, except it cannot be used as an admission of criminal action in a civil case. The defendant may not enter a plea of no contest without approval from the court. If the defendant pleads guilty or no contest, the court sentences the defendant or places the defendant on probation. If the defendant pleads not guilty or not guilty by reason of mental disease or defect, the case proceeds to trial.

== Grand jury and John Doe proceedings ==
Although the vast majority of criminal cases in Wisconsin are begun by a district attorney filing a criminal complaint, some cases are commenced as the result of a grand jury or John Doe investigation. Grand jury and John Doe investigations are secret proceedings for which witnesses may be subpoenaed. Grand jury and John Doe proceedings are generally used when investigators need to take testimony under oath or compel a witness to testify in order to gather sufficient evidence to issue a criminal complaint.

A judge, usually upon the request of a district attorney, may assemble a grand jury to investigate suspected criminal activity. A grand jury consists of 17 people selected for jury service. The grand jury may request that the prosecutor subpoena and examine witnesses. Upon completing an investigation, a grand jury may by the vote of at least 14 members return an indictment, which is a written accusation that a person committed a crime. If the grand jury returns an indictment, the court issues a summons or warrant for the defendant.

A judge initiates a John Doe proceeding upon receiving a complaint about criminal activity from any person, including the district attorney. The judge must question the person who makes the complaint under oath and may subpoena and examine other witnesses (usually with the assistance of the district attorney). If the judge finds probable cause to believe that a person has committed a crime, a written complaint is filed and the judge issues a warrant for the arrest of the defendant named in the complaint.

=== Discovery ===
Discovery in a criminal case is generally less extensive than in a civil case. Discovery allows the parties to obtain certain information known by the opposing party. Upon request, the prosecution and defense must provide a list of witnesses it intends to call at trial, as well as statements of the witnesses, reports of expert witnesses, and any known criminal record of a witness. The parties must also disclose any physical evidence they intend to introduce at trial. A party may obtain a court order allowing scientific testing of evidence held by the opposing party. The prosecution must disclose statements made by the defendant that pertain to the crime or that the prosecution intends to introduce at trial. The prosecution is obligated to disclose exculpatory evidence (evidence that might weigh in the defendant's favor) to the defendant even if the defendant does not specifically request the information or material.

=== Pretrial motions and plea bargains ===
Parties in a criminal case often file pretrial motions. Common motions include motions to exclude physical evidence, a defendant's confession, or an eyewitness identification of the defendant. The court may require the attorneys to submit briefs on the motions, but briefing is less common on pretrial motions in criminal cases than civil cases.

Most criminal cases do not go to trial. Instead the prosecution and defense negotiate a settlement. The parties may agree upon the crimes to which a defendant will plead guilty and a sentence recommendation, or may only agree on the plea. The judge must review the agreement on the plea before accepting it to ensure that there is sufficient reason to believe that the defendant is guilty of the crime. If the parties agree on a sentence recommendation, the judge must review it to determine if it is appropriate. The judge is not bound by the sentence agreement.

== Trial of a civil or criminal case ==
The proceedings in a trial of a civil or criminal case are similar. Both may be to a jury or judge. Both start with opening statements, proceed to presentation of evidence followed by closing statements, and culminate with a decision. Depending on the result of the trial, a civil case may end with the awarding of damages and a criminal trial may end with sentencing. During the trial, the role of the judge is similar – determining the admissibility of evidence, guiding the jury, if there is one, and refereeing the actions of the attorneys.

== Current judges ==
Circuit judges are elected to a six year term in the spring non-partisan election, currently Wisconsin holds a non-partisan primary election in February and a general election in April. New judicial terms start on the first day of August in the year of the election.

In the event of a vacancy, the Governor can appoint an interim judge to hold office until the next spring election.

=== District 1 ===
- Counties: Milwaukee
- Court: Milwaukee, Wisconsin
- Chief Judge: Carl Ashley
- Court Administrator: Stephanie Garbo

Circuit	Branch	Judge	Entered office	Next election	Notes
Milwaukee	1	Jack Dávila	2020	2027	Appointed by Tony Evers
Milwaukee	2	Milton Childs	2019	2026	Appointed by Tony Evers
Milwaukee	3	Katie Kegel	2021	2027	Elected in 2021
Milwaukee	4	Michael J. Hanrahan	2017	2029	
Milwaukee	5	Kristela Cervera	2021	2028	Appointed by Tony Evers
Milwaukee	6	John Remington	2024	2031	Appointed by Tony Evers
Milwaukee	7	Thomas J. McAdams	2014	2026	
Milwaukee	8	William Sosnay	2000	2030	
Milwaukee	9	Malinda Eskra	2026	2027	Appointed by Tony Evers
Milwaukee	10	Michelle A. Havas	2017	2029	
Milwaukee	11	David C. Swanson	2013	2031	
Milwaukee	12	David L. Borowski	2003	2027	
Milwaukee	13	Ana Berrios-Schroeder	2023	2029	
Milwaukee	14	Amber Raffeet August	2023	2030	Appointed by Tony Evers
Milwaukee	15	Jonathan D. Watts	2009	2027	
Milwaukee	16	Brittany C. Grayson	2019	2026	Appointed by Tony Evers
Milwaukee	17	Carolina Maria Stark	2012	2030	
Milwaukee	18	Ronnie V. Murray II	2023	2030	Appointed by Tony Evers
Milwaukee	19	Kori L. Ashley	2020	2027	Appointed by Tony Evers
Milwaukee	20	Joseph R. Wall	2018	2030	Appointed by Scott Walker
Milwaukee	21	Cynthia M. Davis	2015	2029	Appointed by Scott Walker
Milwaukee	22	Timothy M. Witkowiak	2002	2027	Appointed by Scott McCallum
Milwaukee	23	Jorge Fragoso	2023	2030	Appointed by Tony Evers
Milwaukee	24	Raphael Ramos	2023	2030	Appointed by Tony Evers
Milwaukee	25	Nidhi Kashyap	2022	2028	
Milwaukee	26	William S. Pocan	2006	2031	Appointed by Jim Doyle
Milwaukee	27	Kevin E. Martens	2001	2026	Appointed by Scott McCallum
Milwaukee	28	Mark A. Sanders	2012	2030	
Milwaukee	29	Rebecca A. Kiefer	2020	2026	
Milwaukee	30	Jonathan D. Richards	2020	2027	Appointed by Tony Evers
Milwaukee	31	Owen Piotrowski	2026	2027	Appointed by Tony Evers
Milwaukee	32	Laura Gramling Perez	2014	2026	
Milwaukee	33	Carl Ashley	1999	2029	
Milwaukee	34	Jay Pucek	2026	2027	Appointed by Tony Evers
Milwaukee	35	Frederick C. Rosa	2004	2029	Appointed by Jim Doyle
Milwaukee	36	Laura A. Crivello	2018	2031	Appointed by Scott Walker
Milwaukee	37	T. Christopher Dee	2014	2027	Appointed by Scott Walker
Milwaukee	38	Tanner Kilander	2026	2027	Appointed by Tony Evers
Milwaukee	39	Jane V. Carroll	2006	2030	
Milwaukee	40	Danielle L. Shelton	2019	2031	
Milwaukee	41	Lena Taylor	2024	2031	Appointed by Tony Evers
Milwaukee	42	Reyna Morales	2020	2027	Appointed by Tony Evers
Milwaukee	43	Marisabel Cabrera	2024	2030	
Milwaukee	44	Gwen Connolly	2016	2028	
Milwaukee	45	Jean Marie Kies	2016	2028	
Milwaukee	46	Anderson Gansner	2023	2030	Appointed by Tony Evers
Milwaukee	47	Kristy Yang	2017	2029	

=== District 2 ===
- Counties: Kenosha, Racine, Walworth
- Court: Racine, Wisconsin
- Chief Judge: Wynne Laufenberg
- Court Administrator: Louis Moore

Circuit	Branch	Judge	Entered office	Next election	Notes
Kenosha	1	Gerad Dougvillo	2021	2027	
Kenosha	2	Jason A. Rossell	2011	2030	Appointed by Scott Walker
Kenosha	3	Heather Iverson	2024	2030	
Kenosha	4	David Hughes	2026	2027	Appointed by Tony Evers
Kenosha	5	David P. Wilk	2014	2027	Appointed by Scott Walker
Kenosha	6	Angelina Gabriele	2021	2027	
Kenosha	7	Jodi L. Meier	2016	2029	Appointed by Scott Walker
Kenosha	8	Chad G. Kerkman	2009	2027	
Racine	1	Wynne P. Laufenberg	2016	2030	Appointed by Scott Walker
Racine	2	Eugene Gasiorkiewicz	2010	2028	
Racine	3	Jessica Lynott	2024	2030	
Racine	4	Scott Craig	2024	2031	Appointed by Tony Evers
Racine	5	Kristin M. Cafferty	2021	2028	Appointed by Tony Evers
Racine	6	David W. Paulson	2015	2027	
Racine	7	Jamie McClendon	2025	2031	
Racine	8	Faye M. Flancher	2002	2027	Appointed by Scott McCallum
Racine	9	Robert S. Repischak	2017	2030	Appointed by Scott Walker
Racine	10	Timothy D. Boyle	2012	2030	
Walworth	1	Estee E. Scholtz	2024	2030	
Walworth	2	Daniel S. Johnson	2016	2028	
Walworth	3	Kristine E. Drettwan	2014	2027	Appointed by Scott Walker
Walworth	4	Samuel Berg	2026	2027	Appointed by Tony Evers

=== District 3 ===
- Counties: Dodge, Jefferson, Ozaukee, Washington, Waukesha
- Court: Waukesha, Wisconsin
- Chief Judge: Paul Bugenhagen Jr.
- Court Administrator: Michael Neimon

Circuit	Branch	Judge	Entered office	Next election	Notes
Dodge	1	Brian A. Pfitzinger	2008	2026	
Dodge	2	Martin J. De Vries	2016	2029	Appointed by Scott Walker
Dodge	3	Chad Wozniak	2025	2031	
Dodge	4	Kristine A. Snow	2020	2026	
Jefferson	1	William V. Gruber	2018	2031	Appointed by Scott Walker
Jefferson	2	Theresa A. Beck	2024	2031	Appointed by Tony Evers
Jefferson	3	Robert F. Dehring Jr.	2016	2030	Appointed by Scott Walker
Jefferson	4	Bennett J. Brantmeier	2017	2029	
Ozaukee	1	Adam Y. Gerol	2024	2031	Appointed by Tony Evers
Ozaukee	2	Steve Cain	2019	2031	
Ozaukee	3	Sandy A. Williams	2009	2027	Appointed by Jim Doyle after election
Washington	1	Ryan Hetzel	2022	2029	Appointed by Tony Evers
Washington	2	Gordon Leech	2025	2026	Appointed by Tony Evers
Washington	3	Michael Kenitz	2022	2029	Appointed by Tony Evers
Washington	4	Sandra J. Giernoth	2020	2027	Appointed by Tony Evers
Waukesha	1	Scott Wagner	2025	2031	
Waukesha	2	Jennifer Dorow	2011	2030	Appointed by Scott Walker
Waukesha	3	Ralph M. Ramirez	1999	2029	
Waukesha	4	David Maas	2025	2031	
Waukesha	5	J. Arthur Melvin III	2020	2026	
Waukesha	6	Zach Wittchow	2025	2031	
Waukesha	7	Cody Horlacher	2023	2029	
Waukesha	8	Michael P. Maxwell	2015	2027	
Waukesha	9	Michael Aprahamian	2014	2027	Appointed by Scott Walker
Waukesha	10	Paul Bugenhagen Jr.	2015	2027	
Waukesha	11	William Domina	2010	2029	Appointed by Jim Doyle
Waukesha	12	Jack A. Pitzo	2024	2030	

=== District 4 ===
- Counties: Calumet, Fond du Lac, Green Lake, Manitowoc, Marquette, Sheboygan, Waushara, Winnebago
- Court: Oshkosh, Wisconsin
- Chief Judge: Guy D. Dutcher
- Court Administrator: Jon Bellows

Circuit	Branch	Judge	Entered office	Next election	Notes
Calumet	1	Jeffrey S. Froehlich	2012	2030	
Calumet	2	Carey John Reed	2021	2027	
Fond du Lac	1	Anthony Nehls	2022	2030	Appointed by Tony Evers
Fond du Lac	2	Laura Lavey	2022	2028	
Fond du Lac	3	Andrew J. Christenson	2021	2027	
Fond du Lac	4	Tricia L. Walker	2021	2028	Appointed by Tony Evers
Fond du Lac	5	Douglas R. Edelstein	2022	2028	
Green Lake		Mark Slate	2011	2029	
Manitowoc	1	Mark R. Rohrer	2013	2031	
Manitowoc	2	Jerilyn M. Dietz	2018	2030	
Manitowoc	3	Bob Dewane	2017	2029	
Manitowoc	4	Anthony A. Lambrecht	2023	2029	
Marquette		Chad A. Hendee	2019	2031	
Sheboygan	1	Samantha Bastil	2021	2027	
Sheboygan	2	Natasha L. Torry	2023	2029	
Sheboygan	3	Angela Sutkiewicz	2010	2029	Appointed by Jim Doyle
Sheboygan	4	Rebecca Persick	2015	2027	
Sheboygan	5	George Limbeck	2023	2029	
Waushara	1	Guy Dutcher	2005	2029	
Waushara	2	Scott C. Blader	2022	2028	
Winnebago	1	Michael D. Rust	2024	2030	
Winnebago	2	Scott C. Woldt	2004	2029	Appointed by Jim Doyle
Winnebago	3	Bryan D. Keberlein	2022	2028	
Winnebago	4	Mike Gibbs	2022	2028	
Winnebago	5	John Jorgensen	2010	2028	
Winnebago	6	Daniel J. Bissett	2011	2029	

=== District 5 ===
- Counties: Columbia, Dane, Green, Lafayette, Rock, Sauk
- Court: Madison, Wisconsin
- Chief Judge: Julie Genovese
- Court Administrator: Amber Peterson

Circuit	Branch	Judge	Entered office	Next election	Notes
Columbia	1	Todd J. Hepler	2015	2027	
Columbia	2	W. Andrew Voigt	2011	2029	
Columbia	3	Roger L. Klopp	2024	2030	
Dane	1	Benjamin Jones	2025	2026	Appointed by Tony Evers
Dane	2	Payal Khandhar	2024	2031	Appointed by Tony Evers
Dane	3	Diane Schlipper	2022	2028	
Dane	4	Everett Mitchell	2016	2028	
Dane	5	Nicholas J. McNamara	2009	2028	Appointed by Jim Doyle
Dane	6	Nia Trammell	2020	2027	Appointed by Tony Evers
Dane	7	Mario D. White	2020	2027	Appointed by Tony Evers
Dane	8	Stephanie Hilton	2025	2026	Appointed by Tony Evers
Dane	9	Jacob B. Frost	2020	2027	Appointed by Tony Evers
Dane	10	Ryan D. Nilsestuen	2022	2030	Appointed by Tony Evers
Dane	11	Ellen K. Berz	2012	2030	
Dane	12	Ann Peacock	2023	2030	Appointed by Tony Evers
Dane	13	Julie Genovese	2009	2027	
Dane	14	John D. Hyland	2016	2028	
Dane	15	Stephen Ehlke	2009	2028	Appointed by Jim Doyle
Dane	16	Rhonda L. Lanford	2013	2031	
Dane	17	David D. Conway	2020	2027	Appointed by Tony Evers
Green	1	Faun Marie Phillipson	2021	2027	
Green	2	Jane Bucher	2024	2031	Appointed by Tony Evers
Lafayette		Jenna Gill	2024	2031	Appointed by Tony Evers
Rock	1	Karl R. Hanson	2018	2031	Appointed by Scott Walker
Rock	2	Derrick A. Grubb	2018	2031	Appointed by Scott Walker
Rock	3	Jeffrey S. Kuglitsch	2017	2030	Appointed by Scott Walker
Rock	4	Ashley Morse	2022	2029	Appointed by Tony Evers
Rock	5	Mike Haakenson	2015	2027	
Rock	6	John M. Wood	2016	2029	Appointed by Scott Walker
Rock	7	Barbara W. McCrory	2012	2030	
Sauk	1	Michael P. Screnock	2015	2028	Appointed by Scott Walker
Sauk	2	Wendy J. N. Klicko	2016	2028	
Sauk	3	Blake J. Duren	2024	2030	

=== District 6 ===
The 6th District contained Adams, Clark, Columbia, Dodge, Green Lake, Juneau, Marquette, Portage, Sauk, Waushara, and Wood counties. Eliminated by order of the Wisconsin Supreme Court, effective July 31, 2018, with the 11 counties comprising the district reassigned to five of the remaining judicial districts.

=== District 7 ===
- Counties: Adams, Buffalo, Clark, Crawford, Grant, Iowa, Jackson, Juneau, La Crosse, Monroe, Pepin, Pierce, Richland, Trempealeau, Vernon
- Court: La Crosse, Wisconsin
- Chief Judge: Scott L. Horne
- Court Administrator: Anya Crossland

Circuit	Branch	Judge	Entered office	Next election	Notes
Adams	1	Daniel Glen Wood	2015	2027	
Adams	2	Tania M. Bonnett	2022	2028	
Buffalo–Pepin		Thomas W. Clark	2018	2030	
Clark	1	Lyndsey Boon Brunette	2018	2030	
Clark	2	William Bratcher	2023	2029	
Crawford		Lynn Marie Ryder	2016	2028	
Grant	1	Lisa A. Riniker	2023	2029	
Grant	2	Craig R. Day	2009	2027	
Iowa		Matt Allen	2022	2028	
Jackson	1	Anna L. Becker	2014	2027	Appointed by Scott Walker
Jackson	2	Daniel Diehn	2021	2027	
Juneau	1	Stacy A. Smith	2018	2030	
Juneau	2	Paul S. Curran	2008	2026	
La Crosse	1	Joe Veenstra	2025	2031	
La Crosse	2	Elliott Levine	2007	2031	
La Crosse	3	Mark A. Huesmann	2023	2030	Appointed by Tony Evers
La Crosse	4	Scott L. Horne	2007	2031	
La Crosse	5	Gloria L. Doyle	2015	2027	
Monroe	1	Todd L. Ziegler	2007	2031	
Monroe	2	Mark L. Goodman	2010	2028	
Monroe	3	Rick Radcliffe	2017	2030	Appointed by Scott Walker
Pierce		Elizabeth Rohl	2021	2028	Appointed by Tony Evers
Richland		Lisa McDougal	2022	2029	Appointed by Tony Evers
Trempealeau		Rian W. Radtke	2017	2029	
Vernon		Timothy J. Gaskell	2023	2029	

=== District 8 ===
- Counties: Brown, Door, Kewaunee, Marinette, Oconto, Outagamie, Waupaca
- Court: Green Bay, Wisconsin
- Chief Judge: Carrie A. Schneider
- Court Administrator: Thomas Schappa

Circuit	Branch	Judge	Entered office	Next election	Notes
Brown	1	Donald R. Zuidmulder	1997	2027	
Brown	2	Thomas J. Walsh	2012	2030	
Brown	3	Tammy Jo Hock	2012	2031	Appointed by Scott Walker
Brown	4	Samantha S. Wagner	2024	2031	Appointed by Tony Evers
Brown	5	Marc A. Hammer	2008	2027	Appointed by Jim Doyle
Brown	6	John P. Zakowski	2012	2030	
Brown	7	Timothy A. Hinkfuss	2007	2031	
Brown	8	Beau G. Liegeois	2019	2026	Appointed by Tony Evers
Door	1	Jennifer Moeller	2024	2030	
Door	2	David L. Weber	2016	2029	Appointed by Scott Walker
Kewaunee		Jeffrey R. Wisnicky	2022	2028	
Marinette	1	Peggy L. Miller	2024	2031	Appointed by Tony Evers
Marinette	2	James A. Morrison	2012	2031	Appointed by Scott Walker
Oconto	1	Michael T. Judge	2007	2029	
Oconto	2	Jay N. Conley	2010	2028	
Outagamie	1	Whitney Healy	2025	2027	Appointed by Tony Evers
Outagamie	2	Emily I. Lonergan	2019	2026	Appointed by Tony Evers
Outagamie	3	Mitchell J. Metropulos	2007	2026	Appointed by Jim Doyle
Outagamie	4	Yadira Rein	2021	2028	Appointed by Tony Evers
Outagamie	5	Carrie Schneider	2017	2030	Appointed by Scott Walker
Outagamie	6	Vincent Biskupic	2014	2027	Appointed by Scott Walker
Outagamie	7	Mark G. Schroeder	2021	2028	Appointed by Tony Evers
Waupaca	1	Troy L. Nielsen	2017	2029	
Waupaca	2	Vicki L. Clussman	2014	2026	
Waupaca	3	Diane Meulemans	2026	2027	Appointed by Tony Evers

=== District 9 ===
- Counties: Florence, Forest, Langlade, Lincoln, Marathon, Menominee, Oneida, Portage, Price, Shawano, Taylor, Vilas, Wood
- Court: Wausau, Wisconsin
- Chief Judge: Ann Knox-Bauer
- Court Administrator: Sandra La Du

Circuit	Branch	Judge	Entered office	Next election	Notes
Florence–Forest		Leon D. Stenz	2008	2026	
Langlade		John Rhode	2015	2027	
Lincoln	1	Galen Bayne-Allison	2022	2028	
Lincoln	2	Jessica Fehrenbach	2025	2031	
Marathon	1	Suzanne C. O'Neill	2020	2027	Appointed by Tony Evers
Marathon	2	Rick Cveykus	2022	2028	
Marathon	3	Lamont K. Jacobson	2013	2026	Appointed by Scott Walker
Marathon	4	Gregory J. Strasser	2016	2029	Appointed by Scott Walker
Marathon	5	Michael K. Moran	2011	2029	
Marathon	6	Scott M. Corbett	2021	2027	
Menominee–Shawano	1	Katherine Sloma (Note: Tony A. Kordus was elected in the 2020 election but declined to serve.)	2020	2027	Appointed by Tony Evers
Menominee–Shawano	2	William F. Kussel Jr.	2011	2030	
Oneida	1	Michael W. Schiek	2023	2029	
Oneida	2	Mary M. Sowinski	2024	2030	
Portage	1	Michael Zell	2022	2029	Appointed by Tony Evers
Portage	2	Louis J. Molepske Jr.	2022	2028	
Portage	3	Patricia Baker	2020	2028	Appointed by Tony Evers
Price		Mark T. Fuhr	2024	2030	
Taylor		Ann Knox-Bauer	2008	2027	Appointed by Jim Doyle
Vilas	1	Martha Milanowski	2021	2028	Appointed by Tony Evers
Vilas	2	Daniel Overbey	2022	2028	
Wood	1	Gregory J. Jerabek	2024	2031	Appointed by Tony Evers
Wood	2	Nicholas J. Brazeau Jr.	2011	2030	Appointed by Scott Walker
Wood	3	Emily Nolan-Plutchak	2025	2026	Appointed by Tony Evers
Wood	4	Timothy Gebert	2023	2029	

=== District 10 ===
- Counties: Ashland, Bayfield, Barron, Burnett, Chippewa, Douglas, Dunn, Eau Claire, Iron, Polk, Rusk, Sawyer, St. Croix, Washburn
- Court: Hudson, Wisconsin
- Chief Judge: John P. Anderson
- Court Administrator: Ross Munns

Circuit	Branch	Judge	Entered office	Next election	Notes
Ashland		Kelly J. McKnight	2018	2030	
Barron	1	James C. Babler	2004	2028	
Barron	2	Samuel L. Lawton	2024	2030	Appointed by Tony Evers after election
Barron	3	Maureen D. Boyle	2014	2026	
Bayfield		John P. Anderson	2004	2027	Appointed by Jim Doyle
Burnett		Melissia R. Mogen	2017	2029	
Chippewa	1	Steven H. Gibbs	2017	2030	
Chippewa	2	James Isaacson	2009	2027	
Chippewa	3	Benjamin Lane	2020	2026	
Douglas	1	Kelly J. Thimm	2009	2027	
Douglas	2	George L. Glonek	2002	2027	Appointed by Scott McCallum
Dunn	1	James M. Peterson	2014	2026	
Dunn	2	Christina Mayer	2021	2027	
Dunn	3	Luke M. Wagner	2021	2027	
Eau Claire	1	John F. Manydeeds	2016	2028	
Eau Claire	2	Douglas Hoeffer	2024	2031	Appointed by Tony Evers
Eau Claire	3	Emily M. Long	2018	2030	
Eau Claire	4	Jon M. Theisen	2011	2030	Appointed by Scott Walker
Eau Claire	5	Sarah Harless	2018	2030	
Eau Claire	6	Beverly Wickstrom	2022	2028	
Iron		Anthony J. Stella Jr.	2019	2026	Appointed by Tony Evers
Polk	1	Daniel J. Tolan	2016	2029	
Polk	2	Jeffrey L. Anderson	2011	2029	
Rusk		Annette Barna	2022	2028	
Sawyer	1	John M. Yackel	2015	2027	
Sawyer	2	Monica M. Isham	2023	2029	
St. Croix	1	Scott J. Nordstrand	2019	2026	Appointed by Scott Walker
St. Croix	2	Brian Smestad	2025	2031	
St. Croix	3	Scott R. Needham	1994	2030	
St. Croix	4	R. Michael Waterman	2015	2028	Appointed by Scott Walker
Washburn		Angeline E. Winton	2019	2026	Appointed by Tony Evers

== See also ==
- List of Wisconsin circuit court judges
- Constitution of Wisconsin
- Courts of Wisconsin
- Wisconsin Court of Appeals
- Wisconsin Supreme Court
- John Doe law (Wisconsin)
