= University of Wisconsin Law School alumni =

Following is a list of notable alumni of the University of Wisconsin Law School.

== Athletics ==
- Ken Bowman – Green Bay Packers lineman and member of the Green Bay Packers Hall of Fame
- Pat Richter – former NFL player and athletic director of the University of Wisconsin
- Bill Zito – president of Hockey Operations and general manager of the Florida Panthers

== Academics ==
- Daniel D. Blinka – Marquette University Law School professor
- George Bunn – dean of William Mitchell College of Law and justice of the Minnesota Supreme Court
- Kimberlé Crenshaw – professor of law at the UCLA School of Law and Columbia Law School
- Richard Danner – professor of law, Duke University
- Robben Wright Fleming – president of University of Michigan
- Spencer L. Kimball – dean of law, University of Wisconsin–Madison and former professor of law, University of Chicago
- James E. Krier – professor of law at the University of Michigan, Harvard University, Oxford University, Stanford University, and UCLA
- Stacy Leeds – dean of the University of Arkansas School of Law
- Daniel R. Mandelker – professor of law, Washington University in St. Louis
- John E. Murray Jr. – chancellor and professor of law at Duquesne University
- Mark Nordenberg – chancellor of the University of Pittsburgh
- Frank J. Remington – professor of law, University of Wisconsin–Madison
- Lori Ringhand – interim director of Dean Rusk International Law Center and J. Alton Hosch Professor of Law at the University of Georgia School of Law
- Ediberto Roman – professor of law at Florida International University College of Law
- David Sturtevant Ruder – chairman of the U.S. Securities and Exchange Commission and former dean of law, Northwestern University
- Nicholas S. Zeppos – chancellor of Vanderbilt University

== Business ==
- Alfred S. Regnery – president of Regnery Publishing
- John Rowe – CEO of Exelon
- David Sturtevant Ruder – chairman of the U.S. Securities and Exchange Commission and former dean of law, Northwestern University
- Elmer Winter – founder of Manpower Inc.

== Government ==
- March F. Chase – head of explosives division, War Industries Board
- John E. Lange – U.S. State Department official
- Stewart Simonson – assistant secretary of Public Health Emergency Preparedness

== Judiciary ==
- Shirley Abrahamson – former chief justice of the Wisconsin Supreme Court
- Daniel P. Anderson – presiding judge of the Wisconsin Court of Appeals
- Martha Bablitch – judge of the Wisconsin Court of Appeals
- William A. Bablitch – justice of the Wisconsin Supreme Court
- Charles V. Bardeen – justice of the Wisconsin Supreme Court
- Elmer E. Barlow – justice of the Wisconsin Supreme Court
- John Barnes – justice of the Wisconsin Supreme Court
- Robert McKee Bashford – justice of the Wisconsin Supreme Court
- Bruce F. Beilfuss – justice of the Wisconsin Supreme Court
- Nils Boe – 23rd governor of South Dakota and served as a judge for the United States Customs Court
- Ann Walsh Bradley – justice of the Wisconsin Supreme Court
- Susan Brnovich – judge of the U.S. District Court for the District of Arizona
- Grover L. Broadfoot – chief justice of Wisconsin
- Richard S. Brown – chief judge of the Wisconsin Court of Appeals
- Andrew A. Bruce – justice of the North Dakota Supreme Court
- George Bunn – justice of the Minnesota Supreme Court and dean of William Mitchell College of Law
- Louis B. Butler – justice of the Wisconsin Supreme Court
- William G. Callow – justice of the Wisconsin Supreme Court
- William M. Conley – judge for the U. S. District Court, Western District of Wisconsin
- Barbara Crabb – judge of the U. S. District Court, Western District of Wisconsin
- Charles H. Crownhart – former justice of the Wisconsin Supreme Court
- George R. Currie – chief justice of the Wisconsin Supreme Court
- Roland B. Day – justice of the Wisconsin Supreme Court
- John A. Decker – chief judge of the Wisconsin Court of Appeals
- David G. Deininger – judge of the Wisconsin Court of Appeals
- Christian Doerfler – justice of the Wisconsin Supreme Court
- W. Patrick Donlin – judge of the Wisconsin Court of Appeals and supreme advocate of the Knights of Columbus
- F. Ryan Duffy – judge of the U.S. Court of Appeals and former United States Senator
- Charles P. Dykman – judge of the Wisconsin Court of Appeals
- William Eich – chief judge of the Wisconsin Court of Appeals
- Evan Alfred Evans – judge of the U.S. Court of Appeals for the Seventh Circuit
- Thomas E. Fairchild – senior judge of the U.S. Court of Appeals for the Seventh Circuit
- Chester A. Fowler – justice of the Wisconsin Supreme Court
- Edward J. Gehl – justice of the Wisconsin Supreme Court
- Rachel A. Graham – judge of the Wisconsin Court of Appeals
- Kenneth P. Grubb – judge of the U.S. District Court for the Eastern District of Wisconsin
- David W. Hagen – judge of the U.S. District Court for the District of Nevada
- Oscar Hallam – justice of the Minnesota Supreme Court
- Connor Hansen – justice of the Wisconsin Supreme Court
- Nathan Heffernan – chief justice of Wisconsin Supreme Court
- Paul B. Higginbotham – judge of the Wisconsin Court of Appeals
- Geraldine Hines – justice of the Massachusetts Supreme Court
- Michael W. Hoover – presiding judge of the Wisconsin Court of Appeals
- James C. Kerwin – justice of the Wisconsin Supreme Court
- Claude Luse – judge of the U.S. District Court for the Western District of Wisconsin
- Louis Wescott Myers – chief justice of the California Supreme Court
- Kenneth J. O'Connell – chief justice of the Oregon Supreme Court
- Tawia Modibo Ocran – justice of the Supreme Court of Ghana
- Walter C. Owen – justice of the Wisconsin Supreme Court
- Gregory A. Peterson – judge of the Wisconsin Court of Appeals
- David Prosser Jr. – Wisconsin Supreme Court justice
- Rudolph T. Randa – federal judge of the U.S. District Court for the Eastern District of Wisconsin
- James Ward Rector – Wisconsin Supreme Court justice
- Lowell A. Reed – federal judge of the U.S. District Court for the Eastern District of Pennsylvania
- Paul F. Reilly – judge of the Wisconsin Court of Appeals
- Patience D. Roggensack – justice of the Wisconsin Supreme Court
- Arthur L. Sanborn – judge of the U.S. District Court for the Western District of Wisconsin
- Charles B. Schudson – judge of the Wisconsin Court of Appeals
- Edgar W. Schwellenbach – chief justice of the Washington Supreme Court
- Robert G. Siebecker – chief justice of Wisconsin Supreme Court
- Albert Morris Sames – judge of the U.S. District Court for the District of Arizona
- Burton A. Scott – chief judge of the Wisconsin Court of Appeals
- Donald W. Steinmetz – justice of the Wisconsin Supreme Court
- E. Ray Stevens – justice of the Wisconsin Supreme Court
- Margaret J. Vergeront – judge of the Wisconsin Court of Appeals
- Aad J. Vinje – chief justice of the Wisconsin Supreme Court
- James H. Wakatsuki – justice of the Supreme Court of Hawaii, speaker of the Hawaii House of Representatives
- John D. Wickhem – justice of the Wisconsin Supreme Court
- Jon P. Wilcox – justice of the Wisconsin Supreme Court
- John B. Winslow – chief justice of Wisconsin Supreme Court

== Law ==
- Timothy T. Cronin – U.S. attorney
- Nneka Egbujiobi – lawyer and founder of Hello Africa
- Stephen S. Gregory – lawyer and president of the American Bar Association
- Belle Case La Follette – first woman to graduate from UW Law School (1885); women's suffrage activist, and wife of Robert M. La Follette, Sr.
- Peg Lautenschlager – attorney general of Wisconsin
- Judith L. Lichtman – attorney specializing in women's rights and civil rights
- David W. Márquez – Alaska attorney general
- J.B. Van Hollen – attorney general of Wisconsin
- Hilbert Philip Zarky – tax attorney with the United States Department of Justice and in private practice
- Norma Zarky – attorney

== Military ==
- Robyn J. Blader – U.S. National Guard general
- Ernest R. Feidler – U.S. Coast Guard admiral and Judge Advocate General
- Robert Bruce McCoy – U.S. National Guard major general

== Politics ==
- Thomas Ryum Amlie – U.S. representative
- Gerald K. Anderson – Wisconsin State Assemblyman
- Norman C. Anderson – speaker of the Wisconsin State Assembly
- James N. Azim Jr. – Wisconsin state representative
- Tammy Baldwin – first woman to represent Wisconsin in the U.S. House of Representatives and the United States Senate
- Levi H. Bancroft – attorney general of Wisconsin, speaker of the Wisconsin State Assembly
- Lloyd Barbee – Wisconsin legislator and civil rights activist
- Tom Barrett – U.S. representative
- Peter D. Bear – Wisconsin state senator
- Theodore Benfey – Wisconsin state senator
- Claire B. Bird – Wisconsin state senator
- Nils Boe – 23rd governor of South Dakota and served as a judge for the United States Customs Court
- Theodore W. Brazeau – Wisconsin state senator
- Angie Brooks – president, United Nations General Assembly
- Edward E. Browne – U.S. representative
- Michael E. Burke – U.S. representative
- Howard W. Cameron – Wisconsin state senator
- Fred J. Carpenter – Wisconsin state representative
- Milton Robert Carr – U.S. representative from Michigan
- Richard Cates – Wisconsin legislator and lawyer
- Moses E. Clapp – United States senator
- David G. Classon – U.S. representative
- Clarence Clinton Coe – Wisconsin state representative
- Scott Colom - United States senator-elect from Mississippi
- John Cudahy – U.S. diplomat
- Joseph E. Davies – U.S. diplomat
- Glenn Robert Davis – U.S. representative
- John M. Detling – Wisconsin state representative
- Benjamin W. Diederich – Wisconsin state representative
- Davis A. Donnelly – Wisconsin state senator
- L. J. Fellenz – Wisconsin state senator
- Harold V. Froehlich – U.S. representative
- Edward R. Garvey – labor activist and politician
- Hiram Gill – mayor of Seattle, Washington
- Ansley Gray – Wisconsin state representative
- Mark Andrew Green – U.S. diplomat
- Glenn Grothman – U.S. representative
- Kenneth L. Greenquist – Wisconsin state senator
- Frank H. Hanson – Wisconsin state senator and representative
- George P. Harrington – Wisconsin state representative
- Everis A. Hayes – United States representative
- Knute Hill – United States representative
- George Hudnall – Wisconsin state senator from the 11th District
- Paul O. Husting – U.S. senator
- Lester Johnson – U.S. representative
- Burr W. Jones – U.S. representative
- William Carey Jones – U.S. representative
- Fred F. Kaftan – Wisconsin state senator
- John C. Karel – Wisconsin state representative
- Robert Kastenmeier – U.S. representative
- David Keene – chairman of the American Conservative Union
- Ernest Keppler – Wisconsin Senate and Wisconsin State Assembly
- Warren P. Knowles – governor of Wisconsin
- Arthur W. Kopp – U.S. representative
- Andrew L. Kreutzer – Wisconsin state senator
- Philip La Follette – governor of Wisconsin
- Robert M. La Follette, Sr. – Wisconsin governor, senator and Progressive Party candidate for U.S. president in 1924
- Robert Watson Landry – Wisconsin state representative
- Elmer O. Leatherwood – U.S. representative from Utah
- Olin B. Lewis – Minnesota state politician
- James Manahan – U.S. representative
- Herbert H. Manson – chairman of the Democratic Party of Wisconsin
- Archie McComb – Wisconsin state representative
- Dale McKenna – Wisconsin state senator
- Arthur William McLeod – Wisconsin state representative
- Carroll Metzner – Wisconsin state representative
- Arthur O. Mockrud – Wisconsin state representative
- Thomas Morris – lieutenant governor of Wisconsin
- Elmer A. Morse – U.S. representative
- Gaylord Nelson – governor of Wisconsin, U.S. senator, founder of Earth Day
- John M. Nelson – U.S. representative
- Ivan A. Nestingen – mayor of Madison, Wisconsin
- John Oestreicher – Wisconsin state representative
- Patrick H. O'Rourk – Wisconsin state senator
- Juan Perez – mayor of Sheboygan, Wisconsin
- Charles B. Perry – speaker of the Wisconsin State Assembly
- Richard F. Pettigrew – United States senator
- Vel Phillips – First African-American woman to hold statewide executive office in the United States when elected Secretary of State of Wisconsin in 1978
- William Edmunds Plummer – Wisconsin state representative, United States Senate
- Clifford E. Randall – U.S. representative
- Henry R. Rathbone – U.S. representative
- Michael Reilly – U.S. representative
- Paul Samuel Reinsch – U.S. diplomat
- John W. Reynolds – governor of Wisconsin
- Alan S. Robertson – Wisconsin state representative
- Harry Sauthoff – U.S. representative
- Rudolph Schlabach – Wisconsin legislator and lawyer
- Henry O. Schowalter – Wisconsin state representative
- James Sensenbrenner – U.S. representative and former chair of the House Judiciary Committee
- Roy C. Smelker – Wisconsin state representative
- Edward H. Sprague – Wisconsin state representative
- Paul Soglin – mayor of Madison, Wisconsin
- Bryan Steil – U.S. representative
- James A. Tawney – U.S. representative
- Howard Teasdale – Wisconsin state senator
- Donald Edgar Tewes – U.S. representative from Wisconsin
- William Te Winkle – Wisconsin state senator
- Lewis D. Thill – U.S. representative
- Carl W. Thompson – Wisconsin state senator
- Tommy Thompson – governor of Wisconsin and U.S. secretary of Health and Human Services
- Vernon W. Thomson – governor of Wisconsin
- Eugene A. Toepel – Wisconsin State Assembly
- Phillip James Tuczynski – Wisconsin state representative
- Fran Ulmer – lieutenant governor of Alaska
- Edward Voigt – U.S. representative
- Michael J. Wallrich – Wisconsin state representative
- Thomas J. Walsh – U.S. senator from Montana
- Kenneth S. White – Wisconsin state senator
- Alexander Wiley – U.S. senator
- Herman C. Wipperman – Wisconsin state representative, 1895–1907
- Richard J. Zaborski – Wisconsin state senator
