= Burton A. Scott =

20th century American judge

The Honorable Burton A. Scott

Chief Judge of the Wisconsin Court of Appeals
- In office August 1, 1983 – July 31, 1989
- Preceded by: John A. Decker
- Succeeded by: William Eich

Judge of the Wisconsin Court of Appeals District II
- In office August 1, 1980 – 1991
- Preceded by: Harold M. Bode
- Succeeded by: Harry G. Snyder

Wisconsin Circuit Court Judge for the Kenosha Circuit, Branch 5
- In office August 1, 1978 – July 31, 1980
- Preceded by: Transitioned from County Court
- Succeeded by: Robert V. Baker

County Judge of Kenosha County, Branch 3
- In office 1972 – July 31, 1978
- Appointed by: Patrick Lucey
- Preceded by: Urban J. Zievers
- Succeeded by: Transitioned to Circuit Court

District Attorney of Kenosha County
- In office January 1, 1971 – August 1972
- Preceded by: Joseph B. Molinaro
- Succeeded by: Bruce E. Schroeder

Personal details
- Born: February 16, 1935 Hazel Green, Wisconsin
- Died: April 2, 2007 (aged 72) Somers, Wisconsin
- Spouses: Evelyn C. Magnuson; (m. 1957; died 2019)
- Children: 2
- Parents: Robert Scott (father); Helen (Lampson) Scott (mother)
- Education: University of Wisconsin-Madison (B.A.); University of Wisconsin Law School (J.D.)

Military service
- Allegiance: United States
- Branch/service: United States Army; U.S. Army Security Agency
- Years of service: 1953–1956

Burton A. Scott (February 16, 1935 – April 2, 2007) was an American attorney and judge. He was Chief Judge of the Wisconsin Court of Appeals from 1983 to 1989, near the end of a 19-year judicial career in Wisconsin.

== Biography ==
Scott was born in Hazel Green, Wisconsin, on February 16, 1935. He attended high school in Randolph, Wisconsin and served in the United States Army before graduating from the University of Wisconsin-Madison and the University of Wisconsin Law School.

After working with a private practice, in 1964 Scott became the first corporation counsel to Kenosha County, Wisconsin. The next year he became City Attorney for the city of Kenosha, Wisconsin, serving from 1965 to 1970. In 1970, he was elected District Attorney of Kenosha County but served only one year, when he was appointed County Judge in Kenosha County by Governor Patrick Lucey. He served as County Judge until 1978, when the county courts were merged into the state circuit courts to create a new single level of trial courts. At that time, he became a Wisconsin Circuit Court judge for Kenosha County. In 1980, he was elected to the Wisconsin Court of Appeals in Waukesha-based District II. After 3 years on the court, he was appointed Chief Judge of the Court of Appeals, serving until 1989. In 1988 he served as chair of the National Council of Chief Judges of the Courts of Appeals of the United States.

He retired in 1991 and became an associate dean of the National Judicial College in Reno, Nevada.

== Personal life and family ==
Burton Scott married Evelyn C. Magnuson on December 31, 1957. They had two children. His and his wife's passion for education led them to play an important role in the 1960s campaign to establish a University of Wisconsin branch in the Kenosha area—University of Wisconsin–Parkside. And they also campaigned for the 1978 referendum to fund construction of a new Mary D. Bradford High School building.

Judge Scott died on April 2, 2007, at his home in Somers, Wisconsin.

Legal offices
Preceded by Joseph B. Molinaro	District Attorney of Kenosha County; 1971 – 1972	Succeeded by Bruce E. Schroeder
Preceded by Urban J. Zievers	County Judge of Kenosha County, Branch 3; 1972 – 1978	Succeeded by Court abolished
Preceded by New circuit	Wisconsin Circuit Court Judge for the Kenosha Circuit, Branch 5; 1978 – 1980	Succeeded by Robert V. Baker
Preceded by Harold M. Bode	Judge of the Wisconsin Court of Appeals District II; 1980 – 1991	Succeeded by Harry G. Snyder
Preceded by John A. Decker	Chief Judge of the Wisconsin Court of Appeals; 1983 – 1989	Succeeded by William Eich
