= 2019 Wisconsin elections =

- April 2, 2019

The 2019 Wisconsin spring election was held in the U.S. state of Wisconsin on April 2, 2019. There was one seat on the Wisconsin Supreme Court on the ballot, as well as several other nonpartisan local and judicial elections. There were also a number of local referendums for school funding. The 2019 Wisconsin spring primary was held on February 19, 2019.

There was an additional special election held in the 64th Wisconsin State Assembly district.

In the Supreme Court election, the Republicans' preferred candidate defeated the Democrats' preferred candidate. In all, only one incumbent judge lost their seat in this election, while two others retired.

== Election information ==
=== Turnout ===
Turnout in the April 2 election was 27% of the voting age population.

== State elections ==
=== Legislative ===
==== State Assembly 64th district special election ====
A special election was held to fill the 64th district seat of the Wisconsin State Assembly. The seat was vacated by former Wisconsin Assembly Minority Leader Peter Barca who had been appointed to the cabinet of Governor Tony Evers. At the time of the election, the 64th Assembly district contained the northern half of the city of Kenosha, along with suburban areas of southeastern Racine County. It is considered a safe Democratic seat.

The primary for this seat was held at the spring general election on April 2. Democrat Tip McGuire defeated Gina Walkington and Spencer Zimmerman for the Democratic nomination, while Mark Stalker won the Republican nomination unopposed. The special general election was held on April 30, and McGuire defeated Stalker 62.35% to 37.56%.

=== Judicial ===
Judicial elections were held in 2019.

==== State Supreme Court ====
===== Results =====
2019 Wisconsin Supreme Court election
Party	Candidate	Votes	%
Nonpartisan	Brian Hagedorn	606,414	50.22%
Nonpartisan	Lisa Neubauer	600,433	49.72%
Write-in		722	0.06%
Total votes		1,207,569	100.0%

==== State Court of Appeals ====
Three seats on the Wisconsin Court of Appeals were up for election in 2019. All three were uncontested.

- Judge Mark Gundrum was unopposed seeking re-election to a second full term in District II.
- Judge Lisa K. Stark was unopposed seeking re-election to a second full term in District III.
- In District IV, administrative law judge Jennifer E. Nashold was unopposed in the election to succeed retiring judge Paul Lundsten.

==== State circuit courts ====
Twenty-nine of the state's 249 circuit court seats were up for election in 2019. Only three of those seats were contested. Only one incumbent was defeated for re-election—Milwaukee County Circuit Judge Andrew A. Jones, who had been appointed a year earlier by Governor Scott Walker to fill the vacancy created by Judge Rebecca Dallet's elevation to the Wisconsin Supreme Court.

Circuit	Branch	Incumbent	Elected			Defeated			Defeated in primary
Circuit	Branch	Incumbent	Name	Votes	%	Name	Votes	%	Name(s)
Brown	3	Tammy Jo Hock	Tammy Jo Hock	36,134	99.25%				
Brown	7	Timothy A. Hinkfuss	Timothy A. Hinkfuss	36,900	99.26%				
Dane	16	Rhonda L. Lanford	Rhonda L. Lanford	103,480	99.03%				
Dodge	3	Joseph G. Sciascia	Joseph G. Sciascia	13,303	100.00%				
Jefferson	1	William V. Gruber	William V. Gruber	13,004	99.22%				
Jefferson	2	William F. Hue	William F. Hue	13,239	99.24%				
La Crosse	1	Ramona A. Gonzalez	Ramona A. Gonzalez	15,852	100.00%				
La Crosse	2	Elliott M. Levine	Elliott M. Levine	16,258	100.00%				
La Crosse	3	Todd Bjerke	Todd Bjerke	16,579	100.00%				
La Crosse	4	Scott L. Horne	Scott L. Horne	16,978	100.00%				
Lincoln	2	Robert R. Russell	Robert R. Russell	4,279	99.58%				
Manitowoc	1	Mark R. Rohrer	Mark R. Rohrer	12,629	99.14%				
Marinette	2	James A. Morrison	James A. Morrison	6,867	100.00%				
Marquette		Bernard Ben Built	Chad A. Hendee	2,885	99.28%				
Milwaukee	11	David C. Swanson	David C. Swanson	87,138	98.54%				
Milwaukee	26	William S. Pocan	William S. Pocan	87,258	98.61%				
Milwaukee	36	Laura A. Crivello	Laura A. Crivello	87,994	98.75%				
Milwaukee	40	Andrew A. Jones	Danielle L. Shelton	71,649	57.07%	Andrew A. Jones	53,407	42.54%	
Milwaukee	41	Audrey K. Skwierawski	Audrey K. Skwierawski	85,654	98.73%				
Monroe	1	Todd L. Ziegler	Todd L. Ziegler	7,354	99.69%				
Ozaukee	2	Joe Voiland	Steve Cain	14,800	58.02%	Angela C. Foy	10,650	41.75%	Mark E. Larson; James Wawrzyn
Racine	3	Maureen M. Martinez	Maureen M. Martinez	24,151	98.99%				
Racine	7	Jon E. Fredrickson	Jon E. Fredrickson	18,606	59.59%	Jamie M. McClendon	12,512	40.08%	
Rock	1	Karl R. Hanson	Karl R. Hanson	19,396	99.22%				
Rock	2	Derrick A. Grubb	Derrick A. Grubb	19,185	99.04%				
Rock	4	Daniel T. Dillon	Daniel T. Dillon	18,977	99.17%				
St. Croix	2	Edward F. Vlack	Edward F. Vlack	10,174	99.05%				
Waukesha	1	Michael O. Bohren	Michael O. Bohren	75,867	99.06%				
Waukesha	6	Brad Schimel	Brad Schimel	81,363	97.85%				

== Local elections ==
=== Brown County ===
==== Green Bay mayor ====
- A regularly scheduled mayoral election was held in Green Bay concurrent with the spring election. Democratic former state representative Eric Genrich defeated small business owner Patrick Buckley. Four-term Republican incumbent mayor Jim Schmitt was not a candidate for re-election.

=== Dane County ===
==== Madison mayor ====
- A regularly scheduled mayoral election was held in Madison concurrent with the spring election. Seven-term incumbent mayor Paul Soglin was defeated by former city councilmember Satya Rhodes-Conway.

=== Outagamie County ===
==== Outagamie County executive ====
- A regularly scheduled county executive election was held in Outagamie County concurrent with the spring election. Democratic incumbent executive Tom Nelson was reelected without opposition.

=== Racine County ===
==== Racine mayor ====
- A regularly scheduled mayoral election was held in Racine concurrent with the spring election. Incumbent mayor Cory Mason won his first full term, defeating a write-in campaign by city councilmember Sandy Weidner. Mason had previously won a special election to fill the remainder of the term of Mayor John Dickert, who had resigned.

=== Winnebago County ===
==== Oshkosh mayor ====
- A regularly scheduled mayoral election was held in Oshkosh concurrent with the spring election. Incumbent mayor Steve Cummings was defeated by city councilmember and deputy mayor Lori Palmeri.

=== School referendums ===
- There were 60 local education-funding referendums on the ballot in the 2019 election, at a total value of approximately $1.2 billion. 45 of those referendums passed, awarding the school districts approximately $783 million in additional funding.
