= Jabal es Saaïdé =

Archaeological site and mountain in Lebanon

- جبل سعيدة (Arabic)
- Location within Lebanon
- 34.155444°N 36.228847°E
- Periods: Epipaleolithic, Natufian, PPNA, PPNB
- Location: 12 km (7.5 mi) northeast of Baalbek, Lebanon
- Region: Bekaa
- Part of: Village

History
- Built: c. 10000 BC

Site notes
- Excavation dates: 1966, 1969
- Archaeologists: Bruce Schroeder, Jacques Besançon, Francis Hours
- Condition: ruins
- Public access: Yes

Jabal es Saaïdé (Arabic: جبل سعيدة), Jabal es Saaide, Jabal as Sa`idah, Jabal as Sa`īdah, Jebal Saaidé, Jebel Saaidé or Jabal Saaidé is a Mountain in Lebanon near the inhabited village of Saaïdé, approximately 12 kilometres (7.5 mi) northeast of Baalbek, Lebanon.

Saaidé I & Saaidé II are archaeological sites of note in this area. In the summer of 1966, the Lebanese Army dug a trench at Saaidé I, and recovered many tools and lithics including sickles, grinders, scrapers, chisels, awls and blades suggested to date to the PPNB or PPNA. Jacques Besançon & Francis Hours later discovered a Palaeolithic layer below the Neolithic level, recovering knives, arrowheads, scrapers and retouched blades along with a fragment of a small, flat, cutting axe.

Saaidé II, almost 0.25 hectares (27,000 ft^{2}) in size, was first excavated in 1969 by Bruce Schroeder from the University of Toronto who found the site badly damaged by modern agriculture. Investigations have recovered a wide range of mortars and pestles, scrapers, chisels, borers, retouched microliths, geometric and non-geometric microliths. One grave was found with some tiny skull fragments from an adult aged 45–50 years. Local fauna consisted of turtles, birds (duck, goose, eagle) and mammals (badger, lynx, deer, ox, gazelle, sheep and goat). Jebal Saaidé is the only pre-agricultural village found in Lebanon to date. Inhabitants seem to have hunted different animals including lynx, red deer, gazelle, and some aquatic and migratory birds.

== Literature ==
- Besançon, J. Hours, F,. Une coupe dans le quaternaire récent. Saaidé I (Beqaa centrale, Liban), Hannon, 5, 29–61, 1970.
- Hours, F,. L'épipaléolithique au Liban. Resultats acquis en 1975, Colloque III, UISPP 1976, 9ème Congrès de l'UISPP, Nice, 130–196, 1976.
- Schroeder, H.B., Natufian in the Central Béqaa Valley, Lebanon, Bar-Yosef and Valla (eds.) 1991, The Natufian Culture in the Levant, 43–80, International Monographs in Prehistory, 1991.
- Copeland, L., Natufian Sites in Lebanon, Bar-Yosef and Valla (eds.) 1991, The Natufian Culture in the Levant, 27–42, International Monographs in Prehistory, 1991
- Ofer Bar-Yosef, François Raymond Valla,. The Natufian culture in the Levant, International Monographs in Prehistory, 1991.
- Soliveres, O., « Restes humains natoufiens du Jebal Saaidé (Epipaléolithique du Liban) », Paléorient, 3, p. 293-294, 1975-1976-1977.
- Churcher, P., « The vertebrate fauna from the Natufian level at Jebel es-Saaïde (Saaïde II), Lebanon », Paléorient, 20/2, p. 35-58, 1994,
