= Richard S. Brown =

American judge (born 1946)

Chief Judge of the Wisconsin Court of Appeals
- In office August 1, 2007 – July 31, 2015
- Preceded by: Thomas Cane
- Succeeded by: Lisa Neubauer

Judge of the Wisconsin Court of Appeals for the 2nd district
- In office August 1, 1978 – July 31, 2015
- Preceded by: Position established
- Succeeded by: Brian Hagedorn

Personal details
- Born: March 31, 1946 (age 80) Racine, Wisconsin, U.S.
- Spouse: Nancy Lynn Cory (m. 1969)
- Children: 4
- Parent: Manny S. Brown (father)
- Education: Miami University; University of Wisconsin Law School
- Profession: Lawyer, judge

Richard Searle Brown (born March 31, 1946) is an American jurist and the retired chief judge of the Wisconsin Court of Appeals. Brown served as a Court of Appeals judge from 1978 to 2015 and as chief judge from 2007; his service on the court concluded on July 31, 2015. His father, Manny S. Brown, served four terms in the Wisconsin State Assembly.

== Life and career ==
Richard Brown was born in Racine, Wisconsin; he graduated from Miami University in 1968 and the University of Wisconsin Law School in 1971. He served as an assistant district attorney in Racine County from 1971 until 1973, when he entered private practice in Oshkosh, Wisconsin, specializing in commercial litigation. In 1978, Brown was elected to a judgeship on the newly created Wisconsin Court of Appeals, serving in the court's Waukesha-based District II. At the time of his election, Brown was the youngest judge serving in Wisconsin's courts. In 1983, Brown was appointed presiding judge of District II. Also in 1983, Brown, who is hearing-impaired, became the first judge to use a real-time, computerized transcription system in a Wisconsin courtroom.

In 1990, Brown challenged Wisconsin Supreme Court Justice Donald Steinmetz, a conservative incumbent, in his reelection bid. After a contentious campaign, Brown was defeated in the April general election, despite receiving considerable support and the endorsement of the Milwaukee Journal. Brown continued to serve on the Court of Appeals; in May 2007, he was named the court's chief judge and assumed that office on August 1.

On February 2, 2015, Brown announced his retirement from the Court of Appeals, effective August 2.

== Personal life and family ==
Richard Brown is a son of Manny S. Brown and his wife Jeanne (née Levin). Manny Brown was an attorney in Racine and served four terms in the Wisconsin State Assembly in the 1960s.

Richard Brown married Nancy Lynn Cory in August 1969. They have four adult children.

== See also ==
- List of first minority male lawyers and judges in Wisconsin

Legal offices
New court established	Judge of the Wisconsin Court of Appeals for the 2nd district August 1, 1978 – August 2, 2015	Succeeded by Brian Hagedorn
Preceded by Thomas Cane	Chief Judge of the Wisconsin Court of Appeals; August 1, 2007 – August 2, 2015	Succeeded by Lisa Neubauer
