= Paul Lundsten =

American judge, Wisconsin Court of Appeals

The Honorable Paul Lundsten

Presiding Judge of the Wisconsin Court of Appeals District IV
- In office August 1, 2017 – July 31, 2019
- Preceded by: JoAnne Kloppenburg
- Succeeded by: Michael Fitzpatrick
- In office August 1, 2011 – July 31, 2013
- Preceded by: Margaret J. Vergeront
- Succeeded by: Brian W. Blanchard
- In office August 1, 2005 – July 31, 2007
- Preceded by: David G. Deininger
- Succeeded by: Paul B. Higginbotham

Judge of the Wisconsin Court of Appeals District IV
- In office October 31, 2000 – July 31, 2019
- Appointed by: Tommy Thompson
- Preceded by: William Eich
- Succeeded by: Jennifer E. Nashold

Personal details
- Born: August 11, 1955 (age 70) La Crosse, Wisconsin, U.S.
- Children: 3
- Education: University of Wisconsin–Madison (B.A., J.D.)

Paul Lundsten is an American lawyer and retired judge. He served as a state Assistant Attorney General and as a judge on the Wisconsin Court of Appeals for the Madison-based District IV court serving 24 counties.

== Early life and career ==
Lundsten was born on August 11, 1955, in La Crosse, Wisconsin. He earned his bachelor's degree in accounting from the University of Wisconsin–Madison in 1980, and went on to obtain his J.D. from the University of Wisconsin Law School graduating with honors in 1983.

The same year he graduated from law school, Lundsten was hired by Bronson La Follette, then Wisconsin's Attorney General, to serve as an Assistant Attorney General in the Wisconsin Department of Justice. Lundsten would continue to work as an assistant attorney general until his appointment to the Court of Appeals in 2000, serving under two more attorneys general: Don Hanaway and Jim Doyle. At the Department of Justice, he was initially assigned to the Medicaid Fraud Control Unit. Over his 17 years at the department, he worked on various fraud investigations and consumer protection cases, becoming a specialist in handling criminal cases before state and federal appellate courts, including 25 cases he argued before the State Supreme Court.

== Judicial career ==
On October 31, 2000, Governor Tommy Thompson appointed Lundsten to the Wisconsin Court of Appeals to replace retiring Judge William Eich. Judge Lundsten was elected to a full term in 2001, defeating attorney Charlie Schutze, and was subsequently re-elected without opposition in 2007 and 2013.

In his contested 2001 race, he was endorsed by a broad coalition of Republicans and Democrats, including then Republican Governor Tommy Thompson and then Democratic State Attorney General Jim Doyle.

In 2019 he announced he would not seek a fourth term. He retired from the court July 31, 2019.

== Personal life and family ==
Lundsten is married with three children. Lundsten has completed several marathons and has qualified for the Boston Marathon, running that race in 1996.

== Electoral history ==
Wisconsin Court of Appeals District IV Election, 2001
Party	Candidate	Votes	%	±%
General Election, April 3, 2001
Nonpartisan	Paul Lundsten (incumbent)	112,009	60.53%	
Nonpartisan	Charlie Schutze	72,637	39.26%	
	Scattering	392	0.21%	
Plurality		39,372	21.28%	
Total votes		185,038	100.0%	+13.43%

Legal offices
Preceded by William Eich	Judge of the Wisconsin Court of Appeals District IV; October 31, 2000 – July 31, 2019	Succeeded by Jennifer E. Nashold
