= Harry G. Snyder =

American judge (1938–2023)

The Honorable Harry Snyder

Judge of the Wisconsin Court of Appeals District II
- In office October 1, 1991 – July 31, 2010
- Appointed by: Tommy Thompson
- Preceded by: Burton A. Scott
- Succeeded by: Paul F. Reilly

Wisconsin Circuit Court Judge for the Waukesha Circuit, Branch 1
- In office December 8, 1980 – October 1, 1991
- Appointed by: Lee S. Dreyfus
- Preceded by: Max Raskin (Acting); William E. Gramling (Disabled)
- Succeeded by: Joseph Wimmer

Member of the Wisconsin State Assembly from the 84th district
- In office January 1, 1975 – December 8, 1980
- Preceded by: John M. Alberts
- Succeeded by: John M. Alberts

Personal details
- Born: February 11, 1938 Davenport, Iowa, U.S.
- Died: February 23, 2023 (aged 85) Oconomowoc, Wisconsin, U.S.
- Party: Republican
- Children: 3
- Education: University of Wisconsin (B.S.); Marquette Law School (J.D.)
- Profession: lawyer, judge

Military service
- Allegiance: United States
- Branch/service: United States Air Force
- Years of service: 1964–1967

Harry G. Snyder (February 11, 1938 – February 23, 2023) was an American lawyer, judge, and Republican politician from Waukesha County, Wisconsin. He served on the Wisconsin Court of Appeals in the Waukesha-based 2nd Appellate district from 1991 until his retirement in 2010. Earlier in his career, he served six years in the Wisconsin State Assembly and eleven years as a Wisconsin circuit court judge in Waukesha County.

== Biography ==
Snyder was born on February 11, 1938, in Davenport, Iowa. He graduated from Oconomowoc High School in Oconomowoc, Wisconsin, and attended Ripon College, the University of Wisconsin-Madison and Marquette University Law School.

== Career ==
Snyder served in the Judge Advocate General's Corps as an officer in the United States Air Force and Air Force Reserve. During this time, he was named a NATO Trial Observer by the United States Ambassador to Turkey while stationed at Incirlik Air Base. After returning to the United States, Snyder served as Assistant District Attorney of Waukesha County from 1968 to 1969. He was elected to the Assembly in 1974 and re-elected in 1976, 1978, and 1980. He resigned from the Assembly a month after winning re-election in 1980 to accept appointment to the Wisconsin Circuit Court from Governor Lee S. Dreyfus. He remained on the Circuit Court until his appointment to the Court of Appeals in 1991. Judge Snyder retired in 2010. Snyder died on February 23, 2023, at the age of 85.

Wisconsin State Assembly
| Preceded by John M. Alberts | Member of the Wisconsin State Assembly from the 84th district January 1, 1975 – December 8, 1980 | Succeeded by John M. Alberts |
Legal offices
| Preceded by Max Raskin (Acting); William E. Gramling (Disabled) | Wisconsin Circuit Court Judge for the Waukesha Circuit, Branch 1; 1980 – 1991 | Succeeded by Joseph Wimmer |
| Preceded by Burton A. Scott | Judge of the Wisconsin Court of Appeals District I 1991 – 2010 | Succeeded by Paul F. Reilly |
