= Jennifer E. Nashold =

American judge, Wisconsin Court of Appeals

The Honorable Jennifer Nashold

Judge of the Wisconsin Court of Appeals District IV
- Incumbent
- Assumed office August 1, 2019
- Preceded by: Paul Lundsten

Personal details
- Born: Jennifer Elise Nashold Madison, Wisconsin, U.S.
- Education: University of Wisconsin–Madison (B.A.); University of Wisconsin Law School (J.D.)

Jennifer Elise Nashold is an American attorney, currently serving as a judge of the Wisconsin Court of Appeals. She was elected in 2019.

== Early life and career ==
Nashold was born in Madison, Wisconsin. She received her Bachelor of Arts from the University of Wisconsin-Madison in 1988 and her Juris Doctor from the University of Wisconsin Law School in 1993.

After graduating law school, Nashold has spent her entire legal career in public service. She served as a law clerk for Justice Miriam Shearing of the Supreme Court of Nevada and then–Judge Jesse Walters of the Idaho Court of Appeals. From 1996 to 1997, she served as a Deputy Prosecuting Attorney for Ada County, Idaho.

== Wisconsin offices ==
In 1998, Nashold was hired as an Assistant Attorney General in the Wisconsin Department of Justice, working under future Governor Jim Doyle. Over the next six years, she handled many of the Wisconsin Department of Justice's cases and filings before the Wisconsin Supreme Court. In 2004, she was appointed member and chair of the Wisconsin Tax Appeals Commission by Governor Doyle, serving a three-year term. In 2007, she was appointed General Counsel of the Public Service Commission of Wisconsin, and, in 2010, was made Chief Legal Counsel to the Wisconsin Department of Children and Families. In 2011, she was hired as an Administrative Law Judge in the Wisconsin Department of Administration, Division of Hearings and Appeals, where she served until her election to the Court of Appeals.

=== Legislator misconduct cases (2002–2003) ===
In 2001, a Wisconsin State Journal report uncovered a significant number of cases of Wisconsin legislators making illegal use of their state offices and resources for political purposes. The report prompted investigations by several Wisconsin district attorneys, who indicted several legislators and staffers for activities related to the report, including Brian Burke (D-Milwaukee), Charles Chvala (D-Madison), Scott Jensen (R-Waukesha), Steven Foti (R-Oconomowoc), and Republican staffer and fundraiser Sherry Schultz. Nashold, then working as an Assistant Attorney General, was assigned to coordinate the Wisconsin Department of Justice filings in relation to the ongoing cases.

Brian Burke claimed legislative immunity from prosecution due to his status as a legislator during an ongoing session of the state legislature. Nashold successfully argued to the Wisconsin Supreme Court that they should not take up his case, stating that his immunity claims were not supported by a fair reading of the state constitution.

Nashold also handled filings related to Chvala, Jensen, Foti, and Schultz, who attempted to get several of their charges dismissed by the Appeals Court prior to the case being heard in the circuit court.

=== Police misconduct prosecution (2004) ===
In 2004, Nashold was assigned to serve as special prosecutor for the case of Whitehall, Wisconsin, police officer Daniel J. Wineski, who had been accused of misconduct and abusing his office. Nashold's investigation led to Wineski's indictment on six charges, including sexual assault of a child, intimidation of a victim, false imprisonment, and misconduct in office. Later that year, Wineski pled guilty to reduced charges of third degree sexual assault and misconduct in office, but additional accusers continued to come forward after his guilty plea revealing a twenty-year pattern of misconduct.

== Judicial career ==
During the 8 years when Jim Doyle served as Governor, Nashold was considered at least three times for appointments to various circuit and appeals judgeships when vacancies arose, but ultimately was not selected.

In the 2019 election, Nashold was the lone candidate for Judge of the Wisconsin Court of Appeals in the Madison-based District IV. She was elected to office April 2, 2019, replacing retiring judge Paul Lundsten, who had served nearly 20 years on the court.

=== 2019–2020 Voter purge ===
In her first few months on the court, Judge Nashold heard the case State of Wisconsin ex rel. Timothy Zignego v. Wisconsin Elections Commission. The case arose from an effort on the part of the conservative Wisconsin Institute for Law and Liberty to bring suit against the Wisconsin Elections Commission in an attempt to force a purge of roughly 234,000 registered voters in Wisconsin—which would have been the biggest purge of voters in state history. The plaintiffs in the case were Timothy Zignego, a conservative businessman and Republican donor, David W. Opitz, a former Republican state legislator, and Frederick G. Luehrs III. The complaint alleged that, according to a 2015 law, voter officials were required to purge any voter who did not respond within 30 days to a notice requesting an update to their voter registration. The targeted voters were identified with the assistance of a national voter database Electronic Registration Information Center, which took the place of the Interstate Voter Registration Crosscheck Program, which had been shut down in large part due to its contributions to several massive erroneous purges of voters. A previous attempt to purge Wisconsin voters who were identified as having "moved" based on data from the Electronic Registration Information Center resulted in a large number of inaccurate voter deactivations, causing significant voter difficulties in the 2018 Wisconsin elections.

At the Wisconsin Circuit Court in Ozaukee County, the Republican plaintiffs prevailed and obtained an order from Judge Paul V. Malloy to compel the Elections Commission to act within 30 days. The decision received international attention, with Governor of Wisconsin Tony Evers, Speaker of the United States House of Representatives Nancy Pelosi, and former United States Attorney General Eric Holder among officials calling the order irresponsible, undemocratic, and racially targeted.

The ruling was referred to the Court of Appeals by Wisconsin Attorney General Josh Kaul, along with appeals by the League of Women Voters and individual elections commissioners who were targeted with contempt citations for failing to enforce the order on its original 30 day deadline. After an initial stay of the Circuit Court opinion, Judge Nashold ruled in a panel with judges JoAnne Kloppenburg and Michael R. Fitzpatrick in favor of the Elections Commission, putting a halt to the voter purge. Their decision pointed to the plain language of the statute which was the basis for the complaint, which did not place any requirement on the Elections Commission to act in the manner previously ordered. As a result, the mandamus order, which requires "clear, specific legal right which is free from substantial doubt," was rejected and the contempt citations were reversed.

The decision remains in effect, as a challenge to the Wisconsin Supreme Court initially resulted in a deadlocked 3-3 decision. However, the court may take up the case again after the 2020 Wisconsin elections.

Legal offices
Preceded by Paul Lundsten	Judge of the Wisconsin Court of Appeals District IV; August 1, 2019 – present	Incumbent
