= W. Patrick Donlin =

20th century American judge

The Honorbale W. Patrick Donlin

Judge of the Wisconsin Court of Appeals District III
- In office August 1, 1978 – May 1, 1981
- Preceded by: Position established
- Succeeded by: Thomas Cane

Wisconsin Circuit Court Judge for the 15th Circuit
- In office August 30, 1976 – July 31, 1978
- Preceded by: Lewis J. Charles
- Succeeded by: Position abolished

County Judge of Price County, Wisconsin
- In office January 1, 1974 – August 30, 1976
- Preceded by: Carl E. Bjork
- Succeeded by: David A. Clapp

District Attorney of Price County, Wisconsin
- In office January 1, 1971 – January 1, 1974
- Preceded by: Paul Gehring
- Succeeded by: David Deda

Personal details
- Born: May 12, 1937 Madison, Wisconsin
- Died: February 3, 1996 (aged 58) North Haven, Connecticut
- Resting place: Belleville Cemetery; Belleville, Wisconsin
- Party: Democratic
- Spouse: Nancy M. Fischl (m. 1958; died 2018)
- Children: Teresa M. Donlin; Patricia L. Donlin; William M. Donlin; Timothy P. Donlin
- Education: Saint Mary's College; University of Wisconsin Law School
- Awards: Knight of the Order of St. Gregory the Great

W. Patrick Donlin (May 12, 1937 – February 3, 1996) was an American lawyer and judge. He was one of the first judges of the Wisconsin Court of Appeals, serving from 1978 to 1981, and, before that, was a county and circuit judge in Price County, Wisconsin. He left the judiciary in 1981 to become supreme advocate (general counsel) of the Knights of Columbus, a title he held until his death.

== Early life and career ==
Born in Madison, Wisconsin, he attended Saint Mary's College in Winona, Minnesota, and then the University of Wisconsin Law School, where he received his Bachelor of Science and Bachelor of Laws degrees in 1961. He worked for several years as a lawyer in private practice until his election as district attorney of Price County in 1970, when he defeated incumbent Republican district attorney Paul Gehring. He served one full term and was re-elected in 1972, but left office in January 1974 after being elected County Judge.

== Judicial career ==
In 1976, he was appointed Wisconsin Circuit Court Judge for the 15th circuit by Governor Patrick Lucey following the resignation of Judge Lewis J. Charles, who had reached Wisconsin's mandatory retirement age for judges—70 at the time. Less than two years later, following the Wisconsin courts reorganization authorized by the constitutional amendments of 1977, Judge Donlin ran for the newly created position of judge of the Wisconsin Court of Appeals. In the April 1978 general election, he defeated Brown County Judge James W. Byers. Despite having won a six-year term, Judge Donlin resigned in the middle of his third year on the court in order to go work as assistant supreme advocate for the Knights of Columbus—he was appointed supreme advocate four months later.

== Knights of Columbus ==
Donlin first became a member of the Knights of Columbus at the Father Otto Weber Council 2369, Park Falls, Wisconsin, in 1965, and served two terms as grand knight of that order. He was an active member of the Catholic fraternal organization for the remainder of his life, and, from the time of his judicial resignation, worked as a national officer of the organization.

As supreme advocate—the equivalent of general counsel—Judge Donlin headed up the legal department at the Connecticut headquarters of the Knights of Columbus, managing legal affairs throughout the United States, Canada, Mexico, the Philippines, and Latin America. In 1985, he was appointed a knight of the Order of St. Gregory the Great by Pope John Paul II. As a representative of the Knights of Columbus, he was active in the affairs of the National Fraternal Congress of America, and was elected its president in 1990.

He worked for the organization until his death in 1996, at age 58.

== Personal life and family ==
Judge Donlin was married to Nancy M. Fischl in 1958. They had two sons and two daughters.

== Electoral history ==
Wisconsin Court of Appeals, District III Election, 1978
| Party | Candidate | Votes | % | ±% |
|---|---|---|---|---|
General Election, April 4, 1978
| Nonpartisan | W. Patrick Donlin | 93,253 | 52.77% | |
| Nonpartisan | James W. Byers | 83,458 | 47.23% | |
| Plurality | | 9,795 | 5.54% | |
| Total votes | | 176,711 | 100.0% | |

Legal offices
| New court | Judge of the Wisconsin Court of Appeals District III; August 1, 1978 – May 1, 1981 | Succeeded by Thomas Cane |
