= Manny S. Brown =

20th century American politician

Member of the Wisconsin State Assembly from the Racine 2nd district
- In office January 4, 1965 – January 1, 1973
- Preceded by: Roy E. Naleid
- Succeeded by: District abolished

Personal details
- Born: November 2, 1917 Chicago, Illinois, U.S.
- Died: April 11, 1987 (aged 69) Racine, Wisconsin, U.S.
- Resting place: Racine Jewish Memorial Cemetery
- Spouse: Jeanne Levin (m. 1945–1987)
- Children: Richard S. Brown; Charles Brown
- Education: University of Wisconsin–Madison; Marquette University Law School
- Profession: Lawyer

Military service
- Allegiance: United States
- Branch/service: United States Navy
- Rank: Lieutenant Junior Grade
- Battles/wars: World War II

Manny S. Brown (November 2, 1917 – April 11, 1987) was an American lawyer and Democratic politician from Racine, Wisconsin. He was a member of the Wisconsin State Assembly for eight years, representing Racine County's 2nd Assembly district from 1965 to 1973. He also served 16 years on the Racine school board, and advocated for the creation of the Racine Unified School District. Brown's son, Richard S. Brown, became a long-serving judge of the Wisconsin Court of Appeals and was chief judge from 2007 to 2015.

== Biography ==
Brown was born on November 2, 1917, in Chicago, Illinois. As a child, he moved with his parents to Racine, Wisconsin, and graduated from Racine's Washington Park High School. He went on to earn his bachelor's degree from the University of Wisconsin–Madison and obtained his law degree from Marquette University Law School.

During World War II, he served in the United States Navy.

Brown was elected to the Wisconsin State Assembly in 1964, running on the Democratic Party ticket. He was re-elected in 1966, 1968, and 1970.

He suffered a severe heart attack in February 1972. He was hospitalized at Madison's University Hospital for several weeks and subsequently announced that he would not run for re-election.

After announcing he would leave office, he accepted a part-time job on the staff of the Racine County district attorney, where he worked under his son Richard S. Brown, then an assistant district attorney.

== Personal life and family ==
Manny Brown was one of two sons born to Sol and Mona (née Streicher) Brown. Mona Brown was a Ukrainian American immigrant. The Browns were Jewish and members of the Beth Israel Sinai Temple in Racine.

Manny Brown married Jeanne Levin at Beth Israel Sinai Temple in 1945. They had two sons and were married for 42 years before his death in 1987. Their son Richard S. Brown went on to serve 37 years as a judge of the Wisconsin Court of Appeals and was chief judge from 2007 to 2015.

Manny Brown died April 11, 1987, at St. Luke's Hospital in Racine after suffering a heart attack.
