= Kenosha unrest shooting =

Shooting in Wisconsin, United States

- Part of the Kenosha unrest
- Rittenhouse, prior to the shootings, with his rifle and a first aid kit
- Date: August 25, 2020; 6 years ago
- Time: 11:48–11:59 p.m. (CDT)
- Location: Kenosha, Wisconsin, U.S.; 42°34′49″N 87°49′17″W
- Type: Double-homicide (Note: The term "homicide" does not imply any culpability.) by shooting
- Deaths: 2
- Injuries: 1
- Accused: Kyle Howard Rittenhouse
- Charges: First degree intentional homicide; First degree reckless homicide; Attempted first degree intentional homicide; First degree recklessly endangering safety (2 counts); Possession of a dangerous weapon by a person under 18 (dismissed by trial judge); Failure to comply with an emergency order from state or local government (dismissed by trial judge)
- Verdict: Acquitted
- Litigation: Wrongful death lawsuit by one of the deceased's father against Rittenhouse and others

On August 25, 2020, Kyle Rittenhouse, a 17-year-old from Antioch, Illinois, shot and killed two men and wounded another man in Kenosha, Wisconsin. The shootings occurred during the protests, riots, and civil unrest that followed the shooting of Jacob Blake. Race was a major theme in U.S. media commentary of the event, although Rittenhouse and those he shot were white. Rittenhouse was armed with an AR-15–style rifle and had joined a group of armed people in Kenosha who said that they were in Kenosha to protect businesses.

Joseph D. Rosenbaum, a 36-year-old unarmed Kenosha man, ran at Rittenhouse and grabbed the barrel of his rifle after throwing a plastic shopping bag of clothing at him. Rittenhouse shot Rosenbaum four times at close range, killing him. A crowd formed and Rittenhouse quickly fled the scene. Anthony Huber, a 26-year-old-resident of Silver Lake, struck Rittenhouse in the head with a skateboard and attempted to wrest his rifle away; Rittenhouse shot him once, fatally. Gaige Paul Grosskreutz, a 26-year-old West Allis man who pointed a handgun at Rittenhouse, was shot by Rittenhouse once in the right arm and survived.

Kenosha County prosecutors charged Rittenhouse with two counts of homicide, one count of attempted homicide, two counts of reckless endangerment, one count of unlawful possession of a firearm, and one count of curfew violation. His trial lasted from November 1 to 19, 2021. Prosecutors sought to show Rittenhouse as a criminal gunman, while defense lawyers argued that Rittenhouse had acted in self-defense, asserting that his attackers were part of a mob that "attacked him in the street like an animal" and that he used force necessary to prevent imminent death or great bodily harm to himself. (Note: In Wisconsin, a defendant asserting perfect self-defense against a charge of first-degree murder must meet an objective threshold showing that the defendant reasonably believed that the defendant was preventing or terminating an unlawful interference with the defendant's person and that the force used was necessary to prevent imminent death or great bodily harm.) Judge Bruce Schroeder dismissed the unlawful possession charge and the curfew violation charge after prosecutors failed to provide sufficient evidence, and a jury found Rittenhouse not guilty of the remaining charges.

Public sentiment of the shootings, as well as media coverage are both polarized and politicized. Multiple right-wing politicians and figures welcomed Rittenhouse's acquittal, stating that the shootings were self-defense. President Joe Biden called for the jury's verdict to be respected, although stated that the verdict "will leave many Americans feeling angry and concerned, myself included." Multiple Democratic politicians and figures criticized the verdict as a miscarriage of justice, saying that the acquittal was emblematic of racial double standards in the American justice system. Gun control advocates expressed concerns that the verdict would embolden vigilantism and militia groups. An Economist/YouGov poll conducted during the trial found that two-thirds of Republicans thought Rittenhouse should be acquitted, while three-quarters of Democrats thought he should be convicted.

== Background ==
On August 23, 2020, civil unrest erupted in Kenosha after the shooting of Jacob Blake, an African-American man who was shot seven times by a Kenosha police officer and became paralyzed from the waist down. Following a resurgence in protests that were part of the Black Lives Matter movement after other high-profile killings of African-Americans by police officers in 2020, the protests in Kenosha included rallies, marches, property damage, arson, and clashes with police between August 23 and September 1.

On August 25, former Kenosha alderman Kevin Mathewson put out a call on the Facebook page of the Kenosha Guard militia group for "patriots willing to take up arms and defend" Kenosha. Mathewson had previously formed the Kenosha Guard in response to the George Floyd protests earlier that year. The event post, titled "Armed Citizens to Protect our Lives and Property," was picked up and redistributed by InfoWars. (Note: Multiple sources:) It received a national and international online response, attracting a larger number of armed men than were present at other protests in Wisconsin that summer. Kenosha Mayor John Antaramian and County Sheriff David Beth expressed their disapproval of armed civilians patrolling the streets, while some Wisconsin police officers were seen in a video giving them water and heard saying, "We appreciate you guys, we really do."

== People involved ==
At the time of the shooting, Kyle Rittenhouse was 17 years old. Kyle's father was living in Kenosha, but Kyle lived with his mother in Antioch, Illinois, a community about 20 driving miles away. Prior to the Kenosha unrest, he had participated in local police cadet programs and expressed support on social media for the Blue Lives Matter movement and law enforcement. Three months prior to the shooting, Rittenhouse's friend, Dominick Black, purchased a semi-automatic, AR-15–style rifle as a favor for him in Wisconsin since Rittenhouse was too young to purchase a gun. Black's stepfather stored the gun in a locked safe at his home in Kenosha but had relocated the weapon to an unsecured area in the basement on August 24, the second day of the Kenosha unrest, for ready access in case of a break-in.

Those killed were Joseph Rosenbaum, aged 36 from Kenosha, and Anthony Huber, aged 26 from Silver Lake. Gaige Grosskreutz, aged 26 from West Allis, was injured. Rosenbaum and Huber both had a history of violence, mental health issues, and had spent time in prison; Rosenbaum had previously been convicted of sexual conduct with children.

== Sequence of events ==
=== Before the shooting ===
After the city suffered building and vehicle damage during protests on August 24, social media had drawn locals and outsiders, left-wing activists and right-wing militia into the city streets despite an evening curfew imposed on citizens. Some 250 National Guard members were deployed to the city.

On August 25, militia that included Boogaloo boys and a biker crew carrying "hatchets, ball bats, and firearms" assembled near two gas stations south of Car Source, an automotive business with three properties (a dealership, a used car lot, and another car lot to the South), which had been badly damaged during the first two nights of unrest. Car Source had suffered $1.5 million in arson damage the previous night.

Peaceful protests during the day were followed by chaos where protestors, armed civilians and others faced off against one another and the police at night. Two hours after the 8:00 pm curfew had begun, police began to drive the protesters south out of Civic Center Park using BearCat armored personnel carriers. The shootings took place shortly before midnight along Sheridan Road.

==== Rittenhouse ====
On August 24, Rittenhouse drove to Kenosha to stay with his friend Dominick Black. The following day, August 25, Rittenhouse helped clean graffiti off a school. Later, Rittenhouse and Black, both armed with rifles, arrived at Car Source. Accounts differ as to whether Rittenhouse and Black's help was requested by Car Source. The dealership owner's sons denied that gunmen had been asked to defend the business, but several witnesses testified that armed individuals had been directly sought out by the business to protect their property.

In the hours leading up to the shooting, Rittenhouse appeared in multiple videos taken by protesters and bystanders and was interviewed twice: first by a livestreamer at the car dealership where he and a number of other armed men had stationed themselves, second by Richie McGinniss, a reporter for The Daily Caller. Rittenhouse was seen talking with police officers, and offering medical aid to those who were injured. When McGinniss asked Rittenhouse why he was at the car dealership, he responded: "People are getting injured and our job is to protect this business, [...] [a]nd part of my job is to also help people. If there is somebody hurt, I'm running into harm's way. That's why I have my rifle – because I can protect myself, obviously. But I also have my med kit."

After 10:00 pm, Rittenhouse alternated between standing guard at the dealership and walking the street offering medical attention. Rittenhouse left Car Source around 11:40 pm and was blocked from returning to the business by the BearCats. Rittenhouse headed to the Car Source lot farthest to the south.

==== Rosenbaum ====
In the hours leading up to the shooting, prosecution witnesses described Rosenbaum as "hyperaggressive and acting out in a violent manner" and "acting very belligerently".

Witnesses described Rosenbaum carrying around a chain, trying to light fires, throwing rocks, and trying to provoke fights with people by "false stepping" at them. One witness described Rosenbaum "very bluntly asking people to shoot him" saying "shoot me, nigga", to which other protesters displayed negative reactions.

Another witness described how, accompanied by Rittenhouse, he tried to calm a disagreement between Rosenbaum and another man when Rosenbaum made threats to kill both of them, saying "if I catch any of you guys alone tonight, I'm going to fucking kill you!". The witness stated that he believed the threat was directed at both himself and Rittenhouse and that Rittenhouse had heard the threat.

=== First confrontation ===
Locations of shootings:
1 Shooting of Joseph Rosenbaum
2 Shooting of Anthony Huber and Gaige Grosskreutz

According to his testimony, Rittenhouse was on patrol along Sheridan Road south of 60th Street with another armed volunteer, Ryan Balch. While patrolling, Rittenhouse lost contact with Balch, and so turned back up Sheridan Road towards the Car Source location at 59th and Sheridan (referred to during the trial as "Car Source 2") where he had been originally posted. However, he was stopped by police stationed at the junction of Sheridan Road and 60th Street, who turned him back, saying they were not allowing anybody to cross north of 60th Street. Rittenhouse then went to the nearby Ultimate Gas Station, believing this to be a safe location.

Rittenhouse testified that he received a call from Dominick Black telling him that the Car Source location at 63rd and Sheridan was being vandalized and that many vehicles had been set on fire and requesting him to go to that location and help put out fires. Rittenhouse then asked another person at the Ultimate Gas Station for a fire extinguisher and to accompany him to the Car Source location at 63rd and Sheridan. This person provided him a fire extinguisher but did not accompany him to the location.

Rittenhouse testified that he then walked and ran towards the Car Source location at 63rd and Sheridan on his own, carrying his rifle, the fire extinguisher and some first aid supplies. As he approached the Car Source lot at 63rd and Sheridan he heard someone shout "Burn in hell!". He responded "Friendly! Friendly! Friendly!" to placate them but could not see who it was.

Rittenhouse testified that when he reached the Car Source lot, he noticed a vehicle with flames in the back seat and approached the vehicle intending to put out the fire. He was then approached from near the vehicle by Joshua Ziminski, who was holding a pistol in his hand. Rittenhouse dropped the fire extinguisher, intending to run away. He then noticed Rosenbaum approaching him on his right, around the side of the vehicle, with a t-shirt wrapped around his face. Rittenhouse testified that he recognized Rosenbaum as the man who had previously threatened him but did not recognize Ziminski. Rittenhouse also testified that he believed Rosenbaum to be unarmed. This interaction was witnessed by McGinniss, who perceived that Rosenbaum and other protesters were moving toward Rittenhouse and that Rittenhouse was trying to evade them.

Rittenhouse testified that he then believed himself to be in danger and ran south-west across the lot, aiming for the safety of the Car Source lot buildings. Rosenbaum chased after him. Rittenhouse testified that he heard Ziminski shout to Rosenbaum "Get him and kill him!", and that he soon perceived his avenue of escape to be blocked by vehicles and a group of protesters, and that Rosenbaum was catching up to him. Video footage showed Rittenhouse being pursued across a parking lot by a group of people. During the chase, Rosenbaum threw a plastic bag containing socks, underwear, and deodorant at Rittenhouse.

Ziminski fired a shot into the air, and was later charged with disorderly conduct using a dangerous weapon. After the shot was fired, Rittenhouse turned around, to see Rosenbaum now only a few feet away from him. According to McGinniss, who was standing near Rittenhouse at the time, Rosenbaum then shouted "fuck you!" and "lunged" at Rittenhouse and grabbed the barrel of his rifle. Rittenhouse then fired four shots at Rosenbaum, killing him. The bullets perforated Rosenbaum's heart, aorta, pulmonary artery and right lung, fractured his pelvis, and caused minor wounds to his left thigh and forehead.

McGinniss, who had been standing 15 feet (4.6 m) away and felt one of the bullets whiz by his leg, checked himself before he began to administer first aid to Rosenbaum and told Rittenhouse to call 911. Rittenhouse stood over McGinniss for half of a minute before fleeing, and was heard saying "I just killed somebody" on his cell phone to his friend Dominick Black as he sprinted out of the parking lot where he had shot Rosenbaum. Rittenhouse then ran down the street towards police vehicles pursued by protesters.

=== Second confrontation ===
Gaige Grosskreutz testified that he was filming the protest as a legal observer for the American Civil Liberties Union on a Facebook livestream. Shortly before midnight, Grosskreutz said he heard gunshots to the south and observed Rittenhouse running in his direction on Sheridan Road. Grosskreutz said he ran alongside Rittenhouse and asked "Hey, what are you doing? You shot somebody?"

Prosecutors said that protesters were heard on two different videos yelling "Beat him up!", "Hey, he shot him!" and "Get him! Get that dude!" One individual struck Rittenhouse, knocking off his cap, shortly after which Rittenhouse tripped and fell to the ground. Others shouted "What'd he do?", "Just shot someone!" and "Get his ass!" While Rittenhouse was on the ground, Maurice Freeland, one of the men in pursuit, jump kicked Rittenhouse, who fired twice but missed Freeland.

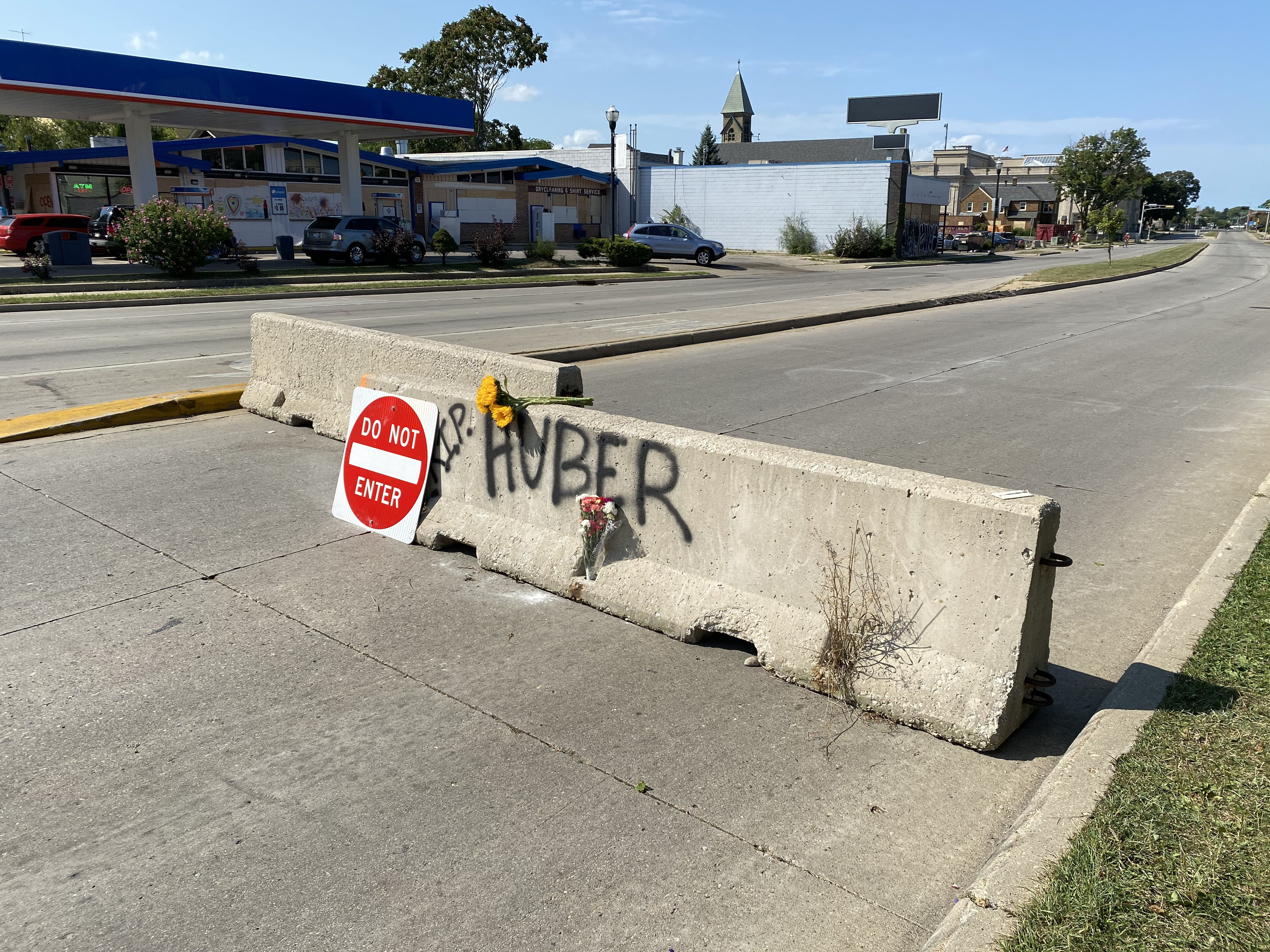
Graffiti and flowers on a roadblock pay tribute to Anthony Huber on the road on which he was killed

Another protester, Anthony Huber, struck Rittenhouse's left shoulder, neck and head with a skateboard as the pair struggled for control of the gun. As Huber was pulling on the rifle, Rittenhouse fired once, hitting Huber in the chest, perforating his heart and right lung, causing his rapid death.

Grosskreutz testified he believed Rittenhouse was an active shooter. Grosskreutz testified that he had an expired concealed carry permit for a handgun and was carrying a Glock pistol. In 2024, local reporting found that Grosskreutz actually had a valid concealed carry permit at the time but had believed contrary information from police and prosecutors.

Grosskreutz approached Rittenhouse, who was on the ground, but stopped and put his hands up after Huber was shot. Grosskreutz then pointed his handgun and advanced on Rittenhouse, who shot Grosskreutz once in the arm, severing most of the biceps of his right arm.

At least 16 gunshots from other sources were heard on video during the time that Rittenhouse was on the ground.

=== After the shooting ===
Rittenhouse got back to his feet and walked towards police with his hands up and the rifle strapped across his chest. Several police officers testified during the trial that they were responding to an active shooter incident and did not recognize that Rittenhouse was the shooter. He was repeatedly told to get out of the road, and when he continued to advance, one officer attempted to pepper-spray him. Several witnesses and protesters had shouted for Rittenhouse to be arrested. When asked at a press conference why Rittenhouse was not stopped, Kenosha Sheriff David Beth said, "In situations that are high-stress, you have such incredible tunnel vision" and implied officers may not have realized he had been involved in the shooting. Likewise, Kenosha Police Chief Daniel Miskinis said that "there was nothing to suggest this individual was involved in any criminal behavior" due to the fact that someone walking towards the police with their hands up was "no longer abnormal" in the wake of the protests.

In the minutes that followed, dozens of more shots echoed in the area as the crowds rapidly dispersed amid fear of a mass shooting-active shooter event. But no further injuries were reported and it was never determined who was shooting.

Video clips of the shootings and aftermath immediately went viral. After hundreds of complaints relating to solicitations from militia groups that led to the increased presence of armed counter-demonstrators, the Facebook platform removed the Kenosha Guard's post by August 26 and classified the event as a mass shooting.

On August 29, the legal team for Rittenhouse released a statement asserting that Rittenhouse acted in self-defense and was wrongly arrested. President Donald Trump visited Kenosha on September 1. On September 22, Rittenhouse's defense team released an 11-minute narrated video of the night, consisting of quick cuts between various angles. The video contended that several shots were fired before and after the shooting of Rosenbaum, and that Rosenbaum may have started chasing Rittenhouse because he mistook him for a man with whom he had a dispute earlier.

=== Detention and release ===
Rittenhouse returned to his hometown of Antioch, Illinois, and turned himself in to police about an hour after the shootings in Kenosha and was held in a juvenile facility in Illinois until he was extradited to Wisconsin on October 30, 2020. He was released from detention on November 20, after posting $2 million bail raised through crowdfunding.

On January 22, 2021, the conditions of Rittenhouse's release were changed so that he could not consume alcohol, have access to firearms, or associate with persons or groups known to be a threat to others based on race or religion. These changes were made after Rittenhouse was seen on January 5 at a bar with his mother in Mt. Pleasant, Wisconsin, drinking beers and posing for pictures alongside five men who sang "Proud of Your Boy", a song used by members of the far-right Proud Boys political organization. In one photo with two of them, Rittenhouse flashed an "OK" sign, a hand gesture that some have associated with white supremacists. (Note: For more information, see OK gesture § White power symbol)

On February 11, judge Bruce Schroeder denied a request by prosecutors for a $200,000 increase in Rittenhouse's bond, after Rittenhouse failed to file an address change within 48 hours of moving, stating that people out on bail often fail to update their address. Rittenhouse's attorney said that Rittenhouse had been staying at an undisclosed address out of concern for his safety.

== Rittenhouse criminal trial ==
Rittenhouse's trial began on November 1, 2021, and concluded on November 19 in the Kenosha County Circuit Court. Rittenhouse was represented by attorneys Mark Richards, Corey Chirafisi, and Natalie Wisco; the State was represented by ADAs Thomas Binger and James Kraus. The presiding judge was Bruce E. Schroeder. Jury selection on November 1 resulted in a 20-person panel of 12 jurors and eight alternates. The jury heard testimony from over 30 witnesses and viewed more than a dozen videos taken on the night of the shooting. During the trial, prosecutors argued that Rittenhouse was seen as an active shooter and had provoked the other participants while defense lawyers argued the affirmative defense of self-defense on the grounds that Rittenhouse had been chased and attacked.

=== Charges ===
Under Wisconsin state law, Rittenhouse was charged as an adult with the following crimes: (Note: Multiple sources:)

- first-degree reckless homicide, punishable by imprisonment of up to 65 years (for killing Joseph Rosenbaum)
- first-degree intentional homicide, punishable by a mandatory life sentence with or without the possibility of extended supervision (for killing Anthony Huber)
- attempted first-degree intentional homicide, punishable by imprisonment of up to 65 years (for shooting and injuring Gaige Grosskreutz)
- first-degree recklessly endangering safety (two counts), punishable by imprisonment of up to 17 years and six months per count, one count for endangering Richard McGinnis and one count firing two shots that missed Maurice Freeland who jump kicked Rittenhouse
- possession of a dangerous weapon by a person under 18, punishable by imprisonment of up to nine months (dismissed when the judge ruled that the age limit in connection with carrying a rifle was 16, not 18)
- failure to comply with an emergency order from state or local government, punishable by a fine of up to $200 (for breaking the 8 p.m. Kenosha curfew, dismissed)

Each felony charge's maximum imprisonment included a "use of a dangerous weapon" modifier, which invokes a Wisconsin law that prescribes an addition of no more than five years of imprisonment. The rifle used in the shootings was identified as a Smith & Wesson M&P15 chambered in .223/5.56×45. Black bought the rifle on May 1, with money from Rittenhouse, and gave it to him hours before the shootings.

Rittenhouse pleaded not guilty to all charges on January 5, 2021.

=== Pretrial rulings ===
At a hearing on September 17, 2021, Schroeder denied prosecutors' requests to admit Rittenhouse's meeting with Proud Boys members and a previous fight that he was involved in as evidence in the case, finding that the incidents were "too dissimilar" to the shooting. Schroeder also denied the defense's request to admit evidence of Rosenbaum's prior criminal record as a sex offender. On October 25, Schroeder defined what testimony would or would not be admissible by both the defense and the prosecution. Schroeder ordered that the men shot by Rittenhouse could not be referred to as victims, but determined they could be described as arsonists or looters if the defense was able to establish evidence that Rosenbaum, Huber, or Grosskreutz were engaged in those activities that night. Legal experts stated that saying the term "victim" can appear prejudicial in a court of law, which would heavily influence a jury by presupposing who is innocent and guilty.

=== Arguments and testimonies ===
Trial arguments and testimonies took place between November 2 and 15, 2021, in Kenosha County Courthouse. After opening arguments, jurors were shown multiple video recordings of the events. Video footage recorded shortly before the shooting showed Rosenbaum shouting "Shoot me, nigger" at an armed man who pointed a gun at him. Two witnesses testified having seen Rosenbaum yelling and behaving violently before approaching Rittenhouse and trying to take his rifle. A former marine testified that Rosenbaum had taunted him and other armed men before the shootings but said he did not consider Rosenbaum a threat. A witness who had spoken with Rittenhouse after the shooting recalled a nervous, pale, and sweating Rittenhouse as repeatedly saying "I just shot someone." The prosecution questioned why Rittenhouse would feel threatened while holding a rifle, and described him as an armed threat.

On November 8, Grosskreutz, an armed volunteer medic, testified that he "thought the defendant was an active shooter" and said "I thought I was going to die." Grosskreutz, whom videos show putting his hands in the air when standing a few feet from Rittenhouse, testified that he then saw Rittenhouse re-rack his rifle, while Rittenhouse testified that he was examining his rifle at that point. Grosskreutz said that "meant that the defendant pulled the trigger while my hands were in the air, but the gun didn't fire, so by reracking the weapon I inferred the defendant wasn't accepting my surrender." Grosskreutz testified that he decided to "close the distance" to Rittenhouse, to employ "non-lethal" methods of either wrestling the gun away from or detaining Rittenhouse. He further testified that he sought to preserve his own life but was "never trying to kill" Rittenhouse, and that as he moved closer to Rittenhouse, unintentionally pointing his handgun at him, Rittenhouse shot him.

On November 10, prosecution witness Ryan Balch, a military veteran who also carried an AR-style rifle that night, recalled Rosenbaum shouting "If I catch any of you guys alone tonight I'm going to fucking kill you!" Rittenhouse took the stand and testified that Rosenbaum threatened to kill him twice and ambushed him before the fatal shooting. Rittenhouse broke down on recounting those events, and the judge ordered a recess. Afterward, Rittenhouse said that Rosenbaum charged at him, putting his hand on Rittenhouse's gun barrel. In cross-examination, Rittenhouse acknowledged using deadly force to stop the attack on him, while also saying that killing was not his intent.

Judge Schroeder ruled on November 12 that the jury could consider whether or not Rittenhouse provoked the attacks that unfolded.

The defense made several requests for a mistrial that included a motion for a mistrial with prejudice using the argument that there was "prosecutorial overreaching" and that the state acted "in bad faith". The defense later requested a mistrial without prejudice due to a dispute over drone video used in the trial. Defense attorneys stated that the version provided to them by the prosecution was in a lower resolution and different aspect ratio than the version presented by the state, in violation of rules of evidence and the right of defendants to confront their accuser. The judge, who sparred with prosecutor Thomas Binger on several occasions, had accused Binger of a violation of the right to silence guaranteed by the Fifth Amendment after Binger alleged Rittenhouse deliberately refrained from commenting on the case in order to fit his testimony in response to witnesses' accounts once at trial. Binger's mention of video footage showing Rittenhouse expressing a willingness to shoot suspected shoplifters angered Schroeder, who had ruled the material was neither related nor allowed at trial.

==== MSNBC Court Ban ====
On November 18, Schroeder banned MSNBC and its affiliates from the courthouse for the remainder of the trial after Kenosha police observed that a car driven by an MSNBC producer had followed the jury bus and ran a red light. The driver, detained on suspicion of photographing jurors, was issued traffic citations and released by police after they failed to find pictures of jurors. NBC News denied their affiliated driver had intended to photograph or contact jurors during deliberations.

=== Acquittal ===
After the prosecution rested its case, the judge dismissed a charge of curfew violation against Rittenhouse, citing a lack of evidence offered by the prosecution; the charge of unlawful possession of a firearm was also dismissed, based on the defense argument that the Wisconsin law restricts minors from carrying rifles only if they are short-barreled. The barrel of Rittenhouse's rifle was longer than 16 inches, the shortest barrel length allowed for minors under state law.

The jury reached a unanimous verdict on all other charges after more than 25 hours of deliberations spanning four days, finding Rittenhouse not guilty on all counts.

== Other litigation ==
=== Criminal charges ===
Black was charged with two felony counts of intentionally giving a dangerous weapon to a minor, resulting in death, for supplying Rittenhouse with the rifle used to kill Rosenbaum and Huber. Bond was set at $2500. Black pleaded not guilty to the charges. In January 2022, as part of a plea deal in which prosecutors agreed to drop the two felony charges, Black pleaded no contest to contributing to the delinquency of a minor.

Ziminski was charged with disorderly conduct-use of a dangerous weapon, obstructing an officer, and arson of property other than a building during the Kenosha unrest. He allegedly fired a shot in the air before Rittenhouse killed Rosenbaum. Ziminski pleaded not guilty to the charges. His trial, scheduled for January 2022, was postponed after he allegedly threatened a witness. In September 2022, while out on bail, Ziminski and his wife Kelly were both charged with several felonies for allegedly attempting to rob a Kenosha man at knifepoint in August. In 2023, the Ziminskis pled guilty to burglary and robbery with threat of force in exchange for dismissal of other charges related to the robbery and in Joshua's case all charges related to the 2020 arrest were also dismissed. In August, Joshua was sentenced to 3 years in prison and Kelly to 20 months in prison.

=== Civil litigation ===
A lawsuit was filed in September 2020 by plaintiffs including the partner of Anthony Huber, seeking damages from Rittenhouse, Facebook, the far-right group Boogaloo Bois, and the Kenosha Guard militia and its commander. The suit alleged negligence on the part of Facebook in allowing the Kenosha Guard to call for militia members on its platform and alleged that the defendants had participated in a conspiracy to violate their civil rights. The suit was withdrawn by the plaintiffs without comment and dismissed with prejudice in the last week of January 2021.

On January 4, 2021, Huber's parents and Gaige Grosskreutz each filed $10 million claim notices, against both the city and county, alleging negligence due to inaction in protecting their rights.

On August 17, 2021, Huber's parents filed a lawsuit in federal court against the Kenosha Police Department and Kenosha County Sheriff's Department, claiming that law enforcement allowed Rittenhouse to harm people peacefully protesting against the police shooting of Jacob Blake. Huber's parents amended their lawsuit in January 2022 to add Rittenhouse as a named defendant. Rittenhouse sought to have the lawsuit dismissed because it was served to his sister rather than him, while the Kenosha government argued the suit "failed to properly allege federal civil rights claims". Judge Lynn Adelman ruled in February 2023 that the suit could proceed.

Grosskreutz filed a federal lawsuit in the Eastern District of Wisconsin on October 14, 2021, alleging that Kenosha law enforcement officials, including the Kenosha Police Department and the Kenosha Sheriff's office, had coordinated with and encouraged the participation of armed militias, depriving protestors of their constitutional right to freedom of speech. Grosskreutz's lawsuit alleges that police enabled the violence by allowing militia to patrol the streets, then funneled protestors toward the armed citizens, telling militia members to take care of the protesters. It seeks economic relief for, "emotional distress, humiliation, loss of enjoyment of life, and other pain and suffering". In February 2023, Grosskreutz's lawsuit was amended to add Rittenhouse as a defendant.

== Responses ==
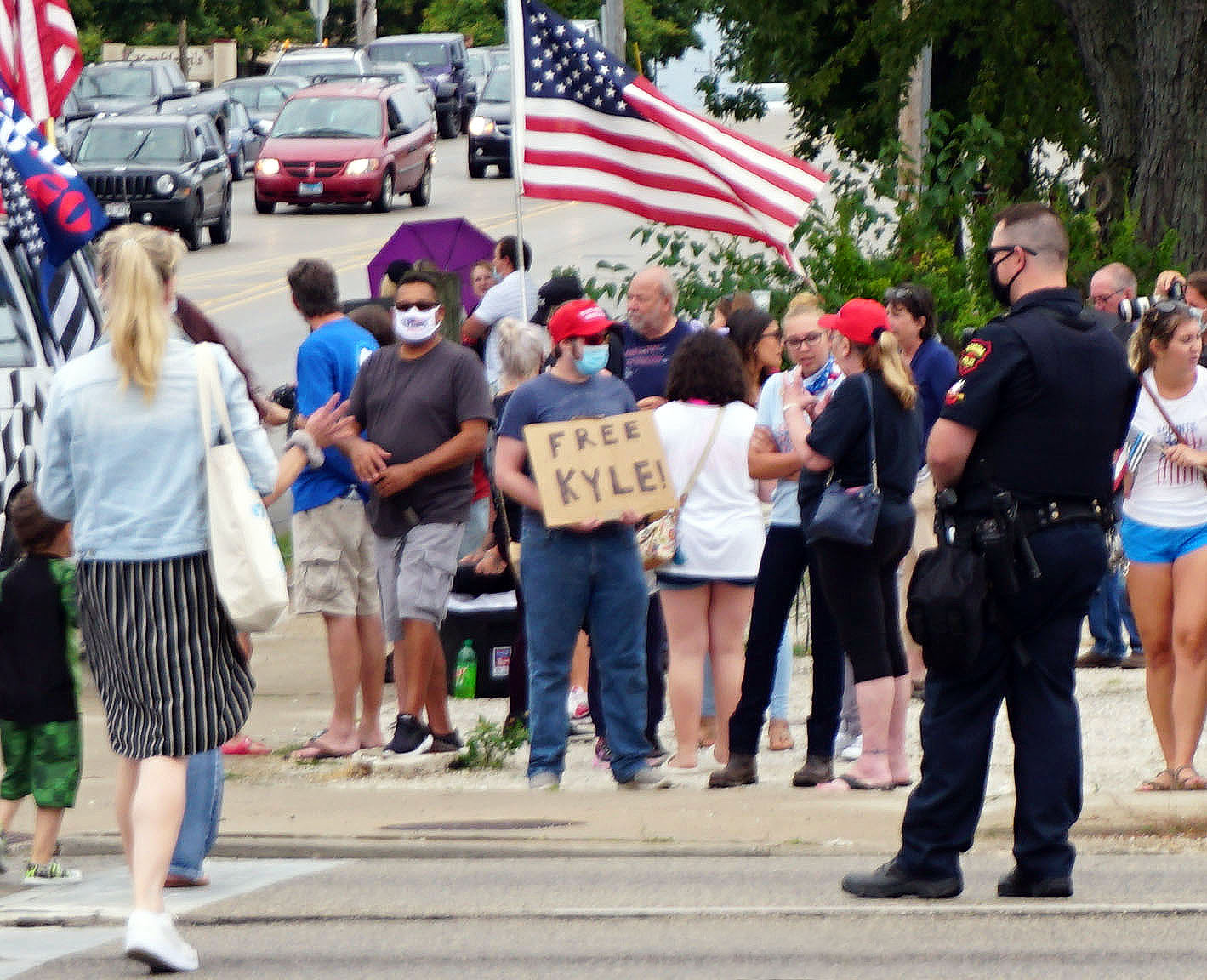
A man holds a "Free Kyle" sign near Bradford High School during President Donald Trump's visit on September 1, 2020.

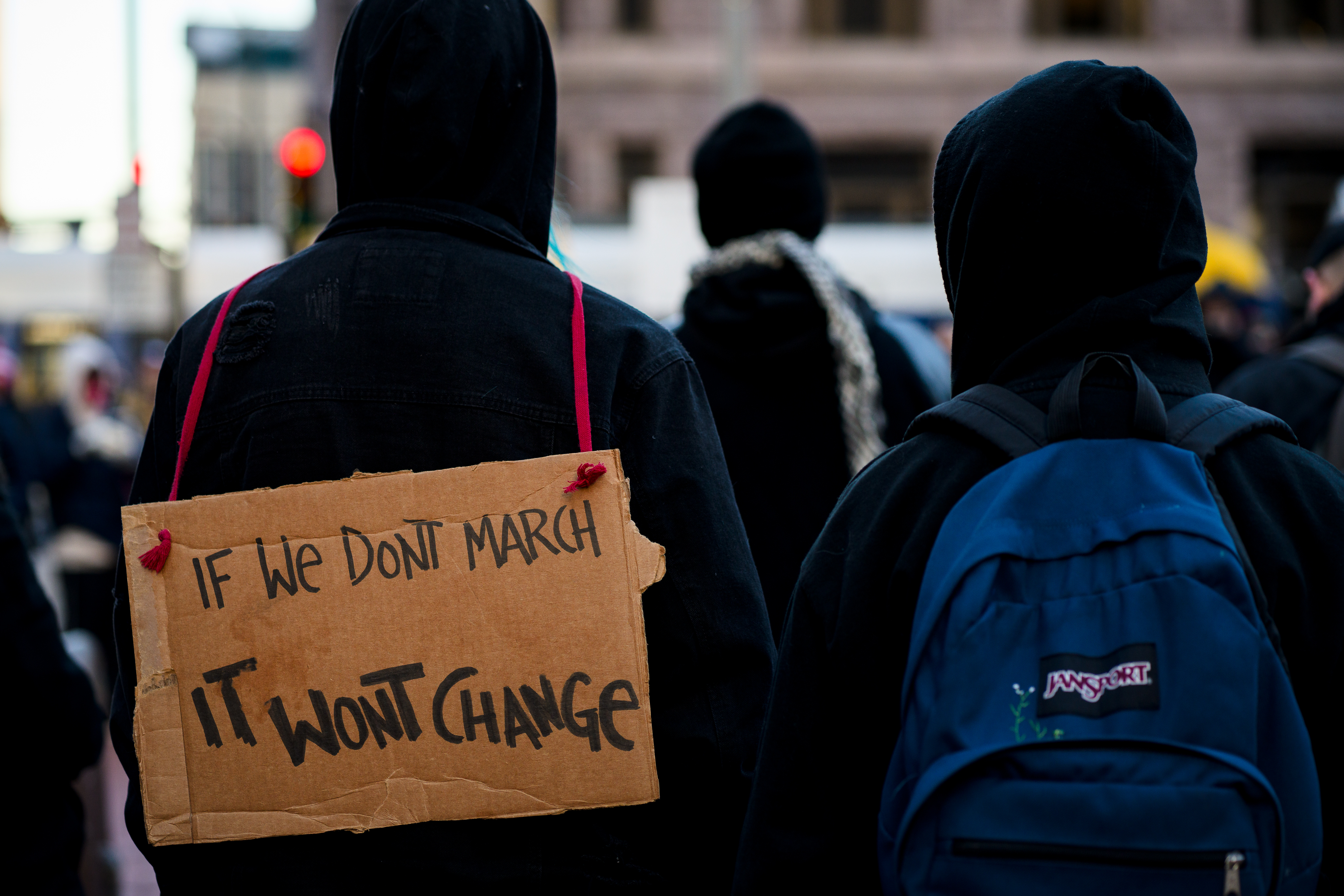
Protest in Minneapolis on November 20, 2021 against the not guilty judgement of Kyle Rittenhouse

Public sentiment regarding the shootings was polarized. Coverage was both critical and supportive of Rittenhouse's actions, and used terms such as "vigilante" and "terrorist", but also "volunteer" and "maintaining peace" to describe him.

Writing for the American Bar Association Journal, Matt Reynolds observed that the "scenes in Wisconsin illustrated a tension between the Second Amendment right to bear arms and the First Amendment right to peacefully protest."

An Economist/YouGov poll conducted with 1,500 adult Americans between November 14–16 found that black Americans overwhelmingly thought Rittenhouse should be found guilty of homicide while white Americans were closely divided.

Snopes tracked Facebook accounts they considered unusual and determined that "foreign-run Facebook accounts celebrated the Rittenhouse verdict." Facebook removed the accounts following the report.

=== Criticism of the police ===
Many commentators were critical of the fact that Rittenhouse was not immediately arrested despite witnesses shouting that he was the shooter. The American Civil Liberties Union (ACLU) called for the resignations of Kenosha Police Chief Daniel Miskinis and of Kenosha Sheriff David Beth. The ACLU statement argued that Beth's deputies fraternized with "white supremacist counter-protesters" during the day of the shooting and did not arrest the shooter. The statement attacked Miskinis for blaming those shot in the course of the shooting when he said that the violence was the result of the "persons" involved violating curfew. The Kenosha mayor stated that he would not ask the sheriff or police chief to resign.

=== Responses by authorities ===
NBC News obtained a Department of Homeland Security internal document and reported that it directed federal law enforcement officials to make specific statements regarding Rittenhouse, such as noting that he "took his rifle to the scene of the rioting to help defend small business owners" and that "[Rittenhouse] is innocent until proven guilty and deserves a fair trial based on all the facts, not just the ones that support a certain narrative."

=== Responses by Internet companies ===
Several internet companies including Facebook, Twitter and GoFundMe restricted content related to Rittenhouse and the shooting. Two days after the shooting, Facebook removed content supporting Rittenhouse, citing rules banning praise or support of mass shooters or glorification of violence. Facebook further disabled searches for "Kyle Rittenhouse", with a spokesperson saying "We've designated this shooting as a mass murder and have removed the shooter's accounts from Facebook and Instagram". Shortly after the trial ended, Facebook lifted their ban. An online merchandise store run by Rittenhouse's family to fundraise for legal expenses was deplatformed twice, once by an unnamed vendor and again by Printify, the latter of whom stated "we don't want to be affiliated with a story that's involved in such a complex, controversial and ongoing case." GoFundMe, who banned the Rittenhouse defense fund because he was accused of a violent crime, lifted their ban after Rittenhouse was acquitted.

=== Politicians ===
==== Republican ====
In public comments six days after the shooting, then-President Donald Trump said it appeared that Rittenhouse was acting in self-defense, saying "He was trying to get away from them, I guess, it looks like," noting the incident was under investigation and "I guess he was in very big trouble. He probably would have been killed." The former president later described the trial as a "witch hunt from the Radical Left", and praised the not guilty verdict from the jury.

Other conservative politicians have also lauded its decision, and Rittenhouse's figure was described as being a cause célèbre for the political right. Ron Johnson, the Republican senator from Wisconsin, said that "justice has been served" with the verdict and called to acknowledge the ruling. Ted Cruz, U.S. senator from Texas, and Chris Christie, former governor of New Jersey, also praised the ruling, with the latter saying that the verdict "renews our faith in the jury system". Three U.S. representatives, Paul Gosar from Arizona, Madison Cawthorn from North Carolina and Matt Gaetz from Florida, offered internships in their offices to Rittenhouse; with Cawthorn stating after the not guilty verdict: "You have a right to defend yourself, so be armed, be dangerous and be moral".

==== Democratic ====
On September 30, 2020, a month after the shootings, then-presidential candidate Joe Biden shared a post on Twitter criticizing then-president Donald Trump for not condemning white supremacists that included a video with an image of Rittenhouse. Conservatives and right-wing politicians called upon Biden to apologize to Rittenhouse. After the November 19, 2021 verdict, Biden (as president) stated "I stand by what the jury has concluded. The jury system works and we have to abide by it." The White House issued a written statement saying "While the verdict in Kenosha will leave many Americans feeling angry and concerned, myself included, we must acknowledge that the jury has spoken[...]."

Wisconsin governor Tony Evers said in a statement that "No verdict will be able to bring back the lives of Anthony Huber and Joseph Rosenbaum, or heal Gaige Grosskreutz's injuries, just as no verdict can heal the wounds or trauma experienced by Jacob Blake and his family. No ruling today changes our reality in Wisconsin that we have work to do toward equity, accountability, and justice that communities across our state are demanding and deserve."

Illinois governor J. B. Pritzker said, "carrying a loaded gun into a community 20 miles from your home and shooting unarmed citizens is fundamentally wrong. It's a tragedy that the court could not acknowledge that basic fact." Chicago mayor Lori Lightfoot acknowledged the verdict and added that "no one should ever take the law into their own hands, or attempt to make themselves the judge, jury, and executioner. What Kyle Rittenhouse did was reckless, dangerous, and showed an utter disregard for human life."

New York's representative Jerry Nadler, who also served as chairman of the House Judiciary Committee at the time, said the ruling was a miscarriage of justice and that the federal Department of Justice (DOJ) should intervene. In response to the verdict, U.S. representative from Michigan Rashida Tlaib said that the American justice system "protects white supremacy". Gun control advocates and California governor Gavin Newsom expressed concern that the verdict would encourage others to engage in vigilantism.

In contrast to other Democratic politicians, former Hawaii representative Tulsi Gabbard praised the verdict.

=== Actions after the verdict ===
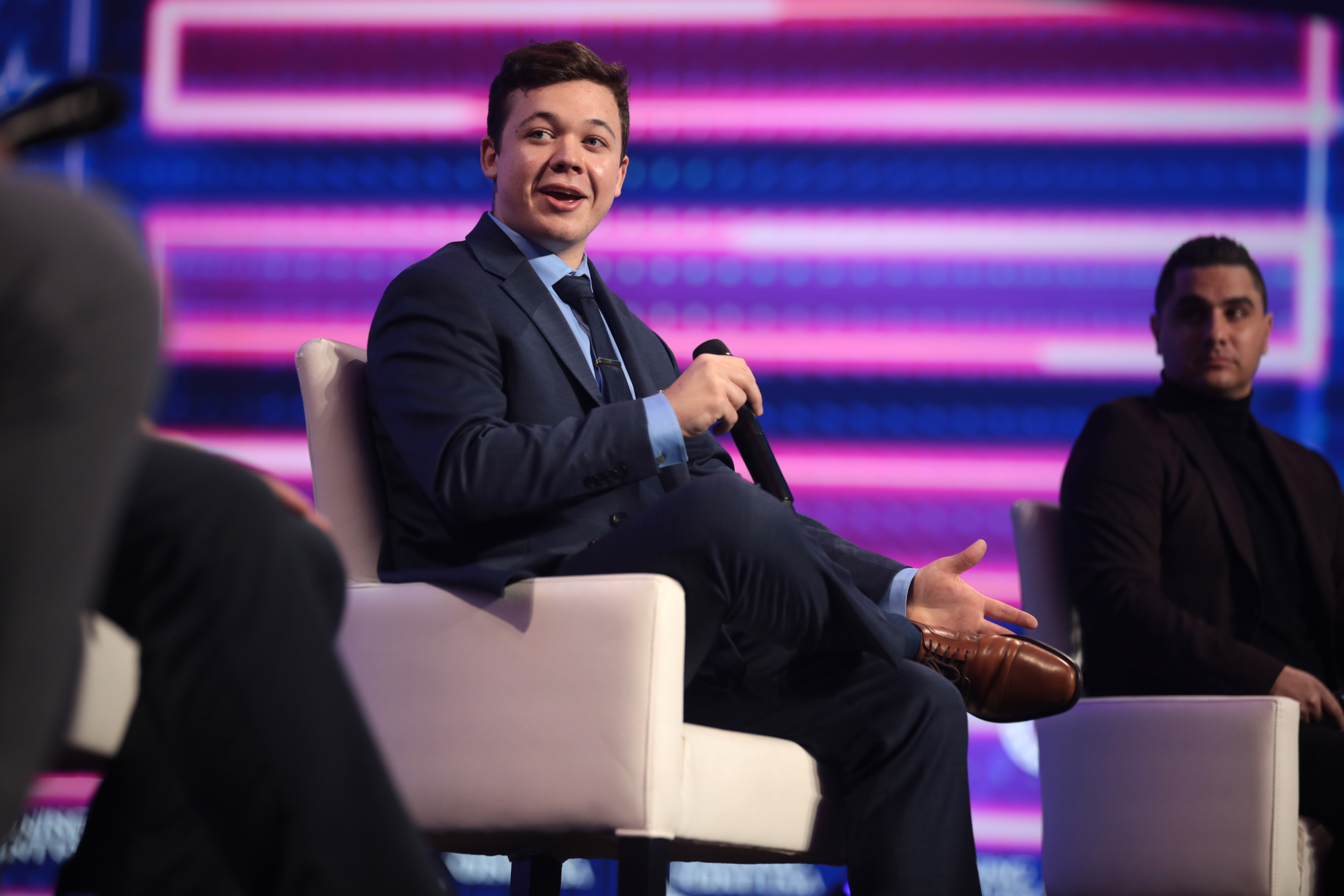
Rittenhouse speaking at AmericaFest, a four-day Turning Point USA conference in Phoenix, Arizona that featured Republican speakers, on December 21, 2021.

==== Street protests and riots ====
People protested the Rittenhouse verdict in multiple large cities in the United States. In Portland, 200 protestors gathered in the downtown area. Authorities declared a riot after protestors broke windows and doors and also attacked police. In Chicago, 1,000 protestors marched against the verdict. In Raleigh, North Carolina, people protested in front of the state Capitol Building. Protests occurred in Brooklyn, New York, where demonstrators blocked lanes of the Brooklyn Bridge. In Middle Village, Queens, New York, protestors damaged vehicles and ripped up flags. Five people were arrested. In California, protesters assembled in Oakland, San Diego, and Los Angeles.

==== Public appearances ====
After the acquittal, Rittenhouse was interviewed by Tucker Carlson from Fox News. Against the advice of Rittenhouse's attorneys, a film crew for Carlson and Fox Nation followed him during the trial for a documentary feature. Rittenhouse made a number of public appearances on conservative programs and at associated events, including a Turning Point USA event titled AmericaFest.

==== Destruction of weapon ====
After state prosecutors and attorneys for Rittenhouse agreed in January 2022 to destroy the weapon, the Kenosha police department destroyed the rifle Rittenhouse used during the event, via shredding on February 25, 2022. Mark Richards, an attorney for Rittenhouse, stated that Rittenhouse did not want the rifle to become a political symbol or trophy.

== See also ==
- List of homicides in Wisconsin
- Killing of Cayler Ellingson
