= Murder of Julie Jensen =

1998 American murder in Wisconsin

- Location: Pleasant Prairie, Wisconsin, U.S.
- Date: December 3, 1998; 27 years ago
- Attack type: Murder, uxoricide
- Weapon: Antifreeze poisoning
- Victims: Julie Carol Jensen, aged 40
- Perpetrator: Mark Jensen
- Motive: Infidelity
- Verdict: Guilty at both trials
- Convictions: First-degree intentional homicide
- Sentence: Life imprisonment without the possibility of extended supervision
- Judge: Bruce Schroeder (2008); Anthony Milisauskas (2023)

On December 3, 1998, Mark Jensen, an American man, murdered his wife, Julie Carol (née Griffin) Jensen in Pleasant Prairie, Wisconsin, by poisoning her with antifreeze. The case is notable for the eventual admission into evidence of a letter written by the deceased prior to her death expressing suspicion of her husband's intentions.

Julie Jensen investigated her husband, checked his planner, photographed a note, and documented her suspicions. She gave the letter to a neighbor with instructions to hand it to police if anything should happen to her. She wrote that she would never commit suicide and that if she died, police should consider her husband a suspect. "I pray that I am wrong and nothing happens, but I am suspicious of Mark's suspicious behaviors and fear for my early demise."

In 2008, Mark Jensen was convicted of first-degree intentional homicide and sentenced to life imprisonment without the possibility of parole, a verdict which was overturned in 2015. After multiple appeals, a second trial convicted Mark Jensen in February 2023.

== Background ==
Julie Griffin was working at a Sears department store in Oshkosh when she met Mark Jensen in 1981. Both were students at a local college; Mark graduated but Julie did not. The couple moved to the Carol Beach neighborhood of Pleasant Prairie, Wisconsin and had two children, David and Douglas, aged 8 and 3 at the time of Julie's death. At the time of her death, Julie worked a part-time job for the Port Authority in Chicago, while Mark Jensen was employed as branch manager of the Racine, Wisconsin branch of a St. Louis-based financial firm.

=== Posthumous letter ===
Julie Jensen wrote a letter addressed to two law enforcement officers. The full text of the letter is as follows:

I took this picture [and] am writing this on Saturday 11-21-98 at 7AM. This "list" was in my husband's business daily planner——not meant for me to see, I don't know what it means, but if anything happens to me, he would be my first suspect. Our relationship has deteriorated to the polite superficial. I know he's never forgiven me for the brief affair I had with that creep seven years ago. Mark lives for work [and] the kids; he's an avid surfer of the Internet...

Anyway——I do not smoke or drink. My mother was an alcoholic, so I limit my drinking to one or two a week. Mark wants me to drink more——with him in the evenings. I don't. I would never take my life because of my kids——they are everything to me! I regularly take Tylenol [and] multi-vitamins; occasionally take OTC stuff for colds, Zantac, or Immodium; have one prescription for migraine tablets, which Mark use[s] more than I.

I pray I'm wrong [and] nothing happens... but I am suspicious of Mark's suspicious behaviors [and] fear for my early demise. However, I will not leave David [and] Douglas. My life's greatest love, accomplishment and wish: "My 3 D's"——Daddy (Mark), David [and] Douglas.

== Trial ==
Special Prosecutor Robert Jambois contended that Mark Jensen poisoned his wife Julie, then 40, with ethylene glycol (antifreeze) and then suffocated her while she was barely breathing in their marital bed in Pleasant Prairie on December 3, 1998. The trial was moved from Kenosha County to Walworth County in response to pre-trial publicity.

Defense counsel Craig Albee argued that Julie Jensen was a depressed woman who killed herself and framed her husband. Moreover, the deceased had seen a therapist at least three times for depression and was aware of her husband's extramarital affair with a co-worker, Kelly LaBonte Grieman, whom Mark Jensen later married, and who assumed custody of the Jensens' two sons after Mark's eventual imprisonment.

Evidence was introduced showing that Mark Jensen had discussed poisoning his wife with co-workers and a jailhouse associate, as well as searching on the internet for information relating to poison. The prosecution contended also that Jensen remained angry over his wife's brief affair in 1991 with co-worker Perry Tarica. The letter's use by the prosecutors was controversial, because such evidence has been blocked from court for years by strict hearsay rules based on criminal defendants' rights to confront their accusers under the Sixth Amendment to the U.S. Constitution. But the Wisconsin Supreme Court, guided by a U.S. Supreme Court ruling (Crawford v. Washington, 541 U.S. 36 (2004)), held that the use of Julie Jensen's letter and statements could be admitted based on the "forfeiture by wrongdoing" doctrine, under which a defendant waives his right to confront a witness if he caused the witness to be absent.

The letter was the critical factor in the trial that ended on February 22, 2008. The jury found Jensen, 48, guilty of his wife's murder after more than 30 hours of deliberations. He was sentenced by Kenosha County Circuit Court Judge Bruce Schroeder on February 27, 2008, to life in prison with no chance of parole. Jensen's sons publicly supported him and requested the judge give Jensen a parole date, publicly declaring their love for their father.

== Appellate proceedings ==
On December 19, 2013, a federal judge overturned Jensen's conviction, and ordered he be released from prison within 90 days. The court agreed with Jensen's argument that the state's use of his dead wife's words violated his Constitutional right to confront witnesses testifying against him. The state of Wisconsin appealed the case, but in 2015 the United States Court of Appeals for the Seventh Circuit upheld the district court's decision on September 8, 2015.

Prosecutors decided to retry Jensen for the murder of his wife in January 2016. On September 1, 2017, Kenosha Circuit Judge Chad Kerkman reinstated Mark Jensen's conviction. On February 26, 2020, Wisconsin's Court of Appeals, District II, issued a summary disposition reversing Judge Kerkman's decision to reinstate the conviction. The matter was remanded to the Circuit Court for further proceedings including trial. Evidence contained in Julie Jensen's letter and voicemail would not be admissible.

Jensen stood trial a second time, starting January 9, 2023, this time before Kenosha County Circuit Court Judge Anthony Milisauskas. Jensen was found guilty on February 1, 2023. On April 14, 2023, he was once again sentenced to life in prison without the possibility of parole. Jensen requested another trial in 2026 due to alleged errors made by the prosecution and defense.
