= 1990 Wisconsin Supreme Court election =

- April 3, 1990

Candidate	Donald W. Steinmetz	Richard S. Brown
Popular vote	355,681	330,067
Percentage	51.87%	48.13%
- Steinmetz: 50–60% 60–70% Brown: 50–60% 60–70%
Justice before election
Donald W. Steinmetz
Elected Justice
Donald W. Steinmetz

The 1990 Wisconsin Supreme Court election was held on April 3, 1990, to elect a justice to the Wisconsin Supreme Court for a ten-year term. Incumbent justice Donald W. Steinmetz was re-elected over Richard S. Brown (a judge on the state Appeals Court).

== Candidates ==
- Donald W. Steinmetz, incumbent justice
- Richard S. Brown, judge on the state Appeals Court

== Campaign ==
The incumbent justice, Steinmetz, was a conservative member of the court. His opponent, Brown, received considerable support as a challenger, and was given an editorial board endorsement by the Milwaukee Journal. Following a contentious campaign, Steinmetz defended his seat to win re-election.

== Result ==
1980 Wisconsin Supreme Court election
Party	Candidate	Votes	%	±%
General election (April 3, 1990)
Nonpartisan	Donald W. Steinmetz (incumbent)	355,681	51.87	
Nonpartisan	Richard S. Brown	330,067	48.13	
Majority		25,514	3.74	
Total votes		685,748	100.0	
