= Thomas Binger =

Wisconsin government lawyer

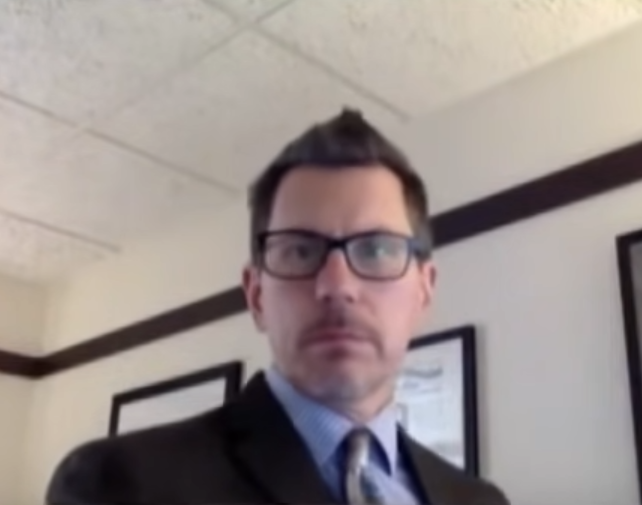
- Binger in February 2021

Walworth County Assistant District Attorney
- Incumbent
- Assumed office 2025
- Governor: Tony Evers (2019–present)
- Lieutenant Governor: Sara Rodriguez (2023–present)

Kenosha County Assistant District Attorney
- In office 2014–2024
- Governor: Tony Evers (2019-present); Scott Walker (2014–2019)
- Lieutenant Governor: Mandela Barnes (2019–2023); Rebecca Kleefisch (2014–2019)

Milwaukee County Prosecutor
- In office 1999–2005
- Governor: Jim Doyle (2003–2005) Scott McCallum (2001–2003) Tommy Thompson (1999–2001)
- Lieutenant Governor: Barbara Lawton (2003–2005) Margaret A. Farrow (2001–2003) Scott McCallum (1999–2001)

Personal details
- Citizenship: United States
- Party: Democratic
- Occupation: Lawyer

Thomas C. Binger is an American lawyer and government official who currently serves as the Assistant District Attorney for Walworth County, Wisconsin. Binger previously served as Assistant District Attorney for Kenosha County from 2014 to 2024. He was raised in Sioux Falls, South Dakota, where he attended the local Washington High School. He ran unsuccessfully as a Democrat for the office of the Racine County District Attorney in 2016. He served as the lead prosecutor in the 2021 trial of Kyle Rittenhouse following the 2020 Kenosha unrest shooting, which ended in Rittenhouse's acquittal. Following the 2024 election of Republican candidate Xavier Solis to Kenosha County District Attorney, Thomas Binger is no longer employed by the office. Following this, he became the Assistant District Attorney for Walworth County, Wisconsin in 2025.

== Early life and education ==
Binger is a native of Sioux Falls, South Dakota. He attended Washington High School in Sioux Falls. While in high school, he competed nationally as a member of the high school's debate team, earning 4th place in a national debate competition alongside his debate partner.

Binger earned his Juris Doctor from the University of Michigan Law School in 1996.

== Legal career ==
Between 1999 and 2005, Binger worked for the Milwaukee County District Attorney's office as a prosecutor. In 2005, he argued a termination of parental rights case before the Wisconsin Supreme Court. The Supreme Court unanimously agreed with his argument that a biological father who has not yet been adjudicated as the father of a child may nonetheless have his parental rights termination for abandonment of the child prior to adjudication. In 2005, Binger began working in private practice at DeMark, Kolbe & Brodek S.C., where he focused on civil litigation. In 2008, he won a $540,000 jury verdict for a local developer. He joined the Kenosha County District Attorney's Office in 2014. In 2015, he served as a prosecutor in the murder trial of Chester Mass, who was accused of murdering his girlfriend. The trial resulted in the conviction of Mass on charges of first-degree intentional homicide. He was an Assistant District Attorney for Kenosha County until 2025. In 2025 he became an ADA for Walworth County. Binger filed charges against Circle Internet Group in 2026, seeking to hold the company in criminal contempt for failing to obey a court order requiring the company to recover the property of a victim of digital asset theft.

=== State v. Rittenhouse ===
Binger served as the lead prosecutor in the trial of Kyle Rittenhouse following the Kenosha unrest shooting in which Rittenhouse shot three individuals. During the trial, prosecutors argued that Rittenhouse was seen as an active shooter and had provoked the other participants while defense lawyers argued the affirmative defense of self-defense on the grounds that Rittenhouse had been chased and attacked.

Hearings held prior to the start of the trial showed a contentious atmosphere between Binger and Wisconsin circuit court judge Bruce Schroeder, who presided over the criminal case. In February 2021, Schroeder declined a motion by Binger to have Rittenhouse arrested after Rittenhouse allegedly violated conditions of his bail by failing to report a change of address. In a separate pre-trial hearing that took place in October 2021, Schroeder ordered Binger to refrain from referring to witnesses as "victims", drawing ire from Binger.

Schroeder and Binger would continue to clash multiple times throughout the trial itself. Binger drew sharp criticism from Schroeder for his line of questioning directed towards Rittenhouse; Schroeder deemed a portion of the cross-examination of the defendant that challenged the motivation for Rittenhouse's post-arrest silence to be a "grave constitutional violation", referring to the right to remain silent guaranteed by the Fifth Amendment, and admonished Binger for bringing up aspects of a prior incident involving Rittenhouse that had been previously ruled inadmissible. Later, Binger criticized Schroeder for what he described as a "fairness issue" pertaining to the judge's handling of the defense's introduction of evidence into the trial.

Citing state ethics guidelines, Binger told media on November 16 that he would not make public comments about the trial following a jury verdict. Three days later, Rittenhouse was acquitted on all charges by the jury. The following month, Binger publicly commented on the case in an in depth interview with the New York State Bar Association's "Miranda Warnings" podcast.

== Political career ==
In 2016, while working as a Kenosha County Assistant District Attorney, Binger unsuccessfully ran for the office of the Racine County District Attorney. Binger announced his candidacy in a Facebook post on April 25, 2016, stating that he would seek election to the role as a candidate of the Democratic Party. His Republican opponent, Tricia Hanson, announced her candidacy the following day.

Binger focused his campaign on two top priorities—to address local problems caused by the opioid epidemic in the United States and to improve coordination between the Racine County District Attorney's office and the local victim's office, which provides support to crime victims. He campaigned to create a treatment program for non-violent drug offenders in which drug addicts would be administered Naltrexone over a twelve-month period in order to allow addicts to avoid prison. He argued that the treatment program would help to reduce the aggregate demand for illegal drugs in Racine County. Binger also supported the creation of separate mental health courts and sought to reduce what he described as racial disparities in how Wisconsinites are arrested and prosecuted.

Financing for Binger's campaign came largely from lawyers and political committees. He received financial support from local affiliates of the Democratic Party, a United Auto Workers–affiliated PAC, as well as the campaign of then-Wisconsin state representative Cory Mason. He also financed his campaign with a ten-thousand dollar loan from himself, as well as donations from other individual and group donors.

Binger lost the election to Hanson; Binger earned 36,988 votes while Hanson earned 51,074 votes.

== Personal life ==
As of 2016, Binger was a resident of Caledonia, Wisconsin, and had lived in Racine County for over ten years.

As of November 2021, Binger has had two children with Nicole Gustafson-Binger, a mental health counselor, and one child from a previous marriage.
