= Bruce Schroeder =

American jurist (born c. 1946)

Wisconsin Circuit Judge for the Kenosha Circuit, Branch 3
- In office May 11, 1983 – November 27, 2023
- Appointed by: Tony Earl
- Preceded by: John E. Malloy
- Succeeded by: Frank Gagliardi

District Attorney of Kenosha County, Wisconsin
- In office August 17, 1972 – January 3, 1977
- Appointed by: Patrick Lucey
- Preceded by: Burton A. Scott
- Succeeded by: John P. Landa

Personal details
- Born: Bruce Edward Schroeder; 1945 or 1946 (age 80–81) Milwaukee, Wisconsin, U.S.
- Party: Democratic
- Spouse: Donna Lane (m. 1972)
- Education: Marquette University (BA, JD)
- Profession: Lawyer; judge
- Known for: Trial of Kyle Rittenhouse

Bruce Edward Schroeder (born c. 1946) is a retired American lawyer and jurist from Kenosha County, Wisconsin. He served forty years as a Wisconsin circuit court judge in Kenosha County (1983–2023). At the time of his retirement, he was the longest-serving state court judge in Wisconsin. He was previously district attorney of Kenosha County. He came to national attention in 2021 due to his role as the presiding judge for the trial of Kyle Rittenhouse. He was also judge in the first trial of Mark Jensen in the "letter from the grave" murder case (2002–2008).

== Early life and political career ==
Schroeder was born in Milwaukee, Wisconsin, and graduated from Marquette University with a bachelor's degree in history and political science in 1967. He went on to Marquette University Law School and earned his J.D. in 1970. While in college, he was a member of the police force in Whitefish Bay.

Shortly after being admitted to the bar, Schroeder was hired as an assistant district attorney in Kenosha County, Wisconsin, under D.A. Burton A. Scott, and moved to Kenosha to accept the job. As assistant district attorney, Schroeder was Kenosha's first juvenile prosecutor.

Less than two years later, the D.A., Burton Scott, was appointed to a vacant county judge position. The Kenosha County Democratic Party endorsed Schroeder as his replacement. On August 17, 1972, Governor Patrick Lucey appointed Schroeder district attorney to fill the remainder of Scott's term. In the Fall general election that year, Schroeder won election to a full term as D.A., defeating Republican Robert V. Baker in a close race. He was subsequently re-elected in 1974 without opposition.

In the 1974 general election, Kenosha County's state senator, Doug La Follette, was elected Secretary of State of Wisconsin, creating a vacancy. Schroeder entered the Democratic primary race for the April special election, but was defeated by John J. Maurer of Pleasant Prairie in a four-person race. Schroeder did not run for another term as district attorney in 1976. He went into private practice after leaving office.

Schroeder was active in politics with the Democratic Party of Wisconsin through the 1970s, serving as the Kenosha County coordinator for the 1974 re-election campaign of U.S. senator Gaylord Nelson, and for the 1978 gubernatorial campaign of Martin J. Schreiber. Due to the 1977 judicial reform laws, a number of new judicial posts were created in Kenosha County in 1978, and at that time Schroeder was named as a likely candidate for one of the new positions. He was not appointed at that time, but served as a court commissioner for the new organization of the Wisconsin circuit courts from 1978 until his elevation in 1983.

== Judicial career ==
In 1983, incumbent Wisconsin circuit court judge John E. Malloy died in office, creating a vacancy. Schroeder was appointed to fill the position by Governor Tony Earl in May 1983, and was subsequently elected to a full six-year term in 1984 without opposition. Since then, Schroeder has been re-elected seven times without facing an opponent; he won his last election in 2020, choosing to retire in 2023 before the end of that term. At the time of his retirement, he was Wisconsin's longest-serving active state court judge.

Schroeder has been the subject of controversy during his judicial career. In 1987, he received attention for his order requiring HIV/AIDS testing for convicted prostitutes. He developed a reputation for being "no-nonsense" and tough on defendants in court and in sentencing. Some attorneys have described him as an "old school" judge. As a result, hundreds of defendants assigned to his court have requested to be transferred to another judge.

=== State v. Jensen (2002–2008) ===
Schroeder first came to national attention while presiding over the murder trial of Kenosha County resident Mark Jensen. In 2002, Jensen was charged with murder for the December 1998 death of his wife, Julie. Prosecutors alleged he poisoned her with antifreeze; Jensen's defense argued that Julie was depressed and committed suicide in an attempt to frame her husband after both had engaged in affairs.

A key evidentiary issue in the case was that Julie had spoken to a number of neighbors and police officers, had written letters, and left voice mails stating that she believed her husband was trying to poison her. Schroeder initially ruled that he would admit the evidence at trial, but following the U.S. Supreme Court decision in Crawford v. Washington, Schroeder ruled that several of these letters, voicemails, and conversations were inadmissible because they amounted to "testimonial" evidence by a witness who could not be questioned by the defense, thus creating a violation of the defendant's sixth amendment right to question his accusers. The state appealed Schroeder's decision to the Wisconsin Supreme Court; Jensen also appealed the ruling, contending that none of the evidence should be admissible. The case was argued before the Wisconsin Supreme Court in January 2006, but their decision was not released until February 2007. In it, they ruled that the evidence could be admitted under the "forfeiture by wrongdoing" exception, in which a defendant may forfeit their right to question a witness against them if the defendant caused the witness to be unable to testify. The Court returned the case to Schroeder then to determine if Jensen could be found to be responsible for Julie's absence by a preponderance of the evidence. Following the Wisconsin Supreme Court ruling, Schroeder held several days of hearings in Summer 2007, after which he ruled that the exception would apply, and the letter would be included in evidence.

The jury convicted Jensen of first degree intentional homicide on February 21, 2008. Schroeder sentenced him to life in prison without the possibility of parole.

After exhausting his appeals in state court, Jensen's lawyers sought to overturn his conviction in federal court. They contended that the letters and other testimonials from his wife should have been excluded from the trial, and further argued that Schroeder—since he had ruled that Jensen was responsible for his wife's absence in the 2007 pre-trial hearing—had pre-judged Jensen's guilt. In 2013, United States district judge William C. Griesbach heard Jensen's appeal. He ruled that Schroeder's evidentiary decision had violated Jensen's sixth amendment rights and ordered a new trial. Because a new trial was ordered, he deemed it unnecessary to rule on Jensen's complaint about Schroeder having pre-judged his case. The state of Wisconsin appealed the district court decision to the 7th Circuit U.S. Court of Appeals, but were unsuccessful in overturning the district court ruling.

Schroeder was not re-assigned to the case when it was re-tried. After several more rounds of pre-trial hearings and appeals, a new trial was held in 2023; Jensen was convicted again and re-sentenced to life in prison.

=== State v. Rittenhouse (2021) ===
Schroeder was again in the national spotlight in 2021 for presiding over the trial of Kyle Rittenhouse, who fatally shot two men during the unrest in Kenosha in August 2020. During the trial, some accused Schroeder of bias towards the Rittenhouse defense. He made several rulings in favor of the defense, including not allowing prosecutors to refer to the individuals Rittenhouse shot as "victims" and allowing the defense to refer to them as "arsonists" and "looters," as long as they could prove they did such activities. Prosecutor Thomas Binger reckoned that Schroeder had already admonished him thousands of times for calling someone a "victim" in other trials. Schroeder was also accused of being harsh towards prosecutor Binger by raising his voice and admonishing him, telling Binger a line of his questioning threatened to undermine Rittenhouse's right to remain silent. According to NPR, several legal experts they interviewed said they believed that specific admonishment was appropriate.

== Personal life ==
Schroeder married court clerk Donna Jean Lane on September 30, 1972, at the St. James Catholic Church in Kenosha. They have two adopted children, Terrence Michael (born 1979) and Mary Lynn (born 1982). Schroeder is a member of the German American Society.

== Electoral history ==
=== Kenosha County District Attorney (1972, 1974) ===
Kenosha County District Attorney Election, 1972
Party	Candidate	Votes	%	±%
General Election, November 5, 1972
Democratic	Bruce E. Schroeder (incumbent)	23,013	52.73%	
Republican	Robert V. Baker	20,626	47.27%	
Plurality		2,387	5.47%	
Total votes		43,639	100.0%	
Democratic hold				

=== Wisconsin Senate (1975) ===
Wisconsin Senate, 22nd District Special Election, 1975
Party	Candidate	Votes	%	±%
Democratic Primary, February 18, 1975
Democratic	John J. Maurer	5,361	46.01%	
Democratic	Bruce E. Schroeder	3,976	34.12%	
Democratic	Michael Zanin	1,425	12.23%	
Democratic	Gerald F. Bellow	891	7.65%	
Plurality		1,385	11.89%	
Total votes		11,653	100.0%	

=== Wisconsin Circuit Court (1984–present) ===
Year	Election	Date	Elected				Defeated	Total	Plurality
1984	General	April 3	Bruce Schroeder (inc)	Nonpartisan	20,400	100.0%	--unopposed--	20,400	20,400
1990	General	April 3	Bruce Schroeder (inc)	Nonpartisan	15,478	100.0%	--unopposed--	15,478	15,478
1996	General	March 19	Bruce Schroeder (inc)	Nonpartisan	17,102	100.0%	--unopposed--	17,102	17,102
2002	General	April 2	Bruce Schroeder (inc)	Nonpartisan	11,927	99.72%	--unopposed--	11,960	11,894
2008	General	April 1	Bruce Schroeder (inc)	Nonpartisan	16,926	99.01%	--unopposed--	17,095	16,757
2014	General	April 1	Bruce Schroeder (inc)	Nonpartisan	11,507	99.14%	--unopposed--	11,607	11,407
2020	General	April 7	Bruce Schroeder (inc)	Nonpartisan	26,063	98.70%	--unopposed--	26,406	25,720

Legal offices
Preceded by Burton A. Scott	District Attorney of Kenosha County, Wisconsin; August 17, 1972 – January 3, 1977	Succeeded by John P. Landa
Preceded by John E. Malloy	Wisconsin Circuit Judge for the Kenosha circuit, branch 3 May 11, 1983 – November 27, 2023	Succeeded by Frank Gagliardi
