= Harold M. Bode =

American judge

Harold M. Bode (January 18, 1910 – December 3, 1993) was a judge of the Wisconsin Court of Appeals.

In 1960, Bode (a Republican) was involved in a political scandal when he jailed Kenosha County Clerk Richard Lindgren (a Democrat) for contempt of court after Lindgren refused to approve air-conditioning equipment for Bode's chambers. Lindgren was freed by Chief Justice John E. Martin of the Wisconsin Supreme Court and Bode was ordered to appear before the court, which ruled against him.

Bode had previously been a Wisconsin Circuit Court judge in Kenosha County, Wisconsin, before serving on the Court of Appeals from 1978 to 1981. Bode died on December 3, 1993.
