= William Eich =

Retired American judge

The Honorable William Eich
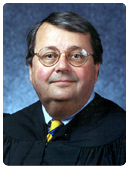

Chief Judge of the Wisconsin Court of Appeals
- In office 1989–1998
- Preceded by: Burton A. Scott
- Succeeded by: Thomas Cane

Judge of the Wisconsin Court of Appeals District IV
- In office 1985–2000
- Appointed by: Tony Earl
- Preceded by: Martha Bablitch
- Succeeded by: Paul Lundsten

Wisconsin Circuit Court Judge for the Dane Circuit, Branch 4
- In office August 1, 1978 – 1985
- Preceded by: Transitioned from County court
- Succeeded by: Paulette L. Siebers

County Judge for Dane County Branch 6
- In office 1975 – July 31, 1978
- Appointed by: Patrick Lucey
- Preceded by: Michael B. Torphy, Jr.
- Succeeded by: Transitioned to Circuit court

Personal details
- Born: Park Ridge, Illinois, U.S.

William Eich is an American lawyer and retired judge. He was Chief Judge of the Wisconsin Court of Appeals from 1989 to 1998. Earlier in his career, he served as a county judge and Wisconsin circuit judge in Dane County, Wisconsin.

== Biography ==
Eich was born in Park Ridge, Illinois. He graduated from Maine East High School in 1956, Beloit College in 1960 and the University of Wisconsin Law School in 1963. Eich and his wife, Lynne, have four children. Eich has published in law reviews and legal periodicals on a variety of legal and government-related topics.

== Career ==
After practicing with a private law firm in Madison, Wisconsin, Eich served as an Assistant and Deputy Attorney General of Wisconsin with Attorneys General Bronson La Follette and Robert W. Warren. In 1971, Governor Patrick Lucey appointed Eich as Chairman of the Public Service Commission of Wisconsin. Lucey later appointed Eich to be a Judge of the Wisconsin Circuit Court in 1975. Eich was appointed to the Court of Appeals by Governor Tony Earl in 1985. He later became chief judge in 1989 and remained in that position until 1998 before retiring in 2000. Since retiring from full-time judicial service, he has remained a reserve judge for the Circuit Court and served as a legal advisor to the Wisconsin State Journal.

Legal offices
Preceded by Michael B. Torphy, Jr.	County Judge for Dane County Branch 6; 1975 – 1978	Succeeded by Transitioned to Circuit court
Preceded by Transitioned from County court	Wisconsin Circuit Court Judge for the Dane Circuit, Branch 4; 1978 – 1985	Succeeded by Paulette L. Siebers
Preceded by Martha Bablitch	Judge of the Wisconsin Court of Appeals District IV; 1985 – 2000	Succeeded by Paul Lundsten
Preceded by Burton A. Scott	Chief Judge of the Wisconsin Court of Appeals; 1989 – 1998	Succeeded by Thomas Cane
