= Martha Bablitch =

20th century American judge

Judge of the Wisconsin Court of Appeals for the 4th district
- In office August 1, 1978 – March 1985
- Preceded by: Position established
- Succeeded by: William Eich

Personal details
- Born: Martha Jean Virtue; October 28, 1944; Lawrence, Kansas, U.S.
- Died: April 4, 2007 (aged 62); Waunakee, Wisconsin, U.S.
- Spouse: William A. Bablitch (m. 1968; div. 1978)
- Children: 1
- Profession: Lawyer

Martha Bablitch (born Martha Jean Virtue; October 28, 1944 – April 4, 2007) was an American lawyer from Dane County, Wisconsin. She served seven years as a judge on the Wisconsin Court of Appeals, from 1978 to 1985. She was married to Wisconsin Supreme Court justice William A. Bablitch.

== Biography ==
Martha Jean Virtue was born on October 28, 1944, in Lawrence, Kansas, to John and Maxine (née Boord) Virtue. Martha grew up in Ypsilanti, Michigan, where her mother was a lawyer and her father an English professor at Eastern Michigan University. She moved to Wisconsin to attend Lawrence University and later graduated from the University of Wisconsin Law School.

== Career ==
Bablitch practiced private law with the firm Bablitch & Bablitch in Stevens Point, Wisconsin. In the 1970s she was a board member for the Wisconsin state Council on Criminal Justice. She was elected to the Wisconsin Court of Appeals for district 4 when it was created in 1978 and re-elected in 1982. She resigned from the court in 1985 after a public battle with depression and alcoholism.

== Personal life and death ==
Martha Jean Virtue took the name Bablitch when she married William A. Bablitch, in 1968. They met while they were both students at the University of Wisconsin Law School. William Bablitch went on to become a member of the Wisconsin Senate and a justice of the Wisconsin Supreme Court. They had one daughter together before divorcing in 1978.

After her retirement, Bablitch devoted her time to the alcohol recovery community in Madison, focusing on other women and lawyers working towards recovery. In April 1986, Bablitch was interviewed in Milwaukee Magazine where she discussed her struggles with depression and alcoholism. On March 17, 2004, her portrait was exhibited along with 14 other Wisconsin women jurists in a celebration of the history of Wisconsin's judicial system.

She died from lung cancer on April 4, 2007, at her home in Waunakee, Wisconsin.
