= John A. Decker =

American judge

John A. Decker (July 20, 1915 - August 16, 2006) was Chief Judge of the Wisconsin Court of Appeals.

A native of Milwaukee, Wisconsin, Decker graduated from the University of Wisconsin Law School. Decker died in 2006. His wife, Margaret, predeceased him. They had one son, who followed his father into law.

== Career ==
Prior to serving on the Court of Appeals, Decker worked with a private practice, was City Attorney of Milwaukee and was a Wisconsin Circuit Court Judge. Decker joined the Court of Appeals in 1978 and immediately became Chief Judge. He remained Chief Judge until 1983 and retired from full-time judicial duties in 1984, though he was a reserve judge afterwards. Decker was also a member of the faculty of Marquette University Law School and the University of Nevada, Reno.
