= Donald W. Steinmetz =

American judge, former Justice of the Wisconsin Supreme Court

The Honorable Donald W. Steinmetz
- portait, as justice

Justice of the Wisconsin Supreme Court
- In office August 1, 1980 – September 1999
- Preceded by: Connor Hansen
- Succeeded by: Diane S. Sykes

Wisconsin Circuit Court Judge for the Milwaukee Circuit, Branch 27
- In office August 1, 1978 – August 1, 1980
- Preceded by: Transitioned from County Court
- Succeeded by: Thomas P. Doherty

County Judge for Milwaukee County, Branch 8
- In office January 1, 1966 – July 31, 1978
- Preceded by: Herbert A. Schultz
- Succeeded by: Transitioned to Circuit Court

Personal details
- Born: September 19, 1924 Milwaukee, Wisconsin
- Died: August 31, 2013 (aged 88) Milwaukee, Wisconsin
- Resting place: Holy Cross Cemetery; Milwaukee, Wisconsin
- Spouses: Marjorie M. Olejniczak; (m. 1944)
- Children: Mary Christine (Bird); Kathleen Marie (Boer); Christian George Steinmetz; Susan Kathryn (Leverson); James Martin Steinmetz
- Parents: Christian Steinmetz (father); Bessie (Engel) Steinmetz (mother)
- Education: University of Wisconsin–Madison; University of Wisconsin Law School
- Profession: lawyer, judge

Military service
- Allegiance: United States
- Branch/service: United States Army; Army Air Corps
- Years of service: 1943–1945
- Battles/wars: World War II

Donald Walter Steinmetz (September 19, 1924 – August 31, 2013) was an American lawyer and judge. He served as a justice of the Wisconsin Supreme Court for 19 years, and before that was a trial judge in Milwaukee County for 14 years.

== Personal life ==
Steinmetz was married to Marjorie Steinmetz, with whom he had five children: Mary Christine Bird, Kathleen Marie Boer, Christian George Steinmetz, Susan Kathryn Leverson, and James Martin Steinmetz. At the time of his death, he had thirteen grandchildren and six great-grandchildren.

== Background ==
Born in Milwaukee, Wisconsin, Steinmetz served in the United States Army Air Forces during World War II. Steinmetz then graduated from the University of Wisconsin–Madison in 1949 and received his law degree from the University of Wisconsin Law School in 1951. Steinmetz was a claims attorney before his service in government. Between 1958 and 1966, he worked as an assistant Milwaukee city attorney, an assistant district attorney in Milwaukee County, and an assistant Wisconsin Attorney General.

In 1964, he was the preferred candidate of Democratic leaders, including Governor John W. Reynolds, Jr., to replace deceased Milwaukee County District Attorney William McCauley, but the post went to Hugh O'Connell.

He was a Wisconsin county judge and later a Wisconsin Circuit Court judge for Milwaukee County after the county courts were combined into the circuit courts. He was also a teacher at the Wisconsin Judicial College. He was elected to the Wisconsin Supreme Court in 1980 and re-elected in 1990.

He died on August 31, 2013, in Milwaukee.

== Notes ==
Legal offices
Preceded by New circuit	Wisconsin Circuit Court Judge for the Milwaukee Circuit, Branch 27; 1978 – 1980	Succeeded by Thomas P. Doherty
Preceded by Connor Hansen	Justice of the Wisconsin Supreme Court; 1980 – 1999	Succeeded by Diane S. Sykes
