= Thomas Cane =

American judge

Thomas Cane is a former Chief Judge of the Wisconsin Court of Appeals.

A graduate of University of Michigan BBA, Marquette University Law School JD and University of Virginia Law School LLM, Cane served in the United States Air Force Judge Advocate General's Corps for three years on Okinawa during the Vietnam War. He would achieve the rank of captain. Following his career in the military, Cane worked in a private practice in Kaukauna, Wisconsin. He later became Assistant District Attorney of Outagamie County, Wisconsin.

== Judicial career ==
Cane was a Wisconsin Circuit Court Judge from 1972 until his appointment to the Court of Appeals in 1981. He later served as a Presiding Judge from 1984 to 1998. Additionally, he became Deputy Chief Judge in 1989. He was promoted to Chief Judge in 1998 and remained in that position until his retirement in 2007. He now serves as a Reserve Judge in Wisconsin.
