= 1984 Wisconsin Supreme Court election =

- April 3, 1984
Candidate	Louis J. Ceci
Popular vote	616,964
Percentage	100%
- County results Ceci: >90%
Justice before election
Louis J. Ceci
Elected Justice
Louis J. Ceci

The 1984 Wisconsin Supreme Court election was held on April 4, 1984, to elect a justice to the Wisconsin Supreme Court for a ten-year term. Incumbent justice Louis J. Ceci (appointed to fill a vacancy on the court) was elected, unopposed.

== Background ==
Ceci had unsuccessfully sought election to a different seat on the court in 1980. He was appointed to the court in 1982 to fill a vacancy left when John Louis Coffey resigned to accept a federal judgeship.

The Constitution of Wisconsin stipulates that early elections full terms can be triggered by a vacancy. The constitution stipulates that it is impermissible for more than one seat to be up for election in the same year. Elections must be moved to an earlier year after a vacancy, but only if there is a more immediate year without a scheduled contest. All supreme court elections are held during the spring elections in early April. The seat had last had an election in 1978, and if the vacancy had not occurred would not have been scheduled to have had an election until 1988. However, the vacancy advanced the date at which the next election would be held. Since there were was no supreme court election scheduled in 1984, but there was an election scheduled in 1983, the vacancy moved the election to the next possible date, 1984. This allowed Ceci to serve as justice for two years before facing election.

== Result ==
1984 Wisconsin Supreme Court election
Party	Candidate	Votes	%	±%
General election (April 3, 1984)
Nonpartisan	Louis J. Ceci (incumbent)	616,964	100%	
Total votes		616,964	100%	
