= 1968 United States presidential election in Wisconsin =

- November 5, 1968

| Nominee | Richard Nixon | Hubert Humphrey | George Wallace |
| Party | Republican | Democratic | Independent |
| Home state | New York (Note: Although he was born in California and he served as a U.S. senator from California, in 1968 Richard Nixon's official state of residence was New York, because he moved there to practice law after his defeat in the 1962 California gubernatorial election. During his first term as president, Nixon re-established his residency in California. Consequently, most reliable reference books list Nixon's home state as New York in the 1968 election and his home state as California in the 1972 (and 1960) election.) | Minnesota | Alabama |
| Running mate | Spiro Agnew | Edmund Muskie | S. Marvin Griffin |
| Electoral vote | 12 | 0 | 0 |
| Popular vote | 809,997 | 748,804 | 127,835 |
| Percentage | 47.89% | 44.27% | 7.56% |

Nixon
40–50%
50–60%
60–70%
70–80%
80–90%
90–100%
Humphrey
40–50%
50–60%
60–70%
70–80%
80–90%
90–100%
Wallace
40–50%
Other
Tie
President before election
Lyndon B. Johnson
Democratic
Elected President
Richard Nixon
Republican

The 1968 United States presidential election in Wisconsin was held on November 5, 1968, as part of the 1968 United States presidential election. State voters chose 12 electors to the Electoral College, who voted for president and vice president.

The 1958 midterm elections saw a major change in Wisconsin politics, as Gaylord A. Nelson became only the state's second Democratic governor since 1895. The state also elected Democrats to the position of treasurer and senator, and that party gained a majority in the State Assembly for only the second time since the middle 1890s. They maintained a close balance in the early 1960s, signaling the state's transition to a swing state. The predicted racial backlash from urban Polish-Americans, seen in the 1964 primaries when George Wallace received over 30 percent of Wisconsin's vote, did not affect Lyndon B. Johnson's big victory in the state in 1964, but had severe effects when racial unrest began in 1966.

Anti-war Minnesota Senator Eugene McCarthy easily won Wisconsin's 1968 Democratic presidential primary against incumbent President Johnson, who soon announced he would not run for re-election in 1968. Former vice president and 1960 Republican nominee Richard Nixon won eighty percent of the vote in the state's Republican primary.

At the beginning of the campaign, the deep divisions within the Democratic Party were worrisome for political scientists and for the party itself. The first poll said that Nixon was certain to carry Wisconsin, and this opinion was repeated early in October.

Hopes remained dim as the election neared despite the belief by local Representative Clement J. Zablocki that the independent candidacy of George Wallace was losing its impact in the racial-unrest-stricken southern urban counties around Milwaukee, Racine and Kenosha, where Wallace had campaigned extensively in September in his effort to put the election into the House of Representatives. Although the gap narrowed in the last polls, Wisconsin was carried by Nixon with 47.89 percent of the vote, over Humphrey with 44.27 percent and Wallace with 7.56 percent. Wallace fared best in rural northern areas away from Lake Superior and in southern suburbs affected by racial conflict.

Wisconsin weighed in for this election as 2.92% more Republican than the nation at large. This was the last election until 1996 that Wisconsin was the most Republican of the three Rust Belt swing states (also consisting of Michigan and Pennsylvania). Wisconsin would vote more Democratic than both Michigan and Pennsylvania in all but one election from 1972 to 1988.

Rusk County was one of only three counties that Nixon won in 1968 but lost in both 1960 and 1972 (Davison and Hanson counties in South Dakota were the other two).

== Primaries ==
Both major parties had state-run preferential primaries held on April 2 included on the ballot of the state's spring elections. The state's spring elections also included nonpartisan general elections for the state's circuit courts, a nonpartisan general election for the state's supreme court, and a binding public vote on whether to ratify three amendments to the Constitution of Wisconsin.

=== Democratic ===
1968 Wisconsin Democratic presidential primary
- April 2, 1968

59 delegates (57 pledged, 2 unpledged) to the Democratic National Convention. (Note: 57 pledged delegates were awarded based on performance in the popular vote. The state additionally had two further delegates unbound by the primary: its national committeeman and national committeewomen.)
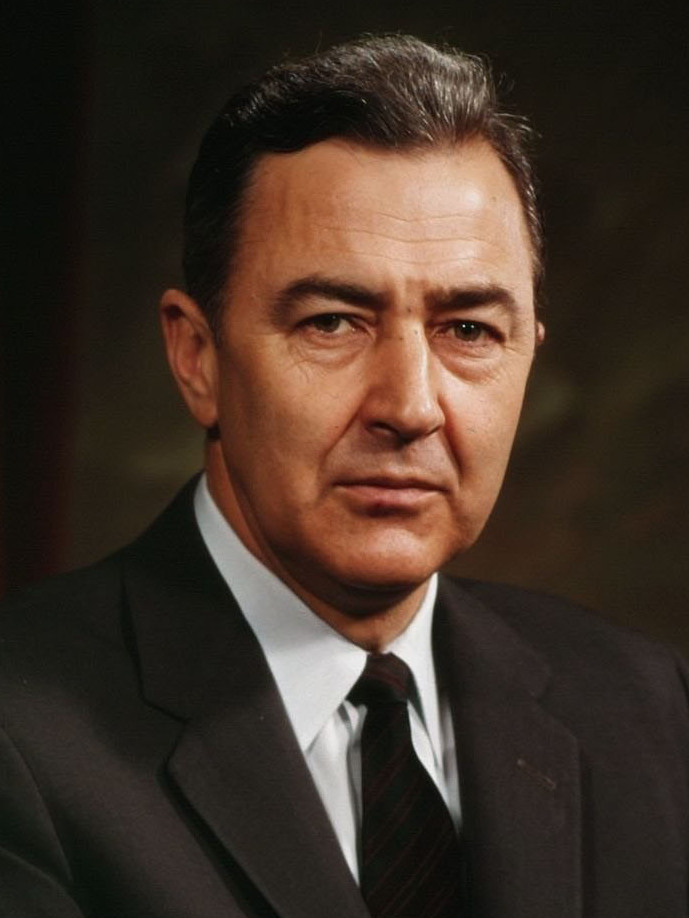

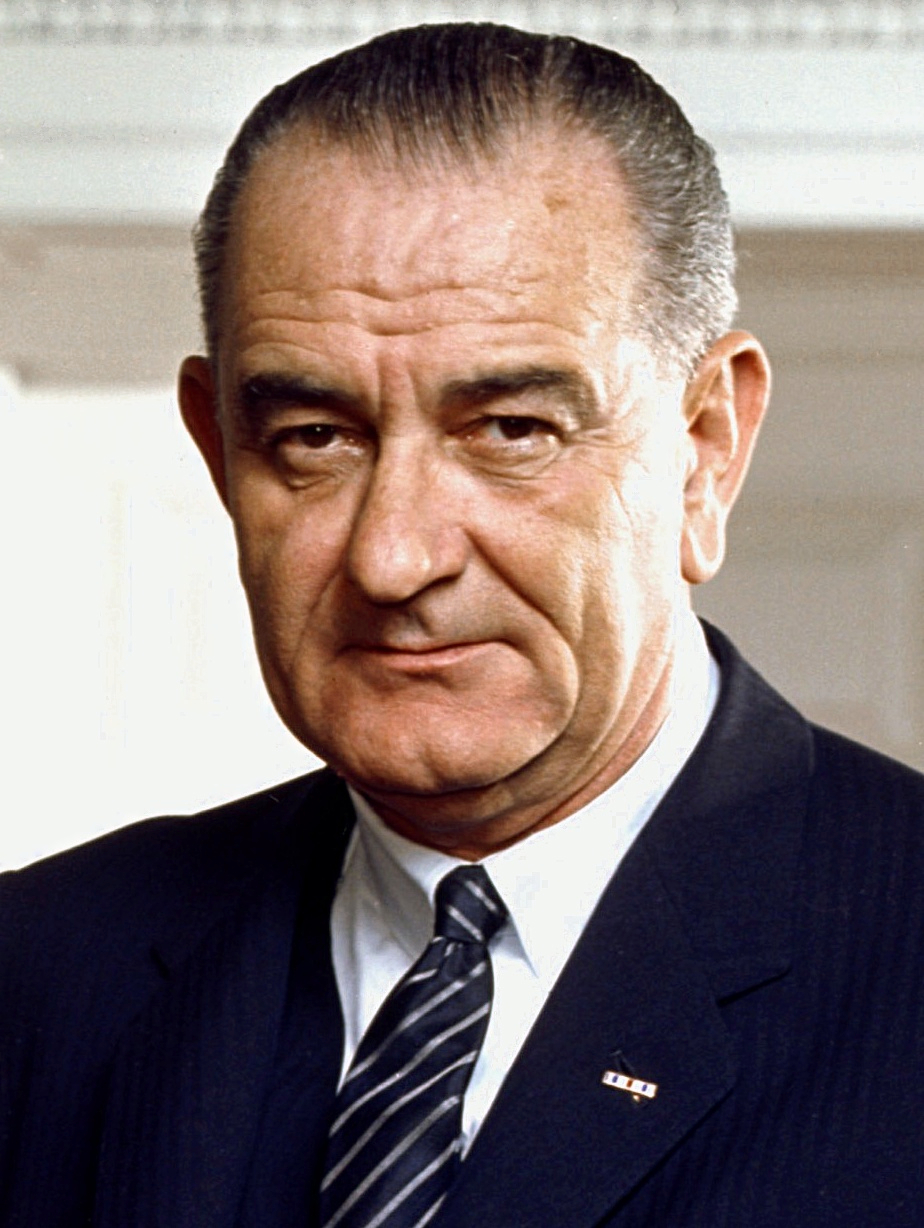

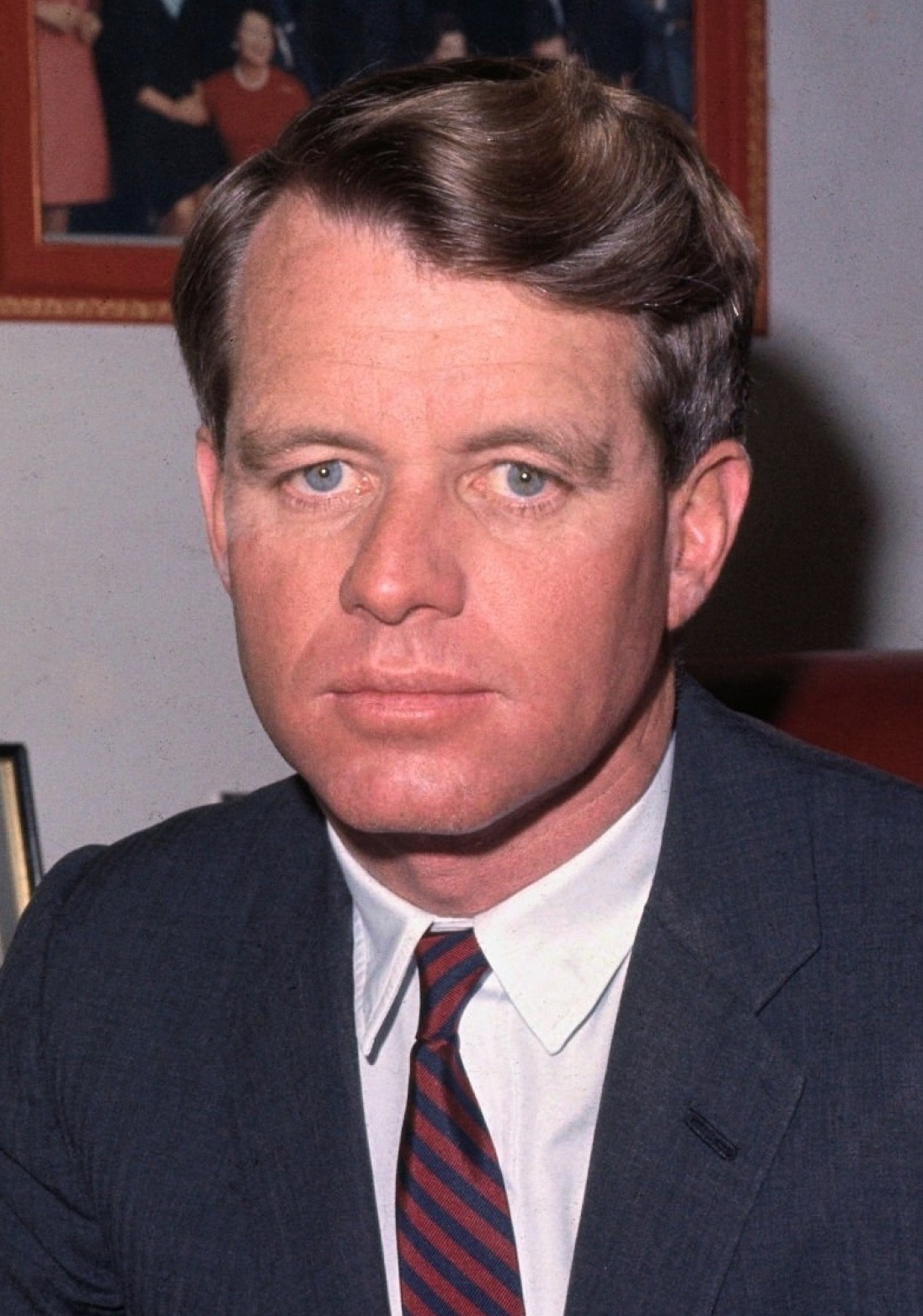
| Candidate | Eugene McCarthy | Lyndon B. Johnson (withdrawn) | Robert F. Kennedy (write-in) |
| Home state | Minnesota | Texas | New York |
| Delegate count | 49 | 8 | 0 |
| Popular vote | 412,160 | 253,696 | 46,507 |
| Percentage | 56.23% | 34.61% | 6.34% |

The 1968 Wisconsin Democratic presidential primary was held on April 2, 1968 in the U.S. state of Wisconsin as one of the Democratic Party's state primaries ahead of the 1968 presidential election.

While he still received votes, incumbent president Lyndon B. Johnson had already ruled himself out for the nomination.

1968 Wisconsin Democratic presidential primary
| Candidate | Votes | % | Delegates won |
|---|---|---|---|
| Eugene McCarthy | 412,160 | 56.23 | 49 |
| Lyndon B. Johnson withdrawn | 253,696 | 34.61 | 8 |
| Robert F. Kennedy (write-in) | 46,507 | 6.34 | 0 |
| None of the names shown | 11,861 | 1.62 | 0 |
| George Wallace (write-in) (Note: While Wallace received write-in votes in the Democratic primary, he was not seeking its nomination. He was instead running a third party campaign as the American Independent Party nominee.) | 4,031 | 0.55 | 0 |
| Hubert Humphrey (write-in) (Note: While he received write-in votes in the Democratic primary, Humphrey was not yet a declared candidate for the nomination. He launched his campaign weeks later.) | 3,605 | 0.49 | 0 |
| scattering | 1,142 | 0.16 | 0 |
| Total | 733,002 | 100 | 57 |

=== Republican ===
1968 Wisconsin Republican presidential primary
- April 2, 1968

30 pledged delegates to the Republican National Convention (Note: All republican delegates were pledged.)
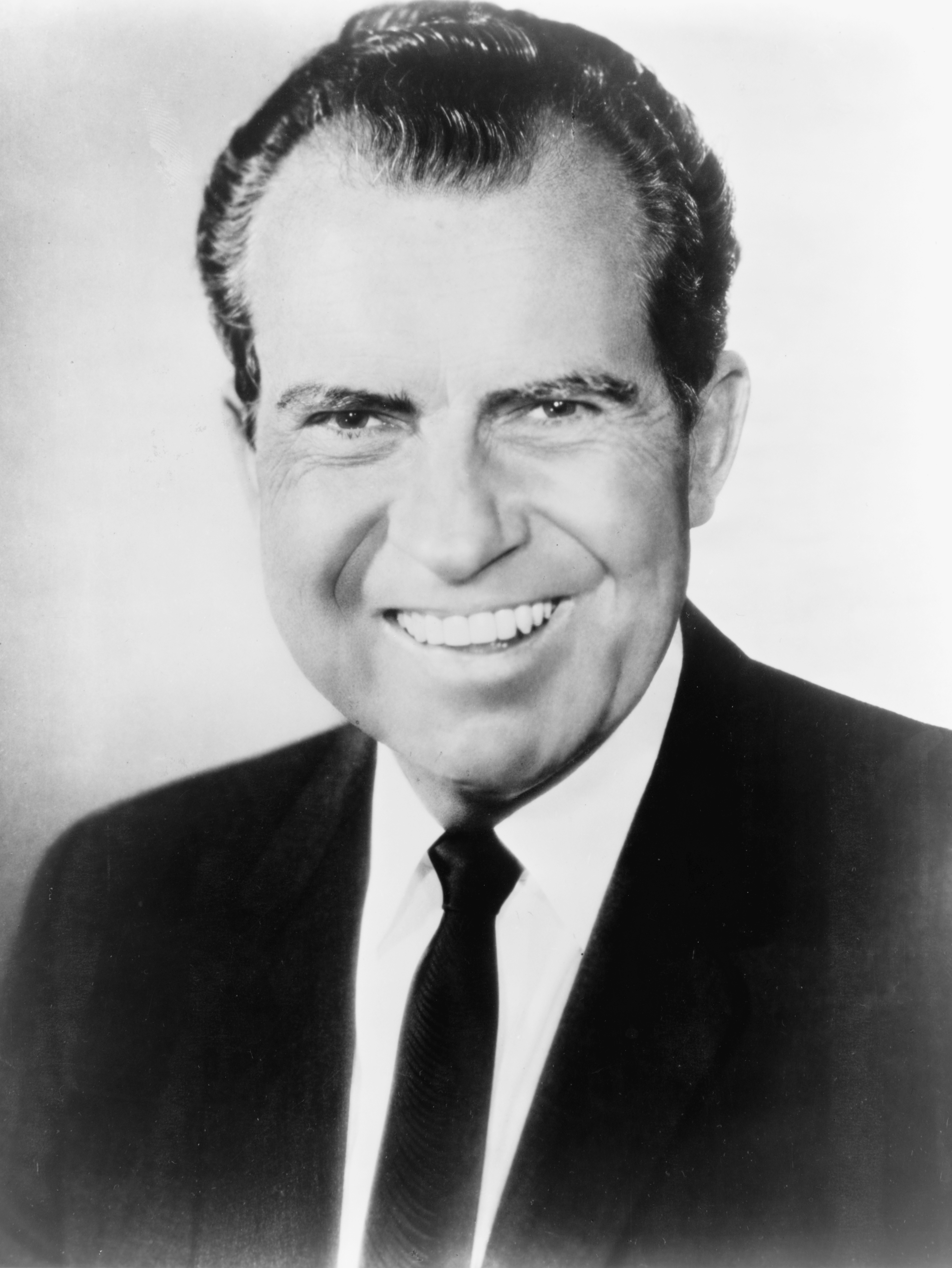

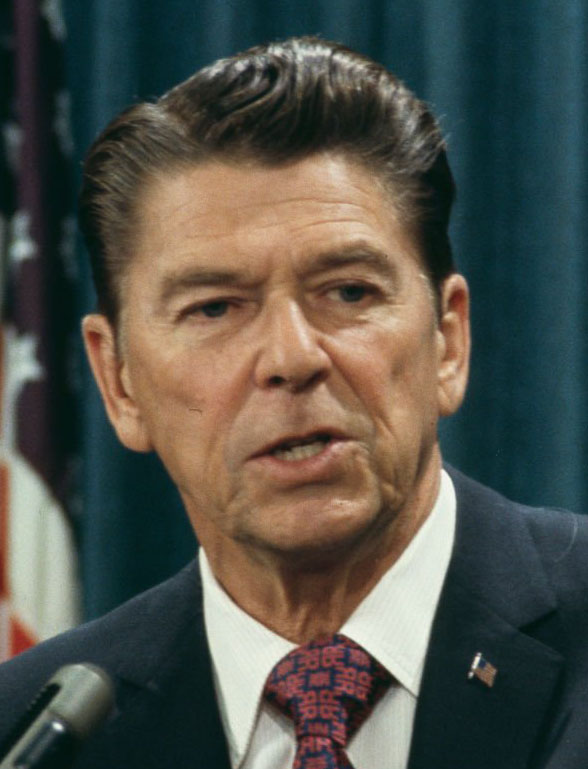

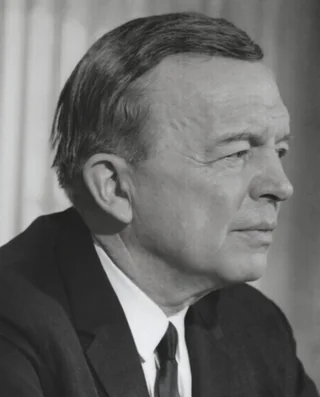
| Candidate | Richard Nixon | Ronald Reagan | Harold Stassen (Note: Although he was born in Minnesota and had served as the governor of Minnesota, in 1968 Stassen's official state of residence was Pennsylvania.) |
| Home state | California | California | Pennsylvania |
| Delegate count | 30 | 0 | 0 |
| Popular vote | 390,368 | 50,727 | 28,531 |
| Percentage | 79.69% | 10.36% | 5.82% |

The 1968 Wisconsin Republican presidential primary was held on April 2, 1968 in the U.S. state of Wisconsin as one of the Republican Party's state primaries ahead of the 1968 presidential election.

1968 Wisconsin Republican presidential primary
| Candidate | Votes | % | Delegates won |
|---|---|---|---|
| Richard M. Nixon | 390,368 | 79.69 | 30 |
| Ronald Reagan | 50,727 | 10.36 | 0 |
| Harold Stassen | 28,531 | 5.82 | 0 |
| Nelson A. Rockefeller (write-in) (Note: While he received write-in votes in the Republican primary, Rockefeller was not yet a declared candidate for the nomination. He launched his campaign weeks later.) | 7,995 | 1.63 | 0 |
| None of the names shown | 6,763 | 1.38 | 0 |
| George W. Romney (write-in) | 2,087 | 0.43 | 0 |
| George C. Wallace (write-in) (Note: While Wallace received write-in votes in the Republican primary, he neither affiliated with the party nor was seeking its nomination. He was instead running a third party campaign as the American Independent Party nominee.) | 585 | 0.12 | 0 |
| Robert F. Kennedy (write-in) (Note: While Kennedy received write-in votes in the Republican primary, he neither affiliated with the party nor was seeking its nomination. He was instead seeking the Democratic nomination.) | 301 | 0.06 | 0 |
| Scattering | 2,496 | 0.51 | 0 |
| Total | 489,853 | 100 | 30 |

== General election ==
1968 United States presidential election in Wisconsin
| Party | Candidate | Votes | Percentage | Electoral votes |
|---|---|---|---|---|
| Republican | Richard Nixon | 809,997 | 47.89% | 12 |
| Democratic | Hubert Humphrey | 748,804 | 44.27% | 0 |
| Independent | George Wallace | 127,835 | 7.56% | 0 |
| Socialist Labor (Note: "Independent Socialist Labor") | Henning A. Blomen | 1,338 | 0.08% | 0 |
| Socialist Workers (Note: "Independent Socialist Workers") | Fred Halstead | 1,222 | 0.07% | 0 |
| Write-in | Scattering (Note: Not listed in the 1969 Blue Book, but are shown separately by county in the Board of Canvassers report) | 2,342 | 0.14% | 0 |
| Totals | | 1,691,538 | 100.0% | 12 |

=== Results by county ===
| County | Richard Nixon Republican | | Hubert Humphrey Democratic | | George Wallace Independent | | Other candidates Various parties | | Margin | | Total votes cast |
| County | # | % | # | % | # | % | # | % | # | % | Total votes cast |
|---|---|---|---|---|---|---|---|---|---|---|---|
| Adams | 1,691 | 44.81% | 1,614 | 42.77% | 461 | 12.22% | 8 | 0.21% | 77 | 2.04% | 3,774 |
| Ashland | 2,557 | 35.74% | 4,147 | 57.96% | 401 | 5.60% | 50 | 0.70% | -1,590 | -22.22% | 7,155 |
| Barron | 7,526 | 55.38% | 5,183 | 38.14% | 867 | 6.38% | 13 | 0.10% | 2,343 | 17.24% | 13,589 |
| Bayfield | 2,333 | 40.91% | 3,036 | 53.24% | 323 | 5.66% | 11 | 0.19% | -703 | -12.33% | 5,703 |
| Brown | 30,133 | 53.65% | 21,615 | 38.48% | 4,341 | 7.73% | 76 | 0.14% | 8,518 | 15.17% | 56,165 |
| Buffalo | 2,992 | 54.20% | 2,112 | 38.26% | 413 | 7.48% | 3 | 0.05% | 880 | 15.94% | 5,520 |
| Burnett | 2,056 | 45.81% | 2,010 | 44.79% | 414 | 9.22% | 8 | 0.18% | 46 | 1.02% | 4,488 |
| Calumet | 5,792 | 56.73% | 3,609 | 35.35% | 792 | 7.76% | 16 | 0.16% | 2,183 | 21.38% | 10,209 |
| Chippewa | 7,772 | 47.37% | 7,335 | 44.71% | 1,282 | 7.81% | 18 | 0.11% | 437 | 2.66% | 16,407 |
| Clark | 6,325 | 51.18% | 4,601 | 37.23% | 1,398 | 11.31% | 34 | 0.28% | 1,724 | 13.95% | 12,358 |
| Columbia | 8,633 | 52.49% | 6,698 | 40.72% | 1,067 | 6.49% | 49 | 0.30% | 1,935 | 11.77% | 16,447 |
| Crawford | 3,316 | 54.05% | 2,391 | 38.97% | 419 | 6.83% | 9 | 0.15% | 925 | 15.08% | 6,135 |
| Dane | 39,917 | 38.05% | 59,951 | 57.15% | 3,771 | 3.59% | 1,265 | 1.21% | -20,034 | -19.10% | 104,904 |
| Dodge | 14,909 | 57.87% | 8,948 | 34.73% | 1,875 | 7.28% | 31 | 0.12% | 5,961 | 23.14% | 25,763 |
| Door | 5,647 | 63.28% | 2,728 | 30.57% | 535 | 6.00% | 14 | 0.16% | 2,919 | 32.71% | 8,924 |
| Douglas | 5,656 | 29.56% | 12,506 | 65.37% | 930 | 4.86% | 39 | 0.20% | -6,850 | -35.81% | 19,131 |
| Dunn | 5,415 | 51.42% | 4,392 | 41.71% | 709 | 6.73% | 14 | 0.13% | 1,023 | 9.72% | 10,530 |
| Eau Claire | 11,799 | 46.64% | 12,302 | 48.63% | 1,169 | 4.62% | 29 | 0.11% | -503 | -1.99% | 25,299 |
| Florence | 821 | 48.32% | 718 | 42.26% | 157 | 9.24% | 3 | 0.18% | 103 | 6.06% | 1,699 |
| Fond du Lac | 18,184 | 55.54% | 12,563 | 38.37% | 1,934 | 5.91% | 62 | 0.19% | 5,621 | 17.17% | 32,743 |
| Forest | 1,264 | 40.14% | 1,470 | 46.68% | 412 | 13.08% | 3 | 0.10% | -206 | -6.54% | 3,149 |
| Grant | 10,789 | 62.49% | 5,414 | 31.36% | 1,054 | 6.11% | 7 | 0.04% | 5,375 | 31.13% | 17,264 |
| Green | 6,502 | 60.97% | 3,501 | 32.83% | 641 | 6.01% | 20 | 0.19% | 3,001 | 28.14% | 10,664 |
| Green Lake | 4,893 | 63.65% | 2,299 | 29.91% | 488 | 6.35% | 7 | 0.09% | 2,594 | 33.75% | 7,687 |
| Iowa | 4,005 | 53.96% | 2,897 | 39.03% | 509 | 6.86% | 11 | 0.15% | 1,108 | 14.93% | 7,422 |
| Iron | 1,137 | 34.26% | 1,913 | 57.64% | 262 | 7.89% | 7 | 0.21% | -776 | -23.38% | 3,319 |
| Jackson | 3,172 | 52.85% | 2,293 | 38.20% | 529 | 8.81% | 8 | 0.13% | 879 | 14.65% | 6,002 |
| Jefferson | 12,478 | 54.91% | 8,716 | 38.35% | 1,470 | 6.47% | 62 | 0.27% | 3,762 | 16.55% | 22,726 |
| Juneau | 3,828 | 53.55% | 2,595 | 36.30% | 712 | 9.96% | 13 | 0.18% | 1,233 | 17.25% | 7,148 |
| Kenosha | 17,089 | 40.54% | 21,427 | 50.83% | 3,548 | 8.42% | 94 | 0.22% | -4,338 | -10.29% | 42,158 |
| Kewaunee | 4,467 | 57.24% | 2,622 | 33.60% | 703 | 9.01% | 12 | 0.15% | 1,845 | 23.64% | 7,804 |
| La Crosse | 17,433 | 55.73% | 11,570 | 36.99% | 2,214 | 7.08% | 63 | 0.20% | 5,863 | 18.74% | 31,280 |
| Lafayette | 4,084 | 55.00% | 2,853 | 38.42% | 470 | 6.33% | 18 | 0.24% | 1,231 | 16.58% | 7,425 |
| Langlade | 3,712 | 49.41% | 3,064 | 40.78% | 718 | 9.56% | 19 | 0.25% | 648 | 8.63% | 7,513 |
| Lincoln | 4,793 | 51.37% | 3,858 | 41.35% | 670 | 7.18% | 9 | 0.10% | 935 | 10.02% | 9,330 |
| Manitowoc | 13,562 | 44.20% | 15,298 | 49.86% | 1,790 | 5.83% | 30 | 0.10% | -1,736 | -5.66% | 30,680 |
| Marathon | 16,907 | 44.36% | 18,063 | 47.39% | 3,051 | 8.00% | 94 | 0.25% | -1,156 | -3.03% | 38,115 |
| Marinette | 7,134 | 48.21% | 6,415 | 43.35% | 1,223 | 8.27% | 25 | 0.17% | 719 | 4.86% | 14,797 |
| Marquette | 2,374 | 61.15% | 1,228 | 31.63% | 279 | 7.19% | 1 | 0.03% | 1,146 | 29.52% | 3,882 |
| Menominee | 179 | 24.19% | 531 | 71.76% | 30 | 4.05% | 0 | 0.00% | -352 | -47.57% | 740 |
| Milwaukee | 160,022 | 39.75% | 206,027 | 51.18% | 35,056 | 8.71% | 1,470 | 0.37% | -46,005 | -11.43% | 402,575 |
| Monroe | 6,938 | 57.70% | 4,012 | 33.37% | 1,056 | 8.78% | 18 | 0.15% | 2,926 | 24.33% | 12,024 |
| Oconto | 5,680 | 53.74% | 3,737 | 35.36% | 1,141 | 10.80% | 11 | 0.10% | 1,943 | 18.38% | 10,569 |
| Oneida | 5,077 | 48.50% | 4,435 | 42.37% | 941 | 8.99% | 14 | 0.13% | 642 | 6.13% | 10,467 |
| Outagamie | 25,080 | 59.25% | 14,224 | 33.61% | 2,956 | 6.98% | 67 | 0.16% | 10,856 | 25.65% | 42,327 |
| Ozaukee | 12,155 | 58.04% | 7,246 | 34.60% | 1,505 | 7.19% | 36 | 0.17% | 4,909 | 23.44% | 20,942 |
| Pepin | 1,493 | 49.95% | 1,263 | 42.25% | 231 | 7.73% | 2 | 0.07% | 230 | 7.69% | 2,989 |
| Pierce | 4,990 | 48.73% | 4,783 | 46.71% | 453 | 4.42% | 14 | 0.14% | 207 | 2.02% | 10,240 |
| Polk | 5,583 | 48.79% | 5,179 | 45.26% | 656 | 5.73% | 24 | 0.21% | 404 | 3.53% | 11,442 |
| Portage | 6,180 | 36.02% | 10,014 | 58.36% | 900 | 5.25% | 64 | 0.37% | -3,834 | -22.35% | 17,158 |
| Price | 3,096 | 47.43% | 2,794 | 42.80% | 621 | 9.51% | 17 | 0.26% | 302 | 4.63% | 6,528 |
| Racine | 28,028 | 44.75% | 27,045 | 43.18% | 7,457 | 11.90% | 109 | 0.17% | 983 | 1.57% | 62,639 |
| Richland | 4,141 | 59.76% | 2,288 | 33.02% | 485 | 7.00% | 15 | 0.22% | 1,853 | 26.74% | 6,929 |
| Rock | 25,229 | 50.92% | 20,567 | 41.51% | 3,655 | 7.38% | 100 | 0.20% | 4,662 | 9.41% | 49,551 |
| Rusk | 2,666 | 44.71% | 2,559 | 42.91% | 726 | 12.18% | 12 | 0.20% | 107 | 1.79% | 5,963 |
| Sauk | 8,608 | 53.54% | 6,406 | 39.84% | 1,019 | 6.34% | 45 | 0.28% | 2,202 | 13.70% | 16,078 |
| Sawyer | 2,475 | 52.16% | 1,830 | 38.57% | 435 | 9.17% | 5 | 0.11% | 645 | 13.59% | 4,745 |
| Shawano | 8,444 | 63.75% | 3,602 | 27.20% | 1,181 | 8.92% | 18 | 0.14% | 4,842 | 36.56% | 13,245 |
| Sheboygan | 17,764 | 44.82% | 20,170 | 50.89% | 1,592 | 4.02% | 108 | 0.27% | -2,406 | -6.07% | 39,634 |
| St. Croix | 6,595 | 46.58% | 6,807 | 48.08% | 735 | 5.19% | 20 | 0.14% | -212 | -1.50% | 14,157 |
| Taylor | 3,043 | 43.95% | 2,910 | 42.03% | 959 | 13.85% | 11 | 0.16% | 133 | 1.92% | 6,923 |
| Trempealeau | 4,861 | 50.67% | 3,971 | 41.39% | 747 | 7.79% | 14 | 0.15% | 890 | 9.28% | 9,593 |
| Vernon | 5,824 | 55.15% | 3,666 | 34.72% | 1,062 | 10.06% | 8 | 0.08% | 2,158 | 20.44% | 10,560 |
| Vilas | 3,339 | 58.09% | 1,798 | 31.28% | 598 | 10.40% | 13 | 0.23% | 1,541 | 26.81% | 5,748 |
| Walworth | 15,040 | 61.82% | 7,505 | 30.85% | 1,755 | 7.21% | 28 | 0.12% | 7,535 | 30.97% | 24,328 |
| Washburn | 2,425 | 47.62% | 2,273 | 44.64% | 384 | 7.54% | 10 | 0.20% | 152 | 2.99% | 5,092 |
| Washington | 12,439 | 54.89% | 8,104 | 35.76% | 2,065 | 9.11% | 53 | 0.23% | 4,335 | 19.13% | 22,661 |
| Waukesha | 47,557 | 54.93% | 31,947 | 36.90% | 6,921 | 7.99% | 160 | 0.18% | 15,610 | 18.03% | 86,585 |
| Waupaca | 10,606 | 67.10% | 3,978 | 25.17% | 1,206 | 7.63% | 17 | 0.11% | 6,628 | 41.93% | 15,807 |
| Waushara | 4,187 | 65.35% | 1,652 | 25.78% | 566 | 8.83% | 2 | 0.03% | 2,535 | 39.57% | 6,407 |
| Winnebago | 25,361 | 53.80% | 18,605 | 39.47% | 3,045 | 6.46% | 128 | 0.27% | 6,756 | 14.33% | 47,139 |
| Wood | 11,795 | 48.25% | 10,921 | 44.68% | 1,695 | 6.93% | 34 | 0.14% | 874 | 3.58% | 24,445 |
| Totals | 809,997 | 47.89% | 748,804 | 44.27% | 127,835 | 7.56% | 4,902 | 0.29% | 61,193 | 3.62% | 1,691,538 |

==== Counties that flipped from Democratic to Republican ====
- Adams
- Barron
- Brown
- Buffalo
- Burnett
- Calumet
- Chippewa
- Clark
- Columbia
- Crawford
- Door
- Dodge
- Dunn
- Florence
- Fond du Lac
- Grant
- Green
- Green Lake
- Iowa
- Jackson
- Jefferson
- Juneau
- Kewaunee
- La Crosse
- Lafayette
- Langlade
- Lincoln
- Marinette
- Marquette
- Monroe
- Oconto
- Oneida
- Outagamie
- Ozaukee
- Pepin
- Pierce
- Polk
- Price
- Racine
- Richland
- Rock
- Rusk
- Sauk
- Sawyer
- Shawano
- Taylor
- Trempealeau
- Vernon
- Vilas
- Washburn
- Washington
- Waukesha
- Winnebago
- Wood

=== Electors ===
These were the names of the electors on each ticket.

| Richard M. Nixon & Spiro Agnew Republican Party | Hubert Humphrey & Edmund Muskie Democratic Party | George Wallace & S. Marvin Griffin Independent | Henning A. Blomen & George S. Taylor Socialist Labor Party | Fred Halstead & Paul Boutelle Socialist Workers Party |
|---|---|---|---|---|
| Warren P. Knowles; William Kellett; Russell Olson; Byron F. Wackett; Peter Hurtgen; James C. Devitt; Janet Norris; J. Curtis McKay; Emily Baldwin; Harold V. Froehlich; Ody J. Fish; Willis J. Hutnik | Gaylord A. Nelson; Bronson La Follette; George Molinaro; Elizabeth Tarkow; Etta Close; Robert Dejewski; Ann Brigham; Carl Otte; Frank Nikolay; Ralph Heller; Jeanette Swed; Art Henning | John Sahy; Karl Koehler; Ronald Hartung; John Harmon; Bernice Habeck; Lloyd G. Herbstreith; R. D. Pennings; J. J. Birkenstock; Mrs. Arthur Krueger; H. S. Tuttle; Edward J. Duquaine; Theodore Grob | Martin Tobert; Percy Steuber; Henry A. Ochsner; Arthur Wepfer; Georgia Cozzini; Alfred Teichert; Clarence Wardall; Robert E. Nordlander; Bruce O. Cozzini; Anton Jonas; Frank Brlas; Marko J. Bolobich | Charles H. Wheeler; Robert Wilkinson; William O. Hart; John P. Schuster; Edward T. Heisler; Wesley W. Weinhold; Kristin J. Penn; Lee E. Steinberg; Linda G. Hansen; Margaret Midelfort; Robin A. David; Lewis D. Pepper |

== See also ==
- United States presidential elections in Wisconsin
