= Leo B. Hanley =

20th century American judge

- portrait photograph, as a justice in the 1960s

Justice of the Wisconsin Supreme Court
- In office September 6, 1966 – July 31, 1978
- Appointed by: Warren P. Knowles
- Preceded by: Thomas E. Fairchild
- Succeeded by: John Louis Coffey

Wisconsin Circuit Judge for the 2nd Circuit, Branch 1
- In office January 1, 1954 – September 6, 1966
- Preceded by: Otto H. Breidenbach
- Succeeded by: George D. Young

Personal details
- Born: April 27, 1908 Milwaukee, Wisconsin, U.S.
- Died: May 12, 1994 (aged 86) Elm Grove, Wisconsin, U.S.
- Resting place: Saint Adalbert's Cemetery, Milwaukee
- Spouse: Sophia Joan Wabiszewski (died 1985)
- Children: 3
- Education: Marquette University Law School (LL.B.)
- Profession: Lawyer, jurist

Military service
- Allegiance: United States
- Branch/service: United States Navy
- Commands: U.S.S. Wildwood (PC-1181)
- Battles/wars: World War II

Leo Bernard Hanley (April 27, 1908 – May 12, 1994) was an American lawyer and jurist from Milwaukee, Wisconsin. He was a justice of the Wisconsin Supreme Court from 1966 to 1978, and previously served 12 years as a Wisconsin circuit court judge in Milwaukee County.

== Early life and education ==
Hanley was born in Milwaukee, Wisconsin, on April 27, 1908. He was raised and educated in Milwaukee, attending public and parochial schools. He went on to earn his LL.B. from Marquette University Law School in 1933 and began his legal career in Milwaukee. He paid his way through school by working at the Wisconsin Club—a Milwaukee country club.

After three years in private practice, Hanley was appointed assistant city attorney in 1936, under Martin J. Torpy. He remained in that job until enrolling for service in the United States Navy during World War II. During the war, he commanded the submarine chaser U.S.S. Wildwood (PC-1181), accompanying military supply convoys across the Atlantic Ocean.

After returning from the war, he resumed his duties in the office of the city attorney. That continued until February 1949, when he was appointed a civil court judge in Milwaukee, succeeding Ted E. Wedemeyer Sr. He was subsequently elected to a full term on April 5, 1949.

== Judicial career ==
photograph of Hanley, circa 1953

In 1952, Milwaukee County circuit court judge Otto Breidenbach announced he would not seek re-election in 1953 and would retire after 30 years on the bench. Hanley was one of three candidates who jumped into the race to succeed him, with his main rival being fellow civil judge Myron L. Gordon.

Hanley and Gordon advanced to the April general election from the nonpartisan February primary. Hanley narrowly won in the general election, receiving 51% of the vote. Gordon was elected to another circuit court branch a year later and also went on to serve on the Wisconsin Supreme Court before being appointed to the federal bench.

Hanley was subsequently re-elected as circuit court judge in 1959 and 1965, and was chosen as chairman of the Milwaukee County board of judges in 1965.

In 1966, Wisconsin Supreme Court justice Thomas E. Fairchild was appointed to the federal United States Court of Appeals for the Seventh Circuit, creating a vacancy on the high court. On August 24, 1966, Governor Warren P. Knowles named Hanley as his choice to succeed Fairchild. Hanley was described then as a well-respected jurist without any political affiliations. At the time, joining the Supreme Court actually meant taking a $1,000 pay cut from his salary as a circuit court judge.

Hanley was sworn in on September 6, 1966. He went on to win a full ten-year term in the 1968 spring election, facing no opposition. Hanley was considered to be a member of the court's ideologically conservative wing. Hanley retired in 1978, at the end of his ten-year term, but remained active in courts around the state for several years afterward as a reserve judge. As a reserve judge, he oversaw a consequential investigation into corruption in the Milwaukee County sheriff's office.

== Personal life ==
Leo Hanley married Sophia Wabiszewski. They had three sons together, all sons went on to graduate from Marquette Law School.

Hanley died on May 12, 1994.

== Electoral history ==
=== Wisconsin Circuit Court (1953) ===
Wisconsin Circuit Courts, 2nd Circuit, Branch 1 Election, 1953
Party	Candidate	Votes	%	±%
General Election, April 7, 1953
Nonpartisan	Leo B. Hanley	105,303	51.41%	
Nonpartisan	Myron L. Gordon	99,546	48.59%	
Plurality		5,757	2.81%	
Total votes		204,849	100.0%	

=== Wisconsin Supreme Court (1968) ===
1968 Wisconsin Supreme Court election
Party	Candidate	Votes	%
General election (April 15, 1968)
Nonpartisan	Leo B. Hanley (incumbent)	884,421	unopposed

Legal offices
Preceded by Otto H. Breidenbach	Wisconsin Circuit Judge for the 2nd Circuit, Branch 1 January 1, 1954 – September 6, 1966	Succeeded by George D. Young
Preceded by Thomas E. Fairchild	Justice of the Wisconsin Supreme Court; September 6, 1966 – July 31, 1978	Succeeded by John Louis Coffey
