= Louis J. Ceci =

American judge (1927–2026)

Louis Ceci
- Ceci, circa 1983

Justice of the Wisconsin Supreme Court
- In office April 15, 1982 – September 4, 1993
- Appointed by: Lee S. Dreyfus
- Preceded by: John Louis Coffey
- Succeeded by: Janine P. Geske

Wisconsin Circuit Judge for the Milwaukee Circuit, Branch 1
- In office August 1, 1978 – April 15, 1982
- Preceded by: Transitioned from 2nd circ.
- Succeeded by: Charles B. Schudson

Wisconsin Circuit Judge for the 2nd Circuit, Branch 1
- In office January 1, 1974 – July 31, 1978
- Preceded by: Elmer W. Roller
- Succeeded by: Transitioned to Milwaukee circ.

County Judge of Milwaukee County, Branch 3
- In office September 14, 1968 – December 31, 1973
- Appointed by: Warren P. Knowles
- Preceded by: John A. Krueger
- Succeeded by: Terence T. Evans

Member of the Wisconsin State Assembly from the Milwaukee 18th district
- In office January 4, 1965 – January 2, 1967
- Preceded by: Michael J. Barron
- Succeeded by: James E. Held

Personal details
- Born: September 10, 1927 New York City, U.S.
- Died: January 27, 2026 (aged 98)
- Party: Republican
- Spouse: Shirley Haldi (m. 1956; died 2022)
- Children: 6
- Education: Marquette University (Ph.B.); Marquette Law School (J.D.)
- Profession: Lawyer, judge

Military service
- Allegiance: United States
- Branch/service: United States Navy
- Years of service: 1945–1946
- Battles/wars: World War II: Pacific War

Louis John Ceci (September 10, 1927 – January 27, 2026) was an American lawyer, jurist and Republican politician. He was a justice of the Wisconsin Supreme Court from 1982 through 1993, after serving eight years as a Wisconsin circuit court judge in Milwaukee County. Ceci previously represented northern Milwaukee County in the Wisconsin State Assembly during the 1965 session.

== Early life ==
Louis Ceci was born in New York City on September 10, 1927, the son of Italian American immigrants. At fourteen, he moved to Milwaukee, Wisconsin to live with his eldest brother, Gabriel, and his wife, Mary. Before completing high school, at age 17, he enlisted in the United States Navy, and went to serve in the Pacific Theater of World War II.

After returning from the war, he graduated from Theodore Roosevelt High School in New York City, in 1947. He went on to attend Marquette University in Milwaukee, where he earned his bachelor's degree in 1951 and his J.D. in 1954.

== Legal and political career ==
Ceci was admitted to the bar and started his own law practice in Milwaukee. He made his first attempt for election to the Wisconsin State Assembly in 1956, but lost badly in the Republican Party primary, earning just 19% of the vote. He was then employed as assistant city attorney in 1958, working for Milwaukee city attorney Walter J. Mattison. Ceci ultimately remained in the city attorney's office until 1963.

In 1964, Ceci made another attempt for election to Wisconsin State Assembly. This time he was unopposed in the Republican primary. He went on to win a narrow victory in the general election, receiving 51% of the vote. He represented Milwaukee County's 18th Assembly district, which then comprised the farthest northern parts of the city and county. During his term in the Assembly, he served on the Assembly Committee on Commerce and Manufacturers, and on the Joint Committee on Repeals, Revisions, and Uniform Laws.

Rather than running for re-election in 1966, he launched a campaign for Attorney General of Wisconsin. He faced a primary against Taylor County district attorney John Olson, but had substantial support from party leadership, boosted by his colleagues in the Assembly, and Olson ultimately dropped out of the race. Ceci went on to defeat in the general election, losing to the incumbent, Bronson La Follette. Two years later, he began another campaign for Attorney General, but this time could not muster significant support at the Republican State Convention. He quit the race before the primary.

== Judicial career ==
Shortly after bowing out of the 1968 primary, Ceci was appointed Milwaukee County judge for the traffic branch by Governor Warren P. Knowles, filling the vacancy caused by the suicide of judge John A. Krueger. He was subsequently elected to a full term as county judge and served until the end of 1973. In 1972, incumbent circuit judge George D. Young was declared medically incapacitated, triggering a new election. Ceci entered the race for the open seat and won the April 1973 election without opposition. He was re-elected without opposition in 1979. As a county judge and circuit judge, Ceci clashed at times with Milwaukee County District Attorney E. Michael McCann and with the Milwaukee County Sheriff's Department.

In 1980, he ran for Wisconsin Supreme Court. After a strong first place finish in the nonpartisan primary, he was narrowly defeated in the April general election by fellow Milwaukee judge Donald W. Steinmetz. Nevertheless, two years later, when Wisconsin Supreme Court justice John Louis Coffey was appointed to the federal Seventh Circuit Court of Appeals, Ceci was appointed to the Supreme Court by Governor Lee S. Dreyfus. He was subsequently elected to a full ten-year term on the court in April 1984, without facing an opponent in that election. With a year left in his term, in 1993, Ceci announced his plans to retire early, allowing Governor Tommy Thompson to appoint a replacement. At the time of his retirement, Ceci's judicial philosophy was classified as one of the most conservative among the court's justices.

== Personal life and death ==
Ceci married twice. He was married to Dorothy Zukowski from 1947 to 1954, and to Shirley Haldi from 1954 until her death in 2022. They were married for over 65 years. He had six children, three from his first marriage and three from his second. Ceci resided in Wauwatosa, Wisconsin. He died on January 27, 2026, at the age of 98.

== Electoral history ==
=== Wisconsin Assembly (1956) ===
Wisconsin Assembly, Milwaukee 18th District Election, 1956
Party	Candidate	Votes	%	±%
Republican Primary, September 11, 1956
Republican	John R. Meyer	11,431	75.59%	
Republican	Louis J. Ceci	890	19.43%	
Republican	Walter R. Sukowatey	228	4.98%	
Plurality		2,572	56.16%	
Total votes		4,580	100.0%	

=== Wisconsin Assembly (1964) ===
Wisconsin Assembly, Milwaukee 18th District Election, 1964
Party	Candidate	Votes	%	±%
General Election, November 3, 1964
Republican	Louis J. Ceci	11,431	50.93%	+12.69%
Democratic	Otto H. Schneider	11,014	49.07%	
Plurality		417	1.86%	-21.66%
Total votes		22,445	100.0%	+88.82%
Republican gain from Democratic				

=== Wisconsin Attorney General (1966) ===
1966 Wisconsin Attorney General election
Party	Candidate	Votes	%	±%
General Election, November 8, 1966
Democratic	Bronson La Follette (incumbent)	609,216	53.56%	−0.76%
Republican	Louis J. Ceci	528,202	46.44%	
Plurality		81,014	7.12%	-1.52%
Total votes		1,137,418	100.0%	-29.97%
Democratic hold				

=== Wisconsin Supreme Court (1980) ===
1980 Wisconsin Supreme Court election
Party	Candidate	Votes	%	±%
Nonpartisan Primary, February 19, 1980
Nonpartisan	Louis J. Ceci	142,702	46.15%	
Nonpartisan	Donald W. Steinmetz	90,286	29.20%	
Nonpartisan	P. Charles Jones	76,253	24.66%	
Total votes		309,241	100.0%	
General Election, April 1, 1980
Nonpartisan	Donald W. Steinmetz	663,378	50.18%	
Nonpartisan	Louis J. Ceci	658,605	49.82%	
Plurality		4,773	0.36%	-29.89%
Total votes		1,321,983	100.0%	+57.39%

=== Wisconsin Supreme Court (1984) ===
1984 Wisconsin Supreme Court election
Party	Candidate	Votes	%	±%
General Election, April 3, 1984
Nonpartisan	Louis J. Ceci (incumbent)	616,964	100%	
Total votes		616,964	100%	

Party political offices
Preceded by George Thompson	Republican nominee for Attorney General of Wisconsin; 1966	Succeeded by Robert W. Warren
Wisconsin State Assembly
Preceded by Michael J. Barron	Member of the Wisconsin State Assembly from the Milwaukee 18th district January 4, 1965 – January 2, 1967	Succeeded by James E. Held
Legal offices
Preceded by John A. Krueger	County Judge of Milwaukee County, Branch 3 September 14, 1968 – December 31, 1973	Succeeded by Terence T. Evans
Preceded by Elmer W. Roller	Wisconsin Circuit Judge for the 2nd Circuit, Branch 1 January 1, 1974 – July 31, 1978	Circuit abolished
New circuit	Wisconsin Circuit Judge for the Milwaukee Circuit, Branch 1 August 1, 1978 – April 15, 1982	Succeeded by Charles B. Schudson
Preceded by John Louis Coffey	Justice of the Wisconsin Supreme Court; April 15, 1982 – September 4, 1993	Succeeded by Janine P. Geske
