= James E. Held =

20th century American politician

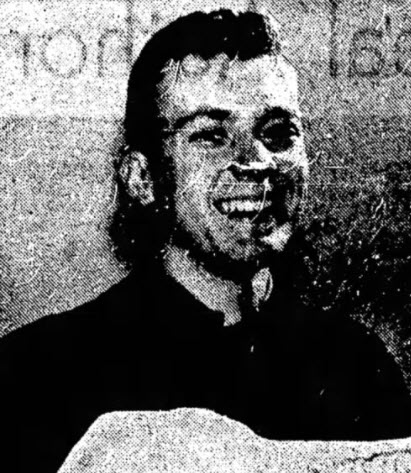

Member of the Wisconsin State Assembly from the Milwaukee 18th district
- In office January 2, 1967 – October 15, 1967 (died)
- Preceded by: Louis J. Ceci
- Succeeded by: Ervin Schneeberg

Personal details
- Born: February 16, 1938 Racine, Wisconsin, U.S.
- Died: October 15, 1967 (aged 29) Milwaukee County General Hospital, Wauwatosa, Wisconsin, U.S.
- Cause of death: Traffic collision
- Resting place: Holy Cross Cemetery, Milwaukee
- Party: Republican
- Education: Marquette University (BA); Georgetown University (LLB)
- Profession: Lawyer

James E. Held (February 16, 1938 – October 15, 1967) was an American lawyer and politician from Milwaukee County, Wisconsin. He was elected to represent the northern suburbs of Milwaukee in the 1967 session, but died ten months into that term in a traffic accident. Prior to serving in the Assembly, Held was an assistant to county executive John Doyne.

== Early life and education ==
Held was born and raised in Racine, Wisconsin. He graduated from Racine's St. Catherine's High School, then attended Marquette University, and the Georgetown University Law Center.

== Career ==
Held practiced law and worked as a staffer in the office of the Milwaukee County executive, John Doyne. Held was elected to the Assembly in 1966, running on the Republican Party ticket. He represented Milwaukee County's 18th Assembly district from January 1967 until his death in October 1967.

== Personal life ==
Held was fatally injured in a traffic collision in Milwaukee County, Wisconsin, on October 15, 1967, when his car struck a parked tow truck on a Milwaukee County highway. He died a short time after the accident at Milwaukee County General Hospital, in Wauwatosa, Wisconsin.

Wisconsin State Assembly
Preceded by Louis J. Ceci	Member of the Wisconsin State Assembly from the Milwaukee 18th district January 2, 1967 – October 15, 1967	Succeeded by Ervin Schneeberg
