= 1980 United States presidential election in Wisconsin =

- November 4, 1980

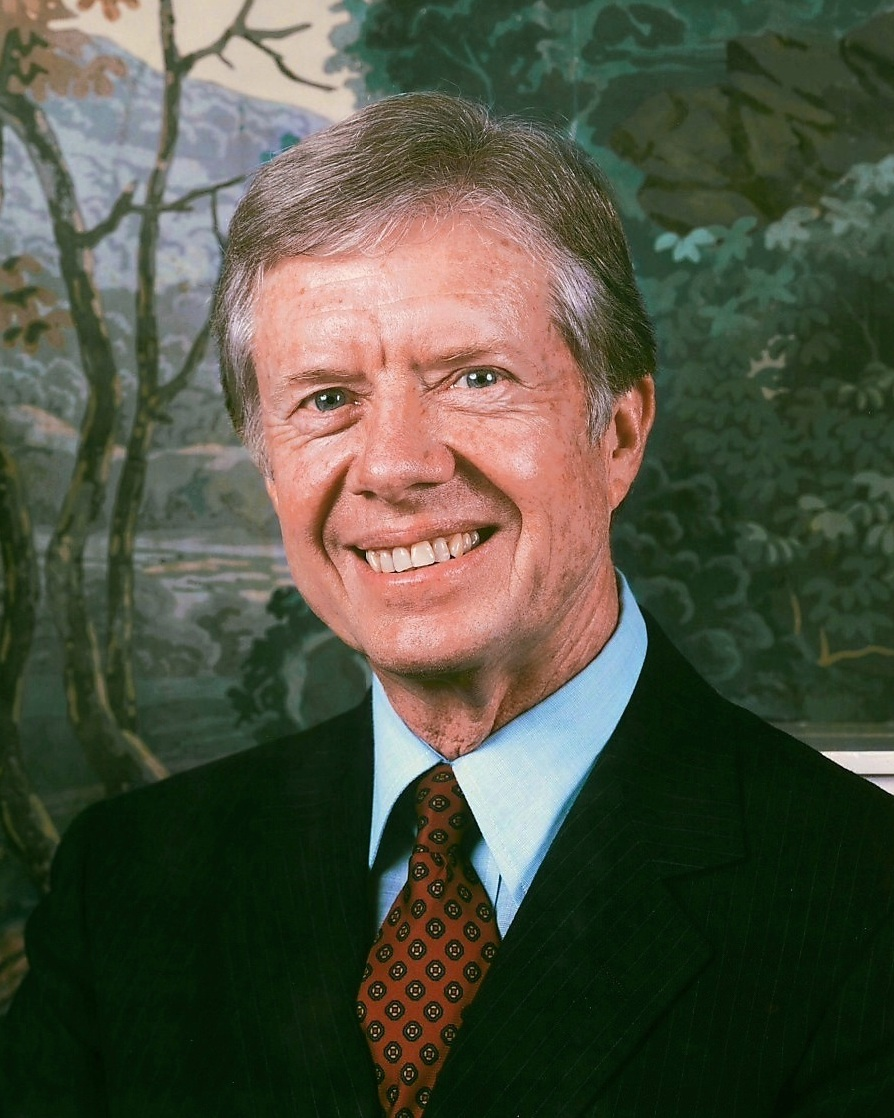

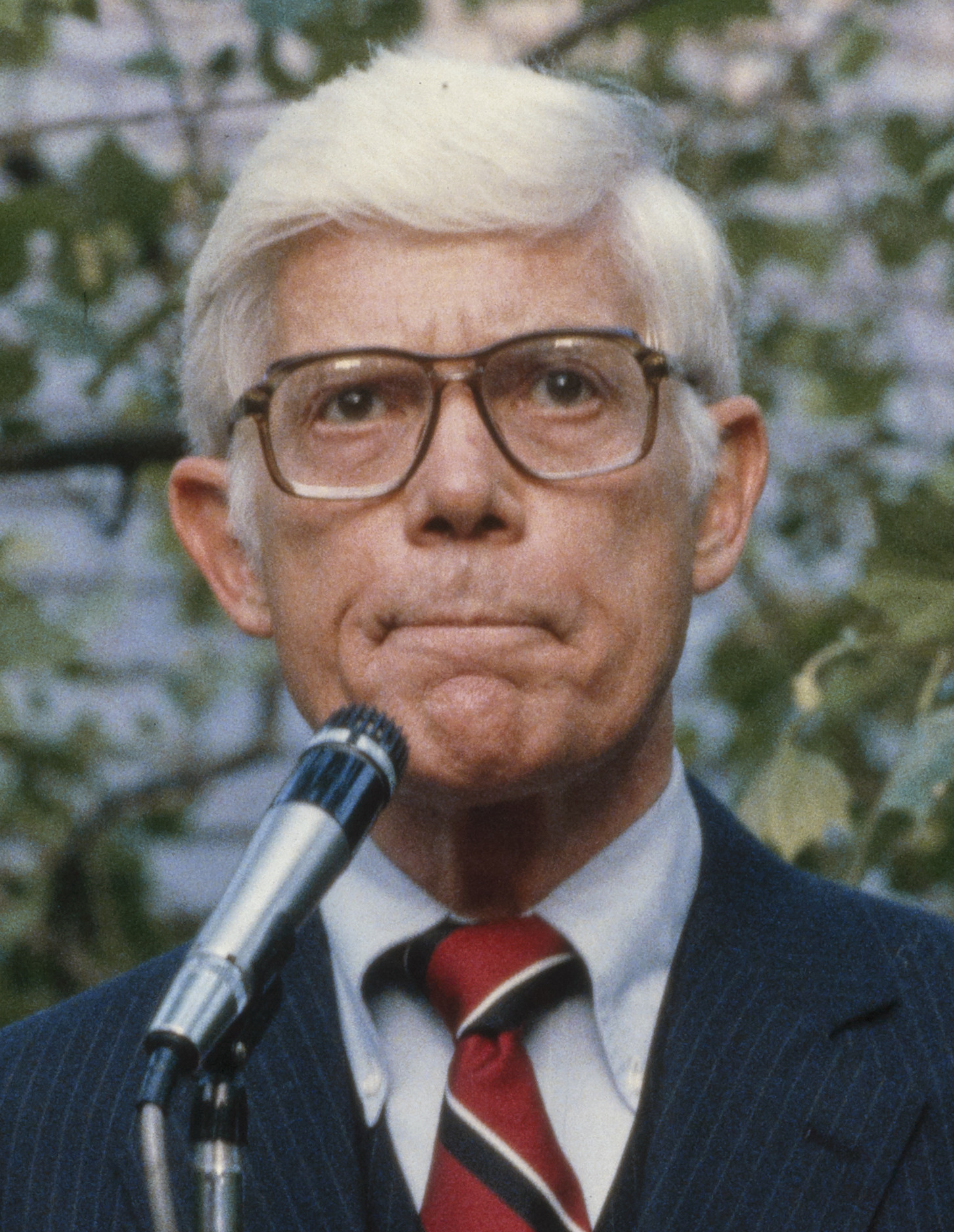
Nominee	Ronald Reagan	Jimmy Carter	John B. Anderson
Party	Republican	Democratic	Independent
Home state	California	Georgia	Illinois
Running mate	George H. W. Bush	Walter Mondale	Patrick Lucey
Electoral vote	11	0	0
Popular vote	1,088,845	981,584	160,657
Percentage	47.90%	43.18%	7.07%
County results
Reagan
40–50%
50–60%
60–70%
Carter
40–50%
50–60%
President before election
Jimmy Carter
Democratic
Elected President
Ronald Reagan
Republican

The 1980 United States presidential election in Wisconsin took place on November 4, 1980. All 50 states and The District of Columbia, were part of the 1980 United States presidential election. State voters chose 11 electors to the Electoral College, who voted for president and vice president.

The Republican ticket of Ronald Reagan and running mate George H. W. Bush carried Wisconsin. The state voted nearly 5% more Democratic than the nation-at-large.

== Primaries ==
Wisconsin held Democratic and Republican presidential primaries on April 1, coinciding with Wisconsin's Spring general elections for nonpartisan state and local offices (including a Wisconsin Supreme Court election and a Milwaukee mayoral election).

The primaries occurred the same day as Democratic and Republican primaries in Kansas. In both Wisconsin and Kansas, incumbent president Jimmy Carter won a landslide victory in the Democratic primaries and former California governor Ronald Reagan won a landslide victory in the Republican primaries.

=== Democratic primary ===
The Democratic primary had three candidates: incumbent president Jimmy Carter, U.S. Senator Ted Kennedy, and California Governor Jerry Brown. The result in Wisconsin had the impact of narrowing the field of contenders for the Democratic nomination down to two, with Brown's third-place finish driving him out of the race. After the combined wins in Wisconsin and Kansas on April 1, Carter stood just over halfway to the 1,666 delegate count needed to secure the Democratic Party's nomination. The Associated Press estimated that, following these wins, Carter had secured 852 delegates, well ahead of the 427 delegates that Kennedy had secured. With Louisiana (a Southern state) holding the next contest, Carter was anticipated to immediately build upon his momentum coming out of his Wisconsin and Kansas wins. Carter was himself a southerner from Georgia, while Kennedy was a northerner from the New England state of Massachusetts.

Brown an underdog in the race, had heavily campaigned across Wisconsin in the weeks prior to the primary. He had hoped for a strong showing in Wisconsin to propel his candidacy. In the weeks leading up to the primary, Brown made appearances in all nine of Wisconsin's congressional districts, and visited many of the state's college campuses. Placing below 20% in Wisconsin (after having placed low in earlier primaries), Brown's campaign lost his eligibility for further federal matching funds. He could only regain eligibility if he were to secure at least 20% of the vote in a subsequent primary. Two hours after polls closed in Wisconsin, Brown delivered a concession speech at a hotel in Downtown Milwaukee, declaring, "it is obvious that the voters have spoken and have given their verdict. This will be the last contest in which I will participate in 1980."

Brown performed the strongest in the 2nd congressional district, which included, Madison. After placing a distant third in the state's primary result, Brown suspended his presidential campaign. He had earned a district delegate in the 2nd district. As he had failed to win any delegates prior to Wisconsin, it marked the first delegate he had won.

Candidate	Votes	Delegates
Jimmy Carter (incumbent)	353,662	46
Ted Kennedy	189,520	25
Jerry Brown	74,496	10
Others	11,491	0
Totals	629,916	81

=== Republican primary ===
By the time of the Wisconsin primary, the race for the Republican nomination had narrowed to three contenders: former California governor Ronald Reagan, former ambassador to the U.N. George H. W. Bush, and Illinois Congressman John B. Anderson. Heading into the Wisconsin primary, Reagan stood in a strong position as a formidable front-runner. With his wins in both Wisconsin and Kansas, Reagan bolstered this lead. Following the result, Reagan declared that, while he had not yet secured the Republican nomination, his wins "make for a substantial lead". After the wins in Wisconsin and Kansas, the Associated Press calculated that Reagan had secured 343 delegates of the 998 he would need to secure his party's nomination. Bush trailed with 72, and Anderson had 57. The conservative Reagan was widely anticipated to further build his delegate lead in Louisiana, the next contest.

Anderson's campaign's performance in Wisconsin was considered a significant setback in, as he had unfruitfully hoped to sway enough crossover voting from Democrats to earn a strong finish in the state. By the time of the Wisconsin primary, many of his supporters had urged him to run on a third party ticket, but his inability in Wisconsin's primaries to draw large crossover votes from the Democratic side raised questions about whether he could appeal to a broad enough swath of voters to mount a well supported third party effort.

After Wisconsin, Bush and Anderson both pledged to continue their campaigns. However, the map and delegate math was unfavorable to Reagan's opponents. Many of the states yet to hold their contests were located in the Southwest and West, seen as favorable turf for the California-based Reagan.

Candidate	Votes	Delegates
Ronald Reagan	364,898	15
George H. W. Bush	276,164	11
John B. Anderson	248,623	10
Howard Baker	3,298	0
Others	9,919	0
Totals	902,902	37

== General election ==
=== Campaign ===
In the earliest polls in August, Reagan was well ahead of Carter. Independent candidate John B. Anderson, who had recently chosen former Badger State Governor Patrick Lucey as his running mate, was ahead of Carter in some normally Democratic districts of the state. Anderson was the first of the three leading candidates to campaign in the state, doing so alongside his running mate early in September, Reagan campaigned in the state during the first week of October, when he was ahead by 5 points in a recent poll, and argued that his tax cuts are necessary to aid business and an economy affected by stagflation. Carter would not campaign in Wisconsin until the second week of October, when he argued against Reagan’s nuclear and military arms positions, arguing that they could lead to interventions that were “jingoistic”, “macho” and “guided by a desire to push everybody around”.

In October, Reagan continued to lead in Wisconsin, although his lead fell as Anderson’s strength dropped below the 20 percent level where it had been during September. Wisconsin was ultimately won by Reagan and his running mate, former C.I.A. Director George H. W. Bush of Texas, against incumbent President Carter by 4.72 points. This was about what had been expected at the beginning of October. This result made Wisconsin almost 5% more Democratic than the nation-at-large.

=== Results ===
1980 United States presidential election in Wisconsin
Party	Candidate	Votes	Percentage	Electoral votes
Republican	Ronald Reagan	1,088,845	47.90%	11
Democratic	Jimmy Carter (incumbent)	981,584	43.18%	0
Independent	John B. Anderson	160,657	7.07%	0
Libertarian	Ed Clark	29,135	1.28%	0
Independent	Barry Commoner	7,767	0.34%	0
Constitution	John Rarick	1,519	0.07%	0
Write-Ins		1,337	0.06%	0
Independent	David McReynolds	808	0.04%	0
Independent	Gus Hall	772	0.03%	0
Independent	Deirdre Griswold	414	0.02%	0
Independent	Clifton DeBerry	383 (Note: The DeBerry votes were not separated by county but listed only as a state-wide total.)	0.02%	0
Totals		2,272,838	100.0%	11

==== Results by county ====
County	Ronald Reagan Republican		Jimmy Carter Democratic		John B. Anderson Independent		Ed Clark Libertarian		Barry Commoner Independent		Other candidates Various parties		Margin		Total votes cast
County	#	%	#	%	#	%	#	%	#	%	#	%	#	%	Total votes cast
Adams	3,304	50.69%	2,773	42.54%	318	4.88%	103	1.58%	8	0.12%	12	0.18%	531	8.15%	6,518
Ashland	3,262	37.56%	4,469	51.46%	685	7.89%	125	1.44%	108	1.24%	36	0.41%	-1,207	-13.90%	8,685
Barron	8,791	47.05%	8,654	46.32%	883	4.73%	287	1.54%	54	0.29%	16	0.09%	137	0.73%	18,685
Bayfield	3,278	42.08%	3,705	47.57%	554	7.11%	148	1.90%	87	1.12%	17	0.22%	-427	-5.49%	7,789
Brown	47,067	56.72%	29,796	35.91%	4,680	5.64%	1,127	1.36%	205	0.25%	102	0.12%	17,271	20.81%	82,977
Buffalo	3,569	48.11%	3,276	44.16%	404	5.45%	144	1.94%	17	0.23%	8	0.11%	293	3.95%	7,418
Burnett	3,027	44.81%	3,200	47.37%	393	5.82%	103	1.52%	24	0.36%	8	0.12%	-173	-2.56%	6,755
Calumet	7,885	55.17%	5,036	35.23%	1,064	7.44%	232	1.62%	13	0.09%	63	0.44%	2,849	19.94%	14,293
Chippewa	10,531	48.06%	9,836	44.89%	1,160	5.29%	332	1.52%	28	0.13%	25	0.11%	695	3.17%	21,912
Clark	7,921	52.73%	6,091	40.54%	679	4.52%	300	2.00%	16	0.11%	16	0.11%	1,830	12.19%	15,023
Columbia	10,478	49.90%	8,715	41.51%	1,373	6.54%	332	1.58%	48	0.23%	50	0.24%	1,763	8.39%	20,996
Crawford	3,934	50.08%	3,392	43.18%	371	4.72%	110	1.40%	39	0.50%	10	0.13%	542	6.90%	7,856
Dane	57,545	34.17%	85,609	50.84%	19,772	11.74%	2,216	1.32%	2,807	1.67%	456	0.27%	-28,064	-16.67%	168,405
Dodge	19,435	57.70%	11,966	35.53%	1,709	5.07%	484	1.44%	34	0.10%	54	0.16%	7,469	22.17%	33,682
Door	7,170	55.23%	4,961	38.21%	655	5.05%	154	1.19%	26	0.20%	16	0.12%	2,209	17.02%	12,982
Douglas	7,258	34.24%	11,703	55.21%	1,728	8.15%	400	1.89%	51	0.24%	59	0.28%	-4,445	-20.97%	21,199
Dunn	7,428	43.47%	7,743	45.31%	1,565	9.16%	235	1.38%	92	0.54%	25	0.15%	-315	-1.84%	17,088
Eau Claire	17,304	44.46%	17,602	45.22%	3,486	8.96%	389	1.00%	105	0.27%	36	0.09%	-298	-0.76%	38,922
Florence	1,187	52.52%	943	41.73%	86	3.81%	31	1.37%	6	0.27%	7	0.31%	244	10.79%	2,260
Fond du Lac	24,196	56.97%	15,293	36.01%	2,191	5.16%	668	1.57%	62	0.15%	60	0.14%	8,903	20.96%	42,470
Forest	2,070	44.29%	2,402	51.39%	141	3.02%	55	1.18%	3	0.06%	3	0.06%	-332	-7.10%	4,674
Grant	13,298	55.82%	8,406	35.28%	1,690	7.09%	368	1.54%	44	0.18%	18	0.08%	4,892	20.54%	23,824
Green	7,714	54.03%	5,336	37.37%	947	6.63%	245	1.72%	29	0.20%	6	0.04%	2,378	16.66%	14,277
Green Lake	5,868	63.42%	2,851	30.81%	368	3.98%	151	1.63%	7	0.08%	7	0.08%	3,017	32.61%	9,252
Iowa	4,068	45.24%	4,154	46.20%	546	6.07%	166	1.85%	48	0.53%	10	0.11%	-86	-0.96%	8,992
Iron	1,811	45.04%	1,941	48.27%	219	5.45%	39	0.97%	7	0.17%	4	0.10%	-130	-3.23%	4,021
Jackson	4,327	50.80%	3,629	42.61%	413	4.85%	115	1.35%	21	0.25%	12	0.14%	698	8.19%	8,517
Jefferson	16,174	53.91%	11,335	37.78%	1,925	6.42%	446	1.49%	59	0.20%	61	0.20%	4,839	16.13%	30,000
Juneau	5,591	55.14%	3,884	38.30%	463	4.57%	169	1.67%	15	0.15%	18	0.18%	1,707	16.84%	10,140
Kenosha	24,481	43.82%	26,738	47.86%	3,802	6.81%	684	1.22%	64	0.11%	94	0.17%	-2,257	-4.04%	55,863
Kewaunee	5,577	57.05%	3,706	37.91%	318	3.25%	147	1.50%	15	0.15%	12	0.12%	1,871	19.14%	9,775
La Crosse	23,427	51.73%	17,304	38.21%	3,652	8.06%	480	1.06%	371	0.82%	51	0.11%	6,123	13.52%	45,285
Lafayette	4,421	51.46%	3,598	41.88%	450	5.24%	107	1.25%	8	0.09%	7	0.08%	823	9.58%	8,591
Langlade	4,866	49.30%	4,498	45.57%	369	3.74%	112	1.13%	16	0.16%	10	0.10%	368	3.73%	9,871
Lincoln	6,473	50.75%	5,438	42.63%	630	4.94%	192	1.51%	13	0.10%	9	0.07%	1,035	8.12%	12,755
Manitowoc	18,591	48.00%	17,330	44.74%	2,014	5.20%	653	1.69%	51	0.13%	93	0.24%	1,261	3.26%	38,732
Marathon	25,868	48.34%	23,281	43.50%	3,257	6.09%	914	1.71%	102	0.19%	92	0.17%	2,587	4.84%	53,514
Marinette	10,444	54.49%	7,718	40.27%	683	3.56%	283	1.48%	22	0.11%	17	0.09%	2,726	14.22%	19,167
Marquette	3,166	54.78%	2,180	37.72%	270	4.67%	126	2.18%	10	0.17%	27	0.47%	986	17.06%	5,779
Menominee	302	32.26%	544	58.12%	57	6.09%	11	1.18%	6	0.64%	16	1.71%	-242	-25.86%	936
Milwaukee	183,450	39.54%	240,174	51.76%	34,281	7.39%	3,843	0.83%	1,105	0.24%	1,155	0.25%	-56,724	-12.22%	464,008
Monroe	8,136	51.87%	6,521	41.58%	780	4.97%	202	1.29%	33	0.21%	12	0.08%	1,615	10.29%	15,684
Oconto	8,292	58.01%	5,352	37.44%	440	3.08%	176	1.23%	20	0.14%	13	0.09%	2,940	20.57%	14,293
Oneida	8,602	51.19%	7,008	41.70%	832	4.95%	306	1.82%	40	0.24%	17	0.10%	1,594	9.49%	16,805
Outagamie	31,500	52.99%	21,284	35.81%	5,735	9.65%	749	1.26%	110	0.19%	63	0.11%	10,216	17.18%	59,441
Ozaukee	21,371	61.00%	10,779	30.77%	2,463	7.03%	347	0.99%	46	0.13%	27	0.08%	10,592	30.23%	35,033
Pepin	1,541	44.40%	1,673	48.20%	183	5.27%	54	1.56%	12	0.35%	8	0.23%	-132	-3.80%	3,471
Pierce	6,209	39.68%	7,312	46.73%	1,752	11.20%	293	1.87%	62	0.40%	18	0.12%	-1,103	-7.05%	15,646
Polk	7,207	44.23%	7,607	46.68%	1,102	6.76%	328	2.01%	35	0.21%	17	0.10%	-400	-2.45%	16,296
Portage	10,465	34.09%	16,443	53.56%	2,851	9.29%	463	1.51%	399	1.30%	81	0.26%	-5,978	-19.47%	30,702
Price	4,028	49.30%	3,595	44.00%	394	4.82%	125	1.53%	20	0.24%	9	0.11%	433	5.30%	8,171
Racine	39,683	49.76%	33,565	42.09%	5,167	6.48%	1,054	1.32%	114	0.14%	159	0.20%	6,118	7.67%	79,742
Richland	4,601	53.57%	3,413	39.74%	413	4.81%	132	1.54%	20	0.23%	9	0.10%	1,188	13.83%	8,588
Rock	30,960	50.60%	24,740	40.44%	4,408	7.20%	888	1.45%	116	0.19%	70	0.11%	6,220	10.16%	61,182
Rusk	3,704	47.52%	3,584	45.98%	340	4.36%	135	1.73%	22	0.28%	10	0.13%	120	1.54%	7,795
Sauk	9,992	49.48%	8,456	41.87%	1,405	6.96%	290	1.44%	43	0.21%	9	0.04%	1,536	7.61%	20,195
Sawyer	3,548	50.07%	3,065	43.25%	323	4.56%	125	1.76%	18	0.25%	7	0.10%	483	6.82%	7,086
Shawano	9,922	60.96%	5,410	33.24%	652	4.01%	232	1.43%	27	0.17%	33	0.20%	4,512	27.72%	16,276
Sheboygan	23,036	47.42%	20,974	43.18%	3,859	7.94%	588	1.21%	58	0.12%	60	0.12%	2,062	4.24%	48,575
St. Croix	9,265	42.56%	10,203	46.87%	1,867	8.58%	364	1.67%	50	0.23%	18	0.08%	-938	-4.31%	21,767
Taylor	4,596	51.31%	3,739	41.74%	403	4.50%	195	2.18%	18	0.20%	7	0.08%	857	9.57%	8,958
Trempealeau	5,992	49.52%	5,390	44.54%	558	4.61%	122	1.01%	30	0.25%	9	0.07%	602	4.98%	12,101
Vernon	6,528	51.11%	5,501	43.07%	494	3.87%	190	1.49%	44	0.34%	16	0.13%	1,027	8.04%	12,773
Vilas	6,034	60.80%	3,293	33.18%	421	4.24%	140	1.41%	24	0.24%	12	0.12%	2,741	27.62%	9,924
Walworth	19,194	56.90%	11,344	33.63%	2,581	7.65%	522	1.55%	58	0.17%	31	0.09%	7,850	23.27%	33,730
Washburn	3,193	46.41%	3,172	46.10%	355	5.16%	124	1.80%	35	0.51%	1	0.01%	21	0.31%	6,880
Washington	23,213	58.81%	12,944	32.79%	2,654	6.72%	561	1.42%	33	0.08%	66	0.17%	10,269	26.02%	39,471
Waukesha	81,059	58.25%	46,612	33.50%	9,778	7.03%	1,396	1.00%	149	0.11%	154	0.11%	34,447	24.75%	139,148
Waupaca	12,568	61.71%	6,401	31.43%	1,072	5.26%	268	1.32%	42	0.21%	15	0.07%	6,167	30.28%	20,366
Waushara	5,576	61.43%	2,987	32.91%	335	3.69%	141	1.55%	22	0.24%	16	0.18%	2,589	28.52%	9,077
Winnebago	34,286	53.28%	24,203	37.61%	4,779	7.43%	844	1.31%	137	0.21%	104	0.16%	10,083	15.67%	64,353
Wood	17,987	52.19%	13,804	40.05%	2,010	5.83%	555	1.61%	84	0.24%	27	0.08%	4,183	12.14%	34,467
Totals	1,088,845	47.90%	981,584	43.18%	160,657	7.07%	29,135	1.28%	7,767	0.34%	5,233	0.23%	107,261	4.72%	2,273,221

==== Counties that flipped from Democratic to Republican ====
- Adams
- Barron
- Buffalo
- Chippewa
- Clark
- Crawford
- Florence
- Jackson
- Lincoln
- Manitowoc
- Marathon
- Juneau
- Kewaunee
- Oconto
- Price
- Rusk
- Sawyer
- Sheboygan
- Taylor
- Trempealeau
- Washburn

== See also ==
- United States presidential elections in Wisconsin
