= John R. Meyer (legislator) =

American politician

John R. Meyer (July 17, 1930 – December 30, 2010) was an American physicist from Milwaukee, Wisconsin who served one term in the Wisconsin State Assembly as a Republican state representative.

== Background ==
Born in Milwaukee on July 17, 1930, to George L. N. and Edna (Zuerner) Meyer, Meyer attended Hartford Avenue School in Milwaukee, and then Milwaukee Country Day School. He earned a B.A. (1951) and M.A. (1952) at Harvard University. He was employed as a research physicist by Allis-Chalmers and served as a member of the executive committee of the Milwaukee 18th Ward Republican Club.

== Assembly ==
Meyer had held no public office until he was elected to the assembly in 1956 to represent the 18th Milwaukee County district (the 18th ward of the City of Milwaukee). After an easy victory in his party's primary (3,462 votes to 890 for Louis J. Ceci and 228 for Walter Sukowatey), he defeated Democrat Alfred Marcell by 8,567 to 7.504 in the general election (Democratic incumbent Ralph Landowski was not a candidate for reelection). He was assigned to the standing committee on taxation.

While he won his party primary in 1958 (he was perceived as a "liberal Republican" and opposed by Ida Mae Zimmerman, described as of the "Old Guard", whom he beat by over 2:1), he was defeated by Democrat Robert M. Curley by 6,846 to 5,318 in the general election.

== Personal life ==
After leaving the Assembly, he worked at one time for the United States Postal Service. For a while, he was married to Dr. Martine (Darmon) Meyer. He died December 30, 2010, in Sheboygan, Wisconsin after some years in an assisted living facility.
