= Robert M. Curley =

American politician and judge (1922–2001)

The Honorable Robert M. Curley

Wisconsin Circuit Court Judge for the Milwaukee Circuit, Branch 9
- In office August 1, 1978 – 1983
- Preceded by: Transitioned from 2nd Circuit
- Succeeded by: Russell W. Stamper, Sr.

Wisconsin Circuit Court Judge for the 2nd Circuit, Branch 9
- In office May 2, 1960 – July 31, 1978
- Appointed by: Gaylord Nelson
- Preceded by: William F. Shaughnessy
- Succeeded by: Transitioned to Milwaukee Circuit

Member of the Wisconsin State Assembly from the Milwaukee 18th district
- In office January 1, 1959 – April 23, 1960
- Preceded by: John R. Meyer
- Succeeded by: Michael J. Barron

Personal details
- Born: November 23, 1922 Milwaukee, Wisconsin
- Died: February 12, 2001 (aged 78) Indian Harbour Beach, Florida
- Resting place: Resurrection Cemetery; Mequon, Wisconsin
- Spouse: Mary Irene O'Rourke
- Children: Judge Patricia S. Curley; Robert Curley; William Curley; Michael Curley
- Education: University of Notre Dame; Marquette Law School (LL.B.)

Military service
- Allegiance: United States
- Branch/service: United States Navy; Navy Reserve
- Years of service: 1942–1946 (USN); 1946-1960 (USNR)
- Battles/wars: World War II

Robert M. Curley (November 23, 1922 – February 12, 2001) was an American politician and jurist. He was a Wisconsin circuit court judge for 23 years in Milwaukee County, and served one term in the Wisconsin State Assembly. His daughter, Patricia S. Curley, is a retired judge of the Wisconsin Court of Appeals.

== Biography ==
Born in Milwaukee, Wisconsin, Curley served in the United States Navy from 1942 through 1946, and remained in the United States Navy Reserve until 1960. He attended the University of Notre Dame and received his law degree from Marquette Law School, practicing law from 1948 in Wisconsin.

He was elected to the Wisconsin State Assembly in 1958 as a Democrat. He resigned from the Assembly in 1960 to accept appointment to the Wisconsin Circuit Court in Milwaukee County (then the 2nd Circuit). He retired from the court in 1983, but was able to serve for five years alongside his daughter, Patricia S. Curley, who had become a circuit court judge in Milwaukee in 1978.

Judge Curley married Mary Irene O'Rourke. In addition to their daughter, they had three sons.

Judge Curley died at Indian Harbour Beach, Florida.

== Electoral history ==
=== Wisconsin Assembly (1958) ===
Wisconsin Assembly, Milwaukee 18th District Election, 1958
Party	Candidate	Votes	%	±%
Primary Election, September 9, 1958
Republican	John R. Meyer (incumbent)	1,401	25.96%	
Democratic	Robert M. Curley	1,257	23.30%	
Democratic	Robert J. Brady	910	16.86%	
Republican	Ida Mae Zimmermann	629	11.66%	
Democratic	Alfred J. Marcell	477	8.84%	
Democratic	Rebecca B. Cohnstaedt	317	5.87%	
Democratic	Joseph F. Lindner	287	5.32%	
Democratic	Leon C. Alberty	118	2.19%	
Total votes		'3,304'	'100.0%'	
General Election, November 4, 1958
Democratic	Robert M. Curley	6,846	56.28%	
Republican	John R. Meyer (incumbent)	5,318	43.72%	
Total votes		'12,164'	'100.0%'	

=== Wisconsin Circuit Court (1963, 1969, 1975, 1981) ===
Wisconsin Circuit Court, 2nd Circuit, Branch 9 Election, 1963
Party	Candidate	Votes	%	±%
General Election, April 2, 1963
Nonpartisan	Robert M. Curley (incumbent)	77,774	100.0%	
Total votes		'77,774'	'100.0%'	

Wisconsin Circuit Court, 2nd Circuit, Branch 9 Election, 1969
Party	Candidate	Votes	%	±%
General Election, April 1, 1969
Nonpartisan	Robert M. Curley (incumbent)	108,116	100.0%	
Total votes		'108,116'	'100.0%'	+39.01%

Wisconsin Circuit Court, 2nd Circuit, Branch 9 Election, 1975
Party	Candidate	Votes	%	±%
General Election, April 1, 1975
Nonpartisan	Robert M. Curley (incumbent)	87,042	100.0%	
Total votes		'87,042'	'100.0%'	-19.49%

Wisconsin Circuit Court, Milwaukee Circuit, Branch 9 Election, 1981
Party	Candidate	Votes	%	±%
General Election, April 7, 1981
Nonpartisan	Robert M. Curley (incumbent)	68,776	100.0%	
Total votes		'68,776'	'100.0%'	-20.99%

== Notes ==
Legal offices
Preceded by William F. Shaughnessy	Wisconsin Circuit Court Judge for the 2nd Circuit, Branch 9; 1960 – 1978	Succeeded by Circuit abolished
Preceded by New circuit	Wisconsin Circuit Court Judge for the Milwaukee Circuit, Branch 9; 1978 – 1983	Succeeded by Russell W. Stamper, Sr.
