= Michael J. Barron =

20th-century American politician and judge

Chief Judge of the 1st District of Wisconsin Circuit Courts
- In office August 1, 1986 – July 31, 1990
- Preceded by: Victor Manian
- Succeeded by: Patrick T. Sheedy

Wisconsin Circuit Judge for the Milwaukee Circuit, Branch 8
- In office August 1, 1978 – August 31, 1999
- Preceded by: Transitioned from 2nd circ.
- Succeeded by: William Sosnay

Wisconsin Circuit Judge for the 2nd Circuit, Branch 8
- In office August 1, 1973 – July 31, 1978
- Preceded by: William I. O'Neill
- Succeeded by: Transitioned to Milwaukee circ.

Member of the Wisconsin State Assembly from the Milwaukee 18th district
- In office January 2, 1961 – January 4, 1965
- Preceded by: Robert M. Curley
- Succeeded by: Louis J. Ceci

Member of the Milwaukee County Board of Supervisors from the 18th district
- In office April 1964 – July 31, 1973

Personal details
- Born: December 18, 1933 Milwaukee, Wisconsin, U.S.
- Died: February 28, 2021 (aged 87) Shorewood, Wisconsin, U.S.
- Resting place: Holy Cross Cemetery, Milwaukee
- Party: Democratic
- Spouse: Mary Lu Bruns (m. 1962–2021)
- Children: 2
- Education: Milwaukee State College (B.S.); Marquette University (J.D.)
- Profession: Lawyer, judge

Michael Joseph Barron (December 18, 1933 – February 28, 2021) was an American lawyer, judge, and Democratic politician from Milwaukee, Wisconsin. He served four years as chief judge of the 1st district of Wisconsin circuit courts, and served a total of 26 years as a circuit judge in Milwaukee County. Earlier in life, he also served two terms in the Wisconsin State Assembly (1961, 1963), representing part of northeast Milwaukee, and was a member of the Milwaukee County Board of Supervisors from 1964 until 1973.

== Early life and education ==
Michael J. Barron was born on December 18, 1933, in Milwaukee, Wisconsin. He was raised and educated in Milwaukee, graduating from St. John's Cathedral High School. He went on to attend Milwaukee State College (now University of Wisconsin–Milwaukee), where he was president of the student body. He received his bachelor's degree in 1956, and immediately continued his education at Marquette University Law School, where he earned his J.D. in 1959.

== Political and judicial careers ==
After being admitted to the bar, he went to work as an attorney in partnership with Robert M. Curley and Patrick Sheedy. He also quickly became involved in politics, as Curley was then-serving as a member of the Wisconsin State Assembly. In 1960, Curley was elected a Wisconsin circuit judge and Barron then stepped in to run for his former seat in the Assembly. He prevailed in the three-person Democratic Party primary, receiving 60% of the vote, and went on to win the general election with 61%. He represented Milwaukee County's 18th district, which was defined by what was then the 18th ward of the city of Milwaukee. He was re-elected in 1962.

During both of his terms in the Assembly, he served on the Assembly Judiciary Committee and the Legislative Council Judiciary Committee. During his second term, he also served on the Assembly Transportation Committee.

Rather than running for another term in 1964, Barron was elected to the Milwaukee County Board of Supervisors in the 1964 Spring election. He was re-elected several times, and served on the board until his election as a Wisconsin circuit court judge in 1973. In that election, he defeated attorney Clarence Parrish with 60% of the vote. As circuit judge, he never faced another contested election and was re-elected without opposition in 1979, 1986, 1992, and 1998. He was chosen by the Wisconsin Supreme Court as chief judge of the 1st district of Wisconsin Circuit Courts in 1986, and was re-appointed in 1988. The Supreme Court chose not to re-appoint him in 1990, hoping a different chief judge would do a better job raising funds for court operations. He was ultimately replaced as chief judge by his former law partner, Patrick Sheedy.

Barron served another decade as a circuit judge and retired in 1999. He continued to serve for most of the rest of his life as a reserve judge; he was chairman of the Wisconsin Reserve Judges' Association for over ten years and handled more than 500 arbitrations and mediations during those years.

== Personal life and family ==
Michael J. Barron married Mary Lu Bruns of Sheboygan, Wisconsin, in July 1962. They had two daughters together and were married for 58 years before his death on February 28, 2021. He was interred at Milwaukee's Holy Cross Cemetery.

Barron was extremely active in the Milwaukee community; he was a member of the Marquette Law School Board of Trustees, president of the Milwaukee Convention & Visitors Bureau, and president of the UWM Alumni Association.

In addition to his service in public and civic offices, Barron was a devout Catholic, and was a member of the Society of the Holy Name and the Benevolent and Protective Order of Elks.

== Electoral history ==
=== Wisconsin Assembly (1960, 1962) ===
Wisconsin Assembly, Milwaukee 18th District Election, 1960
Party	Candidate	Votes	%	±%
Democratic Primary, September 13, 1960
Democratic	Michael J. Barron	2,636	59.96%	
Democratic	Robert J. Brady	1,348	30.66%	
Democratic	Joseph F. Lindner	412	9.37%	
Plurality		1,288	29.30%	
Total votes		4,396	100.0%	
General Election, November 8, 1960
Democratic	Michael J. Barron	9,878	61.36%	+5.08%
Republican	Robert D. Heckel	6,221	38.64%	
Plurality		3,657	22.72%	+10.15%
Total votes		16,099	100.0%	+32.35%
Democratic hold				

Wisconsin Assembly, Milwaukee 18th District Election, 1962
Party	Candidate	Votes	%	±%
General Election, November 6, 1962
Democratic	Michael J. Barron (incumbent)	7,341	61.76%	+0.40%
Republican	F. Paul D'Amore	4,546	38.24%	
Plurality		2,795	23.51%	+0.80%
Total votes		11,887	100.0%	-26.16%
Democratic hold				

=== Wisconsin Circuit Courts (1973) ===
Wisconsin Circuit Courts, 1st Circuit, Branch 8 Election, 1973
Party	Candidate	Votes	%	±%
General Election, April 3, 1973
Nonpartisan	Michael J. Barron	119,630	59.73%	
Nonpartisan	Clarence Parrish	80,649	40.27%	
Plurality		38,981	19.46%	
Total votes		200,279	100.0%	

Wisconsin State Assembly
Preceded by Robert M. Curley	Member of the Wisconsin State Assembly from the Milwaukee 18th district January 2, 1961 – January 4, 1965	Succeeded by Louis J. Ceci
Legal offices
Preceded by William I. O'Neill	Wisconsin Circuit Judge for the 2nd Circuit, Branch 8 August 1, 1973 – July 31, 1978	Circuit abolished
New circuit	Wisconsin Circuit Judge for the Milwaukee Circuit, Branch 8 August 1, 1978 – August 31, 1999	Succeeded by William Sosnay
Preceded by Victor Manian	Chief Judge of the 1st District of Wisconsin Circuit Courts; August 1, 1986 – July 31, 1990	Succeeded by Patrick T. Sheedy
