= 1980 Wisconsin Supreme Court election =

- April 1, 1980

Candidate	Donald W. Steinmetz	Louis J. Ceci
Popular vote	663,378	658,605
Percentage	50.18%	49.82
- Steinmetz: 50–60% 60–70% Ceci: 50–60% 60–70%
Justice before election
Connor Hansen
Elected Justice
Donald W. Steinmetz

The 1980 Wisconsin Supreme Court election was held on April 1, 1980, to elect a justice to the Wisconsin Supreme Court for a ten-year term. Incumbent justice Connor Hansen did not seek re-election. Donald W. Steinmetz narrowly defeated Louis J. Ceci in the general election. Preceding the general election was a nonpartisan primary held on February 19, in which the two had advanced from over P. Charles Jones.

== Primary election ==
=== Candidates ===
==== Advanced ====
- Louis J. Ceci, Milwaukee County circuit court judge
- Donald W. Steinmetz, Milwaukee County circuit court judge

==== Eliminated in primary ====
- P. Charles Jones, Dane County circuit court judge

== Result ==
The general election result was very narrow. As of 2026, no subsequent election the court has been won by a narrower vote-share.

The general election coincided with the presidential primaries in Wisconsin.

1980 Wisconsin Supreme Court election
Party	Candidate	Votes	%	±%
Nonpartisan primary (February 19, 1980)
Nonpartisan	Louis J. Ceci	142,702	46.15	
Nonpartisan	Donald W. Steinmetz	90,286	29.20	
Nonpartisan	P. Charles Jones	76,253	24.66	
Total votes		309,241	100	
General election (April 1, 1980)
Nonpartisan	Donald W. Steinmetz	663,378	50.18	
Nonpartisan	Louis J. Ceci	658,605	49.82	
Majority		4,773	0.36	−29.89
Total votes		1,321,983	100	+57.39
