= 1968 Wisconsin Supreme Court election =

- April 2, 1968
Candidate	Leo B. Hanley
Popular vote	884,421
Percentage	unopposed
- County results Hanley: >90%
Justice before election
Leo B. Hanley
Elected Justice
Leo B. Hanley

The 1968 Wisconsin Supreme Court election was held on Tuesday, April 2, 1968 to elect a justice to a full ten-year seat the Wisconsin Supreme Court. Incumbent justice Leo B. Hanley (appointed to fill a vacancy) was relected to a ten-year term, unopposed.

== Result ==
1968 Wisconsin Supreme Court election
Party	Candidate	Votes	%
General election (April 15, 1968)
Nonpartisan	Leo B. Hanley (incumbent)	884,421	unopposed
