= John Louis Coffey =

American judge (1922–2012)

- Coffey (center) with President Ronald Reagan (left) in the Oval Office in 1982

Senior Judge of the United States Court of Appeals for the Seventh Circuit
- In office July 2, 2004 – November 10, 2012

Judge of the United States Court of Appeals for the Seventh Circuit
- In office March 19, 1982 – July 2, 2004
- Appointed by: Ronald Reagan
- Preceded by: Thomas E. Fairchild
- Succeeded by: Diane S. Sykes

Justice of the Wisconsin Supreme Court
- In office August 1, 1978 – March 25, 1982
- Preceded by: Leo B. Hanley
- Succeeded by: Louis J. Ceci

Wisconsin Circuit Judge for the 2nd Circuit, Branch 12
- In office January 1, 1962 – July 31, 1978
- Preceded by: Branch established
- Succeeded by: Circuit abolished

Personal details
- Born: John Louis Coffey; April 15, 1922 Milwaukee, Wisconsin
- Died: November 10, 2012 (aged 90) Whitefish Bay, Wisconsin, U.S.
- Resting place: Resurrection Cemetery and Mausoleum, Mequon, Wisconsin
- Education: Marquette University (BA, JD)
- Profession: Lawyer, jurist

Military service
- Allegiance: United States
- Branch/service: United States Navy
- Years of service: 1943–1946
- Battles/wars: World War II

John Louis Coffey (April 15, 1922 – November 10, 2012) was an American lawyer and jurist from Milwaukee County, Wisconsin. He served as a judge of the 7th Circuit U.S. Court of Appeals from 1982 until his death, taking senior status in 2004. Prior to his federal appointment, he served four years as a justice of the Wisconsin Supreme Court, and 16 years as a Wisconsin circuit court judge in Milwaukee County.

== Education and career ==
Coffey was born in Milwaukee, Wisconsin, and graduated from the Marquette University High School in 1939. He received a Bachelor of Arts degree from Marquette University in 1943 and was in the United States Navy during World War II, from 1943 to 1946. He received a Juris Doctor from Marquette University Law School in 1948. He was an assistant city attorney for the city of Milwaukee from 1949 to 1954.

Coffey was a judge for Milwaukee County, Wisconsin, first as a Civil Court judge from 1954 to 1960, then as a Municipal Court judge from 1960 to 1962, and then as a Circuit Court judge from 1962 to 1978. He was the senior judge of the Criminal Division from 1972 to 1975, and chief presiding judge of the Criminal Division in 1976, switching to the civil division from 1976 to 1978. Coffey was a justice of the Wisconsin Supreme Court from 1978 to 1982.

== Federal judicial service ==
On February 19, 1982, Coffey was nominated by President Ronald Reagan to a seat on the United States Court of Appeals for the Seventh Circuit vacated by Judge Thomas E. Fairchild. Coffey was confirmed by the United States Senate on March 18, 1982, and received his commission the following day. He assumed senior status on July 2, 2004, and took inactive senior status on January 1, 2012.

He died, aged 90, on November 10, 2012.

Legal offices
Branch established	Wisconsin Circuit Judge for the 2nd Circuit, Branch 12; 1962–1978	Circuit abolished
Preceded by Leo B. Hanley	Justice of the Wisconsin Supreme Court; 1978–1982	Succeeded by Louis J. Ceci
Preceded by Thomas E. Fairchild	Judge of the United States Court of Appeals for the Seventh Circuit; 1982–2004	Succeeded by Diane S. Sykes
