= USS PC-1181 =

PC 461 class submarine

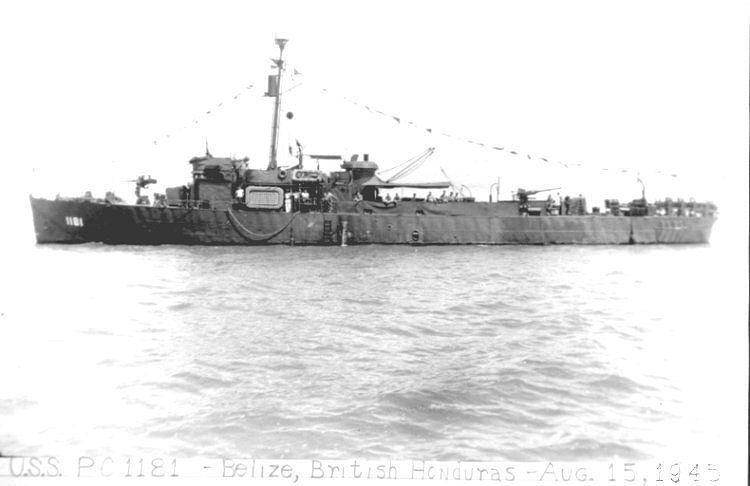
- USS PC-1181 off the coast of Belize, British Honduras before being decommissioned and named Wildwood

History

United States
- Name: USS PC-1181
- Builder: Gibbs Gas Engine Co., Jacksonville, Florida
- Cost: $1,600,000
- Laid down: 5 October 1942
- Launched: 15 April 1943
- Commissioned: 17 September 1943
- Decommissioned: 18 August 1946
- Renamed: 15 February 1956
- Stricken: 1 April 1959
- Fate: Sold for scrap

General characteristics
- Class & type: PC-461-class submarine chaser
- Displacement: 280 tons (light), 295 tons (full)
- Length: 175 feet (53 meters)
- Beam: 23 feet (7.0 meters)
- Draft: 10 feet 10 inches (3.30 meters)
- Installed power: 2 × Buda 844 six-cylinder diesels powering 60 KW — 120 volt DC generators
- Propulsion: 2 × Hamilton R-99DA diesel engines
- Speed: 20 knots
- Endurance: 3,000 nautical miles @ 12 knots (5,600 km @ 22 km/h)
- Complement: 6 officers, 53 enlisted
- Armament: 1 × 3 in (76 mm)/50 cal; 1 × 40 mm gun; 3 × 20 mm cannons; 2 × depth charge throwers; 2 × depth charge tracks

USS PC-1181 was a PC-461-class submarine chaser built for the United States Navy during World War II. She was later renamed Wildwood (PC-1181) but never saw active service under that name.

== Career ==
PC-1181 was laid down on 5 October 1942 at Gibbs Gas Engine Co. in Jacksonville, Florida and launched on 15 April 1943. She was commissioned as USS PC-1181 on 17 September 1943 at Charleston Navy Yard in Charleston, South Carolina. She was decommissioned on 18 August 1946 and given the name Wildwood on 15 February 1956. She was never recommissioned and therefore did not have the USS prefix to her name while she was named Wildwood. She was struck from the Navy Register on 1 April 1956 and sold for scrap.

USS PC-1181 was fitted out at the Charleston Navy Yard and then reported for shakedown training out of Miami, Florida and later sonar and antisubmarine warfare training at the Fleet Sonar School at Key West.

With her training complete, USS PC-1181 set out from Key West to escort Convoy KN-275 to New York City on 6 November 1943. The convoy successfully arrived on 11 November, Armistice Day.

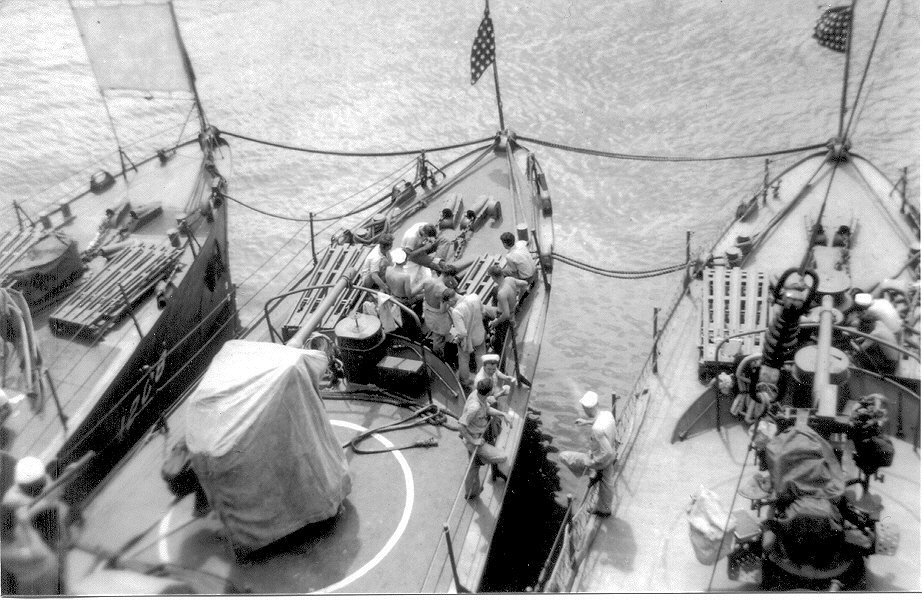
USS PC-1181 moored in between USS PC-1208 (left) and USS PC-1182 (right) in the Panama Canal.

The following week on 19 November, PC-1181 was charged with escorting Convoy NG-399 to Guantanamo Bay, Cuba. One day out she suffered an oil leak and was put into Norfolk, Virginia to undergo repairs. The convoy proceeded without her. Two days later, with repairs completed, USS PC-1181 resumed course and rejoined the convoy before it reached Guantanamo Bay on 27 November.

On 30 November PC-1181 set sail for New York with Convoy GN-99, reaching her destination on 6 December. She quickly set out to sea again, escorting Convoy NG-404 to Guantanamo Bay. She was tasked with breaking away from the convoy to escort a lagging merchant who had fallen behind from the rest of the convoy. PC-1181 didn't reach her destination until 20 December.

PC-1181 set sail for New York once again on Christmas Day and arrived on New Year's Day, 1944. On 6 January, she set out with Convoy NG-409 to Guantanamo Bay, but once again broke away to stand by a disabled merchant ship, SS Beta which had developed engine problems. After the merchant ship repaired her engines, both ships set course to rejoin the convoy. At 2132 hours on 12 January, PC-1181's sonar operators picked up a contact and began search operations. However, another submarine chaser, PC-618 picked up an even stronger contact and PC-1181 was called off her search to assist PC-618 in her search. The search returned no results and both ships broke off the search to return to the convoy, completing the voyage on 15 January.

PC-1181 continued escorting convoys between New York City and Guantanamo Bay. Her area of operation expanded to include convoys from Guantanamo Bay to the Panama Canal in May 1944. As the war in the Atlantic and Europe drew to a close in the spring of 1945, the convoy system was disbanded as the need for military escorts became obsolete.

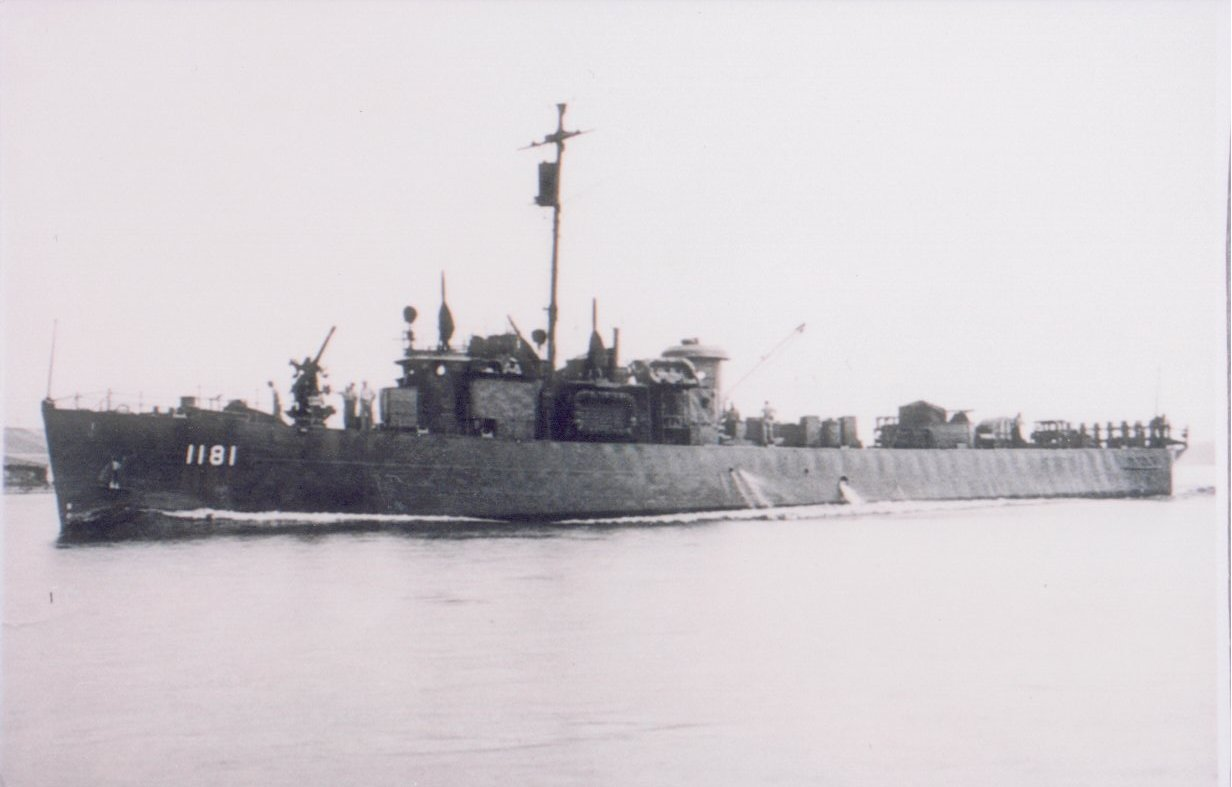
USS PC-1181 pumping out bilge water.

With the convoy system no longer needed, PC-1181 was reassigned to Submarine Squadron 3, serving as a target vessel during training missions for submarines operating in the Gulf of Mexico out of Panama. She continued operating in the gulf until the war with Japan ended in August 1945. With the war over, PC-1181 was reassigned to the defense forces of the Panama Canal. She conducted patrols and training operations out of Panama until June 1946. She was ordered back to Key West, arriving there on 13 July. She was later decommissioned there on 18 August 1946.

As a decommissioned ship, PC-1181 served as a training ship for the Naval Reserve units in Key West and St. Petersburg, Florida, until 1950 when she was placed in reserve at Brownsville, Texas. Later, she was shifted to the Atlantic Reserve Fleet's berthing area at Norfolk, Virginia and was named Wildwood on 15 February 1956. She was never commissioned as Wildwood. She was struck from the Navy Register on 1 April 1959 and sold for scrap.
