= General Daly =

General Daly may refer to:

- Edward M. Daly (born 1965), U.S. Army four-star general
- Henry Daly (1823–1895), British Indian Army general
- Paddy Daly (1888–1957), Irish National Army major general
- Thomas Daly (general) (1913–2004), Australian Army lieutenant general

== See also ==
- Dell L. Dailey (born 1949), U.S. Army lieutenant general
- John R. Dailey (born 1934), U.S. Marine Corps four-star general
- General Daily, Malayalam newspaper
- James P. Daley (fl. 1960s–2000s), U.S. National Guard brigadier general
