= Joseph D. Kearney =

American law school dean

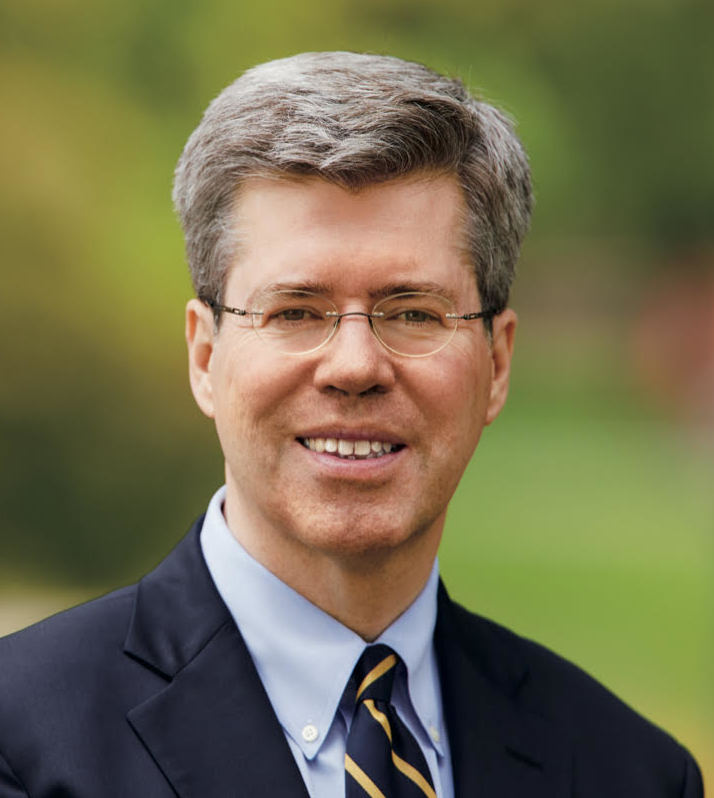

Personal details
- Born: Chicago, Illinois, U.S.
- Education: Yale University (BA); Harvard University (JD)

Academic work
- Sub-discipline: Civil Litigation; Appellate Practice
- Institutions: Marquette University; Law School

Joseph Dinneen Kearney is Dean and Professor of Law at Marquette University Law School in Milwaukee, Wisconsin. He is a scholar of civil litigation practice and procedure.

== Biography ==
Kearney graduated valedictorian at St. Ignatius College Prep and graduated Phi Beta Kappa from Yale University in 1986 with a B.A. degree in classics. He then went to Harvard Law School, where he was an editor of the Harvard Journal of Law and Public Policy. His 3L thesis was a study of the recusal of judges in medieval Europe. After graduation, he clerked for Judge Diarmuid O'Scannlain of the U.S. Court of Appeals for the Ninth Circuit, and then began practicing in the litigation department of Sidley Austin's Chicago office. He left Sidley for one year to serve as a law clerk for Justice Antonin Scalia of the United States Supreme Court for the October 1995 term.

Kearney has been a professor at the law school since 1997. He teaches courses in civil procedure and appellate practice, and his research focuses on regulated industries law.

Appointed as the ninth dean of Marquette Law School in 2003, Kearney leads a full-time faculty of 45 and a student body of 750. In addition to teaching a class and administering the school, Kearney fundraises frequently for Eckstein Hall, the law school's new, $85 million home. Father Robert Wild, S.J., the former president of the university secured a $51 million gift from Ray and Kay Eckstein for the project.

== Selected publications ==
- Lakefront: Public Trust and Private Rights in Chicago (Cornell University Press 2021) (with Thomas W. Merrill)
- The Origins of the American Public Trust Doctrine: What Really Happened in the Illinois Central Case (with Thomas W. Merrill), 71 University of Chicago Law Review 799 (2004)
- The Print Media and Judicial Elections: Some Case Studies from Wisconsin (with Howard B. Eisenberg), 85 Marquette Law Review 593 (2002)
- Will the FCC Go the Way of the ICC?, 71 University of Colorado Law Review 1153 (2000)
- The Influence of Amicus Curiae Briefs on the Supreme Court (with Thomas W. Merrill), 148 University of Pennsylvania Law Review 743 (2000)
- From the Fall of the Bell System to the Telecommunications Act: Regulation of Telecommunications Under Judge Greene, 50 Hastings Law Journal 1395 (1999)
- The Great Transformation of Regulated Industries Law (with Thomas W. Merrill), 98 Columbia Law Review 1323 (1998)

== See also ==
- List of law clerks for the ninth seat of the Supreme Court of the United States
