= Negotiation ethics =

Negotiation ethics is a legal term meaning "refraining from making fraudulent misrepresentations".

== The Ethics of Deception in Negotiation ==
One key ethical dilemma in negotiation is the use of deception. Research indicates that negotiators often justify misleading statements or withholding information as a strategic necessity rather than unethical behavior. According to Richard Shell (1991), negotiators frequently rationalize deception when they believe it serves a greater good or aligns with their competitive goals. However, ethical negotiation frameworks emphasize transparency and trust-building as essential for long-term success in business and diplomacy.

== Description ==
A 2004 article in the Marquette Law Review indicated that negotiating ethics had developed from an individual merely knowing the minimal legal threshold of acceptable behavior, to individuals being more aware that interests can be best understood in a wide perspective of ethical behavioral over the long term.

This basis of negotiation introduces not only a moral argument, but also introduces a case for the utilitarianism movement. Respect lies deep within the foundation of this school of thought concerning ethical negotiation. The authors propose that the negotiator does the right thing, even interpreting more ambivalent ethical questions conservatively; not because of the attractiveness of potential short-or long-term payoffs, but simply because the other party deserves to be treated with respect and not instrumentalized as a means to one’s own better negotiation results.

For many professional negotiators, the idea of being ethical during a negotiation is a dangerous minefield leading through an impossible feat, not meant to be accomplished. Many of these negotiators feel that negotiation ethics create a weak negotiation because it "encourages parties to disclose information to each other and develop a degree of trust, in contrast to the adversarial posture of traditional positional bargaining". This expression of trust is contrary to the hard-tactic negotiations displayed by so many in the business world today. The thought of mutual benefit is dissipated, while the greed for gain over another grows rampantly.

The moral minimum for negotiating ethics consists of interests of well-being, autonomy, political freedom, standard social roles, and focal interests.

Although the aggression and competition of gamesmanship may lead to short-term gains, it has two major drawbacks in an interest-based environment. The first issue with gamesmanship is that reputation counts, so that any immediate benefit will be negated by the inefficiencies imposed by distrust and the opportunity costs of foregone future transactions.

When one displays unethical behavior in negotiation settings, painful consequences may possibly arise. According to research, done by Ma and Parks, those who choose to engage in unethical negotiations increase the likelihood for reputational risk.

Research has demonstrated that college students who described having an ethical role model were less likely to adopt questionable ethical behavior in negotiation situations. Bandura notes that "the standards acquired through modeling are affected by variations in the judgments displayed by the same model over time and by discrepancies between what models practice and what they preach.

Ethical Challenges in Negotiation

Negotiators frequently make small ethical choices throughout the process, whether in disclosing or withholding information, framing their arguments, or handling difficult questions. Some common ethical dilemmas include:

- Truthfulness: Should a negotiator disclose weaknesses, or can they selectively present information?
- Misrepresentation: Is exaggerating a position justifiable, or does it constitute lying?
- Fairness vs. Self-Interest: How much should one prioritize fairness over personal or organizational gains?

Ethical negotiation requires self-awareness and intentional decision-making to ensure that short-term advantages do not compromise long-term credibility and trust.

2. The Temptation to Deceive and How to Avoid It

Deception is a major ethical issue in negotiation. Research shows that:

- Negotiators may feel pressured to mislead others when stakes are high.
- Uncertainty about the other party’s intentions can lead to defensive deception (lying to avoid being taken advantage of).
- People are more likely to justify small lies to themselves if they believe the other party is doing the same.

Strategies to Avoid Deception:

- Focus on Relationships: Long-term business relationships thrive on trust, making deception counterproductive.
- Consider Reputation Risks: Ethical lapses can harm one's career or organizational standing.
- Prepare Alternatives (BATNA):Having backup options reduces pressure to resort to unethical tactics.
- Encourage Transparency: Setting clear expectations early in the negotiation minimizes the need for misrepresentation.

3. Principles for Ethical Negotiation

Harvard experts outline key principles that promote ethical negotiation:

A. Take Time to Think

- Ethical violations often occur in rushed decision-making.
- Reflecting on the long-term consequences of a choice helps ensure fair outcomes.

B. Follow Abstract Ethical Principles

- Instead of focusing on immediate gains, negotiators should align their choices with core values like honesty, fairness, and integrity.
- Framing decisions as moral choices rather than just business strategies can prevent unethical behaviour.

C. Reduce Situational Pressures

- Time pressure and financial incentives often push people toward unethical actions.
- When negotiators have viable alternatives, they are less likely to resort to deception.

4. Avoiding Complicity in Wrongdoing

Ethical negotiation is not just about personal behaviour but also about responding to unethical behaviour from others. If a negotiating partner engages in dishonesty or unfair tactics, ignoring or tolerating it makes one complicit.

How to Handle Unethical Behaviour in Others:

- Call it out diplomatically: Address concerns without escalating conflict.
- Reframe the conversation: Shift focus to mutual benefits instead of adversarial tactics.
- Set ethical ground rules: Establishing ethical expectations early discourages unethical behaviour.

Ignoring unethical conduct can harm one's reputation and credibility in professional settings.

5. How to Foster Ethical Behaviour in Negotiation

To encourage honesty and integrity in negotiations, organizations and individuals can implement the following strategies:

- Create a Culture of Ethics: Organizations should promote ethical training and reward integrity over short-term success.
- Use Ethical Contracts: Clear contractual agreements discourage unethical behaviour.
- Rest and Self-Regulation: Studies suggest that fatigue increases dishonesty: ensuring adequate rest can promote ethical decision-making.

https://www.pon.harvard.edu/tag/ethics-in-negotiation/
