= Marquette University Law School =

Private law school in Milwaukee, Wisconsin, US

Coordinates: 43.036917°N 87.927125°W

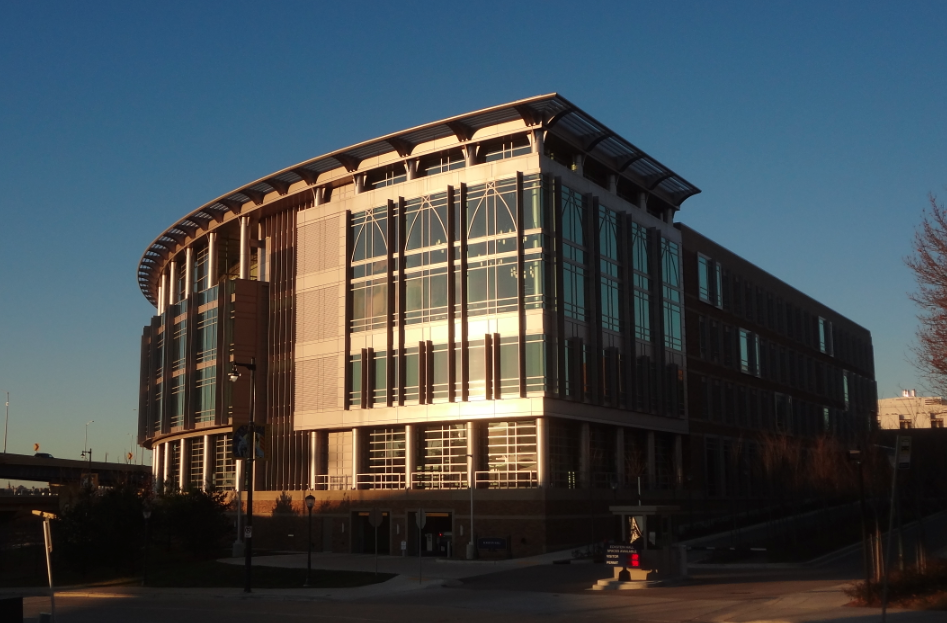
- Established: 1892
- School type: Private; Catholic, Jesuit
- Dean: Joseph D. Kearney
- Location: Milwaukee, Wisconsin, USA
- Enrollment: 575
- Faculty: 91
- USNWR ranking: 59th (tie) (2026)
- Website: law.marquette.edu
- ABA profile

Marquette University Law School is the law school of Marquette University in Milwaukee, Wisconsin. It is one of two law schools in Wisconsin and the only private law school in the state. Founded in 1892 as the Milwaukee Law Class, MULS is housed in Eckstein Hall on Marquette University's campus in downtown Milwaukee.

== Overview ==
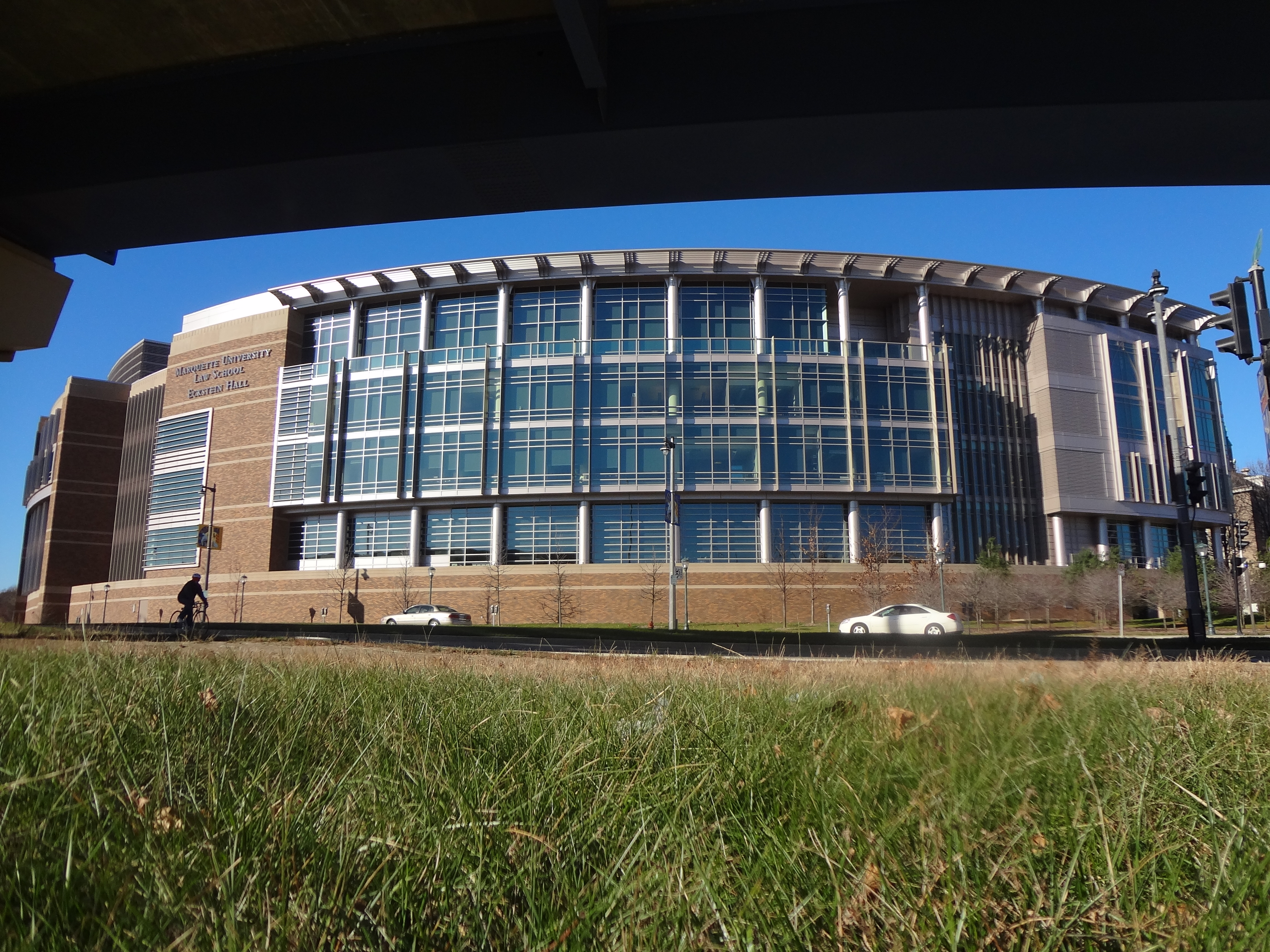
Marquette University Law School, MU Interchange

Marquette University is a Catholic institution operated by the Jesuit order. The law school's mission includes a commitment to the Jesuit idea of cura personalis ("care of the entire person"), a duty to promote diversity, and a goal of encouraging its "students to become agents for positive change in society."

As of the 2016–17 academic year, the school has 575 enrolled students and 98 faculty members and administrators, including 30 full-time faculty members, 10 "deans, librarians, and others who teach," and 58 part-time faculty members. For the fall 2016 entering J.D. class, there were 190 enrolled students (182 full-time and 8 part-time).

Wisconsin, unique among American states, allows graduates of accredited law schools within the state to be admitted to the Wisconsin state bar without taking the state's bar examination if they complete certain requirements in their law school courses and achieve a certain level of performance in those courses, a practice known as the "diploma privilege."

== History ==
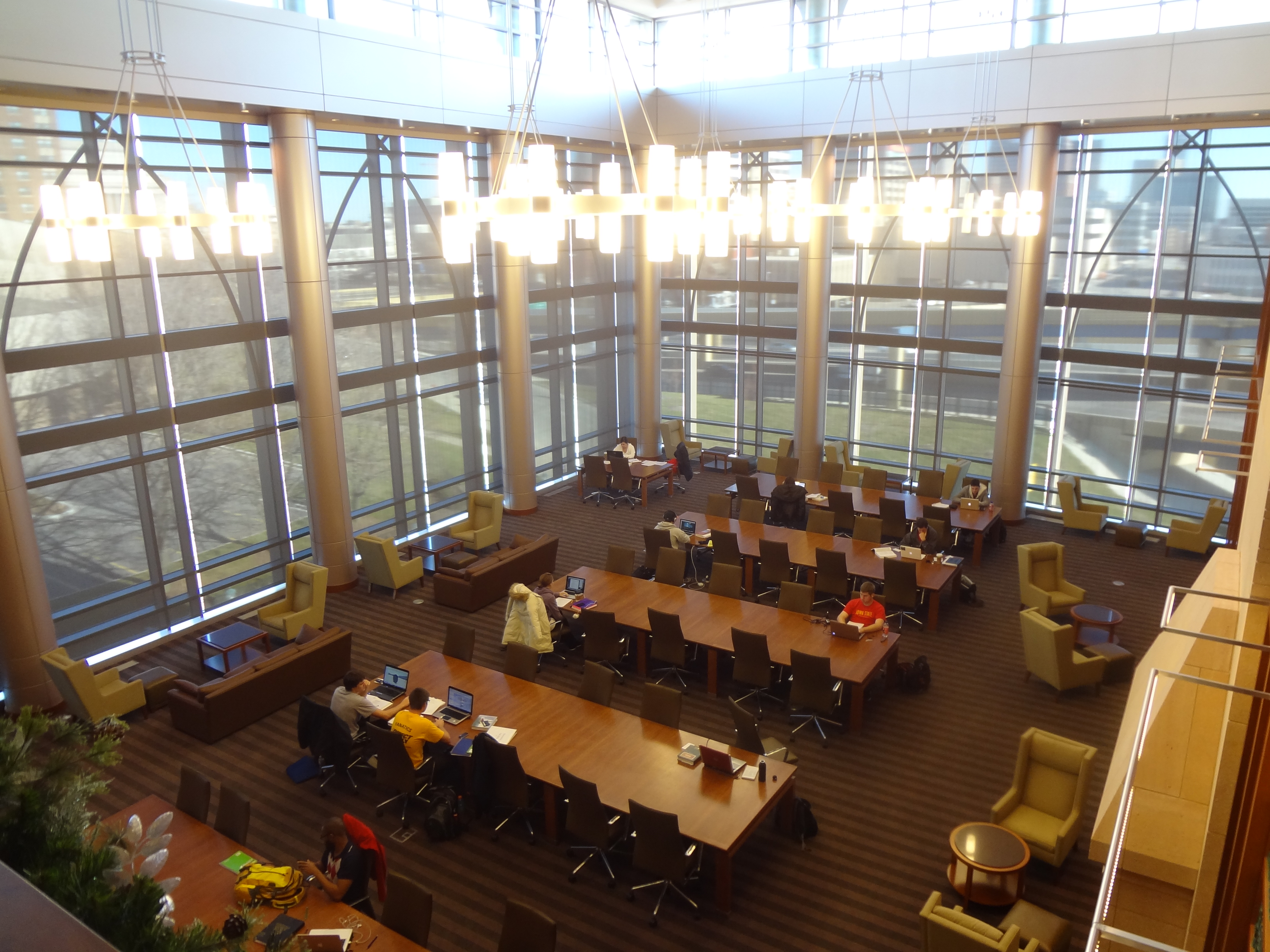
Aitken Reading Room

Marquette University Law School was born out of Marquette University's 1908 acquisition of the Milwaukee Law Class and the Milwaukee University Law School. First known as the Marquette University College of Law, the school added a day division to the two predecessors' evening programs. The first dean was James Graham Jenkins, a retired judge of the United States Court of Appeals for the Seventh Circuit. In 1916, the first edition of the Marquette Law Review was published, and in 1923, the college's name was changed to Marquette University Law School. A year later, the school moved into Sensenbrenner Hall. A law review article at the time described the building's interior: "four large lecture rooms and a large Moot Court room" and a "third floor [to] be occupied entirely by the library capable of holding 50,000 volumes." The law school became a member of the Association of American Law Schools in 1912 and received American Bar Association approval in 1925. The evening program was suspended in 1924 as part of the accreditation process, and was not restored for decades.

It was under Dean Robert Boden that the modern law school emerged. He took over as acting dean in June 1965, and served as dean until his death in 1984. During those nearly 20 years, the size of the full-time faculty tripled, the student body nearly doubled, and the law library doubled the size of its collection. Boden also oversaw a significant increase in the physical plant of the law school, making two major additions to Sensenbrenner Hall. Moreover, in January 1968, the law library moved into the newly constructed Legal Research Center, appended to the west side of Sensenbrenner Hall. The move was managed by Professor Mary Alice Hohmann, the first woman to teach a law course at MULS.

In fall 2010, the school moved into the new Eckstein Hall. The school also recently received the two largest gifts in its history: $51 million from alumni Ray and Kay Eckstein for Eckstein Hall, and $30 million from real estate developer Joseph Zilber, the bulk of which will endow scholarships. Supreme Court Associate Justice Antonin Scalia spoke at the September 8, 2010 dedication ceremony.

== Facilities ==
In September 2010, the Law School opened $85 million Eckstein Hall in downtown Milwaukee. The building was largely funded by donations from Ray and Kay Eckstein, Joseph Zilber, Wylie A. Aitken, and the Bradley Foundation. Zilber and Sheldon Lubar contributed provided funding for scholarships, research and other law school programs.

Eckstein Hall is located on the eastern end of the Marquette campus, two blocks from the Milwaukee County Courthouse and a mile from the Federal Courthouse. At 200,000 square feet, the building is four stories tall. It includes a four-story "library without borders," two mock courtrooms, a four-story atrium (the Zilber Forum), a cafeteria, a workout facility, a conference center, classrooms and faculty offices. The classrooms were all designed as "smart classrooms" with projectors, cameras, audio recording, and individual microphones built into classroom seating.

== Academics ==
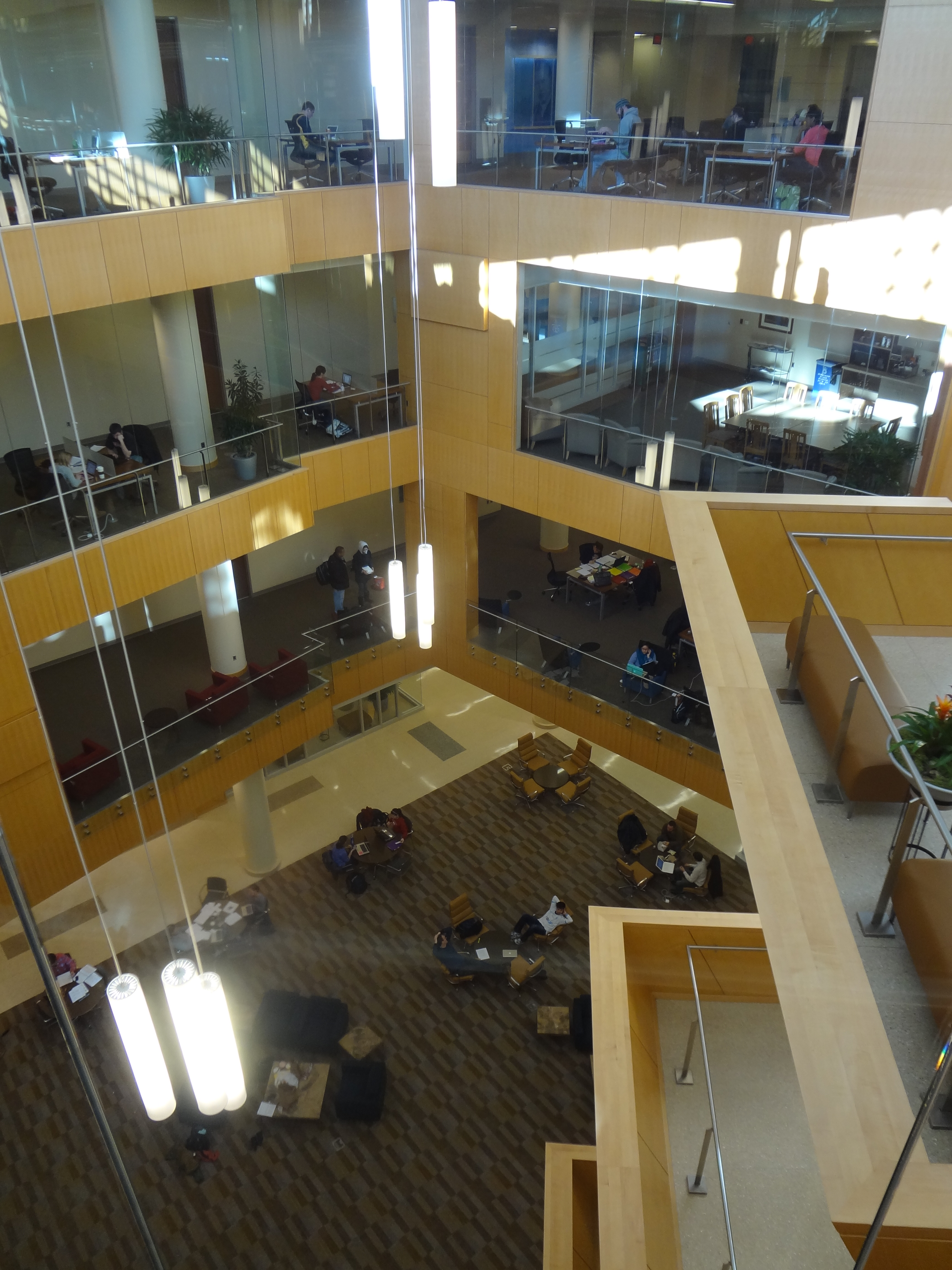
Fourth Floor of Eckstein Hall

Marquette University Law School offers two degrees, the Juris Doctor (J.D.), the largest program, and the LL.M in Sports Law program, for foreign attorneys only. The school's National Sports Law Institute, established in 1989, is affiliated with the LL.M. program and also conducts other activities.

The school has five clinical programs as of spring 2012: Mediation Clinic, Unemployment Compensation Advocacy Clinic, Restorative Justice Clinic (part of the Marquette University Law School Restorative Justice Initiative), Prosecutor Clinic (placement at the Milwaukee County District Attorney's Office), and Public Defender Clinic (placement in the Trial Division of the Wisconsin State Public Defender's Office in Milwaukee). U.S. News & World Report placed Marquette #8 among 14 alternative dispute resolution programs ranked in 2013.

Marquette offers seven joint degree programs: J.D./M.B.A. and J.D./M.B.A. in Sports Business (with the College of Business Administration); J.D./M.A. in Political Science and J.D./M.A. in International Affairs (with the Department of Political Science); J.D./M.A. in Bioethics from the Medical College of Wisconsin; J.D./M.A. Social and Applied Philosophy and J.D./M.A. History of Philosophy (with the Department of Philosophy).

== Statistics ==
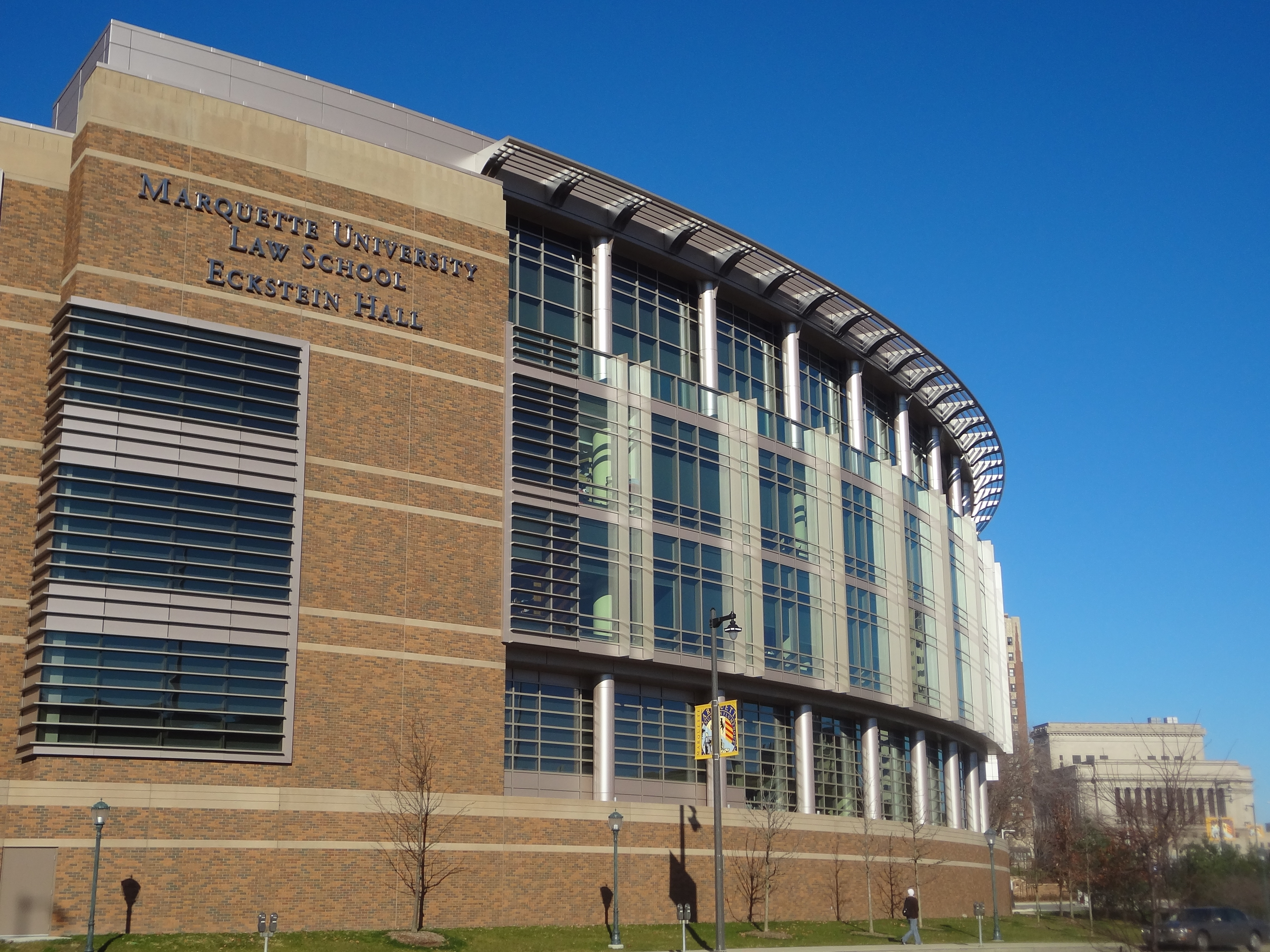
Eckstein Hall with the Milwaukee County Courthouse in the background.

=== Admissions ===
For the class entering in 2024, the school accepted 29.42% of applicants, with 41.63% of those accepted enrolling. The average enrollee had a 156 LSAT score and 3.70 undergraduate GPA.

=== Student body ===
For the fall 2023 entering J.D. class, there were 195 enrolled students (189 full-time and 6 part-time). The Law School's websites lists some 40 student organizations.

=== Employment outcomes ===
Based on data on the Class of 2015 submitted to the American Bar Association, Section of Legal Education and Admissions to the Bar, 62% of graduates obtained full-time, long term positions requiring bar admission (i.e., jobs as lawyers), within 9 months of graduation. Marquette Law's Law School Transparency under-employment score is 22.9%, indicating the percentage of the Class of 2014 unemployed, pursuing an additional degree, or working in a non-professional, short-term, or part-time job nine months after graduation.

=== Ranking ===
In its 2026 law school rankings, U.S. News & World Report ranked the law school 59th in the nation.

=== Cost of attendance ===
Tuition for the 2016–2017 academic year is $43,530 for full-time J.D. students and $1,725 per credit for part-time J.D. students. In a typical year some one-third of students receive merit-based scholarships. The Law School Transparency estimated debt-financed cost of attendance for three years is $231,690.

== Media ==
Marquette University Law School publishes four law journals: the flagship Marquette Law Review, the Marquette Sports Law Review (sports law), the Marquette Intellectual Property Law Review (intellectual property law) and the Marquette Benefits & Social Welfare Law Review (evolved out of the former Marquette Elder's Advisor). The Marquette Sports Law Review was the first biannual scholarly journal devoted entirely to issues in sports law. The Marquette Elder's Advisor, established in 1999, was one of only two student-edited elder law reviews in the nation until its evolution into the Benefits and Social Welfare Journal.

The Marquette Law Review was established in 1916 and is published quarterly. As of 2015, it ranked 134th among student-edited general law journals in a combined score based on citation impact-factor and currency-factor. Among specialized student-edited law journals, the Marquette Intellectual Property Law Review ranks 318th, the Marquette Sports Law Review ranks 500th, and the Marquette Elder's Advisor ranks 653rd under the same citation-impact methodology. Among student-edited intellectual property law journals, the Marquette Intellectual Property Law Review ranks 27th of 49 in a combined impact-factor and currency-factor score. Among arts, entertainment, and sports law journals, the Marquette Sports Law Review ranks 10th of 25 in a combined impact-factor and currency-factor score.

By arrangement with the Federation of Defense and Corporate Counsel, MULS faculty and students edit the FDCC Quarterly, a practitioners' journal for attorneys who defend clients in cases involving torts, products liability, environmental law, and other civil claims.

Mike Gousha, Distinguished Fellow in Law and Public Policy, hosts On the Issues with Mike Gousha, an interview program that presents national and local public figures before an audience of faculty, students, and interested members of the general public.

== Deans ==
- Joseph D. Kearney, 2003–present
- Howard B. Eisenberg, 1995–2002
- Frank DeGuire, 1984–1994
- Robert F. Boden, 1965–1984
- Reynolds C. Seitz, 1953–1965
- Francis X. Swietlik
- Clifton Williams
- Max Schoetz, 1916–1927
- James Graham Jenkins, 1908–1915

== Notable faculty ==
- Daniel D. Blinka, former assistant district attorney, evidence and criminal law scholar, voted "Best Law Professor" in Wisconsin in 2009 and 2010, and, with fellow professor Hammer, co-authored a digest of the decisions from the Wisconsin Supreme Court and the Wisconsin Court of Appeals for Wisconsin Lawyer, the magazine of the state bar association
- John A. Decker (deceased), former chief judge of the Wisconsin Court of Appeals
- Russ Feingold, former U.S. senator from Wisconsin, visiting professor of law in 2011
- Janine P. Geske, former Wisconsin Supreme Court justice, practitioner, scholar of restorative justice, and professor 1978–1981, 2000–2001
- Joan F. Kessler, judge of the Wisconsin Court of Appeals
- Matthew J. Parlow, dean of Chapman University School of Law
- Charles B. Schudson, former judge of the Wisconsin Court of Appeals
- Bud Selig, former Commissioner of Major League Baseball, adjunct professor in sports law and policy 2009-2016

== Notable alumni ==
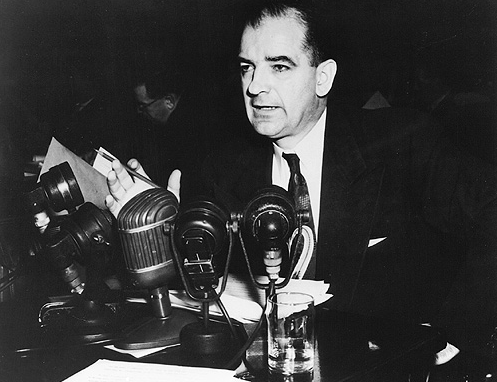
Marquette Law's alumnus (1935) U.S. Senator Joseph McCarthy

Government and Politics

- John B. Bennett, Member of Congress (MI)
- Gerald J. Boileau, Member of Congress (WI)
- Raymond Cannon, Member of Congress (WI)
- Buddy Cianci, Mayor of Providence, RI 1974–1984, 1991–2002
- James P. Daley, Brigadier General, National Guard
- Nicholas J. Deml, Commissioner, Vermont Department of Corrections
- Laverne Dilweg, Member of Congress (WI)
- Gerald T. Flynn, Member of Congress (WI)
- John Gower, Wisconsin State Assembly
- Stewart G. Honeck, Attorney General of Wisconsin
- Charles Kersten, Member of Congress (WI)
- Donald A. Manzullo, Member of Congress (IL)
- Joseph McCarthy, United States Senator (WI)
- Walter L. Merten, Wisconsin State Senate
- Harold V. Schoenecker, Wisconsin State Senate
- Martin J. Schreiber, Governor of Wisconsin
- Lawrence H. Smith, Member of Congress (WI)
- Thaddeus Wasielewski, Member of Congress (WI)
- Ron Tusler, Wisconsin State Assembly

Judiciary

- J. Waldo Ackerman, judge of the U.S. District Court for the Southern District of Illinois
- Thomas Cane, judge of the Wisconsin Court of Appeals
- Robert C. Cannon, judge of the Wisconsin Court of Appeals
- Thomas Curran, judge of the U.S. District Court for the Eastern District of Wisconsin
- Louis J. Ceci, justice of the Wisconsin Supreme Court
- John L. Coffey, judge of the U.S. Court of Appeals for the Seventh Circuit
- Patricia S. Curley, judge of the Wisconsin Court of Appeals
- William H. Dieterich, justice of the Wisconsin Supreme Court
- James E. Duffy, Jr., justice of the Hawaii Supreme Court
- James Randall Durfee, judge of the U.S. Court of Claims
- Terence T. Evans, judge of the U.S. Court of Appeals for the Seventh Circuit
- John P. Foley, judge of the Wisconsin Court of Appeals
- Noel Peter Fox, judge of the U.S. District Court for the Western District of Michigan
- Janine Geske, justice of the Wisconsin Supreme Court
- William C. Griesbach, judge of the U.S. District Court for the Eastern District of Wisconsin
- Leo B. Hanley, justice of the Wisconsin Supreme Court
- Robert W. Hansen, justice of the Wisconsin Supreme Court
- Neal Nettesheim, judge of the Wisconsin Court of Appeals
- Hugh R. O'Connell, Milwaukee County District Attorney and judge of the Milwaukee County Circuit Court.
- John C. Shabaz, judge of the U.S. District Court for the Western District of Wisconsin
- Harry G. Snyder, judge of the Wisconsin Court of Appeals
- J.P. Stadtmueller, judge of the U.S. District Court for the Eastern District of Wisconsin
- Roland J. Steinle, justice of the Wisconsin Supreme Court
- Patrick Thomas Stone, judge of the U.S. District Court for the Western District of Wisconsin
- Diane S. Sykes, judge of the U.S. Court of Appeals for the Seventh Circuit
- Robert Tehan, judge of the U.S District Court for the Eastern District of Wisconsin
- Clair H. Voss, judge of the Wisconsin Court of Appeals
- Ted E. Wedemeyer, Jr., judge of the Wisconsin Court of Appeals
- James A. Wynn, Jr., judge of the U.S. Court of Appeals for the Fourth Circuit
- Annette Ziegler, justice of the Wisconsin Supreme Court

Academia

- Mark L. Ascher, professor, textbook author, academic fellow of the American College of Trust & Estate Counsel and life member of the American Law Institute
- Aaron Twerski, rabbi, the Irwin and Jill Cohen Professor of Law at Brooklyn Law School, and former dean of the Hofstra University School of Law

Other

- Peter Konz (attended one year; transferred to University of Wisconsin), former NFL lineman
- Xavier Prather, first African-American winner of Big Brother
- Rachel Lindsay, first African-American lead of The Bachelorette (American TV series)
