= Authentically Orthodox =

2020 book by Zev Eleff

Authentically Orthodox: A Tradition-Bound Faith in American Life
- Author: Zev Eleff
- Language: English
- Genre: Nonfiction
- Publisher: Wayne State University Press
- Publication date: January 21, 2020
- Publication place: United States
- ISBN: 978-0-814-34482-8

Authentically Orthodox: A Tradition-Bound Faith in American Life is a 2020 book by American author Zev Eleff. The book traces the history of Orthodox Judaism in the United States in the 20th century, as Orthodox communities debated how much of modern American societal custom should be integrated into their lives at the expense of existing values and traditions. Each chapter of the book covers a case study of that debate, incidents revolving around issues like the role of women in Jewish practice, the changing of ingredients in Passover cooking to ones more available in America, and attempts to participate in non-Jewish interscholastic sports while still observing practices that could get in the way of playing sports. Eleff highlights that in each of those cases, textual Jewish sources did not clearly endorse or reject the existing tradition, but Orthodox communities still valued the existing traditions as genuine and wanted to preserve their differences from the general public.
