= Hubert Louis Will =

American judge

Senior Judge of the United States District Court for the Northern District of Illinois
- In office April 23, 1979 – December 9, 1995

Judge of the United States District Court for the Northern District of Illinois
- In office September 22, 1961 – April 23, 1979
- Appointed by: John F. Kennedy
- Preceded by: Seat established by 75 Stat. 80
- Succeeded by: Milton Shadur

Personal details
- Born: Hubert Louis Will; April 23, 1914 Milwaukee, Wisconsin
- Died: December 9, 1995 (aged 81) Oconomowoc, Wisconsin
- Education: University of Chicago (A.B.); University of Chicago Law School (J.D.)

Hubert Louis Will (April 23, 1914 – December 9, 1995) was a United States district judge of the United States District Court for the Northern District of Illinois.

== Education and career ==
Born in Milwaukee, Wisconsin, Will received an Artium Baccalaureus degree from the University of Chicago in 1935 and a J.D. degree from the University of Chicago Law School in 1937. He was a staff attorney with the General Counsel's Office at the Securities and Exchange Commission from 1937 to 1939. In 1939, he served as special secretary to United States Senator Robert F. Wagner. The same year he was appointed clerk of the United States Senate Committee on Banking, Housing, and Urban Affairs. From 1940 to 1941, he became a special assistant to United States Attorney General, serving in the Tax Division. He was an assistant to the General Counsel for the Office of Price Administration in 1942. He was tax counsel at the Alien Property Custodian in 1943. He was a Chief of the Counter-Espionage Branch, European Theater, of the Office of Strategic Services from 1943 to 1945. He was commissioned a captain in the United States Army at the end of World War II, serving from 1945 to 1946. He entered private practice in Chicago, Illinois thereafter and continued until his appointment to the federal bench.

== Federal judicial service ==
Will was nominated by President John F. Kennedy on September 14, 1961, to a new seat on the United States District Court for the Northern District of Illinois created by 75 Stat. 80. He was confirmed on September 21, 1961, and received his commission on September 22, 1961. He assumed senior status on April 23, 1979, and served in that capacity until his death on December 9, 1995, in Oconomowoc, Wisconsin.

== Sources ==
Legal offices
Preceded by Seat established by 75 Stat. 80	Judge of the United States District Court for the Northern District of Illinois; 1961–1979	Succeeded by Milton Shadur
