= Daniel D. Blinka =

American lawyer

Daniel D. Blinka is a practicing trial lawyer and law professor at Marquette University Law School in Milwaukee, Wisconsin. As a scholar, Blinka focuses primarily on evidence law, criminal procedure, and American history. He teaches evidence, trial advocacy, criminal law, constitutional criminal procedure, ethics, and American history. Blinka holds a Ph.D. in American history and a JD from the University of Wisconsin–Madison, where he has also taught history courses.

Blinka has received Marquette University Law School's outstanding teaching award several times, and is a recipient of the University-wide teaching excellence award. In 2009 and 2010, the Wisconsin Law Journal readers recognized him as the "Best Professor in Wisconsin". He has a number of widely cited publications, published by the principal legal publishers WestLaw and Lexis.

Before teaching at Marquette, Blinka worked as an assistant district attorney in Milwaukee County, where he primarily tried sexual assault cases and murders. Since then he has served as special hearing examiner for the two police officers accused of misconduct during the investigation of infamous serial killer Jeffrey Dahmer. He served as a lawyer for former Green Bay Packers tight end Mark Chmura during his sexual assault case. He also assisted in the defense of Chai Vang, the Hmong hunter who shot several other hunters to death in northern Wisconsin in 2004.

Blinka continues to practice as a trial lawyer in Wisconsin. He also teaches at continuing legal education events in Wisconsin. He is past-president of the Milwaukee Bar Association.

== Selected publications ==
- Wisconsin Evidence, 3rd ed., West Group, (2008).
- Pretrial Motions In Criminal Prosecutions, 4th ed., LEXIS Law Pub., (2008) (with Adams).
- Criminal Evidentiary Foundations, 2d ed., LexisNexis, (2007) (with Imwinkelried).
- Prosecutor's Manual For Arrest Search and Seizure, 2d ed., Matthew Bender & Co., (2004) (with Adams)
- "Ethical Firewalls, Limited Admissibility, and Rule 703", 76 Fordham Law Review 1229 (2007).
- "Ethics, Evidence and the Modern Adversary Trial", 19 Georgetown Journal of Legal Ethics 1 (2006).
- "Expert Testimony and the Relevancy Rules in the Age of Daubert", 90 Marquette Law Review 173 (2006).
- "The Roots of the Modern Trial: Greenleaf’s Testimony to the Harmony of Christianity, Science, and Law in Antebellum America", 27 Journal of the Early Republic 293 (2007).
- "'This Germ of Rottedness': Federal Trials in the New Republic", 1789–1807, 36 Creighton Law Review 135 (2003).
- "Trial by Jury on the Eve of Revolution: The Virginia Experience", 71 NO 3 University of Missouri-Kansas City School of Law 529 (Spring 2003).
