= Milton Shadur =

American judge

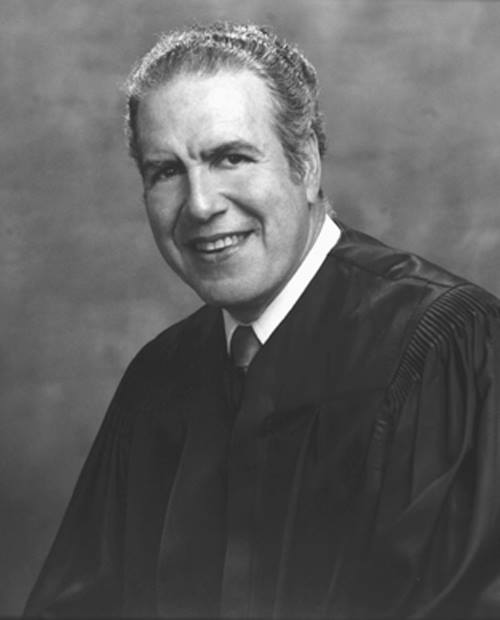

Senior Judge of the United States District Court for the Northern District of Illinois
- In office June 25, 1992 – January 14, 2018

Judge of the United States District Court for the Northern District of Illinois
- In office May 23, 1980 – June 24, 1992
- Appointed by: Jimmy Carter
- Preceded by: Hubert Louis Will
- Succeeded by: Blanche M. Manning

Personal details
- Born: Milton Irving Shadur; June 25, 1924 Saint Paul, Minnesota, US
- Died: January 14, 2018 (aged 93) Glencoe, Illinois, US
- Spouse: Eleanor Shadur
- Children: Robert, Karen and Beth Shadur
- Parents: Harris Shadur (father); Mary Shadur (nee Kaplan) (mother)
- Education: University of Chicago (BS); University of Chicago Law School (JD)

Milton Irving Shadur (June 25, 1924 – January 14, 2018) was a United States district judge of the United States District Court for the Northern District of Illinois.

== Early life and education ==
Shadur was born in Saint Paul, Minnesota, and raised in Milwaukee, Wisconsin, where he attended Washington High School, alma mater of fellow future attorneys Hubert Louis Will (whom Shadur would succeed on the federal bench), Newton N. Minow, and Abner J. Mikva. Shadur received a Bachelor of Science degree in Mathematics and Physics from the University of Chicago in 1943. Upon graduation, he joined the United States Navy, where he served as a radar officer on multiple ships, including the USS Sangamon, the victim of a kamikaze attack on May 24, 1945. After earning a J.D. degree from the University of Chicago Law School in 1949, he joined the law firm of Goldberg, Devoe & Brussell, which had become known as Shadur, Krupp & Miller by the time of Shadur's appointment to the federal judiciary, and is today known as Miller Shakman Levine & Feldman. In addition to Shadur, the firm produced a number of other highly regarded jurists, including former United States Supreme Court Justice Arthur Goldberg; Mikva, who served on the United States Court of Appeals for the District of Columbia Circuit and as White House Counsel; and United States District Court Judge Elaine E. Bucklo.

== Federal judicial service ==
On April 2, 1980, Shadur was nominated by President Jimmy Carter to the seat on the United States District Court for the Northern District of Illinois vacated by Judge Hubert Will. Both Shadur and Will graduated from Washington High School in Milwaukee and the University of Chicago for both undergrad and law school. Shadur was confirmed by the United States Senate on May 21, 1980, and received his commission on May 23, 1980. Although he assumed senior status on June 25, 1992, he carried a full load of civil and criminal cases for another quarter-century, until 2015. While Shadur left the courtroom on September 1, 2017, due to severe spinal stenosis, he never officially retired, handing off his final case shortly before his death.

According to Chief United States District Judge Rubén Castillo, Shadur sat to his right at public ceremonies and private meetings, and "was as close to an unofficial chief judge as anyone who served on our court," in addition to serving a mentor to other jurists; Shadur also wrote most of the rules adopted by the court. Castillo also noted that "Judge Shadur has authored over 11,000 district court opinions, many of which directly impacted the rights of thousands of individuals. No other member of our court can match this stunning body of written work."

== Notable cases ==
Soon after being commissioned, Shadur oversaw the court-ordered desegregation plan for Chicago Public Schools. He also presided over two key cases involving prisoners' rights. In the first, he approved a consent decree ordering Cook County to improve conditions at their jail, calling for the release of prisoners to curtail severe overcrowding. In the second, he found that class members were deprived of constitutional rights because resolution of their criminal appeals was substantially delayed as a consequence of the state's failure to appoint a sufficient number of attorneys to handle these appeals—meaning that a very large percentage of defendants would serve their entire custodial term before the appeal was heard.

Shadur was among the first federal judges to explicitly acknowledge abuse by Chicago police, using strong language to describe allegations of torture by officers in the 1990s. "It is now common knowledge," Shadur wrote in 1999, "that in the early- to mid-1980s, Chicago Police Commander Jon Burge and many officers working under him regularly engaged in the physical abuse and torture of prisoners to extract confessions."

Shadur regularly sat by designation on the First, Second, Third – where he sat on multiple panels with then-Judge Samuel Alito – Sixth, Ninth, and Tenth Circuit Courts of Appeals and from time to time on the D.C. Circuit as well. He authored approximately 130 published majority opinions and 32 published dissenting opinions (as well as a number of unpublished opinions) for the Courts of Appeals on which he was sitting.

== Personal and professional service ==
Shadur generously donated his time to advance both the legal profession and his community. As his United States District Court colleague Robert Gettleman noted, "Long before pro bono representation was recognized as important by all segments of the bar, Milton Shadur lived his professional life as a lawyer faithful to the principle that one of the obligations of membership in the bar is the obligation to render uncompensated legal services to those unable to afford them." Chicago Mayor Rahm Emanuel stated "Judge Milton Shadur devoted his life to upholding justice, to his country, and to his family. He served the country bravely in uniform in World War II, honorably for 37 years on the bench, and will long be remembered for his sharp legal mind, independence and integrity."

Shadur served multiple terms on the visiting committee of the University of Chicago Law School, including serving as chairman from 1971 to 1976. He served as counsel to the Illinois Judicial Inquiry Board from 1975 to 1980; as director of the Chicago Bar Foundation from 1978 to 1983; and in numerous roles for the Chicago Bar Association, including secretary and member of its board of managers. Shadur was also a past member of the American Bar Association's Special Committee on Youth Education for Citizenship; a Fellow of the American Bar Foundation; a past director of the Legal Assistance Foundation of Chicago and of the Law in American Society Foundation; a member of the governing council of the American Jewish Congress and of its Commission on Law and Social Action, as well as vice president of the Chicago chapter of that organization and chairman of the chapter's Commission on Law and Social Action.

Nationally, Shadur was a frequent lecturer at judicial and bar events, including the Seventh Circuit Judicial Conference, the Federal Judicial Center new judges' school, and the annual meeting of multidistrict litigation transferee judges, as well as at numerous educational conferences sponsored by such groups as the American Bar Association, the Chicago Bar Association, the Federal Bar Association, the American Judicature Society, the American Law Institute, the National Employment Lawyers Association, and the American Civil Liberties Union.

Shadur received numerous awards for his service, including recognition as a Legal Legend by the Chicago Chapter of the American Constitution Society in 2007; a Lifetime Achievement Award from the Jewish Judges Association of Illinois in 2015; and the first-ever Lifetime Achievement Award from the Chicago Bar Association in 2017.

Shadur was a member of the board of trustees of the Ravinia Festival, and became a Life Trustee in 1994. He was also a past trustee of the Village of Glencoe, Illinois.

== Controversies ==
On January 29, 2010, a federal appeals court reviewing a decision by Shadur reversed it and remanded the case to a different judge, claiming that Shadur had been too lenient in sentencing Edward Vrdolyak, a well-known former Chicago lawyer and politician, to probation in a corruption case and had committed gross procedural errors.

On June 17, 2014, he chose to remove himself from a case involving Michael Jordan after Jordan's attorneys claimed in a court filing that the judge had "demeaned and disparaged" Jordan by characterizing the former Bulls superstar as greedy and attempting to bully him into reducing his damages claim.

On November 14, 2014, a federal appeals court in Chicago removed Shadur from a sex-bias case because of the "abruptness and irregularity" in handling the case as well as the "unmistakable (and to us incomprehensible) tone of derision that pervades his opinion" dismissing the plaintiff's suit.

== Personal ==
Shadur and his wife Eleanor had been married for nearly 72 years at the time of his death on January 14, 2018, in Glencoe, Illinois.

== Sources ==
Legal offices
Preceded by Hubert Louis Will	Judge of the United States District Court for the Northern District of Illinois; 1980–1992	Succeeded by Blanche M. Manning
