= Wisconsin Law Review =

- Discipline: Law
- Language: English
- Edited by: Julia E. Stephenson

Publication details
- History: 1920-present
- Publisher: University of Wisconsin Law School (United States)
- Frequency: Bimonthly

Standard abbreviations
- Bluebook: Wis. L. Rev.
- ISO 4: Wis. Law Rev.

Indexing
- ISSN: 0043-650X
- LCCN: 25025664
- OCLC no.: 01607158

Links
- Journal homepage

The Wisconsin Law Review is a bimonthly law review published by students at the University of Wisconsin Law School. One issue each year is generally dedicated to a symposium or special topic.

== History ==
The review was established in 1920 by students and faculty of the law school. The first issue was published in October 1920. In 1935, the journal became entirely student-edited. The first faculty editor-in-chief was "legendary" law professor William Herbert ("Herbie") Page, who taught at the school from 1917 until his death in 1952. The first student editor-in-chief was Leon Foley. In 1940, Harriet Zetterberg became the journal's first female editor-in-chief.

== Admissions ==
Students are awarded staff membership based solely on their performance in a write-on competition at the end of their first year of law school, which consists of a Note, Bluebook exercise, and Diversity Statement. The journal no longer takes first-year grades into consideration.
