= Marquette Sports Law Review =

- Discipline: Law review
- Language: English
- Edited by: Jill Ingels

Publication details
- Former name: Marquette Sports Law Journal
- History: 1990-present
- Publisher: Marquette University Law School (United States)
- Frequency: Biannual

Standard abbreviations
- Bluebook: Marq. Sports L. Rev.
- ISO 4: Marquette Sports Law Rev.

Indexing
- ISSN: 1533-6484

Links
- Journal homepage

The Marquette Sports Law Review (formerly the Marquette Sports Law Journal) is a biannual law review edited and published by students at Marquette University Law School that addresses current issues in sports law. The journal is affiliated with the law school's National Sports Law Institute (NSLI).

== Editorial board and staff ==
The journal is produced by a staff of student editors and members. Membership invitations are extended to students selected in a writing competition held each summer. Membership for one academic year is a requirement to earn the NSLI's Sports Law Certificate.

The annual Joseph E. O'Neill Prize is awarded for the best student commentary.

== See also ==
- List of law journals
