= Mark L. Ascher =

American law professor

Mark L. Ascher is an American law professor, currently the Hayden W. Head Regents Chair for Faculty Excellence, and previously the Joseph D. Jamail Centennial Chair, and the Sylvan Lang Professor, at the University of Texas School of Law, and also previously the Ralph W. Bilby Professor at the James E. Rogers College of Law of the University of Arizona.

== Bibliography ==
Scott and Ascher on Trusts, formerly Scott on Trusts, now in its sixth edition, and written by Mark L. Ascher and Austin Wakeman Scott, is widely regarded as the leading authority on the law of trusts.

Federal Income Taxation of Trusts and Estates: Cases, Problems, and Materials, Fifth Edition, by Mark L. Ascher, Robert T. Danforth, and Justin T. Miller, was released by Carolina Academic Press in 2026.
