= James P. Daley =

James P. Daley is a retired brigadier general in the National Guard of the United States and former commander of the 32nd Infantry Brigade Combat Team.

== Education ==
- B.A. - Carroll College
- J.D. - Marquette University Law School
- Graduate - United States Army War College

== Career ==
Daley originally enlisted in the United States Marine Corps in 1966 and served in the Vietnam War. He would enlist in the Wisconsin Army National Guard in 1975 and later be commissioned a second lieutenant in 1977. Daley was promoted to brigadier general December 27, 2001.

Daley was elected District Attorney of Rock County, Wisconsin in 1984, and served until being appointed a judge by Governor Tommy Thompson in 1989. Daley then served as a Circuit Court Judge in Rock County until his retirement in 2018; during his time as judge, Daley founded the first Veterans' Treatment Court in the State of Wisconsin. In 2024, the State Bar of Wisconsin recognized Daley with its Lifetime Jurist Award, for decades of judicial service and leadership.

Awards he has received include the Bronze Star Medal with combat valor device, the Purple Heart, the Combat Action Ribbon, the Meritorious Service Medal with oak leaf cluster, the Army Commendation Medal with three oak leaf clusters, the Army Achievement Medal with two oak leaf clusters, the Marine Corps Good Conduct Medal, the Army Reserve Components Achievement Medal, the Presidential Unit Citation, the National Defense Medal with service star, the Vietnam Service Medal, the Armed Forces Reserve Medal, the Army Reserve Components Overseas Training Ribbon with award numeral 2, the Vietnam Campaign Medal, the Vietnam Gallantry Cross, the Vietnam Civil Actions Medal, the Expert Infantryman Badge, and the Excellence in Competition Badge.
