= Marquette Law Review =

- Discipline: Law review
- Language: English

Publication details
- History: 1916–present
- Publisher: Marquette University Law School (United States)
- Frequency: Quarterly

Standard abbreviations
- Bluebook: Marq. L. Rev.
- ISO 4: Marquette Law Rev.

Indexing
- ISSN: 0025-3987
- LCCN: 19000680
- OCLC no.: 818986734

Links
- Journal homepage

The Marquette Law Review is a quarterly law review edited by students at Marquette University Law School. Articles, essays, and student-written notes and comments from the review are accessible in PDF format on its web site, as well as online through LexisNexis, Westlaw, and HeinOnline.

== Mission ==
The review was established in 1916 as a way for the law school to "make known its ideals and communicate its spirit." It is the eighth-oldest law review in the nation. Since its founding, the review has been dedicated to "the publication of not only theoretical articles of the law, but articles of real practical aid to the practitioner." It has placed particular emphasis on legal issues in Wisconsin, which led former Wisconsin Chief Justice George R. Currie to "express on behalf of the members of our court appreciation to a Law Review from which we have so greatly benefited in performing our judicial labors."

== Staff ==
The review is produced by a staff of about 50 student editors and members. Membership invitations are extended to students in the top 10% percent of the 1L class. Alternatively, students may join the review by selection in a write-on competition held each summer. The editor-in-chief of Volume 106 is Matthew Kass.

== Notable articles ==
- Anthony Cardinal Bevilacqua, "Constitutionality of Tuition Vouchers," 76 Marq. L. Rev. 487 (1993)
- William Brennan, "The United States Supreme Court: Reflections Past and Present," 48 Marq. L. Rev. 437 (1965)
- Tom C. Clark, "The Supreme Court as Protector of Liberty Under the Rule of Law," 43 Marq. L. Rev. 11 (1959)
- Archibald Cox, "Labor Unions and the Public Interest," 42 Marq. L. Rev. 2 (1958) and "The Role of the Supreme Court in American Society," 50 Marq. L. Rev. 575 (1967)
- Charles Evans Hughes, "War Powers Under the Constitution," 2 Marq. L. Rev. 3 (1917)
- Edwin Meese III, "Our Constitution's Design: The Implications for its Interpretation," 70 Marq. L. Rev. 381 (1987)
- Ralph Nader, "Lawyers' Roles as New Attorneys," 80 Marq. L. Rev. 695 (1997)
- Louis H. Pollak, "Aristocrats of the Law," 50 Marq. L. Rev. 618 (1967)
- William H. Rehnquist, "Remarks to Commencement," 72 Marq. L. Rev. 145 (1988)
- Franklin D. Roosevelt, "The Road to Judicial Reform," 16 Marq. L. Rev. 227 (1932)
- Thomas L. Shaffer, "Why Does the Church have Law Schools," 78 Marq. L. Rev. 401 (1995)
