= Zev Eleff =

American rabbi and historian (born 1985)

Zev Eleff (born 1985) is an American rabbi, historian, and academic administrator specializing in Jewish studies and American religion. He is the twelfth president of Gratz College, a private Jewish institution in Jenkintown, Pennsylvania. His scholarship focuses on American Judaism.

== Biography ==
Eleff was born in Philadelphia in 1985 and raised in Baltimore and Chicago. He received a Bachelor of Arts from Yeshiva College in 2009 and rabbinic ordination from the Rabbi Isaac Elchanan Theological Seminary in 2011. He earned a Master of Arts from Teachers College, Columbia University (2011), and a Ph.D. in Near Eastern and Judaic Studies from Brandeis University in 2015.

In 2021, Eleff was appointed the twelfth president of Gratz College. Prior to his appointment at Gratz College, Eleff held senior academic administrative roles in Chicago. He served as chief academic officer of Hebrew Theological College and as vice provost of Touro College Illinois. He was among the youngest faculty members at Touro to be promoted to the rank of full professor.

His appointment to Gratz College was noted in regional Jewish media as part of a broader transition from academic leadership roles in Chicago, highlighting his work as a historian of American Judaism and his administrative experience.

== Presidency of Gratz College ==
Eleff became president of Gratz College in 2021 during a period of institutional transition. During this time, the college expanded its academic programs and physical footprint.

Gratz introduced new graduate programs in antisemitism studies, including a master’s degree described in reporting as among the first of its kind in the United States. A doctoral program in antisemitism studies followed, developed in response to growing demand for expertise in the field.

The college also expanded doctoral education in Jewish studies through an Executive Ph.D. program designed for working professionals, along with fellowship initiatives such as the Walder Fellowship, which supports Orthodox Jewish women pursuing advanced study.

Additional initiatives included expansion of faculty leadership in Holocaust and antisemitism studies, including the appointment of Ayal Feinberg as director of the Center for Holocaust Studies and Human Rights.

Gratz also developed digital scholarship initiatives, including the Grayzel Digital Platform and a digital archive project in partnership with the Elie Wiesel Foundation for Humanity.

The college also undertook a physical expansion to Philadelphia’s Main Line, including redevelopment of properties in Bala Cynwyd as part of a long-term campus plan.

== Scholarship ==
Eleff is a historian of American Judaism whose work examines the development of Jewish religious life in the United States. His research has addressed topics including Orthodox Judaism, religion and sports, and aspects of American cultural history.

== Selected works ==
- Living from Convention to Convention: A History of the NCSY, 1954–1980 (2009)
- Who Rules the Synagogue?: Religious Authority and the Formation of American Judaism (2016)
- Modern Orthodox Judaism: A Documentary History (2016)
- A Century at the Center: Orthodox Judaism and the Jewish Center (2018)
- Authentically Orthodox: A Tradition-Bound Faith in American Life (2020)
- Dyed in Crimson: Football, Faith, and Remaking Harvard's America (2023)
- The Greatest of All Time: A History of an American Obsession (2025)

== Reception ==
Eleff’s scholarship has been reviewed in academic journals. Writing in American Jewish History, David Ellenson described Modern Orthodox Judaism: A Documentary History as “a superb volume.” A review in The Review of Rabbinic Judaism characterized the work as “invaluable for its primary source extracts” and praised its “scope and fairness.”

In Religious Studies Review, Edward S. Shapiro described Who Rules the Synagogue? as a “major contribution” to the historiography of American Judaism.

Reviews of Authentically Orthodox have emphasized both its analytical framework and narrative qualities. Yaakov Bieler noted its engagement with major debates in American Orthodoxy, while Asher Oser wrote that “Eleff is a master storyteller.”

== Awards and honors ==
Eleff has received awards including the Wasserman Prize of the American Jewish Historical Society and a Rockower Award for Excellence from the American Jewish Press Association. His books have twice been named finalists for the National Jewish Book Award.

In 2024, he was named a “Trailblazer in Higher Education” by City & State Pennsylvania.

== Personal life ==
Eleff resides in Merion Station, Pennsylvania, with his wife and their children.
