= J. Riley Stone =

20th century American politician

James Riley Stone

Member of the Wisconsin State Assembly from the Sauk County district
- In office January 3, 1949 – January 5, 1959
- Preceded by: George J. Woerth
- Succeeded by: Walter Terry

Sheriff of Sauk County, Wisconsin
- In office August 15, 1945 – January 3, 1949
- Appointed by: Walter Samuel Goodland
- Preceded by: Clayton H. Wilcox
- Succeeded by: James W. Hayes

Personal details
- Born: October 17, 1886 Sully County, South Dakota, U.S.
- Died: February 25, 1978 (aged 91) Reedsburg, Wisconsin, U.S.
- Resting place: Green Wood Cemetery, Reedsburg
- Party: Republican
- Spouse: Vera Amalia Milhaupt (m. 1916–1978)
- Children: 9
- Relatives: Frank J. Remington (son-in-law)
- Education: University of Wisconsin
- Profession: Farmer

Military service
- Allegiance: United States
- Branch/service: Wisconsin National Guard; United States Army
- Years of service: 1917–1918
- Rank: 1st Lieutenant, USA
- Unit: 341st Reg. U.S. Infantry; 75th Reg. U.S. Field Art.
- Battles/wars: World War I

James Riley Stone Sr. (October 17, 1886 – February 25, 1978) was an American farmer, businessman, and Republican politician from Reedsburg, Wisconsin. He was a member of the Wisconsin State Assembly for five terms, representing Sauk County from 1949 through 1959. He also served four years as sheriff. At various times his name was abbreviated as either James R. Stone, J. Riley Stone, or just Riley Stone.

== Biography ==
James Riley Stone was born in Sully County, South Dakota, in October 1886. As a child, he moved with his parents to Reedsburg, Wisconsin, where he resided for most of the rest of his life. He was educated in the Reedsburg public schools for elementary and high school, and went on to attend the University of Wisconsin. He graduated with a bachelor's degree from the University's College of Commerce (now the Wisconsin School of Business) in 1907.

Stone was involved for some time in the Wisconsin National Guard, and when the United States became involved in World War I, he was selected for service in the United States Army. He initially served as an enlisted soldier in the 341st Infantry Regiment—a mobilized Wisconsin National Guard unit—but after a series of transfers, ended up serving as a first lieutenant in the 75th Field Artillery Regiment.

After the passage of the Eighteenth Amendment to the United States Constitution and the Volstead Act, creating a legal framework for alcohol prohibition, Stone was appointed the federal prohibition director for Wisconsin. After several years in that role, in 1925, he was appointed postmaster at Reedsburg.

Stone was also involved with his father in a large farm real-estate business. By 1930 they owned ten farms which were rented to tenants, and Stone later purchased two dairy farms for his own use. After the implementation of the New Deal, Stone served for ten years as an agent of the Federal Land Bank. Through his farm interests, he was also an active member and officer in the Sauk County Farm Association.

Stone first served in county office in 1945, when he was appointed sheriff of Sauk County by Governor Walter Samuel Goodland, to fill a vacancy. He was subsequently elected to a full term as sheriff in 1946, running on the Republican Party ticket.

Two years later, Stone chose to enter the race for Wisconsin State Assembly in Sauk County, launching a primary challenge against George J. Woerth, who had previously been a member of the Wisconsin Progressive Party. Stone narrowly defeated Woerth in the September 1948 primary, and went on to win the general election with 73% of the vote. He was re-elected four times, but was unsuccessful seeking a sixth term in 1958. He was defeated in the Republican primary by Walter Terry, who went on to succeed him in the Assembly.

Stone remained active in local politics after leaving the Assembly, and served several terms as member and later president of the Reedsburg school board.

He died at his home in Reedsburg on February 25, 1978, at age 91.

== Personal life and family ==
James Riley Stone was the second of three children born to James Aschel Stone and Mary "Minnie" Louise Stone (née Corwith). James R. Stone's mother was born and raised in Sauk County, Wisconsin, before her marriage to James A. Stone and their brief move to South Dakota. After their return to Wisconsin, James A. Stone served on the Sauk County board of supervisors.

Stone married Vera A. Milhaupt, of New Holstein, Wisconsin, on October 10, 1916. They had nine children, though one son died in childhood, and were married for 61 years before his death in 1978. Vera died three years later, at the time of her death, they had 30 grandchildren and eight great-grandchildren.

Four of Stone's sons served in the armed forces, three in World War II, one in the Vietnam War:

- Richard W. Stone (born 1919) was an officer in the United States Army and rose to the rank of captain, serving in the headquarters company of the 2nd Infantry Regiment, 5th Infantry Division. He participated in the Normandy landings on D-Day, and fought in northern France for three months before being mortally wounded on September 8, 1944.
- Edward L. Stone (born 1920) was enlisted in the United States Marine Corps. He was wounded at the Battle of Corregidor in May 1942 and was taken prisoner as the Japanese conquered the Philippines. He remained a prisoner for the rest of the war, surviving three years of captivity. After the war he had a successful career with International Dairy Supply Co.
- Frederick Stone (born 1923) was enlisted in the Army and served in a combat engineering battalion in France during World War II.
- Lawrence J. Stone (born 1930) was too young to serve in World War II, but served more than 15 years as a U.S. Army officer. He earned a bronze star while serving in the Vietnam War as commanding officer of the 156th Aviation Company. He ultimately attained the rank of lieutenant colonel, serving as commander of the 1st battalion, 61st Infantry Regiment, 5th Infantry Division, after his return from Vietnam.

Their other children also had notable public service:

- Susan (born 1922) left school to work in an ammunition factory during World War II. She married Frank J. Remington, then a U.S. Army pilot. Frank Remington went on to become a prominent figure in the evolution of the University of Wisconsin, and a nationally renowned legal scholar in reforming the criminal justice system. He is the namesake of the Frank J. Remington Center at the University of Wisconsin Law School.
- Mark H. Stone (born 1926) spent most of his life as an educator, and was superintendent of the Little Chute School District from 1971 to 1990.
- Patrick E. Stone (born 1932) was city treasurer for many years in Baraboo and was director of the Sauk County Fair Board.

== Electoral history ==
=== Sauk County sheriff (1946) ===
Sauk County Sheriff Election, 1946
| Party | Candidate | Votes | % | ±% |
|---|---|---|---|---|
General Election, November 5, 1946
| Republican | James Riley Stone | 9,227 | 93.54% | |
| Socialist | Carl F. Bloedau | 637 | 6.46% | |
| Plurality | | 8,590 | 87.08% | |
| Total votes | | 9,864 | 100.0% | |

=== Wisconsin Assembly (1948, 1950, 1952, 1954, 1956, 1958) ===
| Year | Election | Date | Elected | | | | Defeated | | | | Total | Plurality |
|---|---|---|---|---|---|---|---|---|---|---|---|---|
| 1948 | Primary | Sep. 21 | James R. Stone | Republican | 3,072 | 54.69% | George J. Woerth | Rep. | 2,545 | 45.31% | 5,617 | 527 |
| 1948 | General | Nov. 2 | James R. Stone | Republican | 9,279 | 72.97% | Melvin H. Flath | Dem. | 3,304 | 25.98% | 29,741 | 5,103 |
| 1948 | General | Nov. 2 | James R. Stone | Republican | 9,279 | 72.97% | Ethel Dahir | Soc. | 133 | 1.05% | 29,741 | 5,103 |
| 1950 | General | Nov. 7 | James R. Stone (inc) | Republican | 7,637 | 61.24% | Herbert R. Meyer | Dem. | 4,756 | 38.14% | 12,470 | 2,881 |
| 1950 | General | Nov. 7 | James R. Stone (inc) | Republican | 7,637 | 61.24% | Carl F. Bloedau | Soc. | 77 | 0.62% | 12,470 | 2,881 |
| 1952 | General | Nov. 4 | James R. Stone (inc) | Republican | 11,303 | 66.36% | Arnold E. Davis | Dem. | 5,730 | 33.64% | 17,033 | 5,573 |
| 1954 | General | Nov. 2 | James R. Stone (inc) | Republican | 7,374 | 62.94% | James R. Head | Dem. | 4,341 | 37.06% | 11,715 | 3,033 |
| 1956 | Primary | Sep. 11 | James R. Stone (inc) | Republican | 2,741 | 50.95% | Oscar L. Laper | Rep. | 2,479 | 46.08% | 5,380 | 262 |
| 1956 | Primary | Sep. 11 | James R. Stone (inc) | Republican | 2,741 | 50.95% | Frank Harmeyer | Rep. | 160 | 2.97% | 5,380 | 262 |
| 1956 | General | Nov. 6 | James R. Stone (inc) | Republican | 10,390 | 66.32% | Wencle Bulin | Dem. | 5,276 | 33.68% | 15,666 | 5,114 |
| 1958 | Primary | Sep. 16 | Walter Terry | Republican | 1,570 | 55.40% | James R. Stone (inc) | Rep. | 1,264 | 44.60% | 2,834 | 306 |

Wisconsin State Assembly
| Preceded by George J. Woerth | Member of the Wisconsin State Assembly from the Sauk County district January 3, 1949 – January 5, 1959 | Succeeded by Walter Terry |
Legal offices
| Preceded by Clayton H. Wilcox | Sheriff of Sauk County, Wisconsin; August 15, 1945 – January 3, 1949 | Succeeded by James W. Hayes |
