= Dignity taking =

Confiscation of property

Dignity taking is the destruction or confiscation of property rights from owners or occupiers, where the intentional or unintentional outcome is dehumanization or infantilization. There are two requirements: (1) involuntary property destruction or confiscation and (2) dehumanization or infantilization. Dehumanization is "the failure to recognize an individual or group's humanity" and infantilization is "the restriction of an individual or group's autonomy based on the failure to recognize and respect their full capacity to reason." Evidence of a dignity taking can be established empirically through either a top-down approach, examining the motive and intent behind those who initiated the taking, or a bottom-up approach, examining the viewpoints of dispossessed people.

When this larger harm called a dignity taking occurs, mere reparations (or compensation for physical things taken) are not enough. Dignity restoration is required. Dignity restoration is a remedy that seeks to provide dispossessed individuals and communities with material compensation through processes that affirm their humanity and reinforce their agency. In practical terms, the remedial process places dispossessed individuals or communities in the driver's seat and gives them a significant degree of autonomy in deciding how they are made whole.

The dignity takings/dignity restoration framework was first created by Professor Bernadette Atuahene following her empirical exploration of land dispossession and restitution in South Africa in her book, We Want What's Ours: Learning from South Africa's Restitution Program (Oxford University Press 2014). Since then, many scholars across disciplines have applied these socio-legal concepts to an array of case studies in various time periods and geographic locations, providing a transnational, historicized approach to understanding involuntary property loss and its material and non-material consequences.

The dignity takings/dignity restoration framework provides a lexicon to describe and analyze property takings from poor and vulnerable populations across the globe in different historical periods; focuses on redress by linking events of property dispossession to highlight opportunities for learning, resistance, and solidarity; allows people who are not property scholars to participate in the conversation about involuntary property loss and adequate remedies; captures both the material and immaterial consequences of property confiscation; and inserts dignity into the scholarly discourse about property, countering the singular focus on efficiency, which has dominated legal analysis since the ascendancy of law and economics.

== Violent conflict ==
=== American Revolutionary War and Loyalists ===
Legal historian Daniel Hulsebosch applied the dignity takings framework to the American Revolutionary War when the nascent governments subjected Loyalists to a civil death by expropriating their properties, revoking their professional licenses, annulling their civil and political rights, and detaining and banishing them. The American revolutionary government dehumanized Loyalists by taking their lives—the most severe form of dehumanization. The states also infantilized Loyalists by stripping them of their most essential rights and thus impairing their basic autonomy.

Though Loyalists were deprived of their property alongside acts of dehumanization and infantilization, Hulsebosch found that it was not a dignity taking because their stigmatized identity was a choice, rather than an immutable characteristic. However, it seems there may be two different types of dignity takings: for some people, the source of their oppression is an identity that they chose and can disavow at any time, but others are subjugated by an identity that they cannot escape.

=== Iraqi Kurds ===
Political scientist Craig Albert analyzed whether the treatment of Iraqi Kurds under both the Islamic State (ISIS) and Saddam Hussein's Baath regime constituted a dignity taking. Both regimes denied Kurdish self-rule through massive property deprivation and state-led violence.

Albert's research outlined the circumstances required for the denial of self-rule to be considered infantilization: the community must have a will to self-govern, the community must have the capacity to self-govern, and no greater conflict must result from granting sovereign rule. In his case study of the Iraqi Kurds, Albert concluded that all three factors were present, and that a dignity taking had occurred.

== Criminal punishment ==
Lua Yuille describes gang injunctions as dignity takings. Gang injunctions prohibit suspected gang members from engaging in a wide range of activities that would otherwise be legal. They cannot, for example, in public wear “gang clothes,” or carry “marking substances” like paint cans, pens, and other writing utensils they can potentially use for graffiti. This bans gang members from using certain property in public. These bans amount to the deprivation of identity property, which is property that implicates how people understand themselves. Additionally, Yuille found that the state treats young gang members like inhumane “super predators,” instead of as children and teenagers. The City of Monrovia subjected suspected gang members to a dignity taking because this dehumanizing treatment occurred with the deprivation of their identity property

== Labor & Employment ==
=== Undocumented workers in Chicago ===
Sociologist and legal scholar Cesar Rosado conducted ethnographic work in a Chicago worker center called Arise, which provides services to ensure that vulnerable and undocumented workers can exercise their labor rights. Rosado looked at whether two claims of unpaid wages fit within the framework of a dignity taking. First, the unpaid wages constituted the property taken from the workers. When there are severe power asymmetries between employers and workers, infantilization can occur as employers rob their workers of agency. Rosado concluded that wage theft claims can constitute a dignity taking.

=== Mining and construction battalions in Communist Poland ===
Polish legal scholars Ewa Kozerska and Piotr Stec argue that Communist Poland's mining and construction battalions are another example of dignity takings because wage theft accompanied dehumanizing treatment. Deemed unworthy of standard military training or uniforms, the battalions' soldiers were considered “class enemies,” e.g. landowners, economic elites, dissenters and their family members, and clerics. Although the battalions operated under the guise of military service, the soldiers were slaves subject to forced labor, treated like animals, and dehumanized.

== Public policy ==
=== Nationalization of land, farms, and property in Communist Poland ===
Legal scholars Kozerska and Stec also describe the nationalization of land, agricultural production, and other property in post war Communist Poland as a dignity taking. The state provided landowners no compensation for their nationalized property, and forced them to leave town and abandon their communities. Though the goal of communism was not to dehumanize and infantilize the landowning population—but to free the working class from control and abuse by the owners of capital—the dehumanization and infantilization of the capital class was a necessary evil in this larger liberatory project. According to Kozerska and Stec, “these individuals were persecuted even after expropriation, as they were stigmatized for being a bezet (i.e., former landowner)” and deprived of nearly all opportunity for gainful employment.

=== Forced evictions in rural China ===
Legal scholar Eva Pils also writes about a communist nation—China—and how forced evictions intended to create space for China's rapidly expanding cities involved a dignity taking. China has allowed private ownership of urban buildings since the reforms of the 1980s, but not ownership of the underlying land. Since urban owners can buy and sell their buildings, but rural owners cannot, rural properties are extremely vulnerable to expropriation in China as the burgeoning urban real estate market encroaches upon them. Relying on ethnographic interviews, Pils also determined that rural Chinese citizens are routinely infantilized and dehumanized in the course of the dignity taking because the state believes that they are “low quality”, unruly, confused individuals who need to be forcibly educated for their own good in what the state euphemistically calls study classes.

Pils primary contribution was to alter the definition of a dignity taking. In We Want What's Ours, the property confiscation had to occur “without paying just compensation or without a legitimate public purpose.” Pils argues that because the method the Chinese state used to acquire the land and remove its inhabitants was dehumanizing and infantilizing, even if it pays just compensation and the taking is for the legitimate purpose of economic development, a dignity taking has still occurred. Hence, the updated definition of a dignity taking is when a state directly or indirectly destroys or confiscates property rights from owners or occupiers, and the intentional or unintentional outcome is dehumanization or infantilization.

=== Coverture ===
Coverture is a legal doctrine dismantled during the twentieth century that prohibited a wife from owning property or entering into contracts in her own name. Historical documents also reveal that the infantilization of women was intended by legislators who codified coverture. But, for women who owned property, the act that precipitated the alleged dignity taking was marriage, which legal scholar Hendrik Hartog argues is more accurately understood as dignity bestowing rather than dignity denying. A bottom up empirical interrogation using original sources established that becoming a wife was a source of dignity for women and it was spinsterhood that was a source of shame. Marriage was a gateway to adulthood and did not trap women in a permanent form of childhood, as the definition of infantilization requires. As a result, Hartog argued that coverture did not constitute a dignity taking because it lacked the dehumanization or infantilization element. Hartog argues that most women chose to enter into relationships where they were subordinate to and dependent upon a man.

== Community property ==
=== Chicago Public Schools ===
Legal scholar Matthew Shaw studied the controversial 2013 closure of 49 public schools—which occurred primarily in Chicago's communities of color— and concluded it was a dignity taking. Neighborhood schools are formally state property, but informally they are community property shared by residents in its vicinity.

=== Japantown in Sacramento, California ===
Legal scholar Thomas Joo has argued that the demolition of Sacramento's Japantown as part of the city's urban renewal program constituted a dignity taking. Urban renewal was a public program created in the 1940s and 50s that used eminent domain to transfer ownership of homes and businesses in blighted areas to private developers for redevelopment. The avowed purpose of urban renewal was to eliminate urban decay. In practice, it eliminated long standing communities—mostly communities of color like Japantown—which belonged to the people who inhabited, ran businesses in, and frequented the area. Consequently, when authorities demolished Japantown, the larger community as well as individual homeowners and business proprietors suffered an involuntary property loss. After examining key archival records, Joo did not find evidence that city officials intended to dehumanize or infantilize occupants of Japantown. However, the Japanese American occupants newly returned from the internment camps of World War II felt that the demolition of their community was a continuation of this dehumanizing internment.

=== Los Angeles' King-Drew Hospital ===
Legal scholar Shaun Ossei-Owusu notes the trend of urban hospital closings in low-income communities, and argues that the closure of Los Angeles' King-Drew hospital in 2007 was a dignity taking. Because King-Drew was the only hospital in the city of Compton and surrounding areas that treated everyone regardless of insurance coverage, it was the community property of those within the hospital's catchment area. Bureaucratic neglect and negligence led to several deaths—the most severe form of dehumanization. After the Los Angeles Times published an award-winning expose on the hospital's many shortcomings, the federal government put it under review and then closed the hospital in 2007. This involuntary property loss as a result of dehumanizing neglect and mistreatment constituted a dignity taking.

=== Gay bathhouses in New York City ===
Political Scientist Stephen Engel and English professor Thomas Lyle argue that the shuttering of gay bathhouses in New York at the height of the HIV/AIDS epidemic was a dignity taking. Although the public discourse characterized gay bathhouses as threats to public health and closed them under this pretext, empirical evidence shows that bathhouses were community institutions that actually bolstered public health through education and awareness campaigns. Through closure, state authorities infantilized gay communities by stripping them of their autonomy By shutting down the gay bathhouses, state authorities “destroy[ed] community, depriv[ed] gay men of an important source of emotional sustenance and connection, and ignor[ed] the community-based work accomplished.”

== See also ==
- Dahiya doctrine
- Domicide
- Humiliation
