= Margaret Raymond =

American lawyer (born 1958)

Dean of the University of Wisconsin Law School
- In office July 2011 – July 2020
- Preceded by: Kenneth B. Davis
- Succeeded by: Daniel P. Tokaji

Personal details
- Born: 1958 (age 67–68) New York City, New York, U.S.
- Spouse: Mark Sidel
- Education: Carleton College (BA); Columbia University (JD)
- Occupation: Administrator, Professor

Margaret Raymond (born 1958) is an American legal scholar who is professor of law and was formerly the Fred W. and Vi Miller dean at the University of Wisconsin Law School. Her research interests include ethics and criminal law.

== Biography ==
Raymond grew up in New York City, where she was friends with Elena Kagan, and graduated from Hunter College High School in 1976. She studied at Carleton College, where she received a Bachelor of Arts cum laude in 1982. She attended Columbia Law School, serving as editor-in-chief of Columbia Law Review, and graduating first in her class with a Juris doctor in 1985. After law school, she clerked for Judge James L. Oakes of the United States Court of Appeals for the Second Circuit, and then for United States Supreme Court Associate Justice Thurgood Marshall in 1986–1987. Following her clerkships, she practiced law first as an associate at Morrison & Foerster in New York City, where she worked on litigation, and then at a criminal defense firm in Portland, Oregon.

In 1995, she joined the law faculty as associate professor at the University of Iowa, in 1999 was promoted to professor, and in 2010 she was named the William G. Hammond Professor of Law. In 2007, she was considered for the post of dean at the University of Buffalo Law School. In 2011, she became the Fred W. & Vi Miller dean and professor of law at the University of Wisconsin–Madison. She followed Kenneth B. Davis, who was dean since 1997. In 2019, her salary was $400,554. In 2018, she argued law school education benefits society, in response to Samuel Moyn's article titled, "Law Schools Are Bad for Democracy." In January 2019, Raymond was a finalist for the position of executive vice president and provost at the University of Iowa. In April 2019, she announced the endowment of a chair at the university of Wisconsin Law School to honor the late Professor James E. Jones Jr., the school's first African American faculty member. In spring of 2020, she stepped down from the deanship at the University of Wisconsin Law School, but remained on the faculty as the Warren P. Knowles Chair.

In 2015, the second edition was published of Raymond's casebook, The Law and Ethics of Law Practice.

== Working experience ==
She served as a law clerk to the late Justice Thurgood Marshall of the U.S. Supreme Court and the late Judge James L. Oakes of the U.S. Court of Appeals for the Second Circuit. Following her clerkships, she practiced as a commercial litigator and a criminal defense lawyer.

== Books published ==
Margaret Raymond. The Law and Ethics of Law Practice. St. Paul, MN: West, 2009.

InfoHawk+ | WorldCat

=== Articles ===
Margaret Raymond, “Professional Responsibility for the Pro Se Attorney,” 1 St. Mary's J. on Legal Malpractice & Ethics 2 (2011).

HeinOnline | Westlaw

Margaret Raymond, “Inside, Outside: Cross-Border Enforcement of Attorney Advertising Restrictions,” 43 Akron L. Rev. 801 (2010).

HeinOnline | Lexis | Westlaw

Margaret Raymond, “Looking for Trouble: Framing and the Dignitary Interest in the Law of Self-Defense,” 71 Ohio St. L.J. 287 (2010).

HeinOnline | Lexis | Westlaw

Margaret Raymond, “On Legalistic Behavior, the Advocacy Privilege, and Why People Hate Lawyers,” 55 Buff. L. Rev. 929 (2007-2008).

HeinOnline | Lexis | Westlaw

Margaret Raymond, “The Right to Refuse and the Obligation to Comply: Challenging the Gamesmanship Model of Criminal Procedure,” 54 Buff. L. Rev. 1483 (April 2007).

HeinOnline | Lexis | Westlaw

Margaret Raymond, “No Fellow in American Legislation: Weems v. United States and the Doctrine of Proportionality,” 30 Vt. L. Rev. 251 (2006).

HeinOnline | Lexis | Westlaw

Margaret Raymond, “The Professionalization of Ethics,” 33 Fordham Urb. L.J. 153 (2005-2006).

HeinOnline | Lexis | Westlaw

Margaret Raymond, “Criminal Defense Heroes,” 13 Widener L.J. 167 (2003-2004).

HeinOnline | Lexis | Westlaw

Margaret Raymond, “Commentary on the Drug War,” 6 J. Gender Race & Just. 447 (2002).

HeinOnline | Lexis | Westlaw

Margaret Raymond, “Penumbral Crimes,” 39 Am. Crim. L. Rev. 1395 (2002).

HeinOnline | Lexis | Westlaw

Margaret Raymond, “The Problem with Innocence,” 49 Clev. St. L. Rev. 449 (2001).

HeinOnline | Lexis | Westlaw

Margaret Raymond, “Fool for a Client: Some Reflections on Representing the President,” 68 Fordham L. Rev. 851 (1999-2000).

HeinOnline | Lexis | Westlaw

Margaret Raymond, “Down on the Corner, Out in the Street: Considering the Character of the Neighborhood in Evaluating Reasonable Suspicion,” 60 Ohio St. L.J. 99 (1999).

HeinOnline | Lexis | Westlaw

Margaret Raymond, “Fool for a Client: Some Preliminary Thoughts,” 1999 Prof. Law. Symp. Issues 175 (1999).

HeinOnline

Margaret Raymond, “Police Policing Police: Some Doubts,” 72 St. John's L. Rev. 1255 (1998).

HeinOnline | Lexis | Westlaw

Margaret Raymond, “Rejecting Totalitarianism: Translating the Guarantees of Constitutional Criminal Procedure,” 76 N.C. L. Rev. 1193 (1997-1998).

HeinOnline | Lexis | Westlaw

=== Book reviews ===
Margaret Raymond, review of Midnight Assassin: A Murder in America's Heartland, by Patricia Bryan and Thomas Wolf, 57 J. Legal Educ. 293 (2007).

HeinOnline | Westlaw

Margaret Raymond, “The Importance of Being Important,” (review of Edward Lazarus, Closed Chambers: The First Eyewitness Account of the Epic Struggle Inside the Supreme Court), 84 Iowa L. Rev. 147 (1998-1999).

HeinOnline | Lexis | Westlaw

== Personal life ==
In 1987, she married Mark Sidel, who is currently the Doyle-Bascom Professor of Law and Public Affairs at the University of Wisconsin-Madison.

== See also ==
- List of law clerks for the tenth seat of the Supreme Court of the United States

== Select publications ==
=== Books ===
- Raymond, Margaret; Hughes, Emily (2015). The Law and Ethics of Law Practice (American Casebook Series) (2nd ed.). Eagen, MN: West Academic Publishing. ISBN 9781628103960.

=== Articles ===
- Raymond, Margaret (2010). "Looking for Trouble: Framing and the Dignitary Interest in the Law of Self-Defense" (PDF). Ohio St. L. J. 71 (2): 287.
- Raymond, Margaret (2007). "On Legalistic Behavior, the Advocacy Privilege, and Why People Hate Lawyers". Buffalo L. Rev. 55: 929.
- Raymond, Margaret (2006). "'No Fellow in American Legislation': Weems v. United States and the Doctrine of Proportionality" (PDF). Vermont L. Rev. 30: 251.
- Raymond, Margaret (1999). "Fool for a Client: Some Reflections on Representing the President". Ford. L. Rev. 68: 851.
- Raymond, Margaret (1998). "Rejecting Totalitarianism: Translating the Guarantees of Constitutional Criminal Procedure". N.C. L. Rev. 76 (4): 1193.
- Raymond, Margaret (1994). "The Unconstitutionality of the Victim and Witness Protection Act under the Seventh Amendment". Colum. L. Rev. 84 (6): 1590–1615. doi:10.2307/1122474. JSTOR 1122474.
