= Reparations (transitional justice) =

Compensation given for an abuse or injury

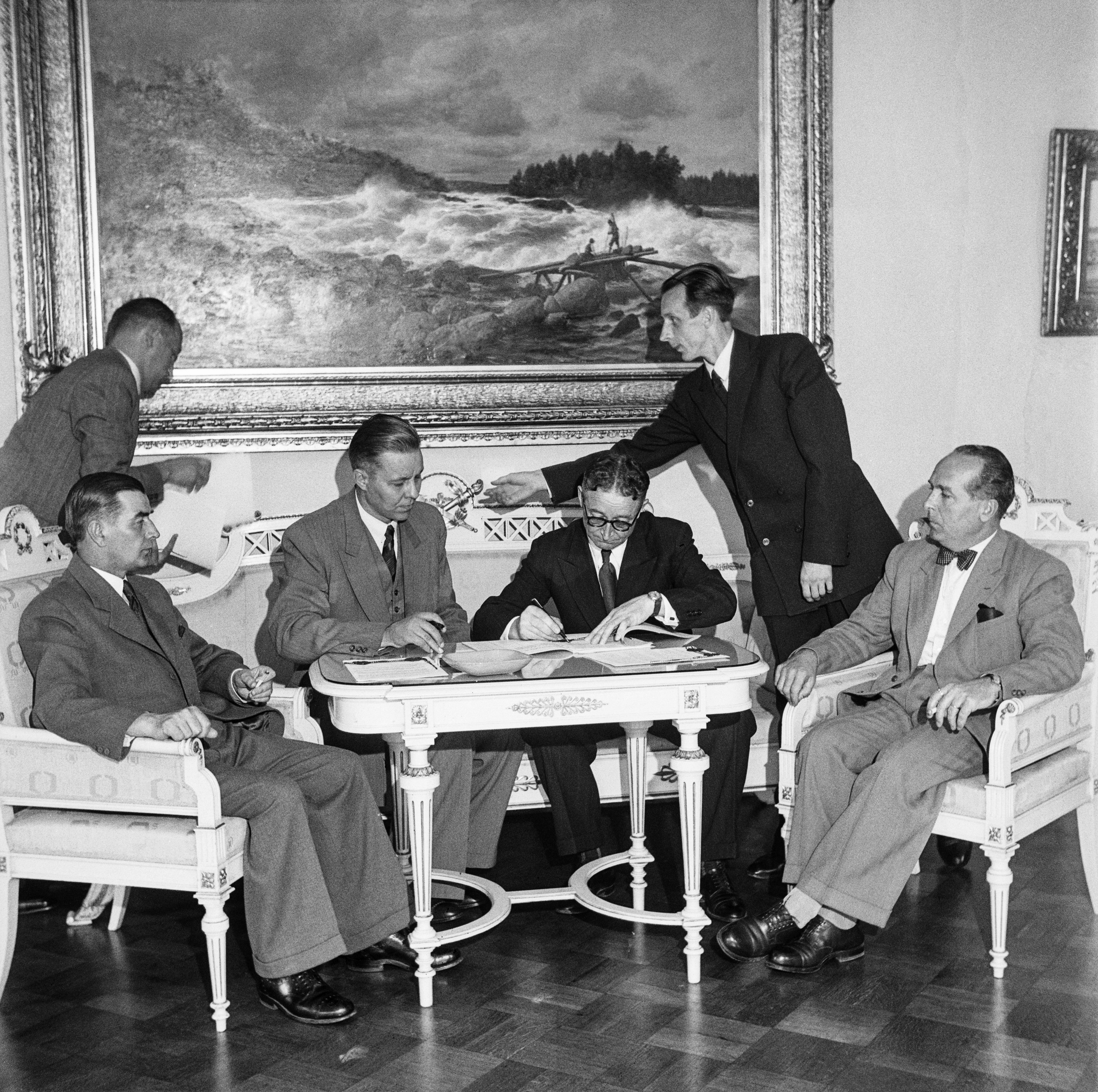
Negotiations about war reparations, July 26, 1947.

Reparations are broadly understood as compensation provided for an abuse or injury. The colloquial meaning of the term has changed substantially over the past century. In the early twentieth century, reparations generally referred to interstate transfers imposed as punitive measures following armed conflict (see war reparations), as determined by treaty and paid by the defeated party, such as the reparations required of Germany and its allies after World War I.

In contemporary usage, reparations may include war-related damages and restitution, rehabilitation, satisfaction, and guarantees of non-repetition provided to victims of human rights violations by those responsible. The right of victims to obtain reparations, and the corresponding obligation of responsible parties to provide them, have been recognized in international law, including through instruments adopted by the United Nations. However, the recognition is limited to gross violations of international human rights law and serious violations of International humanitarian law.

In transitional justice, reparations are measures undertaken by a state to redress gross and systematic violations of international human rights law or international humanitarian law. Among transitional justice mechanisms, reparations are distinctive in that they directly address the circumstances and needs of the victims. When effectively designed, reparations acknowledge victims' suffering, provide redress, and may include compensation for harms endured. Reparations may be both material and symbolic. Material reparations can include financial compensation, restitution of property, or access to services, while symbolic measures may take the form of public acknowledgments or official apologies for past violations, reflecting a state and societal commitment to address prior abuses. Proponents of reparations argue that to be effective, they must be employed alongside other transitional justice measures, including criminal prosecutions, truth-seeking initiatives, and institutional reforms. These complementary mechanisms help ensure that reparations do not amount to empty promises, temporary stopgap measures, or attempts to secure victims' silence through compensation alone.

== Types ==
The legal concept of reparation has two components: the victim's right to receive reparation for an injury and the responsible party's duty to provide redress. Individuals can seek reparations through judicial systems, or reparations can be provided through policies introduced by the state to address the concerns or needs of a wider populace. While the first strategy is instrumental in creating legal precedent, the second is considered more efficient.

The United Nations Basic Principles and Guidelines on the Right to a Remedy and Reparation for Victims of Gross Violations of International Human Rights Law and Serious Violations of International Humanitarian Law describes five formal categories of reparations: restitution, compensation, rehabilitation, satisfaction, and guarantees of non-repetition.

1. Restitution – measures that serve to "restore the victim to the original situation before the gross violations occurred". This may include restoration of liberty, enjoyment of human rights, identity, family life and citizenship, return of one's place of residence, restoration of employment, and return of property.
2. Compensation – the provision of compensation "for any economically assessable damage, as appropriate and proportional to the gravity of the violation and the circumstances of each case". Such damage includes physical or mental harm, lost opportunities, material damages, loss of earnings, moral damage, and the cost of legal, medical, psychological, and social services.
3. Rehabilitation – medical, psychological, and social services, and legal assistance.
4. Satisfaction – various measures that include the cessation of human rights violations and abuses, truth-seeking, searches for the disappeared, recovery and reburial of remains, judicial and administrative sanctions, public apologies, commemoration, and memorialization.
5. Guarantees of non-repetition – reforms ensuring the prevention of future abuses, including civilian control of the military and security forces, strengthening an independent judiciary, protection of civil service and human rights workers, the overall promotion of human rights standards, and the establishment of mechanisms to prevent and monitor social conflict and conflict resolution.

== Who receives reparation ==
Victims of violations of international human rights or humanitarian law have the right to prompt, sufficient, and effective reparations. Victims can be individuals or a collective group of individuals who have suffered similar violations. Descendants of victims also have rights to reparations for injustices that affected the emotional and financial well-being of the deceased's family members. Such victims, as defined by the UN Basic Principles on the matter, include:

"Persons who individually or collectively suffered harm, including physical or mental injury, emotional suffering, economic loss, or substantial impairment of their fundamental rights, through acts or omissions that constitute gross violations of international human rights law, or serious violations of international humanitarian law… the immediate family or dependents of the direct victim and persons who have suffered harm in intervening to assist victims in distress or to prevent victimization."

== Who provides reparation ==
In political and legal theory, the state is held responsible for ensuring the protection of human rights and the administration of justice within its borders; consequently, it bears the duty of providing redress for abuses and injustices suffered by its citizens. The UN Basic Principles state that if a person or entity other than the state is found liable for the violations and abuses endured, that party is responsible for providing reparation directly to the victim. When the responsible party is unable or unwilling to do so the Principles provide for states to provide interim redress or establish mechanisms to recover compensation from the liable party.

The international legal basis for the right to an effective remedy and the duty to provide reparation can be found in multiple human rights and humanitarian treaties and conventions, including:

1. The Universal Declaration of Human Rights – Article 8
2. The International Covenant on Civil and Political Rights – Article 2
3. The International Convention on the Elimination of All Forms of Racial Discrimination – Article 6
4. The United Nations Convention Against Torture – Article 14
5. The Convention on the Rights of the Child – Article 39
6. The Hague Conventions respecting the Laws and Customs of War on Land – Article 3
7. Protocol Additional to the Geneva Conventions relating to the Protection of Victims of International Armed Conflicts – Article 91
8. The Rome Statute of the International Criminal Court (ICC) – Articles 79 and 75

== Examples of reparations programs ==
=== Argentina ===
The Argentine government provided reparations to victims of human rights abuses suffered under the military dictatorship during the period 1975–1983.

=== Canada ===
For more than 100 years, Canada retained a practice of removing Indigenous Canadian children from their families and placing them in church-run Indian residential schools (IRS). This process was part of an effort to homogenize Canadian society and included the prohibition of native languages and cultural practices. In 1991, the Canadian government established the Royal Commission on Aboriginal Peoples (RCAP), which was charged with exploring the relationship among Aboriginal peoples, the government, and society.

As a result of the commission's recommendations, the government symbolically issued an apology in a "Statement of Reconciliation", admitting that the schools were designed on racist models of assimilation. Pope Benedict XVI also issued an apology on behalf of church members who were involved in the practice. In addition, the government provided a $350 million fund to help those affected by the schools. In 2006, the federal government signed the Indian Residential Schools Settlement Agreement, agreeing to provide reparations to survivors of this program. The settlement totals approximately $2 billion and includes financial compensation, a truth commission, and support services.

In 2017, Prime Minister Justin Trudeau apologized to lesbian, gay, bisexual, and transgender people in Canada in the House of Commons and announced reparations that would be made to citizens who were injured by specific actions of the State.

=== Chile ===
In 1990, Chile's newly elected president Patricio Aylwin created the National Truth and Reconciliation Commission to investigate the human rights abuses of General Augusto Pinochet's 1973–1990 dictatorial regime. The commission investigated disappearances, political executions, and torture, publishing the Rettig Report with its findings in 1991. Afterward, its work was continued by the National Corporation for Reparations and Reconciliation. These programs recommended reparations for the victims, including monthly pensions, educational benefits for the children of the disappeared, exemption from military service, and priority access to health services.

However, these initiatives have also been criticized on a variety of grounds, such as their refusal to identify the perpetrators of violence and their failure to recognize a comprehensive range of victims to whom reparations are due.

=== Japan ===
During WWII, the Imperial Japanese Army created the jugun ianfu (comfort women) system and carried out the Rape of Nanjing. Japanese soldiers committed numerous war crimes against civilians, including the mass rape and murder of over 200,000 Southeast Asian women. These women, some as young as twelve years old, were coerced and abducted from their homes and placed in military-controlled facilities where they would serve as sex slaves to the imperial army. Japan issued a public apology in 1984; however, it did not attempt to restore or redress the victims (or their families and descendants) of the atrocity.

In 1991, surviving Korean comfort women filed a lawsuit against the Imperial Japanese Army, and in 1998, three comfort women were awarded $2,300 (US) each. As a result of additional lawsuits, Japan appointed a committee to investigate the issue of comfort women and address further attempts at redress.

To provide financial compensation to victims, the committee established the Asian Women's Fund, which collected donations from private individuals and organizations, as well as the government, to aid comfort women and support contemporary women's issues. This fund also served as a form of emotional redress, representing the Japanese people's remorse for the imperial army's actions.

=== Morocco ===
In Morocco, the period between the 1960s and 1990s is often referred to as the "years of lead," referring to the massive human rights violations that occurred during the government's campaign of political oppression, including executions, torture, and the annihilation of other civil liberties. Shortly after he ascended the throne in 1999, King Mohammed VI created the Independent Arbitration Commission (IAC) to compensate the victims of forced disappearances and arbitrary detention. The IAC decided more than 5,000 cases and awarded a total of US$100 million. Still, victims and their families complained of a lack of transparency in the tribunal's procedures and demanded truth-seeking measures in addition to financial compensation.

These pressures led to the 2004 creation of the Arab world's first official truth-seeking initiative, the Equity and Reconciliation Commission. The IER issued a reparations policy that upheld notions of gender equity and resulted in roughly US$85 million in financial compensation paid to almost 10,000 individuals, as well as recommendations for other measures, such as providing health care and restoring civil rights. The IER's recommendations also led to a collective reparations program that combined symbolic recognition of human rights violations with a development component in eleven regions that had suffered from collective punishment. As of May 2010, implementation of the collective reparations program was ongoing.

Other reparations programs have been proposed or implemented in Argentina, Brazil, Cambodia, Colombia, the Democratic Republic of Congo, East Timor, El Salvador, Germany, Ghana, Guatemala, Haiti, Iraq, Malawi, Liberia, South Africa, Kenya, the United States, and others.

=== United States ===
After the attack on Pearl Harbor, Japanese Americans became targets of exclusionary policies by the US and were viewed as "threats to national security." Japanese Americans were forced into military internment camps across the West Coast and suffered trauma.

Internment came to an end with an executive order from President Roosevelt to close the camps, along with an Ex Parte Endo ruling from the Supreme Court in December 1944. This ruling restored the civil liberties of Japanese Americans and held that citizens could not be detained without due process of law. In 1948, the United States Congress passed legislation allowing minimal compensation for documented financial losses suffered by internees during internment. Congress established the Commission on Wartime Relocation and Internment of Civilians in 1980, which addressed the need for more extensive financial redress to the victims of the internment camps and concluded that internment was based on racism rather than national security.

The United States also apologized and acknowledged the injustices of the Internment of Japanese Americans through the Civil Liberties Act of 1988. The US also sponsored public education reforms to teach citizens about the harms done to Japanese Americans to secure the event in national memory. Finally, financial reparations were provided on August 10, 1988, after President Ronald Reagan signed a bill authorizing payments of $20,000 to survivors of the camps.

=== Italy ===
Italy paid Libya US$5 billion as part of the Italy–Libya Friendship Treaty of 2008 as reparation for Italian colonization of Libya, and both sides declared "now settled and resolved".

== Dignity takings and dignity restoration ==
A dignity taking is the destruction or confiscation of property rights from owners or occupiers where the intentional or unintentional outcome is dehumanization or infantilization. There are two requirements: (1) involuntary property destruction or confiscation and (2) dehumanization or infantilization. Dehumanization is "the failure to recognize an individual or group's humanity" and infantilization is "the restriction of an individual or group's autonomy based on the failure to recognize and respect their full capacity to reason". Evidence of a dignity taking can be established empirically through either a top-down approach, examining the motive and intent behind those who initiated the taking, or a bottom-up approach, examining the viewpoints of dispossessed people.

When this larger harm, called a dignity taking, occurs, mere reparations (or compensation for physical things taken) are not enough. Dignity restoration is required. Dignity restoration is a remedy that seeks to provide dispossessed individuals and communities with material compensation through processes that affirm their humanity and reinforce their agency. In practical terms, the remedial process places dispossessed individuals or communities in the driver's seat and gives them a significant degree of autonomy in deciding how they are made whole.

Professor Bernadette Atuahene first created the dignity takings/dignity restoration framework following her empirical exploration of land dispossession and restitution in South Africa in her book, We Want What's Ours: Learning from South Africa's Restitution Program (Oxford University Press 2014). Since then, many scholars across disciplines have applied these socio-legal concepts to an array of case studies in various time periods and geographic locations, providing a transnational, historicized approach to understanding involuntary property loss and its material and non-material consequences.

The dignity takings/dignity restoration framework provides a lexicon to describe and analyze property takings from poor and vulnerable populations across the globe in different historical periods; focuses on redress by linking events of property dispossession to highlight opportunities for learning, resistance, and solidarity; allows people who are not property scholars to participate in the conversation about involuntary property loss and adequate remedies; captures both the material and immaterial consequences of property confiscation; and inserts dignity into the scholarly discourse about property, countering the singular focus on efficiency that has dominated legal analysis since the ascendancy of law and economics.

== Potential problems ==
There are logistical problems inherent in reparations, such as clearly defining the objectives, goals, and processes for distributing reparations, determining how to address a range of atrocities through streamlined programs, and balancing economic development with financing reparations efforts. Some experts suggest that the problems lie in the very definition of reparations.

The right to seek and obtain reparations is vested in the state whose citizens suffered the losses, but individuals are barred from pursuing a claim for compensation directly against the state that wronged them. The grant of reparations is thus a political question, and individuals who suffered harm may be left undercompensated or uncompensated.

The UN's guidelines on reparations could be contested on the grounds that they equate human rights violations with violations of civil and political rights, ignoring abuses of economic, social, and cultural rights. The guidelines explicitly state that they intend to restore victims to their status in a time of peace, but the distribution of rights and resources often was not equal in peacetime. Thus, reparations, if they are intended to return a society to its status quo, run the risk of ignoring systemic oppression and reproducing social hierarchies.

For instance, reparations programs have been critiqued for ignoring the needs of women in transitional justice processes. In 2007, women's groups mobilized to examine how reparations policies could be more responsive to victims of gender-based violence. Their efforts led to the "Nairobi Declaration on Women's and Girls' Right to a Remedy and Reparation," which states that "reparations must go above and beyond the immediate reasons and consequences of the crimes and violations; they must aim to address the political and structural inequalities that negatively shape women's and girls' lives."

Some of these concerns can be addressed by empowering women to have a voice in the reparations process, challenging discriminatory practices, and educating communities about sexual violence.

In addition to gender-based discrimination, children are often excluded from reparations procedures. The reasons for this are varied; reparations often fall into the hands of parents and are only indirectly given to children, and reparations programs often do not take into account the fact that children and adults are affected differently by violence. Thus, reparations should also have a child-specific component to target abuses that children specifically suffer.

== See also ==
- Reparations for slavery
- Holocaust reparations
- Restorative justice
