= Law in action =

Law in action is a legal theory, associated with legal realism, that examines the role of law, not just as it exists in the statutes and cases, but as it is actually applied in society. Law in action scholars often start with observations about the behavior of institutions and work "backwards" toward the legal philosophies guiding courts and traditional jurisprudence. As Kenneth B. Davis, Jr., Dean of the University of Wisconsin Law School has stated, "'Law in Action' . . . means that in teaching and research, no matter how interesting we find a legal theory, we always need to ask, 'How does this affect people's lives in the real world?'"

== History ==
The first reference to Law in Action may have been a 1910 article by Roscoe Pound, the Harvard Law School dean whose work was a forerunner to the legal realism movement. From there, the concept caught hold at the University of Wisconsin Law School, where the law in action concept is most prevalent today. The law in action concept was a natural fit for Wisconsin because of its strong emphasis on the social sciences and the Wisconsin Idea—the concept that the boundaries of campus are the boundaries of the state.

== Teaching law in action ==
As at law schools everywhere, the focus is on appellate opinions. However, a professor who focuses on law in action is likely to go past the holding of the case to look at more questions such as "How might the parties on the losing end of the case respond?" "Will the rule change their future behavior?" "Who will enforce the rule?" or "What was the cause of the underlying dispute?" will be addressed Similarly, clinical education and clinical skills courses take on a more important role for students, who get to integrate their personal experiences with the classroom work.

== See also ==
- Sociology of Law
- Law and economics
- Legal realism
- Natural law
