= Frank J. Remington =

- Born: February 10, 1922
- Died: February 9, 1996 (aged 73)
- Monuments: Frank J. Remington Center law clinic at the University of Wisconsin Law School
- Education: University of Wisconsin–Madison; University of Wisconsin Law School
- Occupation: Professor
- Employer: University of Wisconsin Law School
- Military career
- Allegiance: United States
- Conflicts: World War II
- Awards: Distinguished Flying Cross

Frank John Remington (February 10, 1922 – February 9, 1996), was a University of Wisconsin law professor, who directed major studies reforming criminal law in the United States.

He was a member of the Supreme Court's Standing Committee on Federal Rules and Procedures for 23 years, directed a 1961 study of criminal justice administration for the American Bar Foundation and headed an American Bar Association project to develop standards for the police. He was also a consultant to the President's Commission on Law Enforcement under Lyndon B. Johnson and to the Kerner Commission on Civil Disorders in 1968.

== Career ==
He attended the University of Wisconsin–Madison, interrupting his undergraduate studies for World War II service as C-47 pilot, for which he received the Distinguished Flying Cross. He attended law school there also, and joined the faculty upon his graduation in 1949.

He headed the project rewriting Wisconsin's criminal law system; this project was to become a model for other states and the Federal Government. He then participated in the development of the American Law Institute's Model Penal Code, and was subsequently director of the American Bar Foundation 1961 study on improving the day-to-day administration of the criminal justice system outside the courtroom.

Remington was for many years Wisconsin's faculty representative to the Big Ten and the National Collegiate Athletic Association, and was a member of the NCAA's committee on infractions. He was chairman of that committee when it unanimously imposed the first "death penalty" on an athletic program, the Southern Methodist University football program, guilty of two rounds of major infractions within five years. The committee forced SMU to abandon football altogether for the 1987 season, and revive the sport only under severe restrictions.

== Legacy and influence ==
One of the University of Wisconsin Law School's clinical centers is named after him, the Frank J. Remington Center. The center's clinics specialize in criminal law, and they include the Legal Assistance to Incarcerated People (LAIP) Project, the Oxford Federal Project, and the Wisconsin Innocence Project, among others.
