= Dignity restoration =

Sociological framework

Dignity restoration is a form of reparations that provides material compensation to dispossessed individuals and communities through processes that affirm their humanity and reinforce their agency. Dignity restoration is most commonly understood as a remedy for a related concept, dignity taking – when a state directly or indirectly destroys or confiscates property rights from owners or occupiers and the intentional or unintentional outcome is dehumanization or infantilization.

== Background ==
The dignity takings/dignity restoration framework was first created by Professor Bernadette Atuahene following her empirical exploration of South Africa’s land dispossession and restitution in her book, We Want What’s Ours: Learning from South Africa’s Restitution Program (Oxford University Press 2014). Atuahene viewed dignity taking as when a state directly or indirectly destroys or confiscates property rights from people, resulting in dehumanization or infantilization. Atauhene viewed restitution for this as not limited to reparations (compensation for material things confiscated), but also dignity restoration, or providing dispossessed individuals and communities with material compensation that affirms their humanity and reinforces their agency. Dignity restoration gives the dispossessed individuals or communities a significant degree of autonomy in deciding how they are made whole. The concept of dignity restoration “provides a language and space to discuss how to best remedy a dignity taking, while reimagining the purpose and potential of redress.” Since Atuahene's article, numerous scholars across disciplines have since applied these socio-legal concepts to an array of case studies in various time periods and geographic locations.

== Characteristics of dignity restoration ==
=== Importance of autonomy ===
Dignity restoration emphasizes the importance of autonomy in addition to material reparations. For example, sociologist and legal scholar Cesar Rosado conducted ethnographic work in a Chicago worker center called Arise, which services undocumented workers as well as other vulnerable laborers. He concluded that claims of unpaid wages are often deprivations of property that constitute a dignity taking, and that laws protecting workers’ right to organize are an essential backdrop for dignity restoration because they allow workers (sometimes aided by worker centers) to more effectively fight for redress. In another example, legal scholar Eva Pils described how China’s forced evictions of rural homeowners to create space for its rapidly expanding cities qualified as a dignity taking. According to Pils, the Chinese government’s monetary compensation and resettlement schemes did not meet the dignity restoration threshold. Although dangerous, Pils described how extrajudicial resistance to forced property seizures may ultimately contribute to dignity restoration.

=== Separation vs. reintegration ===
Dignity restoration does not, as a rule, need to include the reintegration of a dispossessed population, as scholars have argued that embracing this population’s autonomy can result in greater sovereignty and long-term restitution for them. Anthropologist Justin Richland is credited with updating the definition of a dignity restoration to: a remedy that seeks to provide dispossessed individuals and communities with material compensation through processes that affirm their humanity and reinforce their agency, whereas the original definition included the purpose of dignity restoration as to “rehabilitate dispossessed populations and reintegrate them into the fabric of society through an emphasis on process.” Richland viewed the separation of Hopi people from their tribal lands centuries ago, and the continued degradation of these lands by the U.S. Forest Service, as an instance where dignity restoration can embrace more separation and autonomy as opposed to reintegration.

=== Iterative process ===
Multiple rounds of dignity restoration are often necessary because circumstances may not allow for an immediate and comprehensive remedy. Dutch legal scholar Wouter Veraart viewed the multiple rounds of compensation offered to Jews in France and the Netherlands following the Holocaust as an example of this. The first round focused on restoring legal equality to people who had just been thoroughly dehumanized. The second round shifted the focus from solely monetary remedies for individual harms to monetary and moral remedies for group harms.

The iterative nature of dignity restoration is also illustrated by legal scholar Alfred Brophy in his case study of the 1921 Tulsa race massacre, which involved the looting, burning, and destruction of African American property in Greenwood District, Tulsa, Oklahoma following the community’s resistance to an extrajudicial lynching. The first round of dignity restoration occurred throughout the course of the twentieth century with America’s gradual establishment of African Americans as rights bearing citizens. The second round began 75 years after the Riot when the Oklahoma Legislature passed the 1921 Tulsa Race Riot Reconciliation Act of 2001, which created a memorial, provided college scholarships for descendants of those affected, and allocated funds for economic development in Greenwood. In this case, dignity restoration began with the restoration of dignity, and the victims and their descendants achieved property restoration three quarters of a century later.

Similarly, in the context of police misconduct in the United States, legal historian John Acevedo emphasized the value of robust remedies like community reparations and the need to use monetary awards to victims and their families or a formal investigation by a state entity—the two most common responses to extralegal police violence--as merely the first step to achieving full dignity restoration.

== Examples of full or partial dignity restoration ==
=== The American Revolutionary War and Loyalists ===
During the American Revolutionary War, the nascent government subjected Loyalists to a dignity taking by expropriating their properties, revoking their professional licenses, annulling their civil and political rights, and detaining and banishing them--a form of “civil death.” Even after renouncing their allegiances, most Loyalists either did not receive their property, had to repurchase it, or had to pay fines. This case study illustrates that sometimes there is only partial dignity restoration: a restoration of dignity without a restoration of property.

=== American slavery and the Freedmen’s Bureau ===
Legal scholar Taja-Nia Henderson concluded that the Freedmen’s Bureau both restored and deprived formerly enslaved Americans of their dignity. Unpaid wages in the context of American slavery is a clear example of a dignity taking. Slaveholders stole labor and its accompanying wage from African Americans during chattel slavery. At face, the Freedmen’s Bureau spurred dignity restoration during Reconstruction because it was the federal agency charged with assisting African Americans as they transitioned from being slaves to free people. It was among the first state institutions created to defend the rights of African Americans. In reality, however, the Bureau was at once a dignity giving and dignity depriving institution--it sometimes defended the rights of former slaves and other times it helped plantation owners bolster the status quo by ensuring African Americans remained a pliant agricultural workforce.

Los Angeles King-Drew Hospital

University of Pennsylvania legal scholar Shaun Ossei-Owusu wrote that federal regulators shut down Los Angeles’ King-Drew Hospital in 2007 and contributed to the ongoing trend of urban hospital closings in low-income communities. Per Ossei-Uwusu's article, by failing to replace or improve King-Drew Hospital, the government left the community without a medical center that served everyone regardless of insurance and this involuntary loss of community property constituted a dignity taking. In 2015, the hospital reopened on a smaller scale—but without its renowned trauma center, still leaving the community void of a critical service. The hospital’s partial re-opening was seen as a small step towards full dignity restoration.

=== Chicago’s Police Torture Scandal (1972–1991) ===
Hisotrian Andrew Baer established Chicago’s police torture scandal, perpetrated from 1972 and 1991 by Jon Burge and a coterie of white detectives, as a clear-cut example of a dignity taking. As part of the remedy, social movement organizers built opportunities for victims and their descendents to restore their dignity by actively participating in the fight for justice and reparations. Eventually, in 2015, the organizers secured dignity restoration through the Chicago Police Torture Reparations Ordinance, a city law that distributed nearly $100,000 for each of the 57 named victims, psychological counseling, healthcare, vocational training, an apology, public memorial, community center, public school curriculum to educate youth about the scandal, and free tuition to city’s colleges for survivors and their families.

=== Dispossession of South Carolina’s sea islands ===
Historian Andrew Kahrl has written that while the dispossession in South Carolina’s sea islands was executed in a legal fashion, the mechanisms predatory property tax lien investors used to manipulate property tax delinquency laws and seize homes from African Americans constituted a dignity taking. Victims had to present themselves before a judge as a dumb, infantile, unsuspecting victim deserving of sympathy in order to get redress from the judicial system. That is, to recover their property they often had to sacrifice their dignity. Legal scholar Andrew Kahrl suggests that full dignity restoration requires punishment of the perpetrators as well as measures to allay the predatory practices that enabled the unjust dispossession.

=== Matrimonial property in Southern Nigeria ===
According to legal scholar Anthony Diala, the customary law in southern Nigeria that governs the unequal division of matrimonial property following divorce is, in effect, a dignity taking. In following the customary law, women are simultaneously infantilized and deprived of their rightful property. To remedy this harm, the Nigerian government created the Social Welfare Department, an agency that orders men to divide matrimonial property and/or pay compensation to women. Their quasi-judicial orders potentially contribute to dignity restoration by modifying local customs.

=== Employment discrimination in the United States ===
In the United States, the Equal Employment Opportunity Commission and its state equivalents can be viewed as entities that both perpetuate dignity takings and occasionally restore dignity. According to legal scholars Laura B. Nielsen, Ellen C. Berrey, and Robert L. Nelson, the risk of workplace retaliation and termination, which arises from the official filing of a discrimination claim, may exacerbate the dignity taking. However, a courtroom victory may provide an avenue for dignity restoration, but such victories are rare as parties settle most discrimination suits. These out of court settlements, despite serving as a form of monetary reparations, fail to restore the employee’s dignity in full.

=== Criminalization of homosexuality in Kenya ===
According to political scientist Ari Shaw, the criminalization of same-sex conduct in Kenya is a clear example of a dignity taking. In an effort to restore their dignity, Kenyan LGBT activists have imported global human rights norms and used the African regional human rights system. Through public grassroots activism, these non-state actors can assert their agency, which results in partial dignity restoration. Full dignity restoration has not yet occurred in Shaw's framework, because homosexuality remains illegal in Kenya.

== Examples of dignity restoration without dignity takings ==
=== Colombia’s Civil War ===
Colombia’s ongoing civil war has killed and displaced millions of its citizens. Colombian legal scholar Diane Guzman applied the dignity takings framework to the associated deprivation of land, housing, and other property, which involved dehumanization and infantilization. But even in instances when there was no dignity taking and only property deprivation, Guzman argued that dignity restoration is still required because it is not only an adequate remedy for dignity takings but also a suitable remedy for other types of massive human rights abuses. Guzman also linked the conception of transformative reparations—embedded in Colombia’s land restitution law—with the idea of dignity restoration. Relying on a sample of judicial opinions from Colombia’s land restitution court to understand transformative restitution, she claimed the main difference is that “while transformative restitution aims to transform social injustices, dignity restoration focuses on reaffirming victims’ humanity and reestablishing their agency”

=== Racially restrictive covenants ===
Racially restrictive covenants do not qualify as a dignity taking, according to legal historian Carol Rose, because they only involve lost opportunity to acquire property rather than lost property. But even when a dignity taking has not occurred, dignity restoration is still possible through public and private actions. For example, homeowners renounced racially restrictive covenants in their deeds, the Supreme Court outlawed racially restrictive covenants in Shelley v. Kraemer (1948), Congress passed the Fair Housing Act (1968), and many local legislatures passed other laws invalidating the racial covenants.

== Potential challenges to dignity restoration ==
Sometimes, efforts to achieve the more robust remedy of dignity restoration, leaves communities with nothing at all.

The Popela community in South Africa suffered a dignity taking from the forced transfer of community land rights by colonial powers. To remedy this harm, the Constitutional Court of South Africa demanded that the state return the land to the Popela community. In an effort to go above and beyond the court-ordered remedy and achieve dignity restoration, the state expanded the number of land recipients and the size of land transferred to each. Research by legal scholars Bernadette Atuahene and Sanele Sibanda, however, claimed that the state's well-intentioned efforts fell short, as the state did not follow through on reparations mandated by the court order and its more ambitious plan to achieve dignity restoration.

Ethnomusicologist Gianpaolo Chiriaco, has studied how existing sound repatriation literature enriches our understanding of dignity restoration. Ethnomusicologists have, for decades, recorded sound from foreign lands and archived it in university libraries and other institutions that the recorded individuals cannot access. Sound repatriation—the process of giving the recorded populations access to their cultural property—is a form of dignity restoration. It manifests differently in each circumstance because scholars have to make several decisions such as who gets the material, whether to make public ceremonial recordings not meant for the uninitiated, and who holds the intellectual property rights to the material. Consequently, dignity restoration, with respect to sound recordings, is challenging.

== See also ==
- Dignity taking
- Reparations
- Political rehabilitation
