= Bernadette Atuahene =

American property law scholar, professor of law, and author

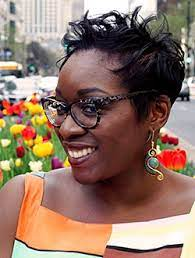
- Occupations: professor of law, author
- Title: James E. Jones Chair

Academic background
- Education: University of California, Los Angeles (BS); Harvard University (MPA); Yale University (JD)

Academic work
- Discipline: Property law scholar
- Institutions: University of Wisconsin Law School; Chicago-Kent College of Law
- Notable works: We Want What's Ours: Learning from South Africa's Land Restitution Program
- Notable ideas: Dignity takings

Bernadette Atuahene is an American professor of law, property law scholar, and author. She is the inaugural James E. Jones Chair at the University of Wisconsin Law School, and previously was a professor at Chicago-Kent College of Law and a research professor for the American Bar Foundation.

Atuahene is the author of We Want What's Ours: Learning from South Africa's Land Restitution Program, a 2014 ethnography of the post-apartheid land restitution program, and won the 2020 John Hope Franklin Award from the Law and Society Association for her California Law Review article "Predatory Cities," based on her 2018 ethnography of property tax assessments in Detroit. She has also advocated with community groups in Detroit for government action on property taxes.

== Early life and education ==
Atuahene was raised in Los Angeles by Ghanaian parents, and completed her B.A. from the University of California, Los Angeles in 1997, as well as an M.P.A. from the Harvard Kennedy School of Government at Harvard University and her J.D. from Yale Law School in 2002.

== Career ==
As a Fulbright scholar, Atuahene was a judicial clerk at the Constitutional Court of South Africa. She was then an associate at Cleary, Gottlieb, Steen & Hamilton in New York before becoming faculty at Chicago-Kent College of Law in 2005. In 2007, she also became an American Bar Foundation (ABF) faculty fellow. In 2008, she won a Council on Foreign Relations International Affairs fellowship and went to South Africa to conduct ethnographic research related to the post-apartheid land restitution program that later became the basis for her 2014 book We Want What’s Ours: Learning from South Africa's Land Restitution Program.

In 2016, Atuahene won a National Science Foundation grant for research sponsored by the ABF and focused on squatters in Detroit. She also became an ABF research professor in 2016. In 2017, while she was a visiting professor at Wayne State University Law School, Atuahene and the Illinois Institute of Technology led research into Detroit foreclosures and she co-authored a study on inflated property assessments in Detroit with Tim Hodge, a professor of economics at Oakland University. The study was published in the Southern California Law Review and found between 2008 and 2015, more than half of homes were assessed at amounts greater than allowed by the Michigan constitution, and nearly all of the lowest priced homes were assessed at more than the constitutional limit.

As part of the grassroots Coalition to End Unconstitutional Tax Foreclosures in 2018, Atuahene called for government action to redress what she described as "unconstitutional assessments, which have led to illegally-inflated property taxes that people could not afford to pay, and so they were evicted from their homes in record numbers for property taxes they weren't supposed to be paying in the first place." In January 2020, The Detroit News published an investigation that found overassessments and overtaxation of Detroit homeowners between 2010 and 2016.

Atuahene was awarded the 2020 John Hope Franklin Award from the Law and Society Association for her February 2020 California Law Review article "Predatory Cities," which introduced the sociolegal concept of "predatory cities," based on her ethnography of property tax assessments in Detroit.

In 2020, Atuahene was an organizer and advocate for the Detroit grassroots community organization Coalition for Property Tax Justice, which lobbied for the creation of a property tax compensation fund for overtaxed homeowners. In 2021, she described the creation of the Detroit Tax Relief Fund as "a good first step." In 2022, she continued to advocate with the Coalition for Property Tax Justice for an end to property tax overassessments.

In 2022, Atuahene became the inaugural James E. Jones Chair at the University of Wisconsin Law School. Her next book, Predatory Cities: Replenishing the Public Purse Through Racist Policy, is expected in 2023.

On September 16, 2024, she was one of four faculty members endowed as the Frances R. and John J. Duggan Professor of Law. [17]

As of 2025 she holds the Duggan Chair at the University of Southern California Gould School of Law.

Her book, Plundered: How Racist Policies Undermine Black Homeownership in America was released January 28, 2025. In her book, she highlights predadtory governance, an epidemic with major consequences for Black communities in America, pointing out racist policies that cause racial inequalities.

== We Want What's Ours: Learning from South Africa's Land Restitution Program ==
We Want What's Ours: Learning from South Africa's Land Restitution Program was published by Oxford University Press in 2014. To develop the book, Atuahene conducted an ethnographic field study of the land restitution program in post-apartheid South Africa, with support and institutional review from the American Bar Foundation and Chicago-Kent College of Law.

The research conducted by Atuahene included interviews with land restitution claimants and government workers who administered the program. Laura Seay writes in The Washington Post, "Plenty of academic works have been written on the problem of land rights in South Africa, but Atuahene's contribution is unique" and "She explores an aspect of property rights that is too often ignored, but that is of particular importance in considering the full effects, physical and psychological, of systems of oppression."

In a review for the International Journal on Minority and Group Rights, Jonnette Watson Hamilton writes, "Atuahene's starting premise is that more than financial well-being and property were lost as a result of apartheid and the highly racialized deprivations of land in South Africa; there were harms to human dignity as well", and that Atuahene has "coined the term "dignity takings" for situations "when a state directly or indirectly destroys or confiscates property rights from owners or occupiers whom it deems to be sub persons without paying just compensation and without a legitimate public purpose.""

Eleanor Marie Lawrence Brown writes in a review for Michigan Law Review that Atuahene built upon previous work by Carol M. Rose, who has examined other "extraordinary" takings, where "the state takes away property without just compensation and simultaneously makes a point about a person or a group's standing in the community of citizens."

== Awards ==
- LSA 2024 Annual Awards, Law and Society Association Article Prize for “A Theory of Stategraft”
- National Science Foundation award

== Selected works ==
- Atuahene, Bernadette (2014). We Want What's Ours: Learning from South Africa's Land Restitution Program (First ed.). Oxford: Oxford University Press. ISBN 97-80-19871463-7.
- Atuahene, Bernadette (Fall 2016). "Dignity Takings and Dignity Restoration: Creating a New Theoretical Framework for Understanding Involuntary Property Loss and the Remedies Required". Law & Social Inquiry. 41 (4): 796–823. doi:10.1111/lsi.12249. S2CID 151377162.
- Atuahene, Bernadette; Hodge, Timothy R. (January 2, 2018). "Stategraft". Southern California Law Review. 91 (2).
- Atuahene, Bernadette, ed. (2018). "Dignity Takings and Dignity Restoration". Chicago-Kent Law Review. 92 (3).
- Atuahene, Bernadette; Berry, Christopher R. (2019). "Taxed Out: Illegal Property Tax Assessments and the Epidemic of Tax Foreclosures in Detroit". UC Irvine Law Review. 9: 847–886. doi:10.2139/ssrn.3202860. S2CID 158726080.
- Atuahene, Bernadette (February 2020). "Predatory Cities". California Law Review. 108 (1).
- Atuahene, Bernadette (June 11, 2020). "Opinion | The Scandal of the Predatory City". The New York Times.
- Atuahene, Bernadette (January 28, 2025). Plundered: How Racist Policies Undermine Black Homeownership in America
