= Infantilization =

Treating someone as if they were younger

Infantilization (in American English) or infantilisation (in British English) is the prolonged treatment of someone as if they are much younger than they really are. Studies have shown that an individual, when infantilized, is overwhelmingly likely to feel disrespected. Such individuals may report a sense of transgression akin to dehumanization.

== Racism ==
Infantilization is an important concept that was pivotal to maintaining slavery – children of enslaved women would also be enslaved because both belonged to the master. Africans were considered "child races", resulting in subsequent infantilization.

When black men respond negatively to "boy", the negative response is caused by infantilization. Infantilization plays a role in implicit bias, which is a modern effect caused by subjugation, primarily economically, by failing to honor the work and creativity of subjugated populations. Infantilization can be used by propaganda to remove factual contributions from subjugated communities. This is done by individuals who would rather believe what fits within their belief system than truly hear information that may counter existing beliefs.

== Ableism ==
Disabled individuals can be infantilized in their interactions with non-disabled people. That can occur alongside other paternalistic behaviours and denies individuals their autonomy. Infantilization is more commonly experienced by people who are visually disabled (e.g., people who are visually impaired).

Another specific disability often infantilized is autism, which is often viewed solely as a children's disorder, and was historically researched in mainly children. The extreme focus on children essentially denies the existence of autistic adults within public consciousness, many autistic adults have traits associated with children too, such as childish interests, young sounding voices, low emotional regulation and underdeveloped social skills leading to many people unknowingly discriminating against autistic adults by infantilisation.

== Ageism ==
=== Older adults ===
Infantilization can happen to older adults, which leads to denying them autonomy in their care, such as through being excessively controlled or being addressed with baby talk, as if they were a small child incapable of understanding complex topics. This leads to a reduced quality of care. From a patient's perspective, this is seen as disrespectful and patronizing. Infantilization can also occur as an aspect of intimate partner violence, as some abusive partners substitute physical violence for psychological abuse to maintain their power.

=== Youth ===
When used in reference to adolescents, the term typically suggests that teenagers and their potential are underestimated in modern society. It can also be used to describe adolescents being regarded as though they are younger than their actual age. Infantilization may also refer to a process when a teen or adolescent is being treated in a manner appropriate only for children.

Robert Epstein is a notable critic of the treatment of youth and adolescents, suggesting that many public policymakers and neuroscientists utilize myths about the teenage brain in order to disenfranchise and ultimately infantilize them.

Infantilization of young people may also refer to people calling them "children" or "kids", as some people mix up the two age groups.

== Property law ==
In property law, infantilization is defined as "the restriction of an individual's or group's autonomy based on the failure to recognize and respect their full capacity to reason". When infantilization is coupled with property takeover, the result is a dignity taking.

There are several examples of dignity takings, including wage theft from undocumented workers in which the power imbalance allows employers to rob workers of their agency and avenues for redress; the dispossession of property from African Americans in the South Carolina sea islands by predatory tax buyers, who routinely infantilized their victims by overwhelming them with paperwork and timelines to accelerate foreclosures; and the unequal division of matrimonial property in southern Nigeria after divorce that assumes women are less capable of managing property and thus infantilizes them.

== Sexism ==
Adult women are frequently referred to as girls, a term that is inherently infantilizing due to its association with children and adolescents. Infantilization is such a common feature of sexism that it is one of five dimensions of sexual harassment in a Gender Experiences Questionnaire.

Humanitarian aid can infantilize women who are displaced from their homes by depicting them simply as innocent victims, not as capable individuals with agency. Women refugees may also be depicted as helpless and unwanted.

Fictional female characters have been depicted as "overtly girly" and criticized as contributing to the infantilization of women.

== See also ==
- Condescension
- Dumbing down
- Parentification
