= Kenneth B. Davis =

American lawyer

Kenneth B. Davis, Jr.
- Born: Louisville, Kentucky
- Education: Case Western Reserve University School of Law; University of Michigan
- Awards: President's Award of Excellence, State Bar of Wisconsin; Distinguished Teaching Award, University of Wisconsin
- Scientific career
- Fields: Business Organization; Securities Regulation
- Workplaces: University of Wisconsin Law School

Kenneth B. Davis Jr. was Dean of the University of Wisconsin Law School in Madison, Wisconsin from 1997 to 2012. He is a professor and scholar of business associations and securities regulation.

== Biography ==
Appointed as the dean of UW Law in 1997, as the inaugural Fred W. and Vi Miller Dean in 2004- the university's first endowment for deanship. In 2003 he was named the George H. Young Chair. Davis previously lead a full-time faculty of over 60 and a student body of 850. Previous to his appointment as Dean, he served as Associate Dean for Academic Affairs. He has been a professor at the law school since 1978. He teaches and publishes in business organizations and securities regulation. He served as chairman of the Federal Nominating Commission assembled by Senators Kohl and Feingold for judicial vacancies in the Western District of Wisconsin. In 2011 he joined Reinhart Boerner Van Deuren legal firm as their primary legal council and as the leader of their newly introduced corporate governance and investor relations service group.

Davis was born in Louisville, Kentucky. He is a graduate of the University of Michigan and Case Western Reserve University School of Law. While at Case Western Reserve, he was editor-in-chief of the Case Western Reserve Law Review, and he graduated number one in the class of 1974. After graduation, he clerked for Chief Judge Richard H. Chambers of the U.S. Court of Appeals for the Ninth Circuit, and then began practicing in the Washington, D.C. office of Covington & Burling.

He and his wife Lindy have three children.

== Selected publications ==
- Wisconsin Business Corporation Law (with Berry, DeGuire and Williams), State Bar of Wisconsin (1992)
- The Forgotten Derivative Suit, 61 Vanderbilt Law Review 387 (2008)
- Structural Bias, Special Litigation Committees, and the Vagaries of Director Independence, 90 Iowa Law Review 1305 (2005)
- Once More, the Business Judgment Rule, 2000 Wisconsin Law Review 57
- Approval of Disinterested Directors, 20 Journal of Corporation Law 215 (1995)
- Judicial Review of Fiduciary Decisionmaking – Some Theoretical Perspectives, 80 Northwestern University Law Review 1 (1985)
