= 75th Field Artillery Regiment =

US military unit

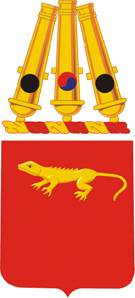
- Coat of arms
- Active: 1918
- Country: United States
- Branch: Army
- Type: Field artillery
- Motto(s): PARATUS FACERE (Prepared To Do)

Insignia
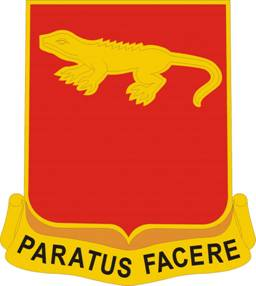
- Identification symbol

The 75th Field Artillery Regiment is a field artillery regiment of the United States Army.

== Distinctive unit insignia ==
- Description

A Gold color metal and enamel device 1 5/32 inches (2.9 cm) in height overall consisting of a shield blazoned: Gules, in chief a lizard statant Or. Attached below the shield a Gold scroll inscribed “PARATUS FACERE” in Black letters.

- Symbolism

The shield is red for Artillery, and the gold lizard represents the origin of the 75th Field Artillery in the state of Alabama, Alabama being known as the Lizard State.

- Background

The distinctive unit insignia was originally approved for the 75th Field Artillery Regiment on 8 August 1940. It was amended to correct the description on 29 August 1940. The insignia was redesignated for the 75th Field Artillery Battalion on 10 May 1941. It was redesignated for the 75th Artillery Regiment on 31 October 1958. It was redesignated for the 75th Field Artillery Regiment effective 1 September 1971. The insignia was amended to revise the description on 9 February 1973.

== Coat of arms ==
- Blazon
- Shield

Gules, in chief a lizard statant Or.

- Crest

On a wreath of the colors Or and Gules three cannon barrel muzzles adjoining at the top of the first, the outer ones charged with a gunstone the center one with a Taeguk Proper. Motto PARATUS FACERE (Prepared To Do).

  - Symbolism
- Shield

The shield is red for Artillery, and the gold lizard represents the origin of the 75th Field Artillery in the state of Alabama, Alabama being known as the Lizard State.

- Crest

The cannon barrels denote the Artillery heritage of the organization and three are used to refer to the widely separated land areas where the unit served. The outer barrels represent World War II and participation in the Aleutian Islands and Po Valley Campaigns. The center one and Taeguk refer to the Korean War, and together with the gunstones, symbolize the unit's participation in four campaigns, with the Taeguk also denoting the award of the Republic of Korea Presidential Unit Citation.

- Background

The coat of arms was originally approved for the 75th Field Artillery Regiment on 8 August 1940. It was amended to correct the wording of the blazon on 29 August 1940. The insignia was redesignated for the 75th Field Artillery Battalion on 10 May 1941. It was redesignated for the 75th Artillery Regiment on 31 October 1958. It was redesignated for the 75th Field Artillery Regiment effective 1 September 1971. The insignia was amended to add a crest on 9 February 1973.

== Current configuration ==
- 1st Battalion 75th Field Artillery Regiment (United States)
- 2nd Battalion 75th Field Artillery Regiment (United States)
- 3rd Battalion 75th Field Artillery Regiment (United States)
- 4th Battalion 75th Field Artillery Regiment (United States)
- 5th Battalion 75th Field Artillery Regiment (United States)
- 6th Battalion 75th Field Artillery Regiment (United States)

== See also ==
- Field Artillery Branch (United States)
