= American Bar Foundation =

Non-profit research institute in Chicago

- Motto: Research advancing justice
- Established: 1952
- President: Sandra J. Chan
- Budget: Revenue: $8.8 million Expenses: $8.11 million (FYE 2023)
- Address: 750 North Lake Shore Drive, Fl. 4 Chicago, IL 60611-4403
- Location: Chicago, Illinois, U.S.
- Website: americanbarfoundation.org

The American Bar Foundation (ABF) is a nonprofit research institute established in 1952 and located in Chicago, Illinois. The ABF is located in the same building as Northwestern University Pritzker School of Law in downtown Chicago. It is associated with the American Bar Association.
