= University of Wisconsin Law School =

Law school in Madison, Wisconsin, US

Coordinates: 43.074644°N 89.402435°W

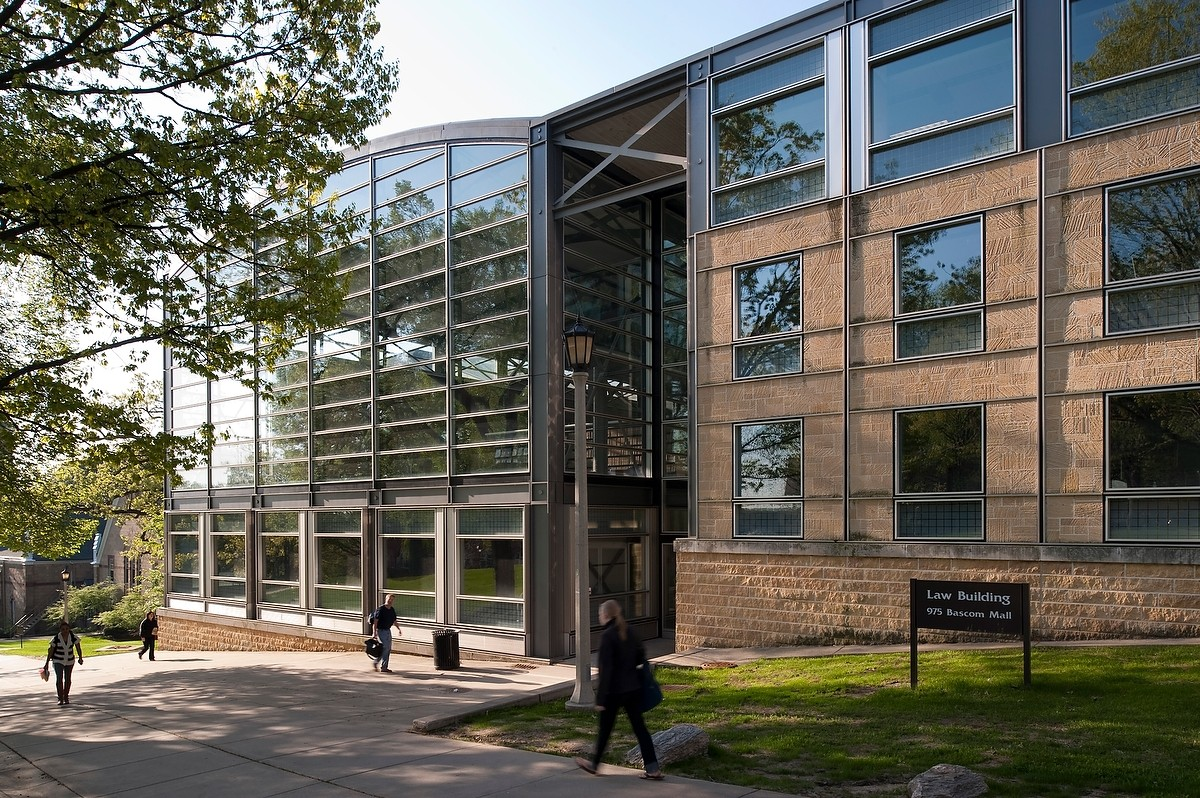
- University of Wisconsin Law Building on Bascom Hill
- Motto: "Law in Action"
- Parent school: University of Wisconsin–Madison
- Established: 1868; 158 years ago
- School type: Public law school
- Parent endowment: $3.8 billion (2023)
- Dean: Daniel Tokaji
- Location: Madison, Wisconsin, United States
- Enrollment: 698 (fall 2023)
- Faculty: 145 (fall 2022)
- USNWR ranking: 26th (tie) (2026)
- Website: law.wisc.edu
- ABA profile: Standard 509 Report

The University of Wisconsin Law School is the law school of the University of Wisconsin–Madison, a public research university in Madison, Wisconsin. Founded in 1868, the school is guided by a "law in action" legal philosophy which emphasizes the role of the law in practice and society. It offers the Juris Doctor, Master of Laws, and Doctor of Juridical Science degrees; Juris Doctor graduates of the law school receive admission to the Wisconsin bar without taking a traditional bar examination via diploma privilege.

== Building ==
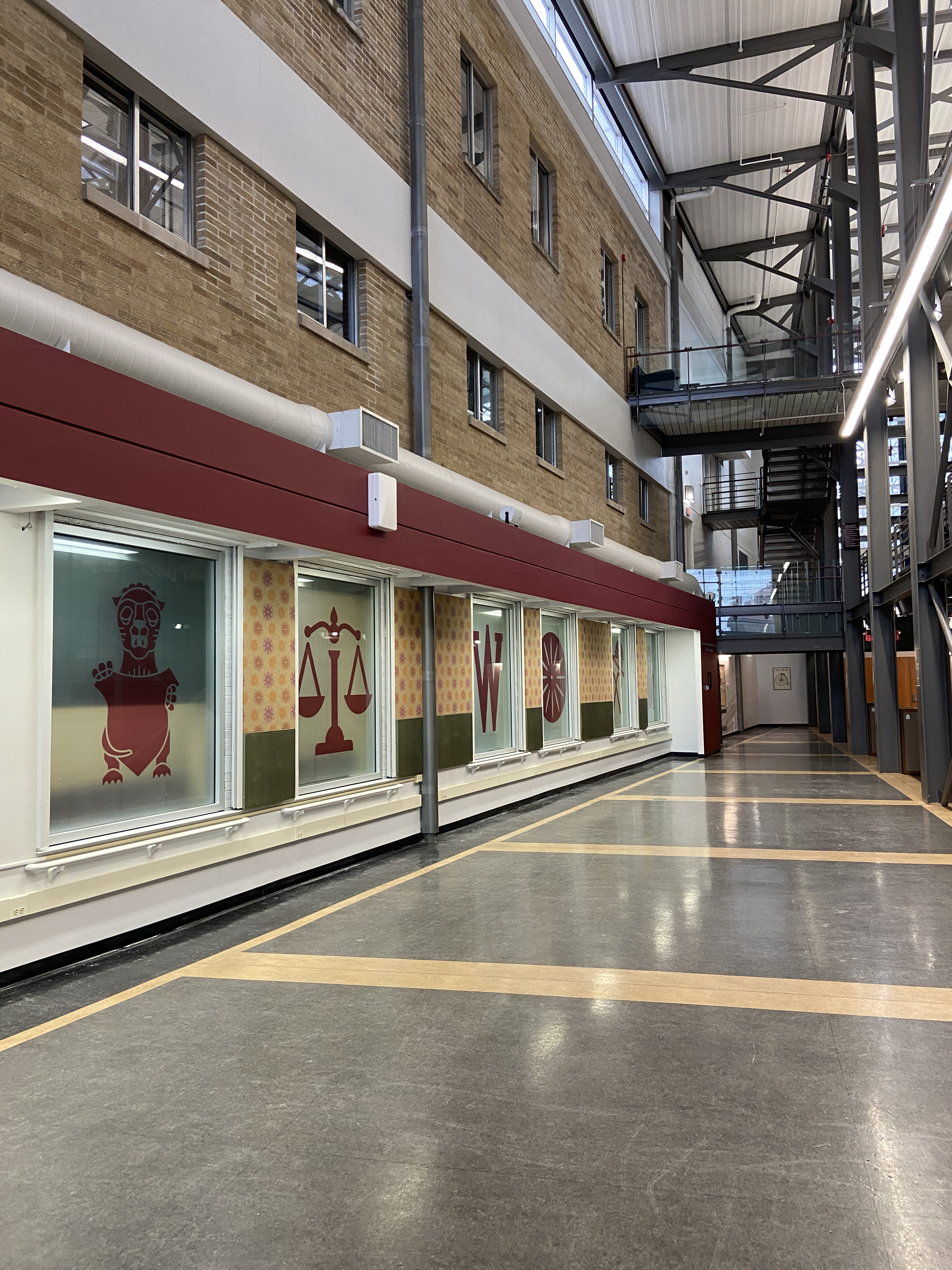
Atrium of the University of Wisconsin Law School

The law school is located on Bascom Hill, the center of the UW–Madison campus. In 1996, it completed a major renovation project that joined two previous buildings and created a four-story glass atrium. The renovation was recognized by the American Institute of Architects for its innovative design, incorporating modern design into the 150 years of architecture on historic Bascom Hill. In addition to lecture halls and smaller classrooms, the law school contains a fully functional trial courtroom, appellate courtroom, and an extensive law library. With over 1,360,000 volumes, the library is the largest legal collection in the state of Wisconsin and the fourth largest amongst law schools nationwide. The library is also noted for the 1942 mural, "The Freeing of the Slaves" by John Steuart Curry, that dominates the Quarles & Brady Reading Room (also known as the "Old Reading Room").

== Admissions ==
For the class entering in 2025, the school accepted 19.12% of applicants, with 46.41% of those accepted enrolling. The average enrollee had a 167 LSAT score and 3.81 undergraduate GPA.

== Academics ==
The University of Wisconsin Law School subscribes to a "law in action" legal philosophy. This philosophy proposes that to truly understand the law, students must not only know the "law on the books", but also study how the law is actually practiced by professionals. The law school's classroom discussions, involvement with other campus departments, scholarship, and clinical practica all emphasize the interplay between law and society.

=== Diploma privilege ===
The University of Wisconsin Law School is one of only two law schools in the United States graduates of which enjoy diploma privilege as a method of admission to the bar. Unlike all other jurisdictions in the United States, Wisconsin's state bar allows graduates of accredited law schools within the state to join the bar without taking the state's bar examination if they complete certain requirements in their law school courses and achieve a certain level of performance in those courses. The other school with this privilege is the Marquette University Law School.

=== Clinical programs ===
The Frank J. Remington Center focuses on criminal law clinics, named after former UW law professor Frank J. Remington. Its largest program, the Legal Assistance to Institutionalized Persons Project, provides legal services to inmates incarcerated in Wisconsin. Other programs focus on family law, criminal defense, criminal prosecution, criminal appeals, community-oriented policing, restorative justice, and wrongful-conviction cases through an innocence project.

The Economic Justice Institute focuses on civil law clinics, with programs in consumer law, domestic abuse restraining orders, family law, immigration law, landlord-tenant law, and workers' rights. The law school also includes the Law and Entrepreneurship Clinic, which focuses on transactional law and assists startups and other business entities, as well as the Center for Patient Partnerships, an interdisciplinary program with students in the School of Medicine and Public Health (University of Wisconsin–Madison).

== Journals and publications ==
The University of Wisconsin Law School publishes four law journals:

- Wisconsin Law Review, the law school's flagship journal, was founded in 1920 and became entirely student-run in 1935
- Journal of American Constitutional History, established in 2023
- Wisconsin International Law Journal, established in 1982
- Wisconsin Journal of Law, Gender & Society (formerly Wisconsin Women's Law Journal), established in 1985

A third student-led specialty journal, the Wisconsin Environmental Law Journal, was founded in 1994 but discontinued publication in 2002. Apart from the Journal of American Constitutional History, which is peer-reviewed by scholars, journal membership is obtained through participation in writing competitions.

== Traditions ==
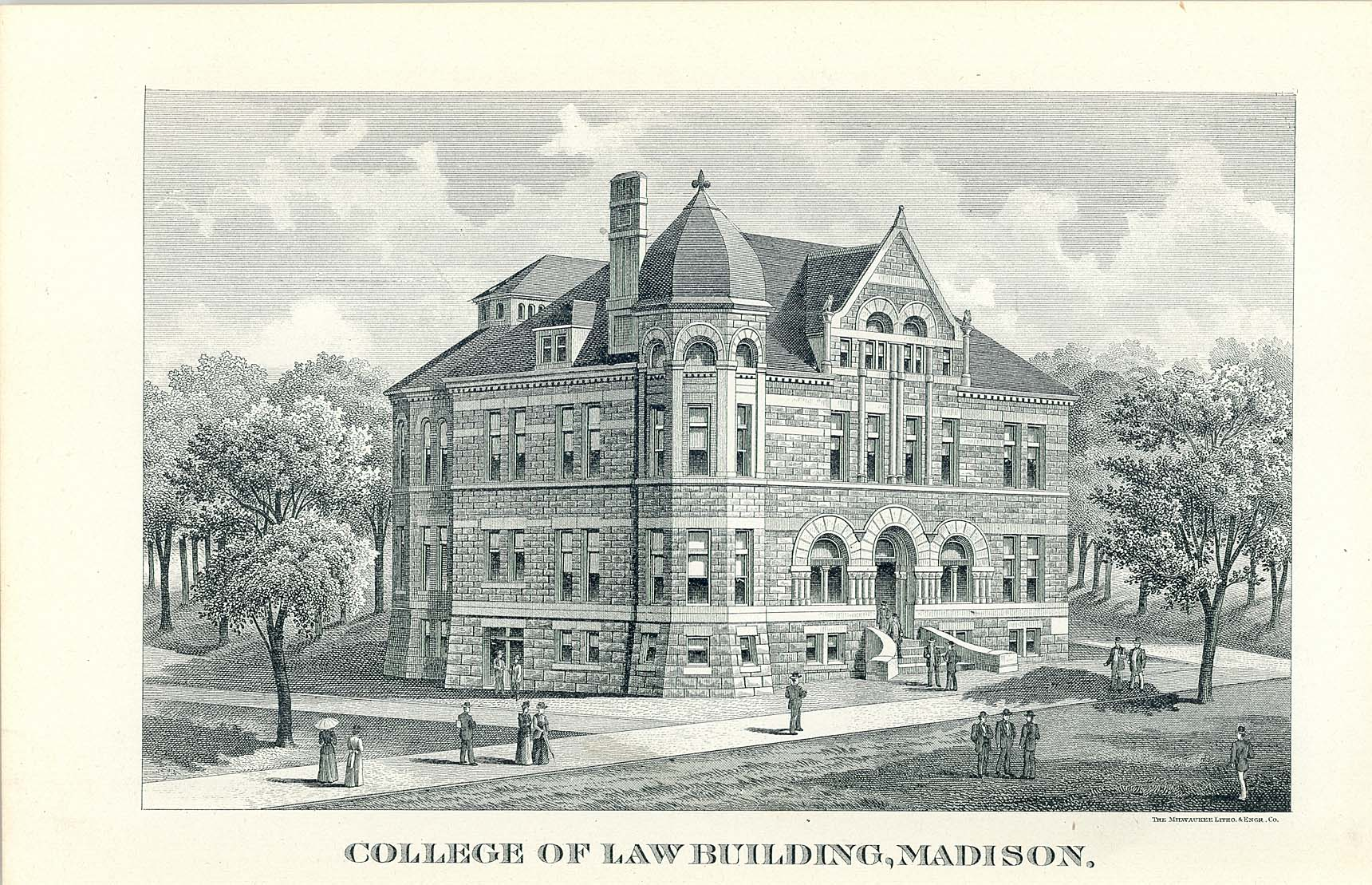
Engraving of the 1893 law building

The most visible tradition at the law school is that of the Gargoyle. The Gargoyle graced the roof of the original law school building, built in 1893. When that building was torn down in 1963, the gargoyle was found intact amongst the rubble and was saved as an unofficial mascot. It became the symbol of the law school and was displayed outside the law school building for many years. With the most recent renovation, it moved to a more protected location inside the law school atrium. The image of the gargoyle graces the cover of the Wisconsin Law Review and the law school alumni magazine is called the Gargoyle. Its image has been applied to law school memorabilia. In addition to the Gargoyle, "Blind Bucky" is also sometimes used as an unofficial mascot of the law school.

Another tradition is the homecoming cane toss, which dates from the 1930s. Before the university's homecoming football game, third-year law students run from the north end of the football field at Camp Randall Stadium to the south end wearing bowler hats and carrying canes. When the students reach the goalpost on the south end of the field, they attempt to throw their canes over the goalpost. Legend has it that if the student successfully throws the cane over the goalpost and catches it, she will win her first case; if she fails to catch it, the opposite will hold true.

Another tradition is an annual fall competition between the law and medical schools at the university. This competition, called the Dean's Cup, raises funds for local charities.

== Rankings and reputation ==
According to the 2026 rankings published by U.S. News & World Report, the University of Wisconsin Law School is ranked 26th (tied) amongst 197 law schools fully accredited by the American Bar Association.

== Employment ==
According to ABA-required disclosures, 86% of the Class of 2023 had obtained full-time, long-term, bar passage-required employment within nine months of graduating.

== Notable faculty ==
- Sumudu Atapattu
- Bernadette Atuahene
- Alta Charo
- Marc Galanter
- Elizabeth Mertz
- Margaret Raymond
- Joel Rogers
- David Schwartz

=== Former faculty ===
- Ann Althouse
- Louis Butler
- Richard Dickson Cudahy
- Charles P. Dykman
- Nathan Feinsinger
- Paul B. Higginbotham
- James Willard Hurst
- Jane Larson
- Joan F. Kessler
- Frank J. Remington
- Charles B. Schudson
- Ithamar Sloan
- Frank M. Tuerkheimer
- Patricia J. Williams
