= 1996 Wisconsin Supreme Court election =

- March 19, 1996
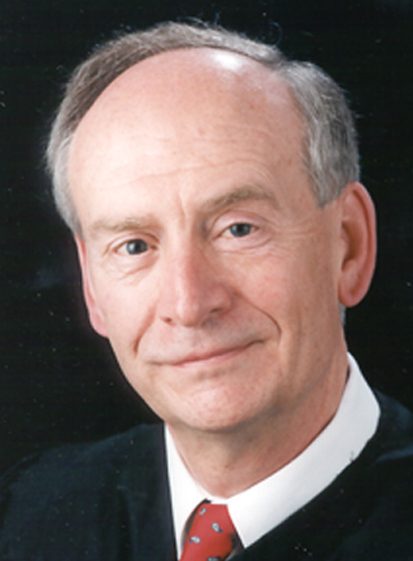

Candidate	N. Patrick Crooks	Ralph Adam Fine
Popular vote	520,594	360,686
Percentage	59.07%	40.93%
- Crooks: 50–60% 60–70% 70–80% 80–90% Fine: 50–60%
Justice before election
Roland B. Day
Elected Justice
N. Patrick Crooks

The 1996 Wisconsin Supreme Court election was held on March 19, 1996, to elect a justice to the Wisconsin Supreme Court for a ten-year term. The incumbent justice, Chief Justice Roland B. Day, retired after 22 years on the court. Wisconsin circuit court judge N. Patrick Crooks won the election, defeating Wisconsin Court of Appeals judge Ralph Adam Fine in the general election.

== Background ==
While Wisconsin typically holds its spring elections in early April, the 1996 spring general election was held on March 19. This is because in March 1995, Governor Tommy Thompson signed into law a bill moving both the 1996 spring general election and the state's presidential primaries from April 2 to March 19 in order to align its primary with the Illinois, Michigan, and Ohio primaries held on that day. This was done in hopes that Wisconsin can join these fellow Midwestern states in a so-called "Big Ten primary" held shortly-following the southern Super Tuesday in the major party primary calendars.

The 1995 and 1996 elections were the fourth instance in the court's history in which two consecutive elections were for open seats (without an incumbent running). (Note: The five previous instances in Wisconsin state history in which consecutive supreme court elections have been for open seats were: 1961 and 1963; 1977 and 1978; 1980 and 1983; As of 2025, two subsequent instances of this have since occurred: 2018 and 2019; 2023 and 2025)

== Candidates ==
=== Advanced ===
- N. Patrick Crooks: Wisconsin Circuit Court judge for the Brown County circuit (branch 6) since 1977, unsuccessful candidate for supreme court in 1995
- Ralph Adam Fine: Wisconsin Court of Appeals judge since 1988, former Wisconsin Circuit Court judge for the Milwaukee County circuit (1979–88), unsuccessful candidate for Supreme Court in 1989

=== Eliminated in primary ===
- Lawrence "Larry" J. Bugge, Madison-based attorney (resident partner at Foley & Lardner), Wisconsin representative to the Uniform Law Commission (since 1973), former president of the Uniform Law Commission (1989–1991), former president of the State Bar of Wisconsin
- Harold Vernon Froehlich, Outagamie County Wisconsin Circuit Court judge since 1981
- Stanley A. Miller, Milwaukee County Circuit Court judge since 1992
- Charles B. Schudson, 1st district Wisconsin Court of Appeals judge since 1992
- Ted E. Wedemeyer Jr., district 1 judge of the Wisconsin Court of Appeals (1982–88; since 1992), unsuccessful candidate for Supreme Court in 1995

Primary county results Crooks: 20–30%; 30–40%; 40–50%; 50–60%; 60–70%; 70–80%; 80–90%; Fine: 20–30%; 30–40%; Wedemeyer: 20–30%; Bugge: 20–30%; 30–40%; Froehlich: 20–30%; 30–40%; 40–50%; 50–60%

=== Ideology of candidates ===
Crooks was considered a conservative and campaigned as such. As a justice, he would later develop into a swing vote on the court who was variably categorized either as reliable conservative, a liberal, a centrist with liberal leanings, or a centrist with conservative leanings. In general, as a justice he joined the court's majority on most opinions.

Fine was also a conservative. Bugge was characterized as being a liberal.

== Primary election campaign ==
Candidates declined to take stances on a number of hot-button issues (including capital punishment and abortion rights), arguing that they could one day be the subject of cases before them and that discussing the matters as candidates would create a judicial ethics concern.

Voter and candidate geography was seen as a likely factor in the campaign. Bugge was seen as potentially assisted by the fact that he was the only contender from the populous Madison-area, as hometown voter support could grant him an edge. Meanwhile, southeastern Wisconsin was seen as likely to have fragmented sentiments in the race, due to four candidates being from the Milwaukee area (Fine from Bayside, Miller from Milwaukee, Schudson from Shorewood, and Wedemeyer from Milwaukee). The Fox Valley was seen as likely to have some split sentiments between both Crooks and Froelich, due to both of them being from the area (Crooks from Green Bay and Froelich from Appleton).

=== Bugge's campaign ===
Bugge was the only contender in the election who was not a sitting judge on a state lower court. He touted this as an attribute; noting that all incumbent justices of the court had served on the state's lower courts, he argued that his differing background would add a diversity of experience to the court. He also touted the depth of his expertise on commercial law, consumer law, and business law.

=== Crooks's campaign ===
1996 marked Crooks's second campaign for the Wisconsin Supreme Court, having unsuccessfully run the previous year.

Crooks spoke against judicial activism, remarking, "I feel very strongly that the rule of a judge is to interpret the law, not to make law from the bench. You've got to make a decision based on law."

Policies Crooks spoke of in his campaign included support for truth in sentencing policy, and criticized the state's substitution policies as being too lenient, alleging that criminal defendants were effectively able to find the most lenient judge. He advocated for the creation of a business court. He also argued that the state needed a greater focus on policies regarding juvenile crime, including the adoption of proposed reforms he had been involved in writing for the state's Juvenile Justice Code.

=== Fine's campaign ===
The main argument of Fine's primary election campaign was his characterization of the current Supreme Court as lazy, criticizing the court as taking too light a caseload in recent years.

Fine spoke against the Supreme Court's recent overturning of a decision he written as an appellate judge regarding the state Department of Correction's policy regarding the early release date of prisoners. Crooks's decision had held that the State Department of Corrections had been incorrect in their interpretation of statutes when adopting a policy that counted time off for good behavior for as much as years worth of time for early release of prisoners.

Fine promised to refuse campaign contributions from special interests.

=== Froehlich's campaign ===
Gunderson argued that the court needed to a take a greater caseload. He promised not to take campaign contributions from special interests.

=== Miller's campaign ===
Miller argued that the courts needed to have a greater focus on its role in addressing societal issues, such as racism and poverty.

=== Schudson's campaign ===
Schudson argued that the courts should do more to assist the victims of domestic abuse.

=== Wedemeyer's campaign ===
Wedemeyer proposed the creation of a blue-ribbon committee to assess the state's court system and the public's expectations for it.

== General election campaign ==
As in the primary, key issues of Crooks's campaign was support for the idea of creating a business court in the state, advocacy for the state's legal system needed to focus more on juvenile crime, and support for truth in sentencing laws. Fine criticized the court for issue too many unanimous and near-unanimous decisions, arguing that this indicated a lack of intellectual debate on the court about cases that were being heard. Fine also criticized the court as being lazy, arguing that the 75 cases it had issued in its previous term was too few. He was also a critic of plea bargains, and he supported the allowing of judge substitution on demand (without cause).

The editorial board of the La Crosse Tribune characterized the Supreme Court race as more eventful than was typical of such elections due to Fine's vociferous style of campaigning, writing, "Wisconsin Supreme Court races are generally quieter than this years race...given fine's aggressive personality, that's not surprising." The editorial board further noted that Fine's loud onslaught of criticisms of Crooks was likely motivated by Crooks having secured a broad array of endorsements for his campaign, placing him an advantageous position over Fine. The editorial noted that when Ann Walsh Bradley had a similar advantage over Crooks in the previous year's general election, Crooks himself had reacted by adopting more politicized and right-pandering rhetoric.

After Crooks and Fine both advanced past the seven-candidate primary, Crooks hired Scott Jensen (the Republican majority leader of the State Assembly) to be his campaign manager. Fine filed a complaint with the state Ethics Board over this, accusing Jensen of utilizing his public office to secure financial gain. Fine focused his general election campaign criticisms on Crooks' acceptance of campaign contributions from special interests, and pledged that (in contrast) he would not be accepting campaign contributions or endorsements from special interests. He also questioned whether Crooks could be a neutral justice on matters involved the state legislature (due to Jensen's role in his campaign) or special interests (due to campaign contributions). Crooks argued that he and his campaign was not beholden to others because he enjoyed a broad base of support from many different groups and individuals, including groups that often came into political conflict with each other. Claiming he had a big tent of support, Crooks remarked, "we are receiving support from all sides". Crooks defended fiscal contributions from interest groups as a necessity to run an effective statewide campaign. He also claimed that the money raised for his campaign was raised independent of himself by his committee, and that he had asked that his committee keep him uninformed about what groups were contributing and also accept balanced amounts of contributions from groups on all sides of the issues being advocated on.

Fine, who refused to accept endorsements or financial contributions from special interest groups, not only criticized Crooks for accepting such support, but also argued to voters that a victory by himself over Crooks would send a message to interest groups that they are unwelcome in Wisconsin judicial races. Fine argued, "I've never known any lobbyist who gave any money without expecting anything in return," and exclaimed to voters, "I believe PACS and lobbyists gave no role in judicial races. I plead with you, send them all a message that our courts are not for sale." Fine, who had grown up in the state of New York, argued that that state's judiciary had been tarnished by the influence of politics and special interests, and argued Crooks's choices for campaign manager, donors, and endorsers threatened to similarly contaminate the Wisconsin judiciary.

The editorial board of The Capital Times opined that ethics concerns that Fine raised against Crooks regarding special interest indeed had merit, but nevertheless reluctantly endorsed Crooks, opining,

The problem is that Fine is a demagogue on crime issues, and has advocated extreme positions on plea bargaining and other practices that could end up overwhelming the criminal justice system, costing taxpayers millions. In addition, Fine's combative style would destroy any sense of collegiality on the court.

By the final campaign finance report before the election, Crooks's campaign had raised more than $106,000; nearly double what Fine's campaign had raised.

On March 8, a televised debate was held between the two contenders.

== Endorsements ==
=== Endorsements in primary ===
Larry Bugge

State judges

- Nathan Heffernan, former Wisconsin Supreme Court justice

Newspaper editorial boards

- The Capital Times (co-endorsement shared with Wedenmeyer)
- Milwaukee Journal Sentinel
Harold Vernon Froehlich

Newspaper editorial boards

- The Post-Crescent
Ted Wedenmeyer Jr.

Newspaper editorial boards

- The Capital Times (co-endorsement shared with Bugge)

=== Endorsements in general election ===
Patrick Crooks

Members of the U.S. House of Representatives

- Scott Klug, congressman from Wisconsin's 2nd district (Republican)

State judges

- Nathan Heffernan, former Wisconsin Supreme Court justice

Statewide officials

- Tommy Thompson, governor (Republican)

Local officials

- Mike Blaska, chairman of the Dane County Board of Supervisors
- Bill Foust, district attorney of Dane County
- Richard J. Phelps, Dane County executive (Democrat)
- Paul Soglin, mayor of Madison (Democrat)

Individuals

- Larry Bugge, 4th-place finisher in the primary

Trade unions

- AFL-CIO

Newspaper editorials

- The Capital Times
- Green Bay Press-Gazette
- La Crosse Tribune
- Wisconsin State Journal

== Results ==
1996 Wisconsin Supreme Court election
Party	Candidate	Votes	%	±%
Primary election ( February 6, 1996)
Nonpartisan	N. Patrick Crooks	84,223	27.03	
Nonpartisan	Ralph Adam Fine	50,801	16.31	
Nonpartisan	Ted E. Wedemeyer Jr.	44,988	14.44	
Nonpartisan	Lawrence J. Bugge	44,020	14.13	
Nonpartisan	Harold Vernon Froehlich	34,632	11.12	
Nonpartisan	Stanley A. Miller	28,047	9.00	
Nonpartisan	Charles B. Schudson	24,853	7.98	
Total votes		311,564	100	
General election (March 19, 1996)
Nonpartisan	N. Patrick Crooks	520,594	59.07	
Nonpartisan	Ralph Adam Fine	360,686	40.93	
Total votes		881,280	100	-6.12
