= 2015 Wisconsin elections =

- April 7, 2015

The 2015 Wisconsin Spring Election was held in the U.S. state of Wisconsin on April 7, 2015. There was a contested election for justice of the Wisconsin Supreme Court, as well as several other nonpartisan local and judicial elections and an amendment to the Constitution of Wisconsin to change the process for selection of the chief justice of the State Supreme Court. In addition, the ballot contained a special election to fill a vacancy in the 20th State Senate district. The 2015 Wisconsin Spring Primary was held February 17, 2015.

In the Wisconsin Supreme Court election, the Democrats' preferred candidate, incumbent Ann Walsh Bradley, was reelected. The Constitutional Amendment, however, favored by Republicans, was approved by voters and led to the removal of Chief Justice Shirley Abrahamson.

Later in the year, there were two more special elections, for the 33rd State Senate district and the 99th State Assembly district.

== State elections ==
=== Legislative ===
==== State Senate 20th district special election ====
A special election was held concurrent with the regularly scheduled Spring election to fill the 20th district seat of the Wisconsin State Senate. The seat was vacated by Republican Glenn Grothman, who had been elected to the United States House of Representatives in the 2014 general election. At the time of the election, the 20th Senate district contained most of Washington County and the northern half of Ozaukee County, including the city of Cedarburg, as well as parts of western Sheboygan County, eastern Fond du Lac County, and southern Calumet County. It was considered a safe Republican seat.

No Democrat registered to run for this seat in the special election. In the Spring primary, Republican Duey Stroebel defeated Tiffany Koehler and Lee E. Schlenvogt with 67% of the vote. He went on to win the special election without a formal opponent on the ballot.

==== State Senate 33rd district special election ====
A special election was held July 21, 2015, to fill the 33rd district seat of the Wisconsin State Senate. The seat was vacated by Republican Paul Farrow, who resigned after he had been elected county executive of Waukesha County in the Spring general election. At the time of the election, the 33rd Senate district comprised most of central Waukesha County, including the cities of Waukesha and Delafield. It was considered a safe Republican seat.

In the June 23, 2015, primary, Republican State Representative Chris Kapenga defeated Brian Dorow and M. D. Langner with 52% of the vote, and Democrat Sherryll Shaddock was unopposed. Kapenga went on to win the special election with 72% of the vote with only 12% of the turnout of the previous general election.

Wisconsin Senate, 33rd District Special Election, 2015
Party	Candidate	Votes	%	±%
Special Election, July 21, 2015
Republican	Chris Kapenga	7,191	71.86%	−2.00%
Democratic	Sherryll Shaddock	2,798	27.96%	+1.89%
	Scattering	18	0.18%	
Plurality		4,393	43.90%	-3.89%
Total votes		10,007	100.0%	-87.51%
Republican hold				

==== State Assembly 99th district special election ====
A special election was held September 29, 2015, to fill the 99th district seat of the Wisconsin State Assembly. The seat was vacated by Republican Chris Kapenga, who resigned after winning the special election for the 33rd State Senate district held in July 2015. At the time of the election, the 99th Assembly district comprised part of western Waukesha County, including the city of Delafield and the villages of Dousman, Hartland, Merton, Nashotah, North Prairie, and Wales. It was considered a safe Republican seat.

No Democrat registered to run for this seat in the special election. In the September 1, 2015, primary, Republican Cindi Duchow defeated Dave Westlake, Scott Owens, and perennial candidate Spencer Zimmerman, taking 40% of the vote. She won the special election without opposition.

=== Judicial ===
==== State Supreme Court ====
2015 Wisconsin Supreme Court election
- April 7, 2015
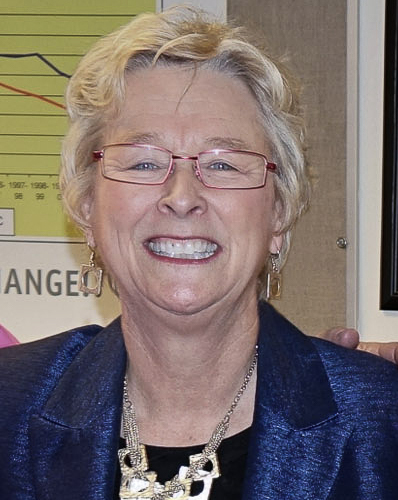

Candidate	Ann Walsh Bradley	James P. Daley
Popular vote	471,866	340,632
Percentage	58.02%	41.89%
- County results Bradley: 50–60% 60–70% 70–80% Daley: 50–60% 60–70%
Justice before election
Ann Walsh Bradley
Elected Justice
Ann Walsh Bradley

A regularly scheduled Wisconsin Supreme Court election was held on the Spring election ballot. Incumbent Ann Walsh Bradley was seeking a third ten-year term on the court. She faced a challenge from Judge James P. Daley, then the Chief Judge of the 5th Judicial Administrative District of Wisconsin circuit courts. Judge Bradley successfully defended her seat and was reelected with nearly 60% of the vote in April.

===== Candidates =====
- Ann Walsh Bradley, incumbent Justice of the Wisconsin Supreme Court
- James P. Daley, Chief Judge of the 5th Judicial District, Judge of the Rock County Circuit Court (Branch 1)

===== Results =====
2015 Wisconsin Supreme Court election
Party	Candidate	Votes	%
Nonpartisan	Ann Walsh Bradley (incumbent)	471,866	58.02%
Nonpartisan	James P. Daley	340,632	41.89%
Write-in		702	0.09%
Total votes		813,200	100.0%

==== State Court of Appeals ====
Two seats on the Wisconsin Court of Appeals were up for election in 2015. Only one was contested.

- In District I, Judge Kitty Brennan, appointed by Governor Jim Doyle in 2008, was unopposed seeking her second full term.
- In District III, Wausau attorney Mark Seidl defeated Eau Claire circuit judge Kristina Bourget, to succeed the retiring judge Michael W. Hoover.

Wisconsin Court of Appeals, District III Election, 2015
Party	Candidate	Votes	%
General Election, April 7, 2015
Nonpartisan	Mark Seidl	108,147	57.06%
Nonpartisan	Kristina M. Bourget	81,065	42.77%
	Scattering	324	0.17%
Plurality		27,082	14.29%
Total votes		189,536	100.0%

=== Constitutional Amendment ===
Election of Chief Justice
- April 7, 2015
- Election of Chief Justice. Shall section 4(2) of Article VII of the constitution be amended to direct that a chief justice of the supreme court shall be elected for a two year term by a majority of the justices then serving on the court?

Results
Choice	Votes	%
Yes	433,533	53.00%
No	384,503	47.00%
Total votes	818,036	100.00%
- Yes: 50–60% 60–70% 70–80% No: 50–60% 60–70%

In the April election, Wisconsin voters approved an amendment to the Constitution of Wisconsin to allow the members of the Wisconsin Supreme Court to elect the chief justice. Previously, the Wisconsin Constitution specified that the most senior member of the court would be the chief justice. The effect of the amendment was that it allowed the court's conservative majority to remove Chief Justice Shirley Abrahamson and replace her with Justice Patience D. Roggensack.

== Local offices ==
=== Brown County ===
==== Green Bay Mayor ====
- Incumbent Jim Schmitt was reelected to his fourth four-year term as Mayor of Green Bay.

=== Dane County ===
==== Madison Mayor ====
- Incumbent Paul Soglin was reelected to his third four-year term as Mayor of Madison. Soglin had also previously served five two-year terms as Mayor.

=== Outagamie County ===
==== Outagamie County executive ====
- Incumbent Outagamie County Executive Tom Nelson was reelected to a second four-year term without opposition.

=== Racine County ===
==== Racine Mayor ====
- Incumbent John Dickert was reelected to his second four-year term as Mayor of Racine. He was first elected in a 2009 special election to fill a vacancy.
