= Harold V. Froehlich =

Retired American politician and judge (born 1932)

Harold Froehlich
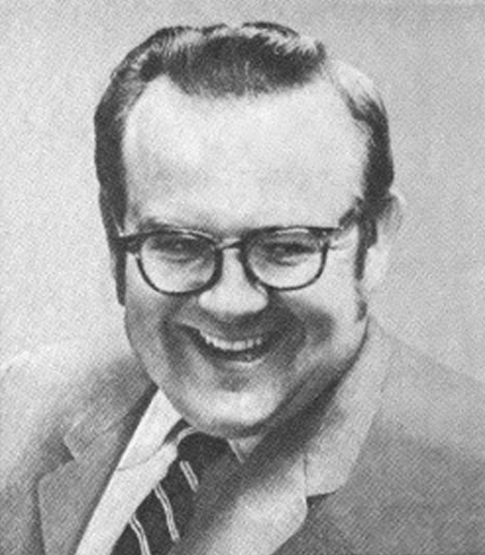

Chief Judge of the 8th district of Wisconsin Circuit Courts
- In office August 1, 1988 – July 31, 1994
- Preceded by: William J. Duffy
- Succeeded by: Philip Kirk

Wisconsin Circuit Judge for the Outagamie Circuit, Branch 4
- In office August 14, 1981 – April 8, 2011
- Appointed by: Lee S. Dreyfus
- Preceded by: Thomas Cane
- Succeeded by: Gregory Gill

Member of the U.S. House of Representatives from Wisconsin's 8th district
- In office January 3, 1973 – January 3, 1975
- Preceded by: John W. Byrnes
- Succeeded by: Robert John Cornell

Minority Leader of the Wisconsin State Assembly
- In office January 4, 1971 – January 3, 1973
- Preceded by: Robert T. Huber
- Succeeded by: John C. Shabaz

66th Speaker of the Wisconsin State Assembly
- In office January 11, 1967 – January 4, 1971
- Preceded by: Robert T. Huber
- Succeeded by: Robert T. Huber

Member of the Wisconsin State Assembly from the Outagamie 1st district
- In office January 1, 1963 – January 1, 1973
- Preceded by: Kenneth E. Priebe
- Succeeded by: Constituency abolished

Personal details
- Born: Harold Vernon Froehlich; May 12, 1932 (age 94) Appleton, Wisconsin, U.S.
- Party: Republican
- Spouse: Sharon Ross (m. 1970)
- Children: 2
- Education: University of Wisconsin, Madison (BBA, LLB)

Military service
- Allegiance: United States
- Branch/service: United States Navy
- Years of service: 1951–1955
- Battles/wars: Korean War

Harold Vernon Froehlich (born May 12, 1932) is a retired American politician and judge. He served one term in the U.S. House of Representatives, representing Wisconsin's 8th congressional district during the 93rd Congress (1973–1975). A Republican, he broke with his party to vote for the impeachment of President Richard M. Nixon.

After leaving Congress, he served thirty years—from 1981 to 2011—as a Wisconsin circuit court judge in Outagamie County. Earlier in his career, he served ten years in the Wisconsin State Assembly and was the 66th speaker of the Wisconsin State Assembly. His final public office was on the Wisconsin Government Accountability Board, where he served until its dissolution in 2015.

== Biography ==
Born in Appleton, Wisconsin, Froehlich served in the United States Navy during the Korean War after graduating from Appleton Senior High School in 1950. In 1959, Froehlich graduated from the University of Wisconsin–Madison and then received his law degree in 1962. That same year, he was elected to his first term in the Wisconsin State Assembly. He would ultimately serve ten years in the Assembly, and was chosen as Speaker during the 1967–1968 and 1969–1970 sessions. He has been married to Sharon Ross since 1970, and they have two children.

Besides being involved with politics he is also a certified public accountant and real estate broker. He is a former treasurer for the Black Creek Improvement Corp and former president of 322 Investment, Ltd.

Wisconsin's 8th congressional district 1972–1981

He was narrowly elected to the 93rd United States Congress in 1972 to succeed the retiring incumbent John W. Byrnes in Wisconsin's 8th congressional district. He lost his reelection bid to Democrat Robert John Cornell in the wave election of 1974, following the resignation of President Richard Nixon. Froehlich had voted for the impeachment of President Nixon as a member of the House Judiciary Committee. During his term in Congress, he hired future Wisconsin Supreme Court Justice David Prosser, Jr., as a legislative aide.

Governor Lee S. Dreyfus appointed Froehlich to the Wisconsin Circuit Court in Outagamie County in 1981. He was elected to a full term on the court in 1982 and was subsequently re-elected in 1988, 1994, 2000, and 2006. The Wisconsin Supreme Court selected Judge Froehlich as Chief Judge for the 8th Judicial Administrative for the maximum 3 two-year terms from 1988 to 1994. He retired from the court on April 8, 2011.

In 2013, Governor Scott Walker appointed Judge Froehlich to the Wisconsin Government Accountability Board. Judge Froehlich served as vice chair of the board in 2014. The Government Accountability Board was abolished by legislation signed by Governor Walker in 2015.

During his career, Judge Froehlich served as president of the Wisconsin Trial Judges Association and was a delegate to the National Conference of State Trial Judges. Judge Froehlich was named "Judge of the Year" in 1999 by the Bench Bar committee of the State Bar of Wisconsin. In 2013, the state bar honored him with a Lifetime Jurist Achievement Award, where he was praised by his former legislative aide, Justice David Prosser, Jr. The American Judges Association created the "Harold Froehlich Award for Judicial Courage" in 2013, to "recognize the highest level of judicial courage in the service of justice."

== Toilet paper panic ==
Froehlich represented a district in which the paper industry is a major employer. Prompted by concern from the industry, on December 11, 1973, Froehlich issued a press release declaring, "The U.S. may face a shortage of toilet paper within a few months," and alluded to rationing as a possible solution. The release made it into major newspapers and to Johnny Carson. On December 19, Carson told his audience of tens of millions in his Tonight Show monologue that there was a shortage of toilet paper. Primed by recent shortages of other kinds of paper along with gasoline and meat, consumers went out the next day and hoarded toilet paper, emptying store shelves. The run on toilet paper continued for three weeks, until consumers saw that stores were being restocked and that there was therefore no shortage. The incident was the subject of a short film released in early 2020 by documentary filmmaker Brian Gersten, The Great Toilet Paper Scare. Ironically, a genuine scarcity of toilet paper occurred later that year due to the COVID-19 pandemic.

== Electoral history ==
=== Wisconsin Assembly (1962–1970) ===
| Year | Type | Date | Elected | | | | Defeated | | | | Total | Plurality |
|---|---|---|---|---|---|---|---|---|---|---|---|---|
| 1962 | General | November 6 | Harold V. Froehlich | Republican | 12,453 | 76.15% | Robert W. Swanson | Dem. | 3,901 | 23.85% | 16,354 | 8,552 |
| 1964 | General | November 3 | Harold V. Froehlich (inc.) | Republican | 9,405 | 71.27% | Maurice J. Stack | Dem. | 3,791 | 28.73% | 13,196 | 5,614 |
| 1966 | Primary | September 13 | Harold V. Froehlich (inc.) | Republican | 3,314 | 78.40% | Charles E. Wussow | Rep. | 913 | 21.60% | 4,227 | 2,401 |
| 1966 | General | November 8 | Harold V. Froehlich (inc.) | Republican | 8,386 | 78.82% | Ronald H. Steward | Dem. | 2,254 | 21.18% | 10,640 | 6,132 |
| 1968 | General | November 5 | Harold V. Froehlich (inc.) | Republican | 10,038 | 74.96% | Juanita M. Sanders | Dem. | 3,353 | 25.04% | 13,391 | 6,685 |
| 1970 | General | November 5 | Harold V. Froehlich (inc.) | Republican | 6,101 | 57.43% | Glenn W. Thompson | Dem. | 4,522 | 42.57% | 10,623 | 1,579 |

=== U.S. House of Representatives (1972, 1974) ===
Wisconsin's 8th Congressional District Election, 1972
| Party | Candidate | Votes | % | ±% |
|---|---|---|---|---|
Republican Primary, September 12, 1972
| Republican | Harold V. Froehlich | 20,355 | 38.82% | |
| Republican | James R. Long | 15,095 | 28.79% | |
| Republican | Myron P. Lotto | 14,862 | 28.35% | |
| Republican | Frederick O. Kile | 2,118 | 4.04% | |
| Plurality | | 5,260 | 10.03% | |
| Total votes | | 52,430 | 100.0% | |
General Election, November 7, 1972
| Republican | Harold V. Froehlich | 101,634 | 50.41% | −5.10% |
| Democratic | Robert John Cornell | 97,795 | 48.50% | +4.94% |
| American | Clyde Bunker | 2,192 | 1.09% | +0.16% |
| Plurality | | 3,839 | 1.91% | -10.05% |
| Total votes | | 201,621 | 100.0% | +45.55% |
| Republican hold | | | | |

Wisconsin's 8th Congressional District Election, 1974
| Party | Candidate | Votes | % | ±% |
|---|---|---|---|---|
General Election, November 5, 1974
| Democratic | Robert John Cornell | 79,923 | 54.44% | +5.93% |
| Republican | Harold V. Froehlich (incumbent) | 66,889 | 45.56% | −4.85% |
| Plurality | | 13,034 | 8.88% | +7.21% |
| Total votes | | 146,812 | 100.0% | -27.18% |
| Democratic gain from Republican | | | | |

=== Wisconsin Circuit Court (1982–2006) ===
Wisconsin Circuit Court, Outagamie Circuit, Branch 4 Election, 1982
| Party | Candidate | Votes | % | ±% |
|---|---|---|---|---|
General Election, April 6, 1982
| Nonpartisan | Harold V. Froehlich (incumbent) | 13,915 | 57.65% | |
| Nonpartisan | Patrick Mares | 10,222 | 42.35% | |
| Plurality | | 3,693 | 15.30% | |
| Total votes | | 24,137 | 100.0% | |

Wisconsin Circuit Court, Outagamie Circuit, Branch 4 Election, 1988
| Party | Candidate | Votes | % | ±% |
|---|---|---|---|---|
General Election, April 5, 1988
| Nonpartisan | Harold V. Froehlich (incumbent) | 29,298 | 100.0% | |
| Total votes | | 29,298 | 100.0% | +21.38% |

=== Wisconsin Supreme Court election (1996) ===
1996 Wisconsin Supreme Court election
| Party | Candidate | Votes | % | ±% |
|---|---|---|---|---|
General Election, February 6, 1996
| Nonpartisan | N. Patrick Crooks | 84,223 | 27.03 | |
| Nonpartisan | Ralph Adam Fine | 50,801 | 16.31 | |
| Nonpartisan | Ted E. Wedemeyer Jr. | 44,988 | 14.44 | |
| Nonpartisan | Lawrence J. Bugge | 44,020 | 14.13 | |
| Nonpartisan | Harold Vernon Froehlich | 34,632 | 11.12 | |
| Nonpartisan | Stanley A. Miller | 28,047 | 9.00 | |
| Nonpartisan | Charles B. Schudson | 24,853 | 7.98 | |
| Total votes | | 311,564 | 100 | |
General Election, March 19, 1996
| Nonpartisan | N. Patrick Crooks | 520,594 | 59.07 | |
| Nonpartisan | Ralph Adam Fine | 360,686 | 40.93 | |
| Total votes | | 881,280 | 100 | -6.12 |

Wisconsin State Assembly
| Preceded by Robert T. Huber | Speaker of the Wisconsin State Assembly; 1967–1971 | Succeeded by Robert T. Huber |
| Preceded by Robert T. Huber | Minority Leader of the Wisconsin State Assembly; 1971–1973 | Succeeded by John C. Shabaz |
U.S. House of Representatives
| Preceded by John W. Byrnes | Member of the U.S. House of Representatives from Wisconsin's 8th congressional district 1973–1975 | Succeeded by Robert John Cornell |
U.S. order of precedence (ceremonial)
| Preceded by Abby Finkenauer as Former U.S. Representative | Order of precedence of the United States as Former U.S. Representative | Succeeded by Peter Barca as Former U.S. Representative |
