= 2018 Wisconsin Supreme Court election =

- April 3, 2018
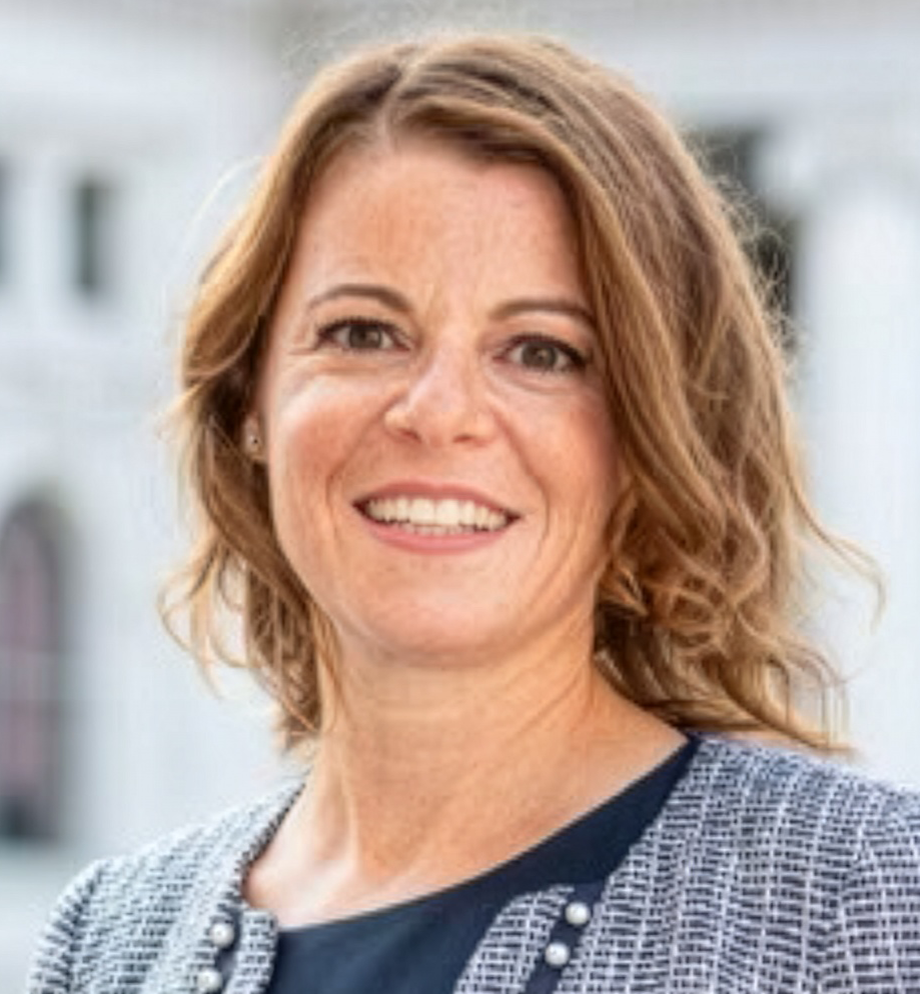

Candidate	Rebecca Dallet	Michael Screnock
Popular vote	555,848	440,808
Percentage	55.72%	44.19%
- County results Dallet: 50–60% 60–70% 80–90% Screnock: 50–60% 60–70%
Justice before election
Michael Gableman
Elected Justice
Rebecca Dallet

The 2018 Wisconsin Supreme Court election was held on April 3, 2018 to elect a justice to the Wisconsin Supreme Court for a ten-year term. The incumbent justice, Michael Gableman, retired rather than seek another term. Milwaukee County circuit court judge Rebecca Dallet defeated Sauk County circuit court judge Michael Screnock, shifting the ideology of the court towards liberals.

Dallet's landslide victory was seen as a sign of Democratic enthusiasm ahead of the 2018 midterm elections in November. Reacting to the results of the election, Governor Scott Walker warned that Republicans were at risk of a blue wave in Wisconsin. Walker's prediction would turn out to be true, as he lost re-election and Democrats won all five statewide races in the fall Wisconsin elections.

== Primary election ==
=== Candidates ===
==== Advanced ====
- Rebecca Dallet, judge of the Milwaukee County Circuit Court (Branch 40)
- Michael Screnock, judge of the Sauk County Circuit Court (Branch 1)

==== Eliminated in primary ====
- Tim Burns, insurance attorney

==== Declined ====
- Michael Gableman, incumbent Supreme Court justice

=== Endorsements ===
Tim Burns

U.S. representatives

- Mark Pocan, U.S. representative for Wisconsin's 2nd congressional district (Democratic)

County officials

- Kathleen Falk, former Dane County executive (1997–2011) (Democratic)

Judicial officials

- JoAnne Kloppenburg, judge of the Wisconsin Court of Appeals

Organizations

- Citizen Action
- Our Revolution

Newspapers and other media

- The Cap Times (co-endorsement with Dallet)
- The Shepherd Express (co-endorsement with Dallet)
Rebecca Dallet

Judicial officials

- Kitty Brennan, judge of the Wisconsin Court of Appeals
- Louis Butler, former justice of the Wisconsin Supreme Court (2004–2008)
- Lisa Stark, judge of the Wisconsin Court of Appeals

County officials

- John Chisholm, Milwaukee County District Attorney (Democratic)
- Mike Graveley, Kenosha County District Attorney
- Ismael Ozanne, Dane County District Attorney (Democratic)

Labor unions

- AFT-Wisconsin

Newspapers and other media

- The Cap Times (co-endorsement with Tim Burns)
- The Shepherd Express (co-endorsement with Tim Burns)
Michael Screnock

Judicial officials

- Rebecca Bradley, justice of the Wisconsin Supreme Court
- Mike Gableman, justice of the Wisconsin Supreme Court
- Mark Gundrum, judge of the Wisconsin Court of Appeals
- Brian Hagedorn, judge of the Wisconsin Court of Appeals
- Dan Kelly, justice of the Wisconsin Supreme Court
- David Prosser, former justice of the Wisconsin Supreme Court (1998–2016)
- Jon Wilcox, former justice of the Wisconsin Supreme Court (1992–2007)

Organizations

- Wisconsin Realtors Association
- Wisconsin Right to Life PAC

Political parties

- Wisconsin Republican Party

=== Forums ===
2018 Wisconsin Supreme Court candidate forums
No.	Date	Host	Moderator	Link	Candidates		
Key: P Participant A Absent N Not invited I Invited W Withdrawn							
Key: P Participant A Absent N Not invited I Invited W Withdrawn					Tim Burns	Rebecca Dallet	Michael Screnock
1	August 11, 2017	American Constitution Society	Jeff Bowen		P	P	N
2	January 22, 2018	The Federalist Society	Ryan Owens		P	P	P
3	February 5, 2018	Milwaukee Bar Association	John DiMotto		P	P	P
4	February 13, 2018	Brown County Medical Society	–		P	P	N

=== Fundraising ===
Campaign finance reports as of February 5, 2018
Candidate	Raised	Spent	Cash on hand
Tim Burns	$337,310	$211,373	$125,937
Rebecca Dallet	$587,571	$363,764	$237,090
Michael Screnock	$318,321	$228,187	$90,212
Source: WI Ethics Commission

=== Results ===
2018 Wisconsin Supreme Court primary election
Candidate	Votes	%
Michael Screnock	247,582	46.28%
Rebecca Dallet	191,268	35.75%
Tim Burns	95,508	17.85%
Write-in	622	0.12%
Total votes	534,980	100.0%

== General election ==
=== Post-primary endorsements ===
Rebecca Dallet

Federal officials

- Tammy Baldwin, U.S. senator from Wisconsin
- Joe Biden, 47th vice president of the United States (2009–2017)
- Cory Booker, U.S. senator from New Jersey
- Herb Kohl, former U.S. senator from Wisconsin (1989–2013)

State officials

- Jim Doyle, former Governor of Wisconsin (2003–2011)

County officials

- Kathleen Falk, former Dane County executive (1997–2011)
- Tom Nelson, Outagamie County executive

Judicial officials

- Shirley Abrahamson, justice of the Wisconsin Supreme Court
- Ann Walsh Bradley, justice of the Wisconsin Supreme Court
- ~~Ellen Brostrom~~, judge of the Milwaukee County Circuit Court, daughter of Chief Justice Pat Roggensack
- JoAnne Kloppenburg, judge of the Wisconsin Court of Appeals

Organizations

- Giffords
- NARAL Pro-Choice America
- Planned Parenthood Advocates of Wisconsin

Labor unions

- AFSCME Wisconsin Council 32
- Professional Firefighters of Wisconsin
- SEIU Wisconsin State Council
- WI AFL-CIO

Political parties

- Wisconsin Democratic Party
- Wisconsin Working Families Party

Newspapers and other media

- The Cap Times
- The Shepherd Express
- Wisconsin State Journal
Michael Screnock

Judicial officials

- Annette Ziegler, justice of the Wisconsin Supreme Court

Organizations

- NRA Political Victory Fund
- Wisconsin Farm Bureau Federation
- Wisconsin Fraternal Order of Police

=== Debates ===
2018 Wisconsin Supreme Court candidate debates
No.	Date	Host	Moderator	Link	Candidates	
Key: P Participant A Absent N Not invited I Invited W Withdrawn						
Key: P Participant A Absent N Not invited I Invited W Withdrawn					Rebecca Dallet	Michael Screnock
1	March 2, 2018	WISN-TV; Marquette University Law School	Mike Gousha		P	P
2	March 26, 2018	Milwaukee Bar Association; WisconsinEye	Steve Walters		P	P
3	March 30, 2018	Wisconsin Public Radio; PBS Wisconsin	Frederica Freyberg; Shawn Johnson		P	P

=== Fundraising ===
Outside spending by groups reached up to $1.7 million, a week before the general election. Wisconsin Manufacturers & Commerce spent $940k in support of Screnock, while Dallet received support from the Greater Wisconsin Committee, totaling $655k.

Campaign finance reports as of June 30, 2018
Candidate	Raised	Spent	Cash on hand
Rebecca Dallet	$680,963	$911,848	$6,204
Michael Screnock	$758,024	$836,836	$11,401
Source: WI Ethics Commission

=== Results ===
2018 Wisconsin Supreme Court election
Candidate	Votes	%
Rebecca Dallet	555,848	55.72%
Michael Screnock	440,808	44.19%
Write-in	829	0.08%
Total votes	997,485	100.0%
