= 1995 Wisconsin Supreme Court election =

- April 4, 1995
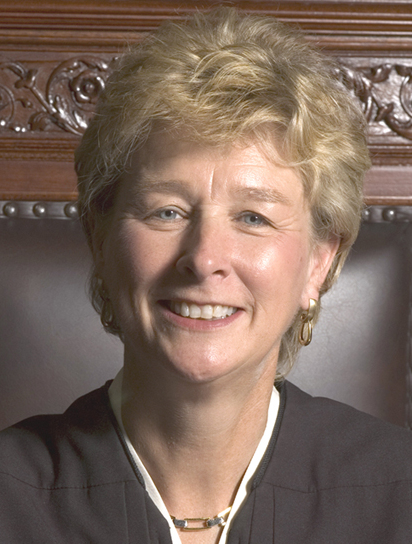

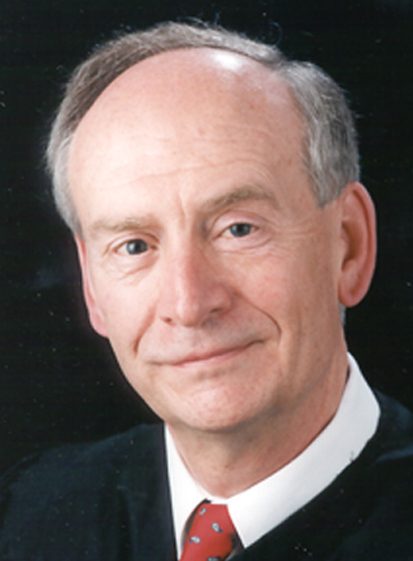
Candidate	Ann Walsh Bradley	N. Patrick Crooks
Popular vote	514,588	424,110
Percentage	54.82%	45.18%
- County results Bradley: 50–60% 60–70% 70–80% Crooks: 50–60% 60–70% 70–80%
Justice before election
Nathan Heffernan
Elected Justice
Ann Walsh Bradley

The 1995 Wisconsin Supreme Court election was held on April 4, 1995 to elect a justice to the Wisconsin Supreme Court for a ten-year term. The Incumbent justice, Chief Justice Nathan Heffernan, retired after nearly 31 years on the court. Although the Wisconsin Supreme Court justices are considered nonpartisan, Heffernan was identified as a liberal and voted with other liberals on the court. Wisconsin circuit court judge Ann Walsh Bradley (a liberal) defeated fellow circuit court judge N. Patrick Crooks (a conservative).

== Primary election ==
=== Candidates ===
==== Advanced ====
- Ann Walsh Bradley, Circuit court judge for the Marathon County circuit, branch 3
- N. Patrick Crooks, Circuit court judge for the Brown County circuit, branch 6

==== Eliminated in primary ====
- William A. Pangman, attorney
- Patience D. Roggensack, attorney
- Ted E. Wedemeyer Jr., district 1 judge of the Wisconsin Court of Appeals (1982–88; since 1992)

==== Declined ====
- Nathan Heffernan, incumbent justice

=== Primary campaign ===
Bradley, a liberal with bipartisan support, attempted to maintain a level of political independence in her campaign. She criticized Crooks' campaign for emphasizing his endorsements from Republican governor Tommy Thompson and members of his administration. In response, Bradley touted her own set of bipartisan support and endorsements, which included former Democratic governor Tony Earl and Sue Ann Thompson – Tommy Thompson's wife. In addition, Bradley criticized attempts to polarize the race along party lines, arguing that the most qualified person should be the one to get the nomination.

=== Primary results ===
Primary results by county: Bradley: Bradley—30–40%; Bradley—40–50%; Bradley—50–60%; Bradley—60–70%; Bradley—70–80%; Bradley—80–90%; Crooks: Crooks—30–40%; Crooks—40–50%; Crooks—60–70%; Wedemeyer: Wedemeyer—30–40%

1995 Wisconsin Supreme Court primary election
Candidate	Votes	%
Ann Walsh Bradley	131,889	38.85%
N. Patrick Crooks	88,913	26.19%
Ted E. Wedemeyer Jr.	64,668	19.05%
Patience D. Roggensack	41,303	12.16%
William A. Pangman	12,753	3.76%
Total votes	339,526	100.0%

== General election ==
=== General campaign ===
After advancing to the general election, Bradley reiterated her desire to see the race politicized by her opponents. During the campaign, Bradley was identified as a liberal and had gained the endorsements of several liberal judges in the state. During the campaign, Crooks identified himself as a conservative, and was aligned with Republicans, who worked on his campaign.

Bradley was endorsed by the outgoing justice, Heffernan.

The following year, the editorial board of the La Crosse Tribune summarized the general election campaign,

Ann Walsh Bradley had sewn up, early in the campaign, an impressive list of endorsements from across the political spectrum: judges, police, labor, business, legislators and leaders from both political parties. So Crooks took a hard right after the primaries and his campaign blurred the lines between the judicial and the political, employing the term "conservative" – a legitimate description of Crooks' judicial philosophy – in a blatant attempt to round up the Republican vote. The strategy failed.

=== Results ===
1995 Wisconsin Supreme Court general election
Candidate	Votes	%	±
Ann Walsh Bradley	514,588	54.82%	N/A
N. Patrick Crooks	424,110	45.18%	N/A
Majority	90,478	9.64%	
Total votes	938,698	100.0%	

== Aftermath ==
Bradley would later be re-elected in 2005 and 2015. Crooks would later join the court after winning election in 1996; later being re-elected in 2006. Roggensack also later joined the court after winning election in 2003; later being re-elected in 2013. Wedemeyer ran for the court once again in 1996, again failing to advance past the primary.

During her campaign, Bradley had accepted the endorsement and a financial contribution from the political committee of the Wisconsin Education Association Council (WEAC). This motivated her, in her first year on the court, to recuse herself from a case involving the expansion of school choice to religious schools (which WEAC was opposed to).

== See also ==
- 1995 Wisconsin elections
