= 2017 Wisconsin elections =

- April 4, 2017

The 2017 Wisconsin Spring Election was held in the U.S. state of Wisconsin on April 4, 2017. The top of the ballot was the election for state Superintendent of Public Instruction. There was also an uncontested election for Wisconsin Supreme Court, three uncontested elections for Wisconsin Court of Appeals, and several other nonpartisan local and judicial elections. There were also a number of local referendums for school funding. The 2017 Wisconsin Spring Primary was held February 21, 2017.

In the election for Superintendent of Public Instruction, incumbent Tony Evers won a third term. He would not complete the term, however, as he was elected Governor of Wisconsin the following year.

== State elections ==
=== Executive ===
==== Superintendent of Public Instruction ====
2017 Wisconsin Superintendent of Public Instruction election
- April 4, 2017
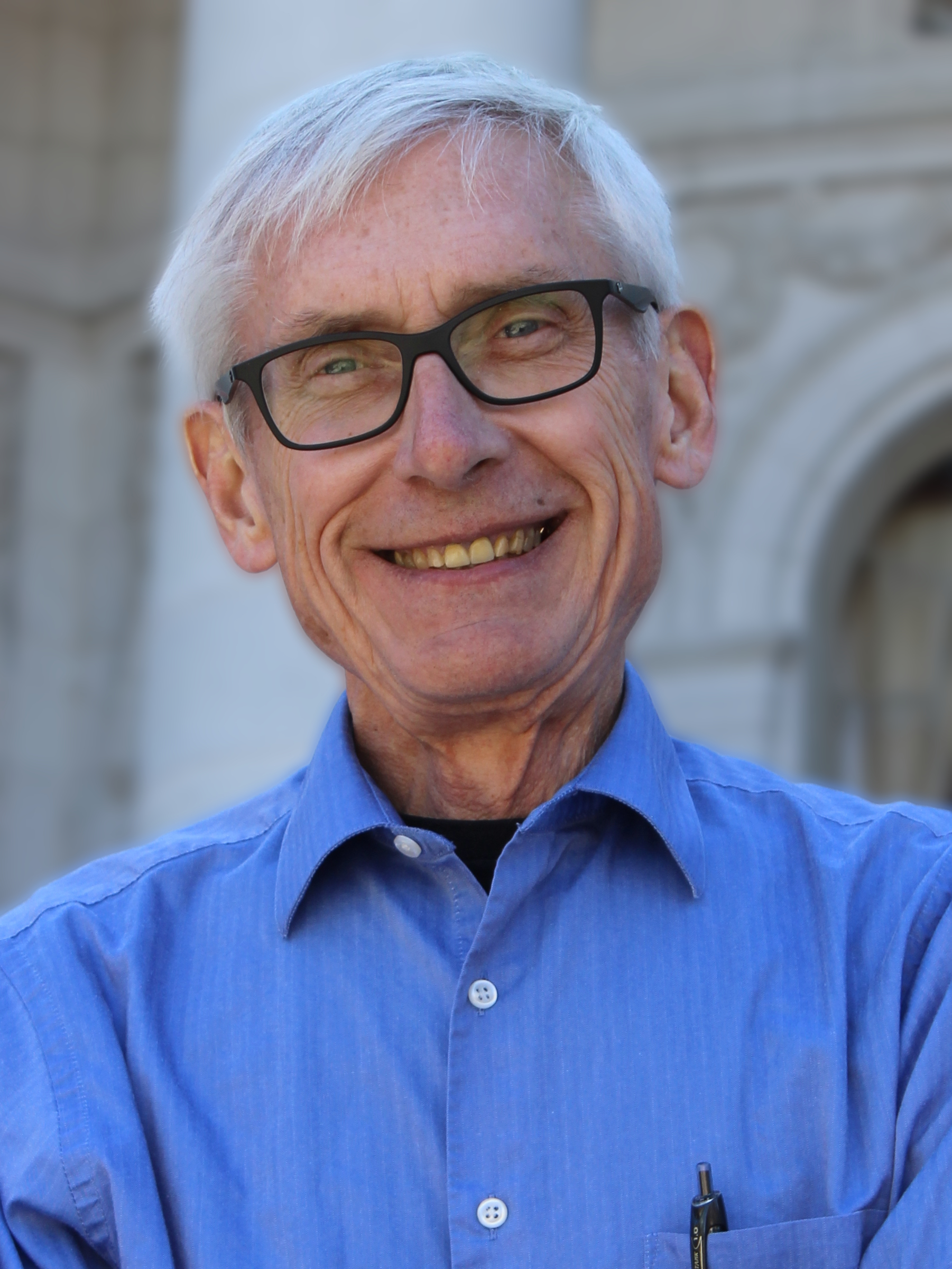

Nominee	Tony Evers	Lowell Holtz
Popular vote	494,793	212,504
Percentage	69.86%	30.00%
- County results Evers: 50–60% 60–70% 70–80% 80–90% Holtz: 50–60%
Superintendent before election
Tony Evers
Nonpartisan
Elected Superintendent
Tony Evers
Nonpartisan

Incumbent Superintendent of Public Instruction Tony Evers easily defeated challenger Lowell E. Holtz, taking nearly 70% of the vote. Evers' performance in this statewide election would prove useful as he made his case in a crowded Democratic primary field for Governor of Wisconsin in 2018.

Primary county results Evers: 40–50%; 50–60%; 60–70%; 70–80%; 80–90%; Holtz: 40–50%; 50–60%

Wisconsin Superintendent of Public Instruction Election, 2017
Party	Candidate	Votes	%	±%
Primary Election, February 21, 2017
Nonpartisan	Tony Evers (incumbent)	255,552	69.43%	
Nonpartisan	Lowell E. Holtz	84,398	22.93%	
Nonpartisan	John Humphries	27,066	7.35%	
Nonpartisan	Rick Melcher (Write-in)	377	0.10%	
	Scattering	703	0.19%	
Total votes		368,096	100.0%	
General Election, April 4, 2017
Nonpartisan	Tony Evers (incumbent)	494,793	69.86%	+7.71%
Nonpartisan	Lowell E. Holtz	212,504	30.00%	
Nonpartisan	Rick Melcher (write-in)	62	0.01%	
	Scattering	930	0.13%	−0.04%
Plurality		282,289	39.86%	+17.39%
Total votes		708,289	100.0%	-11.08%

=== Judicial ===
==== State Supreme Court ====
2017 Wisconsin Supreme Court election
- April 4, 2017
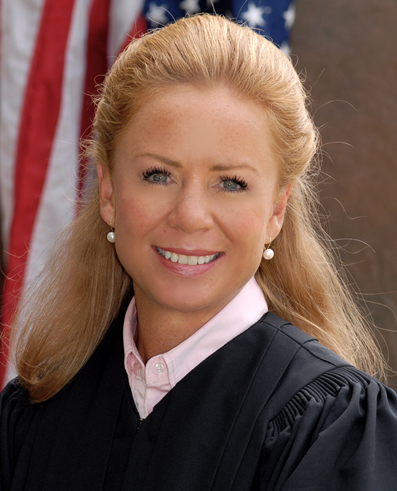
Candidate	Annette Ziegler
Popular vote	492,352
Percentage	97.20%
- County results Ziegler: 80–90% >90%
Justice before election
Annette Ziegler
Elected Justice
Annette Ziegler

A regularly scheduled Wisconsin Supreme Court election was held this year. Incumbent Annette Ziegler was unopposed seeking her second ten-year term.

This was the first unopposed supreme court election since 2006. As of 2026, it is the most recent. As of 2026, this is also the most recent instance in which an incumbent justice has won re-election to the court.

The lack of any liberal challenger to the conservative Ziegler was a factor in the ability of conservatives to hold an uninterrupted majority on the court from 2008 until 2023.

2017 Wisconsin Supreme Court election
Party	Candidate	Votes	%
Nonpartisan	Annette Ziegler (incumbent)	492,352	97.20%
Write-in		14,165	2.80%
Total votes		506,517	100.0%

==== State Court of Appeals ====
Three seats on the Wisconsin Court of Appeals were up for election in 2017. All three were uncontested.

- In District I, Judge William W. Brash III, appointed by Governor Scott Walker in 2015, was unopposed seeking election to his first full term.
- In District II, Judge Brian Hagedorn, also appointed by Governor Scott Walker in 2015, was unopposed seeking election to his first full term.
- In District IV, Rock County Circuit Court Judge Michael R. Fitzpatrick was unopposed in the election to succeed retiring judge Paul B. Higginbotham.

==== State Circuit Courts ====
Forty eight of the state's 249 circuit court seats were up for election in 2017. Eleven of those seats were contested. No incumbent judge was defeated in the general election, but Trempealeau County judge Charles V. Feltes was defeated in the February primary. Feltes had been appointed by Governor Scott Walker the previous July.

Circuit	Branch	Incumbent	Elected			Defeated			Defeated in Primary
Circuit	Branch	Incumbent	Name	Votes	%	Name	Votes	%	Name(s)
Burnett		Kenneth Kutz	Melissia R. Christianson Mogen	1,850	63.03%	David Grindell	1,085	36.97%	
Columbia	2	W. Andrew Voigt	W. Andrew Voigt	5,024	99.31%				
Dane	9	Richard G. Niess	Richard G. Niess	58,785	99.11%				
Dane	12	Clayton Kawski	Jill J. Karofsky	50,585	57.54%	Marilyn Townsend	37,110	42.21%	
Dodge	2	Martin De Vries	Martin De Vries	7,988	64.09%	Randall E. Doyle	4,476	35.91%	
Door	2	David L. Weber	David L. Weber	5,426	99.12%				
Fond du Lac	5	Robert Wirtz	Robert Wirtz	9,140	99.66%				
Grant	1	Robert P. VanDeHey	Robert P. VanDeHey	6,086	99.51%				
Green Lake		Mark Slate	Mark Slate	1,643	99.58%				
Iron		Patrick J. Madden	Patrick J. Madden	1,081	98.45%				
Jefferson	4	Randy R. Koschnick	Bennett J. Brantmeier	6,087	98.94%				
Kenosha	4	Anthony Milisauskas	Anthony Milisauskas	10,390	99.16%				
Kenosha	7	Jodi L. Meier	Jodi L. Meier	12,386	85.10%	John Anthony Ward	2,145	14.74%	
Manitowoc	3	Jerome L. Fox	Bob Dewane	7,646	55.03%	Patricia Koppa	6,217	44.75%	Donald J. Chewning
Marathon	4	Gregory J. Strasser	Gregory J. Strasser	12,528	99.52%				
Marathon	5	Michael K. Moran	Michael K. Moran	12,780	99.58%				
Milwaukee	1	Maxine Aldridge White	Maxine Aldridge White	55,038	98.90%				
Milwaukee	4	Michael J. Hanrahan	Michael J. Hanrahan	52,096	98.81%				
Milwaukee	9	Paul Van Grunsven	Paul Van Grunsven	51,192	98.80%				
Milwaukee	10	Vacant	Michelle Ackerman Havas	52,032	98.71%				
Milwaukee	13	Mary E. Triggiano	Mary E. Triggiano	52,348	99.02%				
Milwaukee	18	Pedro Colón	Pedro Colón	54,247	98.80%				
Milwaukee	19	Dennis R. Cimpl	Dennis R. Cimpl	51,670	98.93%				
Milwaukee	21	Cynthia Davis	Cynthia Davis	52,464	98.96%				
Milwaukee	33	Carl Ashley	Carl Ashley	52,473	99.11%				
Milwaukee	35	Frederick C. Rosa	Frederick C. Rosa	52,864	98.89%				
Milwaukee	36	Jeffrey Kremers	Jeffrey Kremers	52,611	98.69%				
Milwaukee	47	John Siefert	Kristy Yang	49,342	57.20%	Scott A. Wales	36,705	42.55%	
Oconto	1	Michael T. Judge	Michael T. Judge	4,846	100.0%				
Outagamie	1	Mark J. McGinnis	Mark J. McGinnis	14,032	100.0%				
Polk	1	Daniel J. Tolan	Daniel J. Tolan	4,839	60.06%	Malia Malone	3,218	39.94%	David D. Danielson
Polk	2	Jeff Anderson	Jeff Anderson	6,959	100.0%				
Racine	3	Emily S. Mueller	Emily S. Mueller	15,242	100.0%				
Rock	6	John M. Wood	John M. Wood	11,822	99.13%				
Sheboygan	2	Kent Hoffmann	Kent Hoffmann	10,159	99.65%				
Sheboygan	3	Angela W. Sutkiewicz	Angela W. Sutkiewicz	10,722	99.55%				
Sheboygan	5	Daniel Borowski	Daniel Borowski	10,143	99.46%				
Trempealeau		Charles V. Feltes	Rian W. Radtke	2,856	52.29%	Rick Schaumberg	2,594	47.49%	Charles V. Feltes
Vernon		Michael J. Rosborough	Darcy Rood	3,253	56.43%	Timothy J. Gaskell	2,512	43.57%	
Washington	1	James G. Porous	James G. Porous	10,004	99.32%				
Washington	3	Todd K. Martens	Todd K. Martens	8,903	73.32%	Robert T. Olson	3,210	26.44%	
Waukesha	3	Ralph M. Ramirez	Ralph M. Ramirez	31,937	99.33%				
Waukesha	3	Lloyd V. Carter	Lloyd V. Carter	30,757	99.29%				
Waukesha	4	William Domina	William Domina	31,326	99.31%				
Waupaca	1	Philip M. Kirk	Troy L. Nielsen	4,522	63.74%	Eric D. Hendrickson	2,568	36.19%	
Waushara		Guy Dutcher	Guy Dutcher	2,078	100.0%				
Winnebago	2	Scott C. Woldt	Scott C. Woldt	11,811	99.18%				
Winnebago	6	Daniel J. Bissett	Daniel J. Bissett	11,715	99.26%				

== Local elections ==
=== Madison ===
Dane County Executive Joe Parisi won re-election without opposition.

=== Racine ===
In Racine's special mayoral election, held in October, State Assemblymember Cory Mason was elected to fill the remainder of Mayor John Dickert's unexpired term. Mason topped a six-person primary and went on to defeat Alderman Sandy Weidner in the special election.

=== School referendums ===
There were 65 local education-funding referendums on the ballot in the 2017 election. 40 of those referendums passed, awarding the school districts approximately $700 million in additional funding.
