= Charles B. Schudson =

Retired American judge (born 1950)

The Honorable Charles B. Schudson
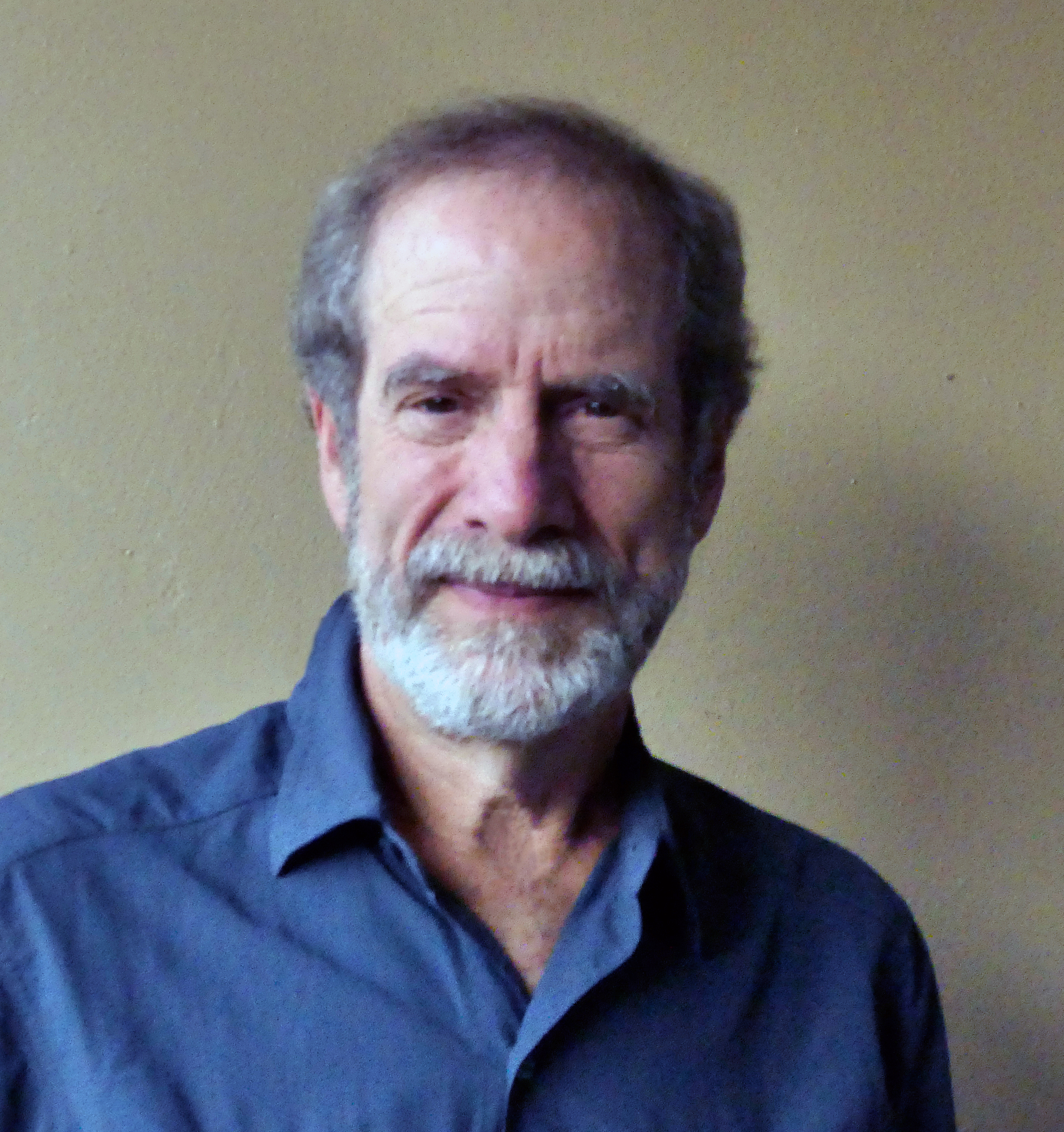

Judge of the Wisconsin Court of Appeals for the 1st district
- In office August 1, 1992 – July 31, 2004
- Preceded by: William R. Moser
- Succeeded by: Joan F. Kessler

Wisconsin Circuit Court Judge for the Milwaukee Circuit, Branch 1
- In office June 4, 1982 – July 31, 1992
- Appointed by: Lee S. Dreyfus
- Preceded by: Louis J. Ceci
- Succeeded by: Maxine Aldridge White

Personal details
- Born: Charles Benjamin Schudson; 1950 (age 75–76) Milwaukee, Wisconsin
- Spouse: Karen
- Education: Dartmouth College; University of Wisconsin Law School (J.D.)
- Website: Charles Benjamin Schudson

Charles Benjamin Schudson (born 1950) is a retired American lawyer, jurist, and author from Milwaukee, Wisconsin. He served 12 years as a judge of the Wisconsin Court of Appeals, and served 10 years before that as a Wisconsin circuit court judge in Milwaukee County. He previously served as an assistant district attorney in Milwaukee.

== Biography ==
Schudson was born in Milwaukee, Wisconsin, in 1950. He is a graduate of Dartmouth College (Class of 1972) and the University of Wisconsin Law School. Schudson and his wife, Karen, have two children and five grandchildren.

== Career ==
Schudson worked as a state and federal prosecutor from 1975 until 1982, when he was appointed to the Wisconsin Circuit Court by Governor Lee Sherman Dreyfus. In 1992, he was elected to the Wisconsin Court of Appeals, where he served twelve years. Subsequent to his judicial career, he served as senior counsel at von Briesen & Roper, S.C., and as General Counsel for La Causa, Inc.

Shudson was an unsuccessful candidate in the 1996 Wisconsin Supreme Court election.

Throughout and following his judicial career, Schudson served on the faculties of Marquette University Law School, University of Wisconsin Law School, the National Council of Juvenile and Family Court Judges, and the National Judicial College. For Lawrence University, he has served as the “Law and Literature Scholar in Residence,” and, for fifteen years and currently, as a presenter for Lawrence’s “Björklunden Seminars.” Teaching at law schools in Bolivia, Germany, and Peru, 2009–14, he served as a Fulbright Scholar.

Schudson has presented keynotes and seminars at approximately three hundred judicial and professional conferences throughout the world. He has testified before congressional committees and the U.S. Commission on Civil Rights on battered women; he was the lead witness before the U.S. Senate Judiciary Committee hearings on child sexual abuse. He has been featured on NPR’s All Things Considered, PBS’s The MacNeil-Lehrer Report, and Oprah.

For his work in the investigation and prosecution of Medicaid fraud and nursing home crimes, Schudson received the U.S. Justice Department’s Award for Superior Performance. During his judicial career, he received honors including: Wisconsin Judge of the Year; Foundation for the Improvement of Justice Award; and the National Human Rights Leadership Award.

Schudson has authored hundreds of published appellate decisions and other works, including: On Trial / America’s Courts and Their Treatment of Sexually Abused Children ( Beacon Press 1989; 2d ed., 1991); and Independence Corrupted / How America’s Judges Make Their Decisions (University of Wisconsin Press, 2018; Amazon Kindle 2022), winner of the Figure Foundation grant, and a nominee for the ABA Silver Gavel Award, the Chautauqua Prize, and the National Book Award.

== Electoral history ==
=== Wisconsin Circuit Court (1983, 1989) ===
Wisconsin Circuit Court, Milwaukee Circuit, Branch 1 Election, 1983
Party	Candidate	Votes	%	±%
General Election, April 5, 1983
Nonpartisan	Charles B. Schudson (incumbent)	40,585	58.69%	
Nonpartisan	James F. Blask	28,562	41.31%	
Total votes		'69,147'	'100.0%'	

Wisconsin Circuit Court, Milwaukee Circuit, Branch 1 Election, 1989
Party	Candidate	Votes	%	±%
General Election, April 4, 1989
Nonpartisan	Charles B. Schudson (incumbent)	95,304	100.0%	
Total votes		'95,304'	'100.0%'	+37.83%

=== Wisconsin Court of Appeals (1992, 1998, 2004) ===
Wisconsin Court of Appeals, District I Election, 1992
Party	Candidate	Votes	%	±%
General Election, April 7, 1992
Nonpartisan	Charles B. Schudson	173,545	100.0%	
Total votes		'173,545'	'100.0%'	

Wisconsin Court of Appeals, District I Election, 1998
Party	Candidate	Votes	%	±%
General Election, April 7, 1998
Nonpartisan	Charles B. Schudson (incumbent)	52,173	100.0%	
Total votes		'52,173'	'100.0%'	-27.79%

Wisconsin Court of Appeals, District I Election, 2004
Party	Candidate	Votes	%	±%
General Election, April 6, 2004
Nonpartisan	Joan F. Kessler	106,640	50.62%	
Nonpartisan	Charles B. Schudson (incumbent)	102,980	48.89%	
	Scattering	1,035	0.49%	
Total votes		'210,655'	'100.0%'	+213.87%

=== Wisconsin Supreme Court (1996) ===
1996 Wisconsin Supreme Court election
Party	Candidate	Votes	%	±%
General Election, February 6, 1996
Nonpartisan	N. Patrick Crooks	84,223	27.03	
Nonpartisan	Ralph Adam Fine	50,801	16.31	
Nonpartisan	Ted E. Wedemeyer Jr.	44,988	14.44	
Nonpartisan	Lawrence J. Bugge	44,020	14.13	
Nonpartisan	Harold Vernon Froehlich	34,632	11.12	
Nonpartisan	Stanley A. Miller	28,047	9.00	
Nonpartisan	Charles B. Schudson	24,853	7.98	
Total votes		311,564	100	
General Election, March 19, 1996
Nonpartisan	N. Patrick Crooks	520,594	59.07	
Nonpartisan	Ralph Adam Fine	360,686	40.93	
Total votes		881,280	100	-6.12

Legal offices
Preceded by Louis J. Ceci	Wisconsin Circuit Court Judge for the Milwaukee Circuit, Branch 1; 1982–1992	Succeeded by Maxine Aldridge White
Preceded by William R. Moser	Judge of the Wisconsin Court of Appeals for the 1st district 1992–2004	Succeeded by Joan F. Kessler
