= N. Patrick Crooks =

American judge and lawyer (1938–2015)

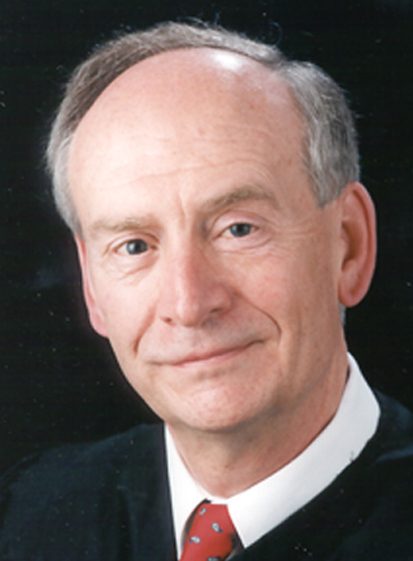
- 2009 portrait

Justice of the Wisconsin Supreme Court
- In office August 1, 1996 – September 21, 2015
- Preceded by: Roland B. Day
- Succeeded by: Rebecca Bradley

Wisconsin Circuit Court Judge for the Brown Circuit, Branch 6
- In office August 1, 1978 – July 31, 1996
- Preceded by: Position established
- Succeeded by: John D. McKay

Personal details
- Born: Neil Patrick Crooks; May 16, 1938 Green Bay, Wisconsin, U.S.
- Died: September 21, 2015 (aged 77) Madison, Wisconsin, U.S.
- Spouse: Kristin
- Children: Michael; Molly; Kevin; Kathleen; Peggy; Eileen
- Education: St. Norbert College (B.A.); University of Notre Dame (J.D.)

Military service
- Allegiance: United States
- Branch/service: United States Army
- Years of service: 1963–1966
- Unit: Judge Advocate General's Corps

Neil Patrick Crooks (May 16, 1938 – September 21, 2015) was an American judge and lawyer. He was a justice of the Wisconsin Supreme Court from 1996 until his death in 2015. He was appointed as a county judge by a Democratic governor, later professing conservatism as a Supreme Court candidate in 1995 and 1996. In his later years, Crooks gained notice as a perceived judicial moderate and swing vote on a court otherwise divided into two ideological blocs.

== Early life and career ==
Crooks was a native of Green Bay, Wisconsin, and graduated from the city's Premontre High School in 1956. He received a B.A. degree from St. Norbert College in 1960 and a J.D. degree from the University of Notre Dame in 1963.

From 1963 to 1966, Crooks served as an officer in the United States Army, assigned to the Judge Advocate General's Corps in the Pentagon. After his discharge from the Army, Crooks worked for eleven years as a private practice attorney in Green Bay and as an instructor of business law at the University of Wisconsin–Green Bay.

In 1977, Crooks was appointed to the Brown County Court by Governor Martin J. Schreiber, a liberal Democrat. Crooks was designated a circuit court judge in 1978, when Wisconsin's county and circuit courts were merged.

Although appointed by Schreiber, Crooks ran for the Wisconsin Supreme Court in 1995 as a conservative; his campaign was directed by Scott Jensen, a prominent Republican legislator later convicted of criminal ethics violations. He was defeated in the general election by Marathon County circuit judge Ann Walsh Bradley but elected to the court in 1996, defeating appellate judge Ralph Adam Fine of Milwaukee after a contentious campaign.

== Supreme Court service ==
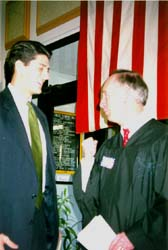
Crooks with Paul Ryan in 1999

In 1999, Crooks became enmeshed in a factional dispute on the court, aligning with justices Donald Steinmetz, William Bablitch, and Jon Wilcox against Bradley, Chief Justice Shirley Abrahamson, and Justice David T. Prosser, Jr. The dispute arose from numerous controversies and the unsuccessful attempt of Green Bay lawyer Sharren Rose to unseat Abrahamson; Crooks had supported Rose.

Crooks had run for the court in the 1990s as an ideological conservative. By 2005, the court's justices had aligned into different blocs, now defined more closely by ideology. His participation in decisions lifting a medical malpractice damages cap and permitting a lawsuit against lead paint manufacturers disassociated him from the court's conservative bloc. Since 2005, Crooks acted at times as a swing vote on the court, sometimes associated ideologically with liberal justices Abrahamson and Bradley. Some commentators identified him as a judicial liberal, some classified him as a centrist who retained strong conservative leanings, others classified him as a centrist with liberal leanings, and others classified him a generally reliable conservative who had some notable breaks from fellow conservatives. Crooks generally joined the conservative majority's opinions, especially in criminal matters, but joined the liberal minority's dissents on certain constitutional issues and matters of court administration.

In April 2015, Crooks broke from both Abrahamson and the conservative majority in a dispute over the election of Patience Drake Roggensack as the court's chief justice. Earlier in 2015, voters had approved a referendum permitting the court's justices to elect their chief justice; throughout Wisconsin's history, the most senior justice had occupied the court's highest office. Crooks condemned Abrahamson's attempts to retain her position, which included a federal lawsuit, but did not support Roggensack's election; instead, he indicated that he would consider seeking the chief justiceship and running for reelection in 2016, an event theretofore considered unlikely.

In the wake of this dispute, and with Crooks's intentions uncertain, state judges Joe Donald, JoAnne Kloppenburg, and Rebecca Bradley filed to run for Crooks's seat in 2016.

== Death ==
On Thursday, September 16, 2015, Crooks announced that he would not seek reelection. Crooks was absent from oral arguments the next day. He came to the court on Monday, September 21, 2015, for a hearing, but excused himself before the hearing was over. He was later found dead in his chambers at the Wisconsin State Capitol in Madison. He was 77.

== Professional memberships and awards ==
While serving in 1994 as a Brown County circuit judge, Crooks was recognized as Trial Judge of the Year by the Wisconsin Chapter of the American Board of Trial Advocates. Crooks was a law school evaluator for the American Bar Association and also a member of the Wisconsin Law Foundation Board. He was a director of the Notre Dame Law Association and a member of the James E. Doyle Chapter of the American Inns of Court.

== Electoral history ==
=== Wisconsin Circuit Court (1985, 1991) ===
Wisconsin Circuit Court, Brown Circuit, Branch 6 Election, 1985
Party	Candidate	Votes	%	±%
General Election, April 2, 1985
Nonpartisan	N. Patrick Crooks (incumbent)	15,815	100.0%	
Total votes		15,815	100.0%	

Wisconsin Circuit Court, Brown Circuit, Branch 6 Election, 1991
Party	Candidate	Votes	%	±%
General Election, April 2, 1991
Nonpartisan	N. Patrick Crooks (incumbent)	33,413	100.0%	
Total votes		33,413	100.0%	

=== Wisconsin Supreme Court (1995) ===
1995 Wisconsin Supreme Court election
Party	Candidate	Votes	%	±%
Primary Election, February 21, 1995
Nonpartisan	Ann Walsh Bradley	131,889	38.85%	
Nonpartisan	N. Patrick Crooks	88,913	26.19%	
Nonpartisan	Ted E. Wedemeyer, Jr.	64,668	19.05%	
Nonpartisan	Patience D. Roggensack	41,303	12.16%	
Nonpartisan	William A. Pangman	12,753	3.76%	
Total votes		339,526	100.0%	
General Election, April 4, 1995
Nonpartisan	Ann Walsh Bradley	514,588	54.82%	
Nonpartisan	N. Patrick Crooks	424,110	45.18%	
Total votes		938,698	100.0%	

=== Wisconsin Supreme Court (1996, 2006) ===
1996 Wisconsin Supreme Court election
Party	Candidate	Votes	%	±%
General Election, February 6, 1996
Nonpartisan	N. Patrick Crooks	84,223	27.03%	
Nonpartisan	Ralph Adam Fine	50,801	16.31%	
Nonpartisan	Ted E. Wedemeyer, Jr.	44,988	14.44%	
Nonpartisan	Lawrence J. Bugge	44,020	14.13%	
Nonpartisan	Harold Vernon Froehlich	34,632	11.12%	
Nonpartisan	Stanley A. Miller	28,047	9.00%	
Nonpartisan	Charles B. Schudson	24,853	7.98%	
Total votes		311,564	100.0%	
General Election, March 19, 1996
Nonpartisan	N. Patrick Crooks	520,594	59.07%	+13.89%
Nonpartisan	Ralph Adam Fine	360,686	40.93%	
Total votes		881,280	100.0%	-6.12%

2006 Wisconsin Supreme Court election
Party	Candidate	Votes	%	±%
General Election, April 4, 2006
Nonpartisan	N. Patrick Crooks	499,636	99.39%	
	Scattering	3,052	0.61%	
Total votes		502,688	100.0%	-9.06%

Legal offices
Preceded by New circuit	Wisconsin Circuit Court Judge for the Brown Circuit, Branch 6; 1978 – 1996	Succeeded by John D. McKay
Preceded by Roland B. Day	Justice of the Wisconsin Supreme Court; 1996 – 2015	Succeeded by Rebecca Bradley
