= Schudson =

Schudson is a surname. Notable people with the surname include:

- Charles B. Schudson (born 1950), American lawyer and judge
- Michael Schudson (born 1946), American sociologist
