= 2015 Wisconsin Supreme Court election =

- April 7, 2015
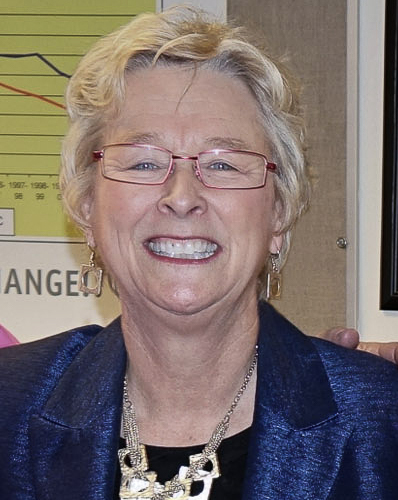

Candidate	Ann Walsh Bradley	James P. Daley
Popular vote	471,866	340,632
Percentage	58.02%	41.89%
- County results Bradley: 50–60% 60–70% 70–80% Daley: 50–60% 60–70%
Justice before election
Ann Walsh Bradley
Elected Justice
Ann Walsh Bradley

The 2015 Wisconsin Supreme Court election was held on April 7, 2015, to elect a justice of the Wisconsin Supreme Court for a ten-year term. Incumbent justice Ann Walsh Bradley, first elected in 1995, won her third ten-year term, defeating Wisconsin circuit court judge James P. Daley with 58% of the vote.

== Candidates ==
- Ann Walsh Bradley, incumbent Justice of the Wisconsin Supreme Court
- James P. Daley, Chief Judge of the 5th Judicial District, Judge of the Rock County Circuit Court (Branch 1)

== Campaign ==
Heading into the election, the court had a conservative ideological majority (4 conservatives, 2 liberals, and 1 centrist). Roggensack was a conservative, Bradley was ideologically liberal, while Daley was ideologically conservative. Conservatives had targeted the election as an opportunity to expand their ideological majority on the court by unseating Bradley.

Bradley criticized Daley's campaign for taking money directly from the Republican Party of Wisconsin. Daley criticized Bradley as an "activist judge".

== Results ==
2015 Wisconsin Supreme Court election
Party	Candidate	Votes	%
Nonpartisan	Ann Walsh Bradley (incumbent)	471,866	58.02
Nonpartisan	James P. Daley	340,632	41.89
Write-in		702	0.09
Total votes		813,200	100.0

== See also ==
- 2015 Wisconsin elections
