= Rebecca Dallet =

American judge (born 1969)

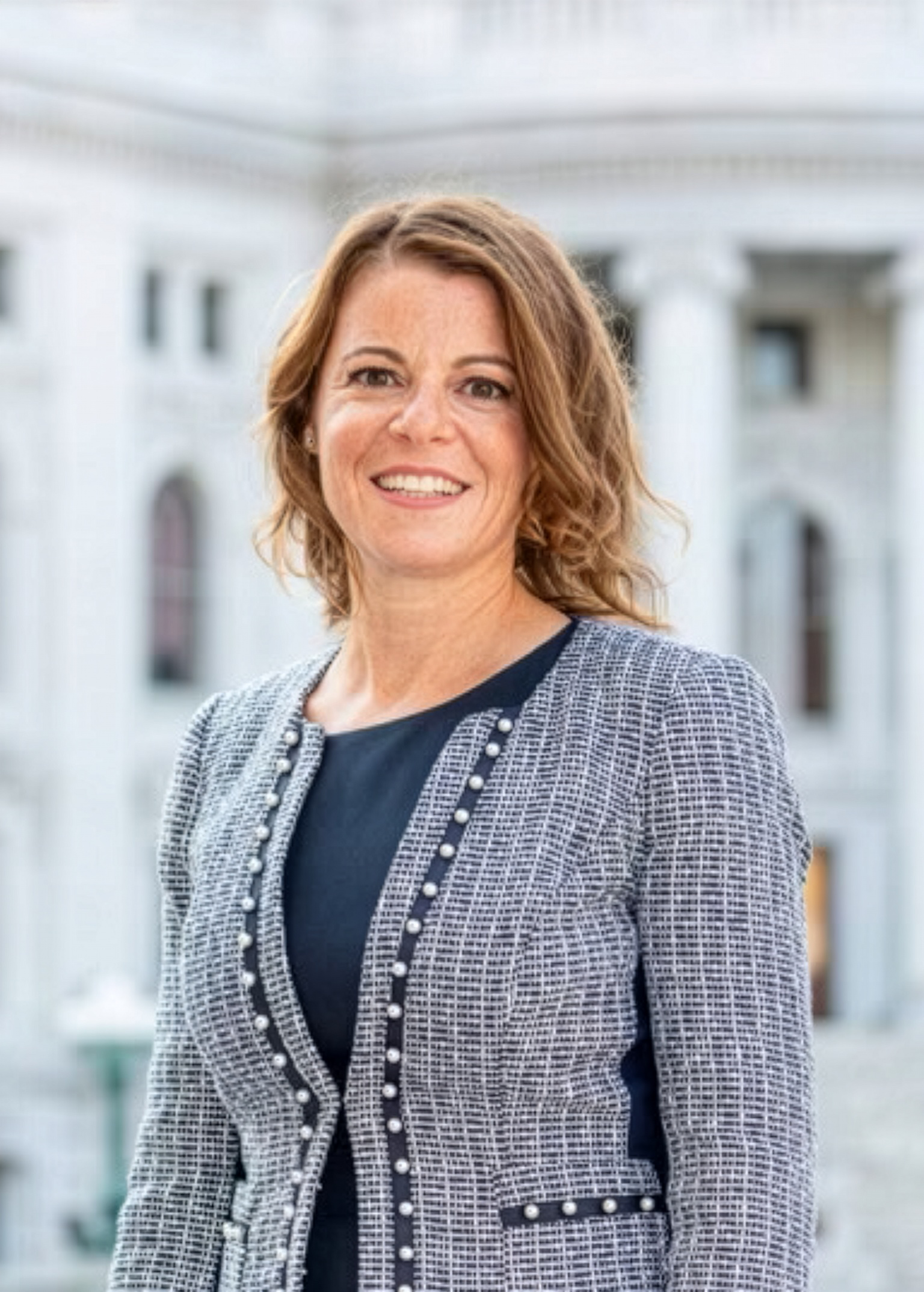
- Dallet in 2022

Justice of the Wisconsin Supreme Court
- Incumbent
- Assumed office August 1, 2018
- Preceded by: Michael Gableman

Judge of the Milwaukee County Circuit Court Branch 40
- In office August 1, 2008 – July 31, 2018
- Succeeded by: Andrew Jones

Personal details
- Born: July 15, 1969 (age 57) Ohio, U.S.
- Education: Ohio State University (BA); Case Western Reserve University (JD)
- Website: Campaign website

Rebecca Frank Dallet (born July 15, 1969) is an American lawyer and a justice of the Wisconsin Supreme Court. Prior to her 2018 election, she served ten years as a Wisconsin Circuit Court Judge in Milwaukee County. Earlier in her career she worked as a prosecutor and appointed court official.

== Early life and career ==
Dallet grew up in Ohio and graduated from Shaker Heights High School. She received a B.A. degree in Economics from Ohio State University, and a J.D. degree from the Case Western Reserve University School of Law. After law school, Dallet served as a Law Clerk for a U.S. magistrate judge. Dallet worked as an Assistant United States Attorney, assistant district attorney with the Milwaukee County District Attorney's Office and as an adjunct professor of law at Marquette University Law School. Dallet was elected as a Judge for the Milwaukee County Circuit Court in 2008, then re-elected in 2014. Prior to her election, Dallet served as President of the Milwaukee Trial Judges Association and Secretary of the Association of Women Lawyers. Dallet previously served one year as the first female presiding court commissioner in Milwaukee County history.

== Wisconsin Supreme Court ==
In 2018, Dallet (a liberal judge) defeated Michael Screenock (a conservative county judge) to win election to the Wisconsin Supreme Court.

Dallet's election to the Supreme Court was the subject of national media coverage. Dallet was endorsed by Democrats like future-President Joe Biden, former United States Attorney General Eric Holder, as well as U.S. Senators Cory Booker and Tammy Baldwin. Dallet was also supported by Former Governor of Wisconsin Jim Doyle, former U.S. Senator Herb Kohl, Wisconsin Supreme Court Justices Shirley Abrahamson and Ann Walsh Bradley, and over 200 state circuit court judges. Dallet spoke at the Wisconsin Women's March in January 2018. Dallet defeated Sauk County Judge Michael Screenock for the seat by a margin of 56% to 44%. Her term began on August 1, 2018.

== Personal life ==
Dallet resides in Whitefish Bay, Wisconsin, with her husband and three children.

== Electoral history ==
=== Wisconsin Circuit Court (2008, 2014) ===
Wisconsin Circuit Court, Milwaukee Circuit, Branch 40 Election, 2008
Party	Candidate	Votes	%	±%
General Election, April 1, 2008
Nonpartisan	Rebecca Dallet	90,029	67.15%	
Nonpartisan	Jeffrey Norman	44,034	32.85%	
Total votes		134,063	100.0%	

Wisconsin Circuit Court, Milwaukee Circuit, Branch 40 Election, 2014
Party	Candidate	Votes	%	±%
General Election, April 24, 2014
Nonpartisan	Rebecca Dallet (incumbent)	39,652	100.0%	
Total votes		39,652	100.0%	

=== Wisconsin Supreme Court (2018) ===
2018 Wisconsin Supreme Court election
Party	Candidate	Votes	%	±%
Primary Election, February 20, 2018
Nonpartisan	Michael Screnock	247,582	46.28%	
Nonpartisan	Rebecca Dallet	191,268	35.75%	
Nonpartisan	Tim Burns	95,508	17.85%	
	Scattering	622	0.12%	
Total votes		534,980	100.0%	
General Election, April 3, 2018
Nonpartisan	Rebecca Dallet	555,848	55.72%	
Nonpartisan	Michael Screnock	440,808	44.19%	
	Scattering	829	0.08%	
Total votes		997,485	100.0%	

Legal offices
Preceded by Michael Gableman	Justice of the Wisconsin Supreme Court; 2018–present	Incumbent
