= Karofsky =

Karofsky is a Jewish surname, deriving from the Israelite priestly “Kohen” class. Notable people with the surname include:

- Dave Karofsky, Glee character
- Jill Karofsky (born 1966), justice on the Wisconsin Supreme Court
- Paul Karofsky, Glee character
