= Joan F. Kessler =

American lawyer, retired judge

The Honorable Joan F. Kessler

Judge of the Wisconsin Court of Appeals District I
- In office August 1, 2004 – February 7, 2020
- Preceded by: Charles B. Schudson
- Succeeded by: Maxine Aldridge White

United States Attorney for the Eastern District of Wisconsin
- In office 1978–1981
- Appointed by: Jimmy Carter
- Preceded by: William J. Mulligan
- Succeeded by: Joseph Peter Stadtmueller

Personal details
- Born: Joan Fowler; 1944 (age 81–82) Louisiana, U.S.
- Spouse: Fred Kessler (m. 1966; died 2024)
- Education: University of Kansas (BA); Marquette Law School (JD)
- Profession: lawyer, judge

Joan Fowler Kessler (born 1944) is an American lawyer and a retired judge of the Wisconsin Court of Appeals, serving from 2004 to 2020. Kessler previously served as United States Attorney for the Eastern District of Wisconsin under President Jimmy Carter, and was the first female U.S. attorney in Wisconsin. She was married to Fred Kessler, who was also an influential Democratic politician and judge in Wisconsin.

== Life and career ==
Joan Kessler was born Joan Fowler in Louisiana; as a child she moved to eastern Kansas with her family, and graduated from Shawnee Mission East High School in 1961. She went on to attend the University of Kansas, where she earned her bachelor's degree in 1966; she immediately went on to attend Marquette University Law School, earning her J.D. in 1968. She worked as a law clerk for United States District Judge John W. Reynolds, Jr., in Milwaukee from 1968 to 1969 before entering private practice. Kessler was a supporter of Jimmy Carter's candidacy for the Democratic presidential nomination in 1976; in 1978, Carter appointed her United States Attorney for the Eastern District of Wisconsin.

As United States Attorney, Kessler received praise for her performance in court and her open-door policy toward criminal defense attorneys, but clashed with Milwaukee City Attorney James Brennan over her investigation into the Milwaukee Police Department's hiring and promotion practices. She resigned in March 1981, following Carter's 1980 defeat to Ronald Reagan, and entered private practice with the Milwaukee firm Foley and Lardner. Kessler specialized as a divorce attorney at Foley and Lardner and was eventually selected as a partner in the firm.

In 2004, Kessler challenged incumbent Wisconsin Court of Appeals Judge Charles B. Schudson for his seat on the court's Milwaukee-based District I. The campaign was hotly contested; Kessler's campaign alleged that Schudson had committed several violations of judicial ethics, charges he vehemently denied; Schudson later levied ethics allegations against Kessler. Kessler unseated Schudson in the April general election, but was not cleared of ethical wrongdoing until 2010.

Kessler has participated in several notable cases during her tenure as an appellate judge. In December 2014, she authored a decision affirming the conviction of Kelly Rindfleisch, deputy chief of staff to Wisconsin Governor Scott Walker when he served as Milwaukee County Executive. In July 2015, Kessler wrote a concurring opinion in a decision reinstating Milwaukee's employee residency rules, which had been voided by a Milwaukee County circuit judge.

== Electoral history ==
=== Wisconsin Court of Appeals (2004, 2010, 2016) ===
Wisconsin Court of Appeals, District I Election, 2004
Party	Candidate	Votes	%	±%
General Election, April 6, 2004
Nonpartisan	Joan F. Kessler	106,640	50.62%	
Nonpartisan	Charles B. Schudson (incumbent)	102,980	48.89%	
	Scattering	1,035	0.49%	
Total votes		'210,655'	'100.0%'	+213.87%

Wisconsin Court of Appeals, District I Election, 2010
Party	Candidate	Votes	%	±%
General Election, April 6, 2010
Nonpartisan	Joan F. Kessler (incumbent)	22,196	97.89%	
	Scattering	478	2.11%	
Total votes		'22,674'	'100.0%'	

Wisconsin Court of Appeals, District I Election, 2016
Party	Candidate	Votes	%	±%
General Election, April 5, 2016
Nonpartisan	Joan F. Kessler (incumbent)	175,733	98.77%	
	Scattering	2,189	1.23%	
Total votes		'177,922'	'100.0%'	

Legal offices
Preceded by William J. Mulligan	United States Attorney for the Eastern District of Wisconsin; 1978 – 1981	Succeeded by Joseph Peter Stadtmueller
Preceded by Charles B. Schudson	Judge of the Wisconsin Court of Appeals District I 2004 – 2020	Succeeded by Maxine Aldridge White
