= William R. Moser =

American politician

The Honorable William R. Moser

Judge of the Wisconsin Court of Appeals District I
- In office August 1, 1978 – July 31, 1992
- Preceded by: Position established
- Succeeded by: Charles B. Schudson

Wisconsin Circuit Court Judge for the 2nd Circuit, Branch 16
- In office January 1, 1967 – August 1, 1978
- Preceded by: Branch established
- Succeeded by: Branch abolished

Member of the Wisconsin Senate from the 6th district
- In office January 1, 1957 – February 1, 1962
- Preceded by: William A. Schmidt
- Succeeded by: Martin J. Schreiber

Personal details
- Born: William Robert Moser; October 14, 1927 Chicago, Illinois
- Died: April 11, 2003 (aged 75)
- Resting place: Wood National Cemetery; Milwaukee, Wisconsin
- Party: Democratic
- Spouse: Mary Bernadette
- Children: William Moser; Mary Magdalen
- Education: St. Norbert College (B.S.); Marquette University Law School (LL.B.)

Military service
- Allegiance: United States
- Branch/service: United States Army
- Years of service: 1945–1947

William Robert Moser (October 14, 1927 – April 11, 2003) was an American lawyer and judge, he was Judge of the Wisconsin Court of Appeals for 13 years. Earlier, he was a Wisconsin Circuit Court judge in Milwaukee County, and represented Milwaukee County in the Wisconsin State Senate as a Democrat.

== Background ==
Moser was born October 14, 1927, in Chicago. He was educated in Milwaukee parochial schools (St. Michael's Elementary and St. John's Cathedral High School. From 1945-1947 he served in the United States Army as a paratrooper and a criminal investigator; then earned his Bachelor of Science degree at St. Norbert College, and LL.B. from Marquette University Law School, and went into practice as an attorney. He became a member of the Advisory Council to Mayor of Milwaukee Frank P. Zeidler, and a director or active member of various civic, veterans and fraternal organizations.

== Legislative office ==
In 1956 he was elected to the 6th Senatorial District (the 7th, 10th, & 13th Wards of the City of Milwaukee) to succeed fellow Democrat William A. Schmidt, who was not running for re-election. Moser obtained a plurality in a four-way Democratic primary election against State Representative Cecil B. Brown Jr., former State Representative John Schaller, and Brown Deer village trustee Fred W. Voigt; and was unopposed in the general election. He served as the floor leader for Senate Democrats in the 1960 session, and was elected a Kennedy delegate to the 1960 Democratic National Convention. He easily turned aside challenges from Schaller in the 1960 primary, and from Republican Delbert Fowler in the general election; and served again as the Democratic floor leader in the 1961 session, leading the fight against the adoption of a sales tax in Wisconsin; but resigned effective Feb. 1, 1962 to become a Milwaukee County judge. He was succeeded by fellow Democrat Martin J. Schreiber.

== Judiciary ==
In 1971, he was elected without opposition as a Wisconsin Circuit Court judge. He was re-elected in 1977, and in April 1978 was elected to the newly created Court of Appeals District 1. In 1980, he fended off a re-election challenge from Christ T. Seraphim, winning by 195,256 to 137,262. He was unopposed in 1986, and became Presiding Judge of the District 1 Court of Appeals. He did not run for re-election in 1992, and was succeeded on the Court by Charles B. Schudson.

== Death ==
Moser died April 11, 2003, leaving behind a wife, Mary Bernadette, a son, William, and a daughter, Mary Magdalen.

Legal offices
Preceded by New branch	Wisconsin Circuit Court Judge for the 2nd Circuit, Branch 16; 1967 – 1978	Succeeded by Branch abolished
Preceded by New court	Judge of the Wisconsin Court of Appeals District I 1978 – 1992	Succeeded by Charles B. Schudson
