= 2007 Wisconsin Supreme Court election =

- April 3, 2007
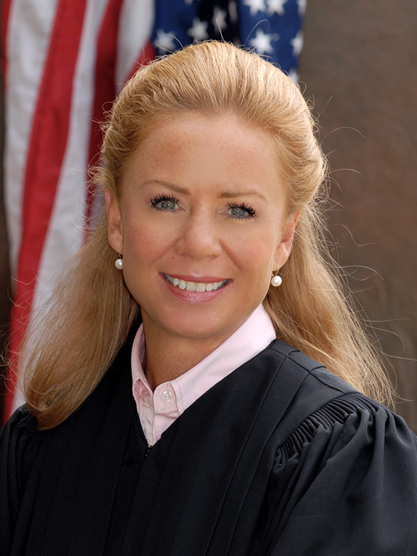

Candidate	Annette Ziegler	Linda M. Clifford
Popular vote	487,422	342,371
Percentage	58.61%	41.17%
- Ziegler: 50–60% 60–70% 70–80% Clifford: 50–60% 60–70%
Justice before election
Jon P. Wilcox
Elected Justice
Annette Ziegler

The 2007 Wisconsin Supreme Court election was held on April 3, 2007, to elect a justice to the Wisconsin Supreme Court for a ten-year term. Washington County circuit court judge Annette Ziegler defeated Madison attorney Linda M. Clifford. As more than two candidates filed to run, a nonpartisan election was held on February 20, 2007 in which attorney Joseph Sommers was eliminated. Incumbent justice Jon P. Wilcox did not seek re-election.

== Primary election ==
=== Candidates ===
==== Advanced ====
- Linda M. Clifford, attorney
- Annette Ziegler, judge of the Washington County Circuit Court (Branch 2)

==== Eliminated in primary ====
- Joseph Sommers, attorney

==== Declined ====
- Jon P. Wilcox, incumbent justice

=== Primary results ===
Results by county: Ziegler: Ziegler—30–40%; Ziegler—40–50%; Ziegler—50–60%; Ziegler—60–70%; Ziegler—70–80%; Ziegler—80–90%; Clifford: Clifford—40–50%

== General election ==
=== Campaign ===
A major focus of the campaign was the ideological lean of the candidates. Zeigler was described as being ideologically conservative, while Clifford was described as being ideologically liberal. The outgoing judge, Jon P. Wilcox, was an ideological conservative. At the time of the election, the court was considered to have a "liberal majority" ideological composition, with 3 liberal justices, 3 conservative justices, and 1 centrist justice.

=== Results ===
Since Ziegler's victory meant the seat remained held by a conservative, no shift occurred to the court's ideological lean.

2007 Wisconsin Supreme Court election
Party	Candidate	Votes	%
Primary Election (February 20, 2007)
Nonpartisan	Annette Ziegler	164,916	57.04
Nonpartisan	Linda M. Clifford	78,501	27.15
Nonpartisan	Joseph Sommers	44,835	15.51
	Scattering	860	0.30
Total votes			100
General election (April 3, 2007)
Nonpartisan	Annette Ziegler	487,422	58.61
Nonpartisan	Linda M. Clifford	342,371	41.17
	Scattering	1,864	0.22
Total votes		831,657	100
