= Gregory Gill =

American judge

Judge of the Wisconsin Court of Appeals for the 3rd district
- Incumbent
- Assumed office August 1, 2021
- Preceded by: Mark Seidl

Judge of the Outagamie County Circuit Court Branch 4
- In office September 2011 – July 31, 2021
- Appointed by: Scott Walker
- Preceded by: Harold Vernon Froehlich
- Succeeded by: Yadira Rein

Personal details
- Born: February 26, 1975 (age 51)
- Spouse: Jill (m. 2006)
- Children: 3
- Education: University of Wisconsin, Madison (BA); Marquette University (JD)

Gregory B. Gill Jr. (born February 26, 1975) is an American attorney and judge. He has been a Wisconsin circuit court judge in Outagamie County, since 2011, but was elected in April 2021 to the Wisconsin Court of Appeals, with a term set to begin August 1, 2021.

== Biography ==
Gill earned his bachelor's degree from University of Wisconsin–Madison, and went on to obtain his J.D. from Marquette University Law School. He began his legal career as an assistant district attorney in Outagamie County, Wisconsin, and went on to clerk for Judge William C. Griesbach of the United States District Court for the Eastern District of Wisconsin. He then joined his family's law firm, known as Gill & Gill, focused on labor and employment law.

In 2011, Gill was appointed Wisconsin circuit court judge for Outagamie County's Branch 4 court, by Wisconsin Governor Scott Walker. He went on to win election to a full term in 2012 and was re-elected in 2018, both times without facing an opponent.

In December 2020, following the announcement that Judge Mark Seidl would retire at the end of his term, Judge Gill announced his candidacy for Wisconsin Court of Appeals in the northern District III court. In the April general election, Gill defeated his opponent, Rick Cveykus, with 55% of the vote.
