= William A. Schmidt =

American politician (1902–1992)

William A. Schmidt (May 21, 1902 – June 19, 1992) was an American welder and shop foreman who served two terms as a Democratic member of the Wisconsin State Senate from the Sixth District (the 2nd, 7th, 10th, 20th & 25th Wards of the City of Milwaukee, Wisconsin).

== Background ==
Schmidt was born in Princeton, Wisconsin. He was Roman Catholic. He received his early education at parochial school in Montello, Wisconsin and the Montello High School. He attended Marquette University for one year. He was a welder who became a maintenance foreman for A. O. Smith. Schmidt was active in his labor union, serving as chairman of the bargaining and coordinating committees of his local. He was a member of the Knights of Columbus, Fraternal Order of Eagles, Holy Name Society of St. Michael's Church, Badger Fisherman's League, and Montello Rod and Gun Club.

== Career ==
In the 1948 Democratic primary election for the Sixth Senate District, Schmidt (a former Wisconsin Progressive) won the nomination by 22 votes from incumbent Edward Reuther, and went on to win the general election in a four-way race against Republican Assemblyman Paul Jaeger, as well as a Socialist and a Wallace "People's Progressive" candidate. During the 1951 session, he served as assistant floor leader for the Democrats. He was re-elected in 1952; unopposed in his primary, he again defeated Republican Jaeger, whom he had faced in 1948.

Schmidt would remain a member of the Senate through 1956, but did not run for re-election, but instead ran for Lieutenant Governor of Wisconsin; Schmidt and gubernatorial running mate William Proxmire lost in the general election. (The man who beat Schmidt for Lieutenant Governor, Warren P. Knowles, would eventually become governor himself). Schmidt was succeeded in the Senate by fellow Democrat William R. Moser.

Party political offices
Preceded by Edwin J. Larkin	Democratic nominee for Lieutenant Governor of Wisconsin; 1956	Succeeded by Philleo Nash
