= Laura Crivello =

21st century American judge

The Honorable Laura Crivello

Wisconsin Circuit Court Judge for the Milwaukee Circuit, Branch 36
- Incumbent
- Assumed office August 1, 2018
- Appointed by: Scott Walker
- Preceded by: Jeffrey Kremers

Personal details
- Spouse: Frank
- Education: University of Wisconsin–Milwaukee
- Profession: Lawyer, judge

Laura A. Crivello is an American lawyer and judge. She has served as a Wisconsin circuit court judge in Milwaukee County since 2018.

== Life and career ==
Crivello graduated from the University of Wisconsin–Milwaukee before receiving her Juris Doctor from the Marquette University Law School in 1993. For twenty-four years, she worked as a prosecutor, focusing on prosecutions related to drugs and gang violence. In her last years at the Milwaukee County District Attorney’s office, she was team leader for the office High Intensity of Drug Trafficking Area (HIDTA) team. In 2017, the Wisconsin Law Journal named her a recipient of its “Women of the Law” award. In 2018, an inmate was accused of trying to order a hit on her after she helped send him to prison.

In 2018, Crivello was appointed as the Wisconsin circuit court judge in Milwaukee County by then-Governor Scott Walker, a Republican. She kept her seat when she ran uncontested in 2019.

Legal offices
Preceded by Jeffrey Kremers	Wisconsin Circuit Court Judge for the Milwaukee Circuit, Branch 36; August 1, 2018 – present	Incumbent
