= Jeffrey Kremers =

American judge (born 1951)

The Honorable Jeffrey A. Kremers

Chief Judge of the 1st District of Wisconsin Circuit Courts
- In office September 2008 – July 31, 2015
- Preceded by: Kitty Brennan
- Succeeded by: Maxine Aldridge White

Wisconsin Circuit Court Judge for the Milwaukee Circuit, Branch 36
- In office August 1, 1992 – July 31, 2018
- Appointed by: Tommy Thompson
- Preceded by: Joseph P. Callan
- Succeeded by: Laura Crivello

Personal details
- Spouse: Ann Ranfranz

Jeffrey A. Kremers (born 1951) is an American attorney and judge. He served 26 years as a Wisconsin circuit court judge in Milwaukee County, and was chief judge for Wisconsin's 1st judicial administrative district from 2008 until 2015.

== Life and career ==
Kremers was born to John Kremers and Nelva Jean (Bowers) Nowers. He graduated from the University of Wisconsin Law School in 1975. He worked in private practice from 1975 to 1976. Between 1976 and 1981, he worked as an assistant district attorney in Milwaukee before returning to private practice.

In 1992, Kremers was appointed to the Wisconsin Circuit Court in Milwaukee County by then-Governor Tommy Thompson, a Republican. He was elected in 1993 and re-elected in 1999, 2005, and 2011. In 2005, Kremers was appointed as a deputy chief judge of the court. In 2008, the Wisconsin Supreme Court appointed Kremers as the court's chief judge.

In 2013, Kremers was named Judge of the Year by the State Bar of Wisconsin. He was named the State Bar's Lifetime Jurist Achievement Award in 2018.

Kremers retired in July 2018.

Legal offices
Preceded by Joseph P. Callan	Wisconsin Circuit Court Judge for the Milwaukee Circuit, Branch 36; 1992 – 2018	Succeeded by Laura Crivello
Preceded by Kitty Brennan	Chief Judge of the 1st District of Wisconsin Circuit Courts; 2008 – 2015	Succeeded by Maxine Aldridge White
