= Mark Seidl =

American judge

The Honorable Mark A. Seidl

Judge of the Wisconsin Court of Appeals District III
- In office August 1, 2015 – July 31, 2021
- Preceded by: Michael W. Hoover
- Succeeded by: Gregory Gill

Personal details
- Born: November 19, 1946 (age 79) Fort Atkinson, Wisconsin, U.S.
- Spouse: Judi Goodman
- Children: 3
- Education: University of Wisconsin–Eau Claire (B.S.); University of Wisconsin Law School (J.D.)

Mark A. Seidl (born November 19, 1946) is an American lawyer and jurist. He served as a judge of the Wisconsin Court of Appeals for a six-year term (2015–2021) in the court's Wausau-based District III. He did not seek a second term in 2021.

== Life and career ==
Seidl was born in Fort Atkinson, Wisconsin and raised in the northern Wisconsin communities of Stanley and Medford. His father, Peter Seidl, served as a circuit court judge in Taylor County from 1962 until 1980. The younger Seidl graduated from the University of Wisconsin-Eau Claire in 1968 and worked as a high school and college instructor until 1971, when he entered the University of Wisconsin Law School. Seidl received his J.D. degree in 1974 and entered private practice in Wausau. Seidl worked as a general practice attorney for more than 40 years, handling civil, family, real estate, and probate matters.

In 2015, Seidl contested a seat on District III of the Wisconsin Court of Appeals vacated by the retirement of Judge Michael W. Hoover. He faced Eau Claire County circuit judge Kristina Bourget, who was appointed to the bench by Governor Scott Walker in 2013. Seidl defeated Bourget in the April general election and assumed office in August.

Legal offices
Preceded by Michael W. Hoover	Judge of the Wisconsin Court of Appeals District III; August 1, 2015 – July 31, 2021	Succeeded by Gregory Gill
