= 1989 Wisconsin Supreme Court election =

- April 4, 1989

Candidate	Shirley Abrahamson	Ralph Adam Fine
Popular vote	485,169	397,378
Percentage	54.97%	45.03%
- Abrahamson: 50–60% 60–70% 70–80% Fine: 50–60% 60–70%
Justice before election
Shirley Abrahamson
Elected Justice
Shirley Abrahamson

The 1989 Wisconsin Supreme Court election was held on April 4, 1989, to elect a justice to the Wisconsin Supreme Court for a ten-year term. Incumbent justice Shirley Abrahamson was re-elected over Ralph Adam Fine.

The campaign was described to be a "heated race".

== Candidates ==
- Shirley Abrahamson: incumbent justice
- Ralph Adam Fine, Wisconsin Circuit Court judge for the Brown County circuit

== Results ==
1989 Wisconsin Supreme Court election
Party	Candidate	Votes	%
General Election, April 4, 1989
Nonpartisan	Shirley Abrahamson (incumbent)	485,169	54.97
Nonpartisan	Ralph Adam Fine	397,378	45.03
Plurality		87,791	9.95
Total votes		882,547	100
