= 2005 Wisconsin Supreme Court election =

- April 5, 2005
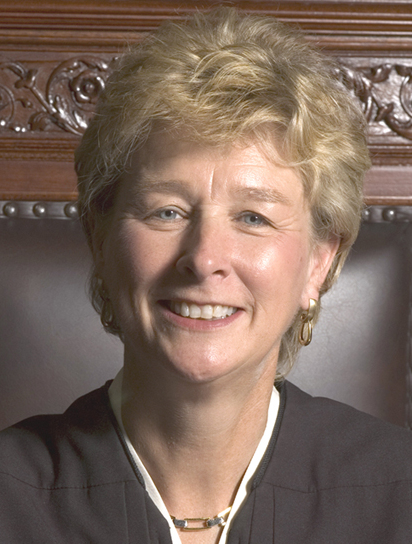
Candidate	Ann Walsh Bradley
Popular vote	550,478
Percentage	99.58%
- County results Bradley: >90%
Justice before election
Ann Walsh Bradley
Elected Justice
Ann Walsh Bradley

The 2005 Wisconsin Supreme Court election was held on April 5, 2005 to elect a justice to the Wisconsin Supreme Court for a ten-year term. Incumbent justice Ann Walsh Bradley was re-elected unopposed.

== Result ==
2005 Wisconsin Supreme Court election
Party	Candidate	Votes	%	±%
General election (April 5, 2005)
Nonpartisan	Ann Walsh Bradley (incumbent)	550,478	99.58	
	Scattering	2,312	0.42	
Total votes		552,790	100	
