= Michael W. Hoover =

American judge (born 1951)

Judge of the Wisconsin Court of Appeals for the 3rd district
- In office August 1, 1997 – July 31, 2015
- Preceded by: Daniel L. LaRocque
- Succeeded by: Mark Seidl

Personal details
- Born: December 21, 1951 (age 74) Milwaukee, Wisconsin, U.S.
- Education: University of Wisconsin–Madison (B.A.); University of Wisconsin Law School (J.D.)
- Profession: Lawyer

Michael W. Hoover (born December 21, 1951) is an American lawyer and retired jurist from Wausau, Wisconsin. He was a judge of the Wisconsin Court of Appeals for 18 years in the Wausau-based 3rd district, serving from 1997 to 2015.

== Life and career ==
Hoover was born in Milwaukee, Wisconsin, and was raised in the neighboring city of Wauwatosa. Hoover graduated with honors from the University of Wisconsin–Madison in 1974 and cum laude from the University of Wisconsin Law School in 1978. He is a member of the Order of the Coif. From 1978 until 1980, he served as an assistant district attorney in Marathon County; from 1980 to 1988, he worked in private practice and as an assistant city attorney in Wausau. In 1988, Hoover was elected to the Marathon County Circuit Court.

In 1997, Hoover contested a vacant seat on District III of the Wisconsin Court of Appeals, chambered in Wausau. In the April general election, he defeated Port Wing attorney and future Court of Appeals judge Gary Sherman. Hoover served as presiding judge of District III from 1999 until his retirement in 2015, and served as the court's deputy chief judge from 2012. Judge Mark Seidl was elected to replace Hoover in April 2015.

Legal offices
Preceded by Daniel L. LaRocque	Judge of the Wisconsin Court of Appeals for the 3rd district August 1, 1997 – July 31, 2015	Succeeded by Mark Seidl
