= 2006 Wisconsin Supreme Court election =

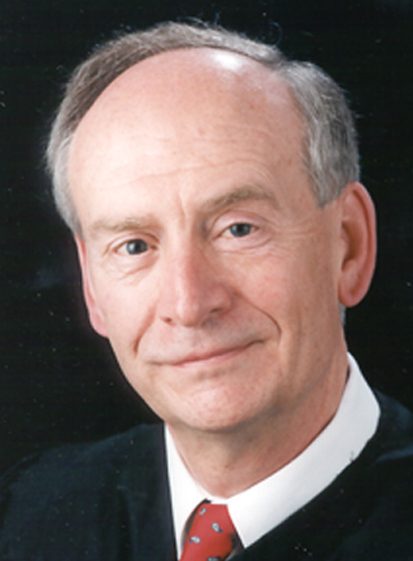
Candidate	N. Patrick Crooks
Popular vote	499,636
Percentage	99.39%
- County results Crooks: >90%
Justice before election
N. Patrick Crooks
Elected Justice
N. Patrick Crooks

The 2006 Wisconsin Supreme Court election was held on April 4, 2006, to elect a justice to the Wisconsin Supreme Court for a ten-year term. Incumbent justice N. Patrick Crooks was re-elected unopposed.

== Results ==
2006 Wisconsin Supreme Court election
Party	Candidate	Votes	%	±%
General election (April 4, 2006)
Nonpartisan	N. Patrick Crooks (incumbent)	499,636	99.39%	
	Scattering	3,052	0.61%	
Total votes		502,688	100.0%	-9.06%
