= Annette Ziegler =

American judge (born 1964)

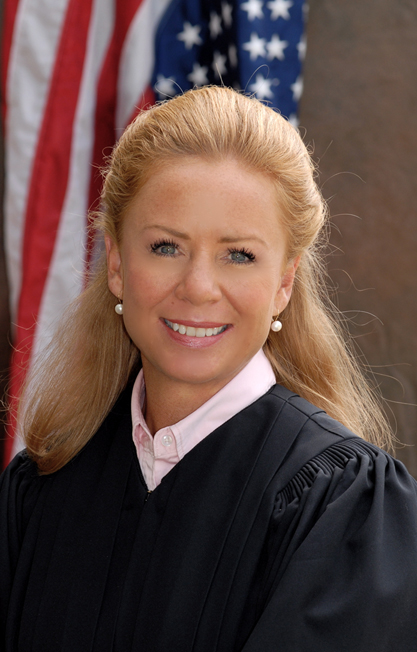
- 2007 portrait

27th Chief Justice of the Wisconsin Supreme Court
- In office May 1, 2021 – April 30, 2025
- Preceded by: Patience D. Roggensack
- Succeeded by: Ann Walsh Bradley

Justice of the Wisconsin Supreme Court
- Incumbent
- Assumed office August 1, 2007
- Preceded by: Jon P. Wilcox

Judge of the Washington County Circuit Court Branch 2
- In office August 1, 1997 – July 31, 2007
- Appointed by: Tommy Thompson
- Preceded by: James Schwalbach
- Succeeded by: James Muehlbauer

Personal details
- Born: Annette Marie Kingsland; March 6, 1964 (age 62) Grand Rapids, Michigan, U.S.
- Spouse: J. J. Ziegler
- Children: 3
- Education: Hope College (BA); Marquette University (JD)

Annette Kingsland Ziegler (born March 6, 1964) is an American lawyer and jurist serving since 2007 as a justice of the Wisconsin Supreme Court. From 2021 to 2025 she served as the Court's 27th chief justice. Regarded as a member of the court's conservative wing, Ziegler has announced that she will retire on July 31, 2027, at the end of her current term. Before her election to the Court, she served ten years as a Wisconsin circuit court judge in Washington County. Earlier in her career, she served as an Assistant United States attorney in the United States District Court for the Eastern District of Wisconsin.

== Early life and education ==
Ziegler was born in Grand Rapids, Michigan, to Joyce and Rex R. Kingsland, and graduated from Grand Rapids's Forest Hills Central High School in 1982. She received a bachelor's degree in business administration and psychology from Hope College in 1986, and a Juris Doctor from Marquette University Law School in 1989. While in law school she was a staff editor of the Marquette Law Review, as well as a recipient of the Dean's Award.

== Early career ==
After graduating from law school, Ziegler was admitted to the State Bar of Wisconsin in 1989. Before serving in the judiciary, she worked as a federal prosecutor, an assistant U.S. attorney for the Eastern District of Wisconsin. She was also a pro bono special assistant district attorney in the Milwaukee County District Attorney's Office. In private practice, she was a civil private practice attorney for several years at the law firm of O'Neil, Cannon, Hollman & DeJong, SC.

== Wisconsin circuit court ==
In 1997, Governor Tommy Thompson appointed Ziegler to the Washington County Circuit Court, in the Branch 2 vacancy created by the death of Judge James B. Schwalbach. She was elected to a full term in April 1998 and reelected in 2004, both times unopposed. She then ran for the Supreme Court seat being vacated by retiring Justice Jon P. Wilcox.

== Wisconsin Supreme Court ==
=== 2007 election ===
Ziegler faced Madison attorney Linda Clifford in the April 2007 general election, after they were the top two finishers in the February primary. The campaign was contentious. Ziegler asserted that Clifford's lack of judicial experience made her ill-prepared for the Supreme Court; she also raised concerns about two of Clifford's campaign workers misrepresenting themselves to law enforcement officials. Clifford asserted that Ziegler had ruled in cases where she had a clear conflict of interest.

It came to light during the campaign that Ziegler had ruled on roughly a dozen cases affecting a bank of which her husband was a paid board member, and on 22 cases involving companies in which Ziegler personally owned more than $50,000 of stock.

On April 3, 2007, Ziegler defeated Clifford in the election, 58% to 42%. Her campaign and allies outspent Clifford $4.1 million to $1.7 million. The influential business lobbying associations Wisconsin Manufacturers & Commerce and Wisconsin Club for Growth spent $2.6 million in support of Ziegler.

Following her election, in a 5–1 decision the Wisconsin Supreme Court took the unprecedented step of publicly reprimanding Ziegler for willful violations of the code of judicial conduct by presiding over those cases where she had an apparent conflict of interest.

=== Tenure ===
In 2015, Ziegler joined the four-justice majority that ended the John Doe investigation into possibly illegal coordination between the 2010 gubernatorial campaign of Scott Walker and Wisconsin Manufacturers & Commerce and Wisconsin Club for Growth. The court ruled that such coordination, if it had occurred, would be legal. The sweeping ruling upended Wisconsin campaign finance rules, enabling close coordination between campaigns and political action committees, which do not have to disclose their donors.

In 2017, she joined a 5–2 decision to strike down a rule that would have required judges to recuse from cases where they had received lawful campaign contributions from one of the interested parties.

Ziegler was reelected in 2017 without opposition. Her second term expires on July 31, 2027.

In 2021, Chief Justice Patience Roggensack, then 80 years old, declined to seek another two-year term as chief justice. On April 14, 2021, Ziegler's colleagues elected her as the next chief justice of the Wisconsin Supreme Court, effective May 1, 2021. Ziegler is the second chief justice to be elected by her colleagues since the constitution was amended to establish this selection process.

Zeigler is generally regarded as part of the court's conservative wing.

Since the swearing-in of Janet Protasiewicz in 2023 and the emergence of a liberal majority on the Court, Ziegler has come into frequent conflict with her more liberal colleagues, whom she accuses of judicial activism and staging a "coup". This criticism was the main focus of her vehement dissent in Clarke v. Wisconsin Elections Commission, in which she wrote that the majority (often referred to in the dissent as the "court of four") "takes a wrecking ball to the law, making no room, nor having any need, for longstanding practices, procedures, traditions, the law, or even their co-equal fellow branches of government. Their activism damages the judiciary as a whole." Her criticism has been noted for its extensive reliance on ad hominem attacks, with little substantive reasoning to justify her dissents.

=== Retirement ===
On March 9, 2026, Ziegler announced that she would not run for reelection in 2027 and would leave office at the end of her present term.

== Electoral history ==
=== Wisconsin Circuit Court (1998, 2004) ===
Wisconsin Circuit Court, Washington Circuit, Branch 2 Election, 1998
| Party | Candidate | Votes | % | ±% |
|---|---|---|---|---|
| Nonpartisan | Annette K. Ziegler (incumbent) | 6,364 | 100.0% | |
| Total votes | | 6,364 | 100.0% | |

Wisconsin Circuit Court, Washington Circuit, Branch 2 Election, 2004
| Party | Candidate | Votes | % | ±% |
|---|---|---|---|---|
| Nonpartisan | Annette K. Ziegler (incumbent) | 12,067 | 99.82% | |
| | Write-ins | 22 | 0.18% | |
| Total votes | | 12,089 | 100.0% | |

=== Wisconsin Supreme Court (2007, 2017) ===
2007 Wisconsin Supreme Court election
| Party | Candidate | Votes | % | ±% |
|---|---|---|---|---|
Primary Election, February 20, 2007
| Nonpartisan | Annette K. Ziegler | 164,916 | 57.04% | |
| Nonpartisan | Linda M. Clifford | 78,501 | 27.15% | |
| Nonpartisan | Joseph Sommers | 44,835 | 15.51% | |
| | Scattering | 860 | 0.30% | |
| Total votes | | 506,517 | 100.0% | |
General Election, April 3, 2007
| Nonpartisan | Annette K. Ziegler | 487,422 | 58.61% | |
| Nonpartisan | Linda M. Clifford | 342,371 | 41.17% | |
| | Scattering | 1,864 | 0.22% | |
| Total votes | | 831,657 | 100.0% | |

2017 Wisconsin Supreme Court election
| Party | Candidate | Votes | % | ±% |
|---|---|---|---|---|
General Election, April 4, 2017
| Nonpartisan | Annette K. Ziegler (incumbent) | 492,352 | 97.20% | |
| | Scattering | 14,165 | 2.80% | |
| Total votes | | 506,517 | 100.0% | |

Legal offices
| Preceded by Jon P. Wilcox | Justice of the Wisconsin Supreme Court; 2007–present | Incumbent |
| Preceded by Patience D. Roggensack | Chief Justice of the Wisconsin Supreme Court; 2021–2025 | Succeeded by Ann Walsh Bradley |
