= Kitty Brennan =

American judge (born 1950)

The Honorable Kitty K. Brennan

Judge of the Wisconsin Court of Appeals District I
- In office August 21, 2008 – September 4, 2019
- Appointed by: Jim Doyle
- Preceded by: Ted E. Wedemeyer Jr.
- Succeeded by: Joe Donald

Chief Judge of the 1st District of Wisconsin Circuit Courts
- In office August 1, 2005 – August 21, 2008
- Preceded by: Michael P. Sullivan
- Succeeded by: Jeffrey Kremers

Wisconsin Circuit Court Judge for the Milwaukee Circuit, Branch 6
- In office August 1, 1994 – August 21, 2008
- Preceded by: George W. Greene Jr.
- Succeeded by: Ellen R. Brostrom

Personal details
- Born: May 17, 1950 (age 76) Milwaukee, Wisconsin
- Spouse: Joseph G. Murphy
- Children: Daniel George Murphy; Kathleen Brennan Murphy; 2 others
- Education: University of Wisconsin–Madison (B.S.); University of Wisconsin Law School (J.D.)

Kitty K. Brennan (born May 17, 1950) is an American lawyer and retired judge. She served on the Wisconsin Court of Appeals from 2008 to 2019 in the Milwaukee-based District I. Earlier in her career, she served 14 years as a Wisconsin Circuit Court Judge and worked as an assistant district attorney in Milwaukee County.

== Biography ==
Born in Milwaukee, Wisconsin, Brennan received her bachelor's degree from the University of Wisconsin–Madison and her J.D. degree from the University of Wisconsin Law School. She began her legal career as an assistant district attorney in the office of the Milwaukee County District Attorney. In 1984, she left the office to enter private practice with the firm Murphy & Brennan.

Brennan was elected to the Wisconsin Circuit Court in 1994, defeating George W. Greene in the spring election that year. Greene had been appointed to the role seven months before the election to replace Judge Robert W. Landry, who had retired. She was re-elected to the circuit court in 2000 and 2006. In 2005, she was appointed Chief Judge of the 1st Judicial Administrative District by the Wisconsin Supreme Court. She was re-appointed to a second two-year term as Chief Judge in 2007, but in 2008, Governor Jim Doyle appointed her to the Wisconsin Court of Appeals following the death of Judge Ted E. Wedemeyer, Jr. She was re-elected to the Court of Appeals without opposition in 2009 and 2015. She served as Presiding Judge for District I from 2016 to 2018.

Judge Brennan was named "Judge of the Year" in 2006 by the State Bar of Wisconsin. She retired in 2019 and was succeeded by Judge Joe Donald.

== Personal life and family ==
Judge Brennan is married to Joseph G. Murphy, and they have four children.

== Electoral history ==
=== Wisconsin Circuit Court (1994, 2000, 2006) ===
Wisconsin Circuit Court, Milwaukee Circuit, Branch 6 Election, 1994
Party	Candidate	Votes	%	±%
General Election, April 5, 1994
Nonpartisan	Kitty K. Brennan	46,176	60.43%	
Nonpartisan	George W. Greene (incumbent)	30,231	39.57%	
Total votes		76,407	100.0%	

=== Wisconsin Court of Appeals (2009, 2015) ===
Wisconsin Court of Appeals, District I Election, 2015
Party	Candidate	Votes	%	±%
General Election, April 7, 2015
Nonpartisan	Kitty K. Brennan	52,442	98.83%	
	Scattering	620	1.17%	
Total votes		53,062	100.0%	

Legal offices
Preceded by Robert W. Landry	Wisconsin Circuit Court Judge for the Milwaukee Circuit, Branch 6; 1994–2008	Succeeded by Ellen Brostrom
Preceded by Michael P. Sullivan	Chief Judge of the 1st District of Wisconsin Circuit Courts; 2005–2008	Succeeded by Jeffrey Kremers
Preceded by Ted E. Wedemeyer Jr.	Judge of the Wisconsin Court of Appeals District I 2008–2019	Succeeded by Joe Donald
