= Ralph Adam Fine =

American judge (1941–2014)

Judge of the Wisconsin Court of Appeals District I
- In office August 1, 1988 – December 5, 2014
- Preceded by: Ted E. Wedemeyer Jr.
- Succeeded by: Rebecca Bradley

Wisconsin Circuit Judge for the Milwaukee Circuit, Branch 34
- In office August 1, 1979 – July 31, 1988
- Preceded by: Position established
- Succeeded by: Ted E. Wedemeyer Jr.

Personal details
- Born: February 14, 1941 New York, New York, U.S.
- Died: December 5, 2014 (aged 73) Milwaukee, Wisconsin, U.S.
- Parents: Sidney A. Fine (father); Libby Poresky (mother)
- Relatives: Burton M. Fine (brother)
- Education: Tufts University (BA); Columbia Law School (JD)
- Profession: Lawyer, author

Ralph Adam Fine (February 14, 1941 – December 5, 2014) was an American lawyer, judge, author, and television personality. He served as a judge on the Wisconsin Court of Appeals for the last 26 years of his life, after serving 9 years as a Wisconsin circuit court judge in Milwaukee County.

A former attorney for the United States Department of Justice, Fine gained public attention as an author and Milwaukee television host before seeking public office. Fine was known for his staunch opposition to plea bargaining, a position which helped secure his election to District I of the state Court of Appeals in 1988.

== Early life and education ==
Fine was born in New York City, the son of New York Supreme Court justice Sidney A. Fine and impressionist artist Libby Poresky.

Fine graduated from Tufts University in 1962 and received his Juris Doctor degree from Columbia Law School in 1965.

== Early career ==
Following his graduation from law school, Fine was a law clerk to Judge George Rosling of the United States District Court for the Eastern District of New York and worked for three years as an appellate attorney in the United States Justice Department Civil Division. After leaving the Justice Department, Fine relocated to Brown Deer, Wisconsin, and became a full-time writer, publishing a legal novel titled Mary Jane vs. Pennsylvania, a critique of the pharmaceutical industry, and several law journal articles.

In 1972, he contested the Democratic nomination for Wisconsin's 9th congressional district, but was defeated; he later worked for WITI, hosting a legal affairs program called A Fine Point. As host of A Fine Point, Fine interviewed Nobel Prize laureates Elie Wiesel and Milton Friedman.

== Judicial career ==
As a judge, Fine was regarded to be a conservative, including on matters of policing.

=== Circuit Court of Milwaukee County (1979–88) ===
In 1979, Fine was elected to the Circuit Court of Milwaukee County. During his campaign, he emphasized his opposition to plea bargaining.

While serving in the court's felony division in 1985, Fine presided over the trial and sentencing of Daniel McDonald, a Lafayette County judge who had murdered the law partner of an electoral rival.

In 1987, after he received a large volume of substitution demands from defense counsel, Fine was transferred to the circuit court's civil division.

=== Wisconsin Court of Appeals (1988–2014) ===
In 1988, Fine challenged Wisconsin Court of Appeals Judge Ted E. Wedemeyer Jr. for his seat on the court's Milwaukee-based District I. Touting his support of a stricter criminal justice system, Fine received the endorsement of The Milwaukee Sentinel and easily unseated Wedemeyer in the April general election.

In 1989, Fine unsuccessfully challenged Wisconsin Supreme Court Justice Shirley Abrahamson; he ran once more for the Supreme Court, again unsuccessfully, in 1996.

As an appellate judge, Fine participated in a number of notable cases. In 2007, he served on a disciplinary panel that recommended the censure of Wisconsin Supreme Court Justice Annette Ziegler, who, while a circuit court judge, had violated conflict of interest provisions in the state's judicial ethics code. In 2008, he served on a similar panel which reviewed potential campaign misconduct allegedly committed by Justice Michael Gableman; this panel recommended no discipline. In 2014, Fine dissented from a Court of Appeals ruling affirming the conviction of Kelly Rindfleisch, deputy chief of staff to Scott Walker when he served as Milwaukee County Executive.

== Death ==
Fine died on December 5, 2014, in Milwaukee after a brief illness.

== Select bibliography ==
- Mary Jane vs. Pennsylvania
- The Great Drug Deception: The Shocking Story of MER/29 and the Folks Who Gave You Thalidomide
- Fine's Wisconsin Evidence
- Escape of the Guilty
- The How-to-Win Trial Manual: Winning Trial Advocacy in a Nutshell (5th ed. 2011)

Legal offices
New circuit established	Wisconsin Circuit Judge for the Milwaukee Circuit, Branch 34; August 1, 1979 – July 31, 1988	Succeeded by Ted E. Wedemeyer Jr.
Preceded by Ted E. Wedemeyer Jr.	Judge of the Wisconsin Court of Appeals District I August 1, 1988 – December 5, 2014	Succeeded by Rebecca Bradley
