= Ted E. Wedemeyer Jr. =

American judge (1932–2008)

The Honorable Ted E. Wedemeyer Jr.

Judge of the Wisconsin Court of Appeals District I
- In office August 1, 1992 – July 23, 2008
- Preceded by: Position established
- Succeeded by: Kitty K. Brennan
- In office August 1, 1982 – July 31, 1988
- Preceded by: Rudolph T. Randa
- Succeeded by: Ralph Adam Fine

Wisconsin Circuit Court Judge for the Milwaukee Circuit, Branch 34
- In office August 1, 1988 – July 31, 1992
- Appointed by: Tommy Thompson
- Preceded by: Ralph Adam Fine
- Succeeded by: Jacqueline D. Schellinger

Wisconsin Circuit Court Judge for the Milwaukee Circuit, Branch 10
- In office August 1, 1978 – July 31, 1982
- Preceded by: Position established
- Succeeded by: Rudolph T. Randa

Wisconsin Circuit Court Judge for the 2nd Circuit, Branch 10
- In office August 1977 – July 31, 1978
- Appointed by: Martin J. Schreiber
- Preceded by: Harvey L. Neelen
- Succeeded by: Position abolished

Personal details
- Born: August 30, 1932 Milwaukee, Wisconsin, US
- Died: July 23, 2008 (aged 75) Milwaukee, Wisconsin, US
- Resting place: Holy Trinity Cemetery; Milwaukee, Wisconsin
- Spouses: Susan Wedemeyer; (died 2012)
- Parents: Theodore E. Wedemeyer (father); Catharine Wedemeyer (mother)
- Education: Marquette University Law School
- Profession: lawyer, judge

Ted E. Wedemeyer Jr. (August 30, 1932 – July 23, 2008) was an American lawyer and a judge of the Wisconsin Court of Appeals. Wedemeyer served twice on the court's Milwaukee-based District I; he was the district's presiding judge from 1983 to 1985 and from 1992 until 2007.

== Early life and career ==
Wedemeyer's father, Ted Sr., was an attorney and politician who served as a Milwaukee alderman, as a civil court judge, and as a Milwaukee County supervisor. Wedemeyer Jr. graduated from Marquette University Law School and worked as a private practice attorney in Milwaukee from 1957 to 1974. Wedemeyer was active in Democratic politics; he served on the executive board of the Milwaukee County Democratic Party and chaired Milwaukee Mayor Henry Maier's campaign committee. In the early 1970s, Wedemeyer was appointed by Maier to chair the Milwaukee Board of Zoning Appeals.

== Judicial career ==
In 1974, Wedemeyer assisted in the development and organization of the Milwaukee Municipal Court, a limited-jurisdiction court hearing city ordinance violations. In November 1974, Maier appointed Wedemeyer as one of the court's first two judges. He served as a municipal judge until 1977, when he was appointed to the Milwaukee County Circuit Court by Acting Governor Marty Schreiber. In 1982, he challenged Wisconsin Court of Appeals Judge Rudolph T. Randa for his seat on the court's Milwaukee-based District I. Wedemeyer unseated Randa in the April general election; from 1983 to 1985, he served as District I's presiding judge.

In the leadup to the 1988 Milwaukee mayoral election, Wedemeyer was suggested as a possible successor to the retiring Maier, but ultimately did not run. Instead, he was challenged for reelection to the Court of Appeals by Milwaukee County Circuit Judge Ralph Adam Fine, who touted his opposition to plea bargaining and defeated Wedemeyer after a contentious campaign. Governor Tommy Thompson, a Republican, appointed Wedemeyer to replace Fine on the circuit court.

In 1992, Wedemeyer was returned to the Court of Appeals; he was elected without opposition to a newly created seat in District I. He became the district's presiding judge in the same year, occupying that office until 2007. He sought election to the Wisconsin Supreme Court in 1995 and received support from the Milwaukee press, but failed to survive the February primary election.

Wedemeyer was noted for his involvement in community service activities. Active in promoting soccer in Wisconsin through the Milwaukee Kickers organization, he was inducted into the Wisconsin Soccer Association Hall of Fame in 1992.

== Death ==
Wedemeyer died of lung cancer, while still in office, on July 23, 2008.

== Electoral history ==
=== Wisconsin Circuit Court (1978) ===
Wisconsin Circuit Court, 2nd Circuit, Branch 10 Election, 1978
Party	Candidate	Votes	%	±%
General Election, April 4, 1978
Nonpartisan	Ted E. Wedemeyer Jr.	53,091	100.0%	
Total votes		'53,091'	'100.0%'	

=== Wisconsin Court of Appeals (1982, 1988, 1992) ===
Wisconsin Court of Appeals, District I Election, 1982
Party	Candidate	Votes	%	±%
General Election, April 6, 1982
Nonpartisan	Ted E. Wedemeyer Jr.	36,724	59.59%	
Nonpartisan	Rudolph T. Randa (incumbent)	24,903	40.41%	
Total votes		'61,627'	'100.0%'	

Wisconsin Court of Appeals, District I Election, 1988
Party	Candidate	Votes	%	±%
General Election, April 5, 1988
Nonpartisan	Ralph Adam Fine	187,375	62.04%	
Nonpartisan	Ted E. Wedemeyer Jr. (incumbent)	114,634	37.96%	−21.63%
Total votes		'302,009'	'100.0%'	+390.06%

Wisconsin Court of Appeals, District I Election, 1992
Party	Candidate	Votes	%	±%
General Election, April 7, 1992
Nonpartisan	Ted E. Wedemeyer Jr.	183,855	100.0%	
Total votes		'183,855'	'100.0%'	

=== Wisconsin Supreme Court (1995) ===
1995 Wisconsin Supreme Court election
Party	Candidate	Votes	%	±%
Primary Election, February 21, 1995
Nonpartisan	Ann Walsh Bradley	131,889	38.85%	
Nonpartisan	N. Patrick Crooks	88,913	26.19%	
Nonpartisan	Ted E. Wedemeyer Jr.	64,668	19.05%	
Nonpartisan	Patience D. Roggensack	41,303	12.16%	
Nonpartisan	William A. Pangman	12,753	3.76%	
Total votes		'339,526'	'100.0%'	
General Election, April 4, 1995
Nonpartisan	Ann Walsh Bradley	514,588	54.82%	
Nonpartisan	N. Patrick Crooks	424,110	45.18%	
Total votes		'938,698'	'100.0%'	

=== Wisconsin Court of Appeals (1997, 2003) ===
Wisconsin Court of Appeals, District I Election, 1997
Party	Candidate	Votes	%	±%
General Election, April 1, 1997
Nonpartisan	Ted E. Wedemeyer Jr. (incumbent)	72,254	100.0%	
Total votes		'72,254'	'100.0%'	-60.70%

Wisconsin Court of Appeals, District I Election, 2003
Party	Candidate	Votes	%	±%
General Election, April 1, 2003
Nonpartisan	Ted E. Wedemeyer Jr. (incumbent)	67,116	100.0%	
Total votes		'67,116'	'100.0%'	-7.11%

Legal offices
Preceded by Harvey L. Neelen	Wisconsin Circuit Court Judge for the 2nd Circuit, Branch 10; 1977 – 1978	Succeeded by Circuit abolished
Preceded by New circuit	Wisconsin Circuit Court Judge for the Milwaukee Circuit, Branch 10; 1978 – 1982	Succeeded by Rudolph T. Randa
Preceded by Ralph Adam Fine	Wisconsin Circuit Court Judge for the Milwaukee Circuit, Branch 34; 1988 – 1992	Succeeded by Jacqueline D. Schellinger
Preceded by Rudolph T. Randa	Judge of the Wisconsin Court of Appeals District I 1982 – 1988	Succeeded by Ralph Adam Fine
Preceded by New seat	Judge of the Wisconsin Court of Appeals District I 1992 – 2008	Succeeded by Kitty K. Brennan
