= Ann Walsh Bradley =

American judge (born 1950)

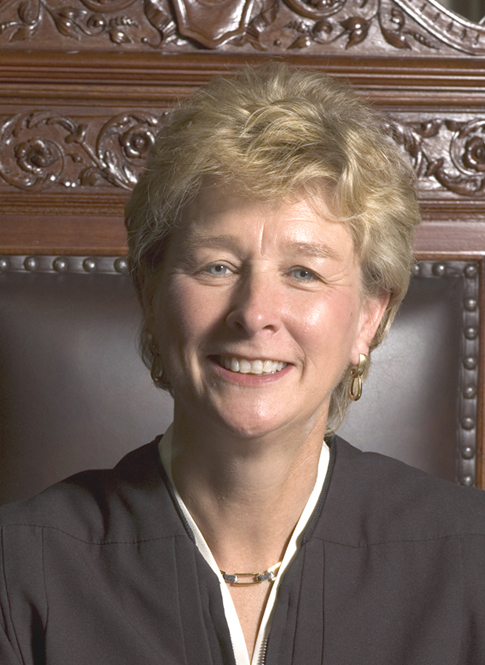
- 2004 portrait

28th Chief Justice of the Wisconsin Supreme Court
- In office May 1, 2025 – June 30, 2025
- Preceded by: Annette Ziegler
- Succeeded by: Jill Karofsky

Justice of the Wisconsin Supreme Court
- In office August 1, 1995 – July 31, 2025
- Preceded by: Nathan Heffernan
- Succeeded by: Susan M. Crawford

Personal details
- Born: Ann Ellen Walsh; July 5, 1950 (age 75) Richland Center, Wisconsin, U.S.
- Party: Democratic
- Spouse: Mark Bradley (m. 1978)
- Children: 4
- Relatives: John Bradley (father-in-law)
- Education: Webster University (BA); University of Wisconsin, Madison (JD)

Ann Walsh Bradley (née Ann Ellen Walsh; born July 5, 1950) is an American lawyer and jurist. She served as the 28th chief justice of the Wisconsin Supreme Court for two months in 2025, and was the fifth longest-serving justice in the history of the Wisconsin Supreme Court, serving 30 years. She was first elected in 1995 and was re-elected in 2005 and 2015. Before joining the Wisconsin Supreme Court, she served ten years as a Wisconsin circuit court judge in Marathon County, Wisconsin.

== Early life and career ==
Ann Walsh Bradley was born Ann Ellen Walsh in Richland Center, Wisconsin, in 1950. She graduated from Richland Center High School and went on to Webster University in St. Louis, Missouri. She worked three jobs to pay for college, and earned her bachelor's degree in 1972. While in school, she worked for the Democratic Party presidential primary campaign of New York mayor John Lindsay. She later said that this was her last involvement in partisan politics.

After graduating, she worked as a high school teacher at Aquinas High School in La Crosse, Wisconsin, before entering the University of Wisconsin Law School, where she earned her J.D. in 1976.

She moved to Wausau, Wisconsin, after completing her legal education and worked for three years as an attorney for Wausau Insurance Companies. In 1979, she went into private practice and associated with the law firm Bradley, Hoover, Grady, & Molinaro. She was appointed to the state Public Defender Board in 1983

In February 1985, Governor Tony Earl appointed her to a vacant Wisconsin circuit court judgeship in Marathon County. A year later, she won a full six-year term as judge, and was re-elected in 1992, without facing an opponent in either election.

== Wisconsin Supreme Court ==
In April 1994, Chief Justice Nathan Heffernan announced he would not stand for re-election in 1995, and would therefore retire from the court later that year when his term expired. This created the first open seat election for Wisconsin Supreme Court since 1983. Bradley announced her candidacy the next day. She had twice previously solicited appointment to the court, in 1992 and 1993, when two previous justices had resigned in the middle of their terms. Ultimately, three other notable Wisconsin lawyers and judges entered the 1995 race: Brown County circuit judge N. Patrick Crooks, Court of Appeals judge Ted E. Wedemeyer Jr., and Madison attorney Patience D. Roggensack. Bradley attempted to maintain political independence in the race, and criticized Crooks for emphasizing his endorsements from Republican governor Tommy Thompson's political organization. Bradley touted her own bipartisan endorsements, from Democratic former governor Tony Earl and Republican Sue Ann Thompson—the wife of Governor Tommy Thompson—who served as a co-chair of the Bradley campaign.

In the top-two nonpartisan primary, Bradley topped the field of five, receiving 38% of the vote. Crooks came in second with 26% and moved on to face Bradley in the April general election. Bradley continued to emphasize her independence from politics in the general election campaign, though by then she had also picked up the endorsement of prominent liberal judges in the state and the Wisconsin Education Association Council teachers' union group. Bradley received 54% of the general election vote; she was sworn in at the Wisconsin State Capitol on August 16, 1995.

She won re-election without opposition in 2005.

=== 2011 conflict with Justice Prosser ===
On June 13, 2011, Bradley had a confrontation with Justice David Prosser Jr. that allegedly became violent. Prosser, Bradley, and all other justices besides Patrick Crooks were in Bradley's office discussing the next day decision that would overturn Judge Sumi's ruling on the collective bargaining law. There are different accounts as to what occurred. According to Bradley, the discussion became heated after Bradley asked Prosser to leave her office and said she was bothered by his disparaging comments towards Chief Justice Shirley Abrahamson. She alleged he then put his hands around her throat in what was described as a choke hold. Prosser said that these reports would be proven to be false.

Bradley stated that Prosser had choked her: "The facts are that I was demanding that he get out of my office and he put his hands around my neck in anger in a chokehold." Prosser denied he choked Bradley, saying "Once there's a proper review of the matter and the facts surrounding it are made clear, the anonymous claims made to the media will be proven false." Neither Prosser nor Bradley faced criminal charges from the incident. The state Judicial Commission told its special prosecutor not to pursue new avenues to forward its ethics case against Prosser.

=== Later years and retirement ===
Scott Walker's administration was also dogged through its first term with a John Doe investigation into his campaign fundraising. Bradley chose to recuse herself from Supreme Court cases dealing with the Walker investigation, because her son, John Bradley, was a law partner with one of the lawyers in the case. Bradley said at the time, "This court has been subject to extensive criticism for its recusal rules and practices. Weak recusal rules and lapses in recusal practices undermine the public trust and confidence in a fair and impartial judiciary."

Bradley faced a contested election in 2015, but prevailed with nearly 60% of the vote over Rock County circuit judge James P. Daley.

The 2023 Wisconsin Supreme Court election gave liberals on the court a majority for the first time since 2008. On the night of the election, Bradley commented that she intended to run for a fourth term in 2025. A year later, however, Bradley announced that she would not seek re-election in 2025 and will retire when her current term expires on July 31, 2025. Shortly after announcing her retirement, Bradley endorsed Dane County circuit judge Susan M. Crawford to succeed her; Crawford went on to win the 2025 election, defeating former attorney general Brad Schimel.

Despite her retirement, Bradley was elected to a two-year term as the court's chief justice on April 3, with her term beginning May 1. She served just two months as chief justice, standing down on June 30 in favor of Justice Jill Karofsky. She retired on July 31, 2025, achieving the fifth longest tenure in the history of the Wisconsin Supreme Court.

== Personal life and family ==
Ann Walsh took the last name Bradley when she married Mark J. Bradley in 1978, at St. James Catholic Church in Wausau. Mark Bradley is also a prominent attorney in Wisconsin and was a member of the University of Wisconsin Board of Regents. Mark's father was John Bradley, commonly but erroneously known for being one of the servicemen depicted in the Raising the Flag on Iwo Jima. Mark and Ann have four adult children.

Bradley is an elected member of the American Law Institute, a former associate dean and faculty member of the Wisconsin Judicial College, a former chair of the Wisconsin Judicial Conference, a Democrat and a lecturer for the American Bar Association's Asia Law Initiative.

== Electoral history ==
=== Wisconsin Circuit Court (1986, 1992) ===
Wisconsin Circuit Court, Marathon Circuit, Branch 3 election, 1986
Party	Candidate	Votes	%	±%
General election, April 1, 1986
Nonpartisan	Ann Walsh Bradley (incumbent)	9,062	100.0%	
Total votes		9,062	100.0%	

Wisconsin Circuit Court, Marathon Circuit, Branch 3 election, 1992
Party	Candidate	Votes	%	±%
General election, April 7, 1992
Nonpartisan	Ann Walsh Bradley (incumbent)	22,694	100.0%	
Total votes		22,694	100.0%	

=== Wisconsin Supreme Court (1995–2015) ===
1995 Wisconsin Supreme Court election
Party	Candidate	Votes	%	±%
Nonpartisan primary, February 21, 1995 (top two)
Nonpartisan	Ann Walsh Bradley	131,889	38.85%	
Nonpartisan	N. Patrick Crooks	88,913	26.19%	
Nonpartisan	Ted E. Wedemeyer Jr.	64,668	19.05%	
Nonpartisan	Patience D. Roggensack	41,303	12.16%	
Nonpartisan	William A. Pangman	12,753	3.76%	
Total votes		339,526	100.0%	
General election, April 4, 1995
Nonpartisan	Ann Walsh Bradley	514,588	54.82%	
Nonpartisan	N. Patrick Crooks	424,110	45.18%	
Total votes		938,698	100.0%	

2005 Wisconsin Supreme Court election
Party	Candidate	Votes	%	±%
General election, April 5, 2005
Nonpartisan	Ann Walsh Bradley (incumbent)	550,478	99.58%	
	Scattering	2,312	0.42%	
Total votes		552,790	100.0%	

2015 Wisconsin Supreme Court election
Party	Candidate	Votes	%	±%
General election, April 7, 2015
Nonpartisan	Ann Walsh Bradley (incumbent)	471,866	58.03%	
Nonpartisan	James P. Daley	340,632	41.89%	
	Scattering	702	0.09%	
Total votes		813,200	100.0%	

Legal offices
Preceded by Nathan Heffernan	Justice of the Wisconsin Supreme Court; 1995–2025	Succeeded by Susan M. Crawford
Preceded by Annette Ziegler	Chief Justice of the Wisconsin Supreme Court; 2025	Succeeded by Jill Karofsky
