= 2013 Wisconsin elections =

State elections in Wisconsin, United States

- April 2, 2013

The 2013 Wisconsin Spring Election was held in the U.S. state of Wisconsin on April 2, 2013. There were contested elections for justice of the Wisconsin Supreme Court and Superintendent of Public Instruction, as well as several other nonpartisan local and judicial elections. In addition, the ballot contained a special election to fill a vacancy in the 98th Assembly district. The 2013 Wisconsin Spring Primary was held February 19, 2013.

In the top two races, both parties claimed one victory. For Wisconsin Supreme Court, the Republicans' preferred candidate, incumbent Patience Roggensack, was reelected. For Superintendent, the Democrats' preferred candidate, incumbent Tony Evers, was also reelected.

Later in the year, there were three more special elections, for the 21st, 69th, and 82nd Assembly districts.

== State elections ==
=== Executive ===
==== Superintendent of Public Instruction ====
2013 Wisconsin Superintendent of Public Instruction election
- April 2, 2013
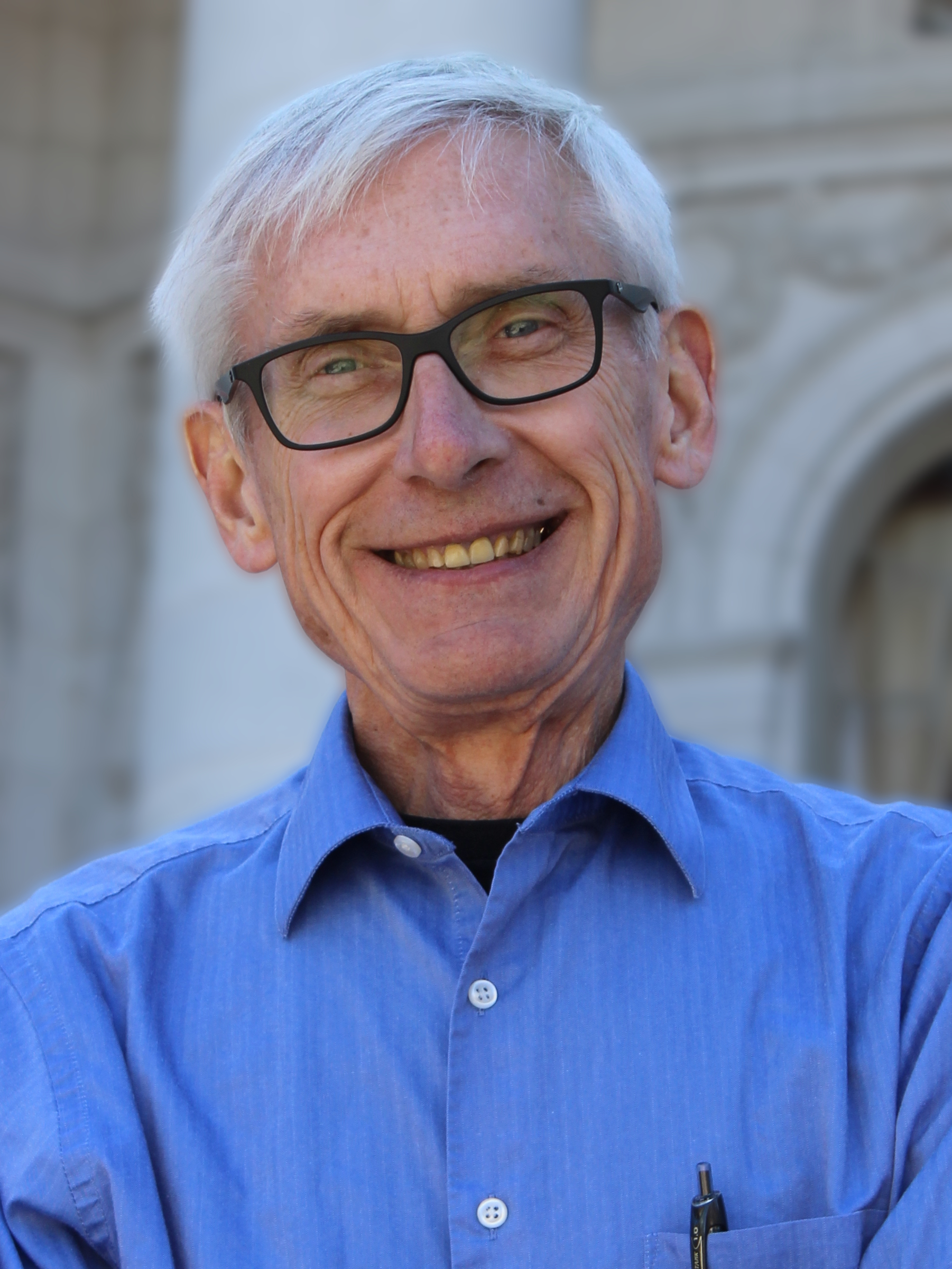

Nominee	Tony Evers	Don Pridemore
Popular vote	487,030	308,050
Percentage	61.15%	38.67%
- County results Evers: 50–60% 60–70% 70–80% Pridemore: 50–60% 60–70%
Superintendent before election
Tony Evers
Nonpartisan
Elected Superintendent
Tony Evers
Nonpartisan

A regularly scheduled election for Superintendent of Public Instruction of Wisconsin was held at the Spring general election, April 2, 2013. Incumbent superintendent Tony Evers, first elected in 2009, won his second four-year term, defeating state representative Don Pridemore with 61% of the vote.

Wisconsin Superintendent of Public Instruction Election, 2013
Party	Candidate	Votes	%	±%
General Election, April 2, 2013
Nonpartisan	Tony Evers (incumbent)	487,030	61.15%	+4.01%
Nonpartisan	Don Pridemore	308,050	38.67%	
	Scattering	1,431	0.18%	+0.06%
Plurality		178,980	22.47%	
Total votes		796,511	100.0%	+3.62%

=== Legislative ===
==== State Assembly 98th district special election ====
A special election was held concurrently with the regularly scheduled Spring election to fill the 98th district seat of the Wisconsin State Assembly. The seat was vacated by Republican Paul Farrow, who had been elected to the Wisconsin Senate in the 2012 general election. At the time of the special election, the 98th district was located in central Waukesha County, containing the city and village of Pewaukee, the village of Sussex, and the north side of the city of Waukesha. It was considered a safe Republican district.

No Democrat registered to run for this seat in the special election. In the Spring primary, Republican Adam Neylon defeated Ed Baumann, Jeanne Tarantino, Matt Morzy, and Todd A. Greenwald, receiving 38.35% of the vote. He went on to win the special election without a formal opponent on the ballot.

==== State Assembly 21st district special election ====
A special election was held November 19, 2013, to fill the 21st district seat of the Wisconsin State Assembly. The seat was vacated by Republican Mark Honadel, who resigned for a private sector job. At the time of the special election, the 21st Assembly district was located in southeast Milwaukee County, including the cities of Oak Creek and South Milwaukee, and a small part of the city of Franklin. It was considered a moderately competitive Republican seat.

In the October 22 Republican primary, Jessie Rodriguez defeated Chris Kujawa, Ken Gehl, Larry Gamble, and Jason Red Arnold, receiving 48% of the vote. She went on to defeat Democrat Elizabeth Coppola in the special election, receiving 56% of the vote.

==== State Assembly 69th district special election ====
A special election was held November 19, 2013, to fill the 69th district seat of the Wisconsin State Assembly. The seat was vacated by Republican Scott Suder, who resigned to accept a role at the Wisconsin Public Service Commission, though he ended up taking a lobbying job rather than the Public Service Commission appointment. At the time of the special election, the 69th Assembly district comprised the eastern half of Clark County, along with parts of southwest Marathon County and northwest Wood County, including most of the city of Marshfield. It was considered a safe Republican seat.

In the October 22 Republican primary, Bob Kulp defeated Alanna Feddick, Tommy Dahlen, and Scott Kenneth Noble, receiving 44% of the vote. He went on to defeat Democrat Kenneth A. Slezak and independent Tim Swiggum in the special election, receiving 67% of the vote.

==== State Assembly 82nd district special election ====
A special election was held December 18, 2013, to fill the 82nd district seat of the Wisconsin State Assembly. The seat was vacated by Republican Jeff Stone, who resigned to accept a role at the Wisconsin Public Service Commission. At the time of the special election, the 82nd Assembly district was located in southwest Milwaukee County, comprising the village of Greendale, along with most of the city of Franklin and part of the city of Greenfield. It was considered a likely Republican seat.

In the November 19 Republican primary, Ken Skowronski defeated Stephanie Mares, Shari Hanneman, and Steven C. Becker, receiving 50% of the vote. He went on to defeat Democrat John R. Hermes in the special election, receiving 64% of the vote.

=== Judicial ===
==== State Supreme Court ====
2013 Wisconsin Supreme Court election
- April 2, 2013
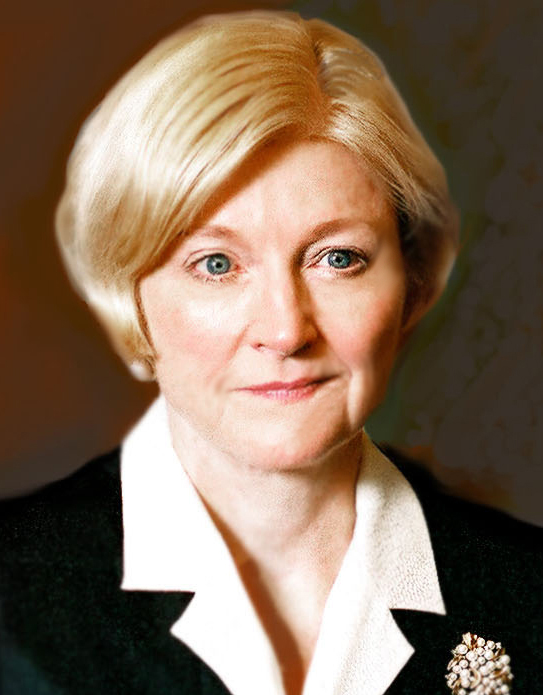

Candidate	Patience Roggensack	Edward Fallone
Popular vote	491,261	362,969
Percentage	57.48%	42.47%
- County results Roggensack: 50–60% 60–70% 70–80% Fallone: 50–60% 60–70%
Justice before election
Patience Roggensack
Elected Justice
Patience Roggensack

A regularly scheduled Wisconsin Supreme Court election was held at the spring general election, April 2, 2013. Incumbent justice Patience Roggensack, first elected in 2003, won her second ten-year term, defeating attorney Edward Fallone with 57% of the vote. Attorney Vince Megna was eliminated in the February primary.

Wisconsin Supreme Court Election, 2013
Party	Candidate	Votes	%	±%
Nonpartisan Primary, February 19, 2013
Nonpartisan	Patience Roggensack (incumbent)	231,822	63.74%	+24.38pp
Nonpartisan	Edward Fallone	108,490	29.83%	
Nonpartisan	Vince Megna	22,391	6.16%	
	Write-ins	972	0.27%	
Total votes		363,675	100.0%	+30.73%
General Election, April 2, 2013
Nonpartisan	Patience Roggensack (incumbent)	491,261	57.48%	+6.35pp
Nonpartisan	Edward Fallone	362,969	42.47%	
	Write-ins	485	0.06%	−0.09pp
Plurality		128,292	15.01%	+12.61pp
Total votes		854,715	100.0%	+6.73%

==== State Court of Appeals ====
Three seats on the Wisconsin Court of Appeals were up for election in 2013. None were contested.

- In District II, Judge Mark Gundrum, appointed by Governor Scott Walker in 2011, won a full six-year term without opposition.
- In District III, Judge Gregory A. Peterson did not run for re-election and resigned before the election. Eau Claire County circuit court judge Lisa K. Stark was elected to a six-year term without opposition.
- In district IV, Judge Paul Lundsten, appointed by Governor Tommy Thompson in 2000, won his third six-year term without opposition.

==== State Circuit Courts ====
Twenty nine of the state's 249 circuit court seats were up for election in 2013. Eight of those seats were contested, five incumbent judges faced a contested election and three were defeated.

- In Dane County, attorney Rhonda L. Lanford defeated incumbent circuit judge Rebecca St. John.
- In Dodge County, court commissioner Joseph Sciasca defeated attorney Joseph Fischer for the seat being vacated by Judge Andrew Bissonnette.
- In Lincoln County, attorney Robert Russell defeated incumbent circuit judge John Yackel.
- In Manitowoc County, incumbent district attorney Mark R. Rohrer narrowly defeated attorney Steven R. Olson for the seat recently vacated by Judge Patrick Willis.
- In Marinette County, incumbent judge James A. Morrison defeated a challenge from incumbent district attorney Allen R. Brey.
- In Marquette County, attorney Bernard Ben Bult narrowly defeated attorney Donna Cacic Wissbaum for the seat being vacated by Judge Richard O. Wright.
- In Milwaukee County, Branch 45, incumbent judge Rebecca Bradley defeated assistant district attorney Janet Protasiewicz. The two would later serve together on the Wisconsin Supreme Court.
- In Ozaukee County, attorney Joe Voiland defeated incumbent circuit judge Tom Wolfgram. Wolfgram was damaged because he had signed the petition to recall Governor Scott Walker.

Circuit	Branch	Incumbent	Elected			Defeated			Defeated in Primary
Circuit	Branch	Incumbent	Name	Votes	%	Name	Votes	%	Name(s)
Brown	3	Tammy Jo Hock	Tammy Jo Hock	20,819	99.56%				
Brown	7	Timothy A. Hinkfuss	Timothy A. Hinkfuss	21,858	99.50%				
Columbia	3	Alan J. White	Alan J. White	8,123	99.42%				
Dane	16	Rebecca St. John	Rhonda L. Lanford	42,976	52.31%	Rebecca St. John	39,080	47.56%	
Dodge	2	John R. Storck	John R. Storck	10,312	99.68%				
Dodge	3	Andrew P. Bissonnette	Joseph G. Sciascia	7,568	59.14%	Joseph F. Fischer	5,215	40.75%	Dawn N. Klockow
Jefferson	2	William F. Hue	William F. Hue	9,410	99.37%				
La Crosse	1	Ramona A. Gonzalez	Ramona A. Gonzalez	12,020	99.13%				
La Crosse	2	Elliott Levine	Elliott Levine	11,875	99.71%				
La Crosse	3	Todd Bjerke	Todd Bjerke	12,053	99.69%				
La Crosse	4	Scott L. Horne	Scott L. Horne	12,507	99.68%				
Lincoln	2	John M. Yackel	Robert R. Russell	3,087	51.42%	John M. Yackel	2,914	48.53%	
Manitowoc	1	--Vacant--	Mark R. Rohrer	8,153	50.01%	Steven R. Olson	8,129	49.87%	Steven J. Weber; Bob Dewane
Marathon	4	Gregory Grau	Gregory Grau	14,166	99.60%				
Marinette	2	James A. Morrison	James A. Morrison	4,175	56.66%	Allen R. Brey	3,192	43.32%	
Marquette		Richard O. Wright	Bernard Ben Bult	1,645	51.45%	Donna Cacic Wissbaum	1,549	48.45%	
Milwaukee	11	Dominic S. Amato	David C. Swanson	59,989	98.25%				
Milwaukee	26	William Pocan	William Pocan	60,343	98.40%				
Milwaukee	45	Rebecca Bradley	Rebecca Bradley	55,177	53.00%	Janet Protasiewicz	48,685	46.77%	Gil Urfer
Monroe	1	Todd L. Ziegler	Todd L. Ziegler	5,630	99.54%				
Ozaukee	2	Tom R. Wolfgram	Joe Voiland	13,009	62.72%	Tom R. Wolfgram	7,729	37.26%	
Portage	2	John V. Finn	John V. Finn	8,032	99.52%				
Racine	1	Gerald P. Ptacek	Gerald P. Ptacek	20,771	99.67%				
Rock	4	Daniel T. Dillon	Daniel T. Dillon	13,284	99.42%				
St. Croix	2	Edward F. Vlack III	Edward F. Vlack III	7,976	99.03%				
Sheboygan	2	Timothy M. Van Akkeren	Timothy M. Van Akkeren	16,271	99.32%				
Trempealeau		John A. Damon	John A. Damon	4,246	99.65%				
Waukesha	1	Michael O. Bohren	Michael O. Bohren	48,258	99.73%				
Waukesha	9	Donald J. Hassin Jr.	Donald J. Hassin Jr.	47,855	99.71%				

== Local elections ==
=== Dane County ===
==== Dane County executive ====
- A regularly scheduled county executive election was held in Dane County, Wisconsin, concurrent with the Spring general election, April 2, 2013. Incumbent Democrat Joe Parisi, who was first elected in a 2011 special election, was elected to a full four-year term without opposition.

=== La Crosse County ===
==== La Crosse Common Council President ====
- A recall election was held in La Crosse, Wisconsin on January 31, 2013. Incumbent Audrey Kader survived an attempted recall after getting 74% of the vote in the primary.
