= 2013 Wisconsin Supreme Court election =

- April 2, 2013
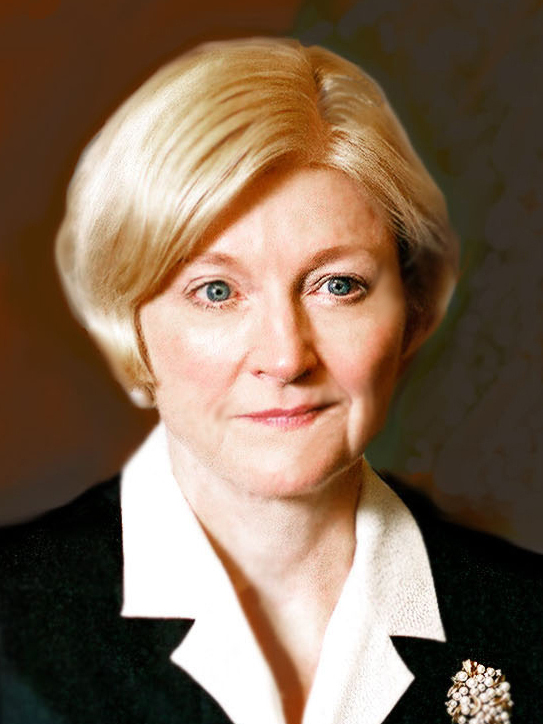

Candidate	Patience Roggensack	Edward Fallone
Popular vote	491,261	362,969
Percentage	57.48%	42.47%
- County results Roggensack: 50–60% 60–70% 70–80% Fallone: 50–60% 60–70%
Justice before election
Patience Roggensack
Elected Justice
Patience Roggensack

The 2013 Wisconsin Supreme Court election was held on April 2, 2013, to elect a justice of the Wisconsin Supreme Court for a ten-year term. Incumbent justice Patience Roggensack, first elected in 2003, won her second ten-year term, defeating attorney Edward Fallone with 57% of the vote.

As more than two candidates filed to run in this election, a nonpartisan primary was held on February 19, 2013. In the primary, attorney Vince Megna was eliminated.

== Background ==
Heading into the election, the court had a conservative ideological majority (4 conservatives, 2 liberals, and 1 centrist). Roggensack was a conservative, and Fallone was a liberal. Megna described himself as being a "committed liberal" and a member of the Democratic Party (although judicial elections are nonpartisan).

== Candidates ==
- Patience Roggensack, incumbent justice
- Edward Fallone
- Vince Megna

== Results ==
With the re-election of Roggensack, the court retained its conservative ideological majority.

2013 Wisconsin Supreme Court Election
Party	Candidate	Votes	%	±%
Nonpartisan Primary, February 19, 2013
Nonpartisan	Patience Roggensack (incumbent)	231,822	63.74	+24.38pp
Nonpartisan	Edward Fallone	108,490	29.83	
Nonpartisan	Vince Megna	22,391	6.16	
	Write-ins	972	0.27	
Total votes		363,675	100.0	+30.73
General Election, April 2, 2013
Nonpartisan	Patience Roggensack (incumbent)	491,261	57.48	+6.35pp
Nonpartisan	Edward Fallone	362,969	42.47	
	Write-ins	485	0.06	−0.09pp
Plurality		128,292	15.01	+12.61pp
Total votes		854,715	100.0	+6.73

== See also ==
- 2013 Wisconsin elections
