= Nathan Petrashek =

American judge (born c.1984)

Nathan A. Petrashek

Judge of the Wisconsin Court of Appeals District I
- Incumbent
- Assumed office April 4, 2026
- Appointed by: Tony Evers
- Preceded by: Maxine A. White

Personal details
- Born: c.1984 Two Rivers, Wisconsin, U.S.
- Education: University of Wisconsin–Green Bay (BS); Marquette University Law School (JD)
- Profession: Attorney, jurist, legal scholar

Nathan A. Petrashek (born c.1984) is an American jurist and legal scholar serving as a judge of the Wisconsin Court of Appeals in the Milwaukee-based District I. He was appointed to the bench by Governor Tony Evers in 2026, succeeding retiring Chief Judge Maxine Aldridge White. Before his appointment, Petrashek worked within the Wisconsin state appellate system for 16 years as a central staff attorney and judicial law clerk.

== Early life and education ==
Petrashek was raised in Two Rivers, Wisconsin. He was a first-generation college student, attending the University of Wisconsin–Green Bay, where he graduated with a Bachelor of Science degree in Public Administration and political science in 2006. He earned his Juris Doctor from Marquette University Law School in 2009.

== Legal and academic career ==
Following his admission to the Wisconsin bar, Petrashek spent over a decade as a career law clerk within the Wisconsin Court of Appeals from 2009 to 2021. During this time, he clerked for judges Edward R. Brunner, Mark Mangerson, and Thomas Hruz. In 2021, he rose to become a central staff attorney for the court system, a role where he advised multi-judge panels on complex legal questions, jurisdiction, appellate procedures, and motion resolutions.

In addition to his service in the courts, Petrashek joined the faculty at Marquette University Law School in 2024 as an adjunct professor of law, focusing on appellate writing and advocacy. He also serves on the board of directors for the State Bar of Wisconsin's Appellate Practice Section and was a member of the State Bar's Continuing Legal Education Committee from 2023 to 2026.

=== Legal scholarship ===
Petrashek is a co-author of Standards of Appellate Review in Wisconsin, alongside Judge Thomas Hruz. The legal text was released as a standalone reference title by the State Bar of Wisconsin in 2025 and serves as an authority on standard-of-review doctrines across state civil and criminal appeals.

== Judicial service ==
On February 27, 2026, Governor Tony Evers announced that he would appoint Petrashek to the Wisconsin Court of Appeals, in the District I seat being vacated by the retirement of Chief Judge Maxine Aldridge White. Wisconsin Appeals District I serves Milwaukee County. Petrashek officially took the oath of office on April 4, 2026. Upon his appointment, his selection was publicly endorsed by appellate leaders including the new chief judge M. Joseph Donald. Petrashek's initial appointed term is slated to run through July 31, 2027; he announced in June 2026 that he would run for a full term on the court in the 2027 election.

== Personal life ==
Petrashek resides in Glendale, Wisconsin, with his wife and son. He has also actively volunteered as a community election inspector.

== See also ==
- Wisconsin Court of Appeals

Legal offices
Preceded by Maxine A. White	Judge of the Wisconsin Court of Appeals District I April 4, 2026 – present	Incumbent
