= Thomas H. Barland =

American politician and judge (born 1930)

The Honorable Thomas H. Barland

Wisconsin Circuit Court Judge for the Eau Claire Circuit, Branch 1
- In office August 1, 1978 – July 31, 2000
- Preceded by: Transitioned from 23rd Circ.
- Succeeded by: Lisa K. Stark

Wisconsin Circuit Court Judge for the 23rd Circuit
- In office January 1, 1976 – July 31, 1978
- Preceded by: Merrill R. Farr
- Succeeded by: Transitioned to Eau Claire Circ.

County Judge of Eau Claire County, Branch 1
- In office March 15, 1967 – December 31, 1975
- Appointed by: Warren P. Knowles
- Preceded by: Connor T. Hansen
- Succeeded by: William D. O'Brien

Member of the Wisconsin State Assembly from the Eau Claire 1st district
- In office January 1, 1961 – January 1, 1967
- Preceded by: Karl J. Goethel
- Succeeded by: Wilmer R. Waters

Personal details
- Born: March 3, 1930 (age 96) San Francisco, California, US
- Party: Republican
- Spouses: Ann Marie Johnson (m. 1964; died 1999); Jill Broderick
- Education: University of Wisconsin (B.A.); University of Wisconsin Law School (LL.B.)
- Profession: lawyer, judge

Military service
- Allegiance: United States
- Branch/service: United States Army; U.S. Army Reserve
- Years of service: 1953–1955 (USA); 1955–1965 (USAR)
- Rank: Captain
- Unit: Military Police

Thomas H. Barland (born March 3, 1930) is a retired American lawyer, politician, and judge. Most recently, he was the last chairman of the Wisconsin Government Accountability Board before its dissolution in 2015. He was a Wisconsin Circuit Court Judge and County Judge for 33 years in Eau Claire County and served six years in the Wisconsin State Assembly as a Republican.

== Early life and career ==
Although descended from one of the pioneer settlers of Eau Claire, Wisconsin, Barland was born in San Francisco, California, and received his early education on the island of Oahu in what was then the Territory of Hawaii. Barland's father was employed as an engineer for the War Department at the Schofield Barracks. At age 11, Barland witnessed the Attack on Pearl Harbor, racing home after the first wave of the attack and sheltering in his basement with his parents. A few months later, they were evacuated to the United States and relocated to Eau Claire.

He graduated from Eau Claire High School in 1947 and attended the University of Wisconsin–Madison, where he received his bachelor's degree in economics in 1951. He went on to law school at the University of Wisconsin Law School, but interrupted his education in 1953 to enlist in the United States Army.

He served two years as a Military Police Confinement Officer of the Post Stockade and Assistant Post Provost Marshal before transitioning to the United States Army Reserve as a Captain. He returned to law school in 1955 and completed his education in 1956. During his time in law school, he was a member of the editorial board of the Wisconsin Law Review, a member of the Phi Delta Phi legal fraternity and the Order of the Coif legal honor society. He was admitted to the State Bar of Wisconsin in June 1956 and worked briefly as an associate in the Eau Claire law firm Ramsdell, King, & Carroll, before being admitted as a partner in that firm on January 1, 1957, thereafter known as Ramsdell, King, Carroll, & Barland.

== Political career ==
During his early career, Barland became extremely active with Eau Claire civic organizations: He was a major fundraiser for the local chapter of the American Red Cross, becoming chairman of the chapter; he was active with the Junior Chamber of Commerce, receiving a distinguished service award in 1959; he was chairman of the Eau Claire Downtown Modernization Steering Committee, vice president of the local Family Service Association, vice president of the Eau Claire County Taxpayers Association, vice president of the Foreign Film Society, and a member of the Civic Music Association.

Barland declared his candidacy for Wisconsin State Assembly in June 1960, and was unopposed in seeking the Republican nomination. He challenged incumbent Democrat Karl J. Goethel in Eau Claire County's 1st assembly district—composed of most of the city of Eau Claire. In his announcement, Barland pledged to work to improve Wisconsin's industrial climate, streamline government, reform the tax laws, and secure funding for improved facilities for people suffering mental illness. Barland prevailed in the November election, winning by a mere 615 votes. He would go on to win re-election in 1962 and 1964, but did not run for a fourth term in 1966, leaving office in January 1967.

During his years in the Legislature, he was chosen as Republican Caucus Chairman and served on the Assembly committees on the judiciary, state affairs, and taxation; he served on the powerful Joint Finance Committee, and was vice chairman of the Legislative Council Taxation Committee. He also served on the Board on Government Operations, which was charged with managing emergency appropriations, and given oversight power over the state Department of Administration.

=== Kellett Commission ===
In 1965, new governor Warren P. Knowles asked the legislature to create a temporary commission to recommend a streamlining of the state's Administrative branch. Barland was appointed to the resulting Temporary Commission on Administrative Branch Reorganization (known as the "Kellett Commission" for its chairman, businessman William Kellett). The commission report, delivered to the Legislature in 1967, proposed a dramatic reorganization of the state government, combining several agencies, boards, and commissions, into 26 departments. The plan was extremely controversial, but, after compromise in the legislature, most of the recommendations were adopted.

== Judicial career ==
In March 1967, Governor Knowles appointed Barland County Judge of Eau Claire County, to replace Judge Connor T. Hansen, who he had earlier appointed to the Wisconsin Supreme Court. Judge Barland was subsequently elected to a full judicial term in 1968 and re-elected without opposition in 1976.

In 1975, he chose to run for the Wisconsin Circuit Court seat being vacated by retiring judge Merrill R. Farr, covering Eau Claire and Trempealeau counties—under the pre-1978 circuit court organization, this was the 23rd circuit. He was ultimately unopposed in the election and assumed office in January 1976. In 1977, however, Wisconsin voters approved a series of referendums enabling the 1978 Court Reorganization Act, which flattened the circuit and county court systems into a single trial court system. On August 1, 1978, Judge Barland transitioned from the 23rd circuit—which ceased to exist—to the new Eau Claire circuit. He went on to be re-elected as circuit court judge in 1981, 1987 and 1993. He retired in 2000 after 33 years on the bench following the death of his first wife, Ann, in 1999. He continued to hear cases as a reserve judge and arbitrator.

In addition to his reserve judge duties, Barland remained active in community groups after his retirement. He served on the executive committee of the Restorative Justice System, was president of TRY Mediations, and served on the boards of the United Way of Greater Eau Claire and the Big Brothers Big Sisters of the Chippewa Valley.

== Government Accountability Board ==
In 2009, Governor Jim Doyle appointed Judge Barland to the Wisconsin Government Accountability Board for a term to expire May 1, 2015. His appointment to the Board was confirmed by the State Senate in 2010. He became chairperson of the board in 2011.

In 2015, Wisconsin Republicans chose to abolish the Government Accountability Board as part of a broader effort to rein in independent oversight institutions within the state. Judge Barland referred to the action as, "a great step backwards," and said the board had been victim of "a political lynching."

== Personal life and history ==
Barland's great-grandfather, Reverend Thomas Barland, was a Scottish American immigrant and the first preacher to conduct a regular Protestant church service at Eau Claire after settling there in 1849.

Judge Barland married his first wife, Ann Marie Johnson, in 1964. Together, they were founding donors to create the Eau Claire Community Foundation. Ann died in 1999. Judge Barland is now married to Jill Broderick and has two adult step-children. Thomas and Jill Barland also maintain a donor fund at the Eau Claire Community Foundation and have been actively involved in the management of the organization.

Barland is the recipient of the "Outstanding Achievement Award" from the Children's Legacy Luncheon.

== Electoral history ==
=== Wisconsin Assembly (1960, 1962, 1964) ===
Wisconsin Assembly, Eau Claire 1st District Election, 1960
Party	Candidate	Votes	%	±%
General Election, November 8, 1960
Republican	Thomas H. Barland	6,188	52.61%	+3.85%
Democratic	Karl J. Goethel (incumbent)	5,573	47.39%	
Plurality		615	5.23%	+2.75%
Total votes		11,761	100.0%	+29.01%
Republican gain from Democratic		Swing	7.71%	

Wisconsin Assembly, Eau Claire 1st District Election, 1962
Party	Candidate	Votes	%	±%
General Election, November 6, 1962
Republican	Thomas H. Barland (incumbent)	5,019	56.82%	+4.21%
Democratic	Anton J. Miller	3,814	43.18%	
Plurality		1,205	13.64%	+8.41%
Total votes		8,833	100.0%	-24.90%
Republican hold				

Wisconsin Assembly, Eau Claire 1st District Election, 1964
Party	Candidate	Votes	%	±%
General Election, November 6, 1962
Republican	Thomas H. Barland (incumbent)	7,066	55.54%	−1.28%
Democratic	Edward R. Kaiser	5,657	44.46%	
Plurality		1,409	11.07%	-2.57%
Total votes		12,723	100.0%	+44.04%
Republican hold				

Wisconsin State Assembly
Preceded by Karl J. Goethel	Member of the Wisconsin State Assembly from the Eau Claire 1st district January 1, 1961 – January 1, 1967	Succeeded by Wilmer R. Waters
Legal offices
Preceded by Connor T. Hansen	County Judge for Eau Claire County, Branch 1 March 15, 1967 – December 31, 1975	Succeeded by William D. O'Brien
Preceded by Merrill R. Farr	Wisconsin Circuit Court Judge for the 23rd Circuit; January 1, 1976 – July 31, 1978	Circuit abolished
New circuit	Wisconsin Circuit Court Judge for the Eau Claire Circuit, Branch 1 August 1, 1978 – July 31, 2000	Succeeded by Lisa K. Stark
