= 2027 Wisconsin elections =

- April 6, 2027

The 2027 Wisconsin Spring Election is scheduled to be held in the U.S. state of Wisconsin on April 6, 2027. The featured race at the top of the ticket will be an open seat on the Wisconsin Supreme Court. Several other nonpartisan local and judicial offices will also be on the April 6 ballot, including a special election for county executive in Wisconsin's most populous county, Milwaukee, and mayoral elections in some of Wisconsin's larger cities—Green Bay, Madison, and Racine. The 2027 Wisconsin Spring Primary will be held February 16, 2027. The filing deadline for these elections is January 1, 2027.

== State offices ==
=== Judicial ===
==== State Supreme Court ====
A regularly scheduled Wisconsin Supreme Court election will be held on April 6, 2027. The incumbent judge, Annette Ziegler, has announced she will not run for re-election, retiring after 20 years on the court.

==== State Court of Appeals ====
All four districts of the Wisconsin Court of Appeals will have a seat up for election on April 6, 2027.

- In District I, Nathan Petrashek, appointed in 2026, is running for a full term.
- In District II, Shelley Grogan has not indicated if she will run for re-election.
- In District III, Gregory Gill has not indicated if he will run for re-election.
- In District IV, Todd Ziegler was appointed to the Wisconsin Court of Appeals after judge Chris Taylor joined the Wisconsin Supreme Court.

==== State Circuit Courts ====
At least 59 of the state's 261 circuit court seats will be on the ballot for the general election on April 6, 2027.

Circuit	Branch	Incumbent		Notes
Circuit	Branch	Name	Entered office	Notes
Adams	1	Daniel Glen Wood	2015	
Bayfield		John P. Anderson	2004	Appointed by Jim Doyle
Brown	1	Donald R. Zuidmulder	1997	
Brown	5	Marc A. Hammer	2008	Appointed by Jim Doyle
Calumet	2	Carey John Reed	2021	
Chippewa	2	James Isaacson	2009	
Columbia	1	Todd J. Hepler	2015	
Dane	6	Nia Trammell	2020	Appointed by Tony Evers
Dane	7	Mario D. White	2020	Appointed by Tony Evers
Dane	9	Jacob B. Frost	2020	Appointed by Tony Evers
Dane	13	Julie Genovese	2009	
Dane	17	David D. Conway	2020	Appointed by Tony Evers
Fond du Lac	3	Andrew J. Christenson	2021	
Douglas	1	Kelly J. Thimm	2009	
Douglas	2	George L. Glonek	2002	Appointed by Scott McCallum
Dunn	2	Christina Mayer	2021	
Dunn	3	Luke M. Wagner	2021	
Grant	2	Craig R. Day	2009	
Green	1	Faun Marie Phillipson	2021	
Jackson	1	Anna L. Becker	2014	Appointed by Scott Walker
Jackson	2	Daniel Diehn	2021	
Kenosha	1	Gerad Dougvillo	2021	
Kenosha	4	David Hughes	2026	Appointed by Tony Evers
Kenosha	5	David P. Wilk	2014	Appointed by Scott Walker
Kenosha	6	Angelina Gabriele	2021	
Kenosha	8	Chad G. Kerkman	2009	
La Crosse	5	Gloria L. Doyle	2015	
Langlade		John Rhode	2015	
Marathon	1	Suzanne C. O'Neill	2020	Appointed by Tony Evers
Marathon	6	Scott M. Corbett	2021	
Menominee–Shawano	1	Katherine Sloma	2020	Appointed by Tony Evers
Milwaukee	1	Jack Dávila	2020	Appointed by Tony Evers
Milwaukee	3	Katie Kegel	2021	
Milwaukee	12	David L. Borowski	2003	
Milwaukee	15	Jonathan D. Watts	2009	
Milwaukee	19	Kori L. Ashley	2020	Appointed by Tony Evers
Milwaukee	22	Timothy M. Witkowiak	2002	Appointed by Scott McCallum
Milwaukee	30	Jonathan D. Richards	2020	Appointed by Tony Evers
Milwaukee	31	Owen Piotrowski	2026	Appointed by Tony Evers
Milwaukee	37	T. Christopher Dee	2014	Appointed by Scott Walker
Milwaukee	38	Tanner Kilander	2026	Appointed by Tony Evers
Milwaukee	42	Reyna Morales	2020	Appointed by Tony Evers
Outagamie	1	Whitney Healy	2025	Appointed by Tony Evers
Outagamie	6	Vincent Biskupic	2014	Appointed by Scott Walker
Ozaukee	3	Sandy A. Williams	2007	Appointed by Jim Doyle after election
Racine	6	David W. Paulson	2015	
Racine	8	Faye M. Flancher	2002	Appointed by Scott McCallum
Rock	5	Mike Haakenson	2015	
Sawyer	1	John M. Yackel	2015	
Sheboygan	1	Samantha Bastil	2021	
Sheboygan	4	Rebecca Persick	2015	
Taylor		Ann Knox-Bauer	2008	Appointed by Jim Doyle
Walworth	3	Kristine E. Drettwan	2014	Appointed by Scott Walker
Walworth	4	Samuel Berg	2026	Appointed by Tony Evers
Washington	4	Sandra J. Giernoth	2020	Appointed by Tony Evers
Waukesha	8	Michael P. Maxwell	2015	
Waukesha	9	Michael Aprahamian	2014	Appointed by Scott Walker
Waukesha	10	Paul Bugenhagen Jr.	2015	
Waupaca	3	Diane Meulemans	2026	Appointed by Tony Evers

== Local offices ==
=== Brown County ===
==== Green Bay mayor ====
A regularly scheduled mayoral election will be held in Green Bay, Wisconsin, concurrent with the Spring general election, April 6, 2027. Incumbent mayor Eric Genrich is not seeking re-election. Former mayor Jim Schmitt announced a campaign for the office.

=== Dane County ===
==== Madison mayor ====
A regularly scheduled mayoral election will be held in Madison, Wisconsin, concurrent with the Spring general election, April 6, 2027. Incumbent mayor Satya Rhodes-Conway is not seeking re-election. Two candidates, former aldermen Brian Benford and Syed Abbas, have announced campaigns for mayor.

=== Milwaukee County ===
==== Milwaukee County executive ====
There will be a special election for Milwaukee County executive in 2027, likely to be held concurrent with the Spring general election, April 6, 2027, due to the pending resignation of incumbent executive David Crowley, who was elected governor. The winner of the special election will be entitled to serve the remainder of the term expiring April 2028. County board chair Marcelia Nicholson-Bovell, who is set to hold the office on an interim basis, has already indicated that she will run in the special election to fill the remainder of the term.

=== Racine County ===
==== Racine mayor ====
A regularly scheduled mayoral election will be held in Racine, Wisconsin, concurrent with the Spring general election, April 6, 2027. Incumbent mayor Cory Mason is not seeking re-election.

=== Waukesha County ===
==== Waukesha County executive ====
A regularly scheduled county executive election will be held in Waukesha County, concurrent with the Spring general election on April 6, 2027.
