= Caldwell v. J. H. Findorff & Son, Inc. =

2005 Wisconsin Court of Appeals case

- Court: Wisconsin Court of Appeals
- Full case name: Caldwell v. J. H. Findorff & Son, Inc.
- Decided: April 21, 2005
- Citation: 2005 WI App 111; 283 Wis. 2d 508; 698 N.W.2d 132

Case history
- Subsequent actions: Petition denied, 286 Wis. 2d 99, 705 N.W.2d 660 (2005)

Court membership
- Judges sitting: Charles P. Dykman, Margaret J. Vergeront, Paul Lundsten

Case opinions
- Decision by: Dykman

Caldwell v. J. H. Findorff & Son, Inc., 2005 WI App 111, 283 Wis. 2d 508, 698 N.W.2d 132, was a 2005 case heard by the Wisconsin Court of Appeals in the United States.

== Background ==
Yahara Elementary in DeForest, Wisconsin, opened for the 1992–93 school year. In March 2002, 340 students at Yahara Elementary (Deforest, Wisconsin) were sent home due to an issue with excessive moisture in the building causing toxic mold to grow in the ventilation ducts, pipes, and on carpets. Three teachers, a custodian, and a student were suffering with respiratory problems and were insistent on taking the company, J.H. Findorff & Son, Inc. to court because they believed the mold issues were a product of the school having been built improperly. Two of the teachers a custodian and a student were involved in the lawsuit.

== Trial court ==
On August 20, 2002, the plaintiffs sued Findorff in Dane County under the safe place statute and in strict liability alleging the defects in the original design and in construction that caused the excess moisture. The circuit court concluded that the plaintiffs discovered the cause of their symptoms more than three years before filing this suit making their claims time-barred. The plaintiffs claims under the safe place statute failed because the information submitted did not show that Findorff had custody or control of the area, the negligence claims failed too because none of their witnesses offered standard care opinions regarding Findorff. The plaintiffs then appealed the decision.

== Decision ==
In April 2005, the Wisconsin Court of Appeals reversed the lower court in an opinion written by judge Dykman. The decision stated, in regards to the statute of limitations, that when the symptoms were discovered to be caused by the HVAC system was a question of fact that must be determined by the jury. As to the standard of care on the negligence claim, the court said that plaintiffs had submitted deposition testimony from an expert that could be used to establish the standard of care. The court then remanded the case back to the circuit court for a trial.
