= 2003 Wisconsin Supreme Court election =

- April 1, 2003
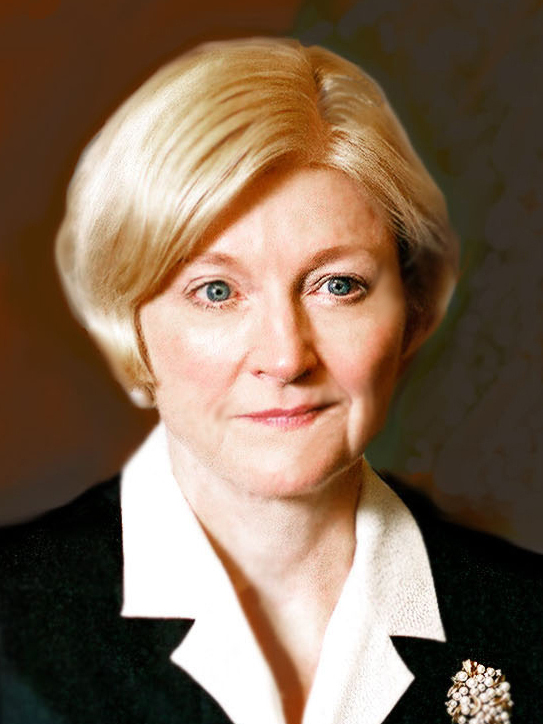

Candidate	Patience Roggensack	Edward R. Brunner
Popular vote	409,422	390,215
Percentage	51.13%	48.73%
- Roggensack: 50–60% 60–70% Brunner: 50–60% 60–70% 70–80% 80–90%
Justice before election
William A. Bablitch
Elected Justice
Patience Roggensack

The 2003 Wisconsin Supreme Court election was held on April 1, 2003, to elect a justice to the Wisconsin Supreme Court for a ten-year term. Patience Roggensack defeated Edward R. Brunner and Paul B. Higginbotham (the latter of whom was eliminated in a nonpartisan primary). Incumbent justice William A. Bablitch did not seek re-election.

Prior to the election, the court's ideological composition had 3 liberal justices, 3 conservative justices, and 1 centrist justice. By replacing the liberal Bablitch with the conservative Roggensack, the election resulted in a short-lived conservative ideological majority on the court (after Louis B. Butler's appointment the next year, this majority would be lost).

== Results ==
2003 Wisconsin Supreme Court election
Party	Candidate	Votes	%
Primary Election, February 19, 2003
Nonpartisan	Patience Roggensack	109,501	39.36
Nonpartisan	Edward R. Brunner	89,494	32.17
Nonpartisan	Paul B. Higginbotham	77,584	27.89
	Write-ins	1,604	0.58
Total votes		278,183	100
General Election, April 1, 2003
Nonpartisan	Patience Roggensack	409,422	51.13
Nonpartisan	Edward R. Brunner	390,215	48.73
	Write-ins	1,148	0.14
Total votes		800,785	100
