= Goethel =

Goethel or Göthel is a German surname. Notable people with the surname include:

- Karl J. Goethel (1930–1996), American lawyer and politician
- Ralf Göthel, East German biathlete
- Travis Goethel (born 1987), American football player

== See also ==
- Gothel (disambiguation)
