= Judge Higginbotham =

Judge Higginbotham may refer to:

- A. Leon Higginbotham Jr. (1928–1998), judge of the United States Court of Appeals for the Third Circuit
- Patrick Higginbotham (born 1938), judge of the United States Court of Appeals for the Fifth Circuit
- Paul B. Higginbotham (born 1954), judge of the Wisconsin Court of Appeals
