= Paul C. Gartzke =

American lawyer and judge (1927–2009)

The Honorable Paul C. Gartzke

Presiding Judge of the Wisconsin Court of Appeals District IV
- In office August 1, 1978 – July 31, 1996
- Preceded by: Position established
- Succeeded by: Charles P. Dykman

Judge of the Wisconsin Court of Appeals District IV
- In office August 1, 1978 – July 31, 1996
- Preceded by: Position established
- Succeeded by: Patience D. Roggensack

Personal details
- Born: October 6, 1927 Milwaukee, Wisconsin
- Died: September 25, 2009 (aged 81) Madison, Wisconsin
- Spouse: Waltraud Emilie Dorothea Denker (m. 1952)
- Children: Ann, Dan, Alice
- Education: University of Iowa (B.S.); Harvard Law School (J.D.); University of Virginia School of Law (M.S.)

Military service
- Allegiance: United States
- Branch/service: United States Navy; U.S. Navy Reserve
- Years of service: 1945–1947 (USN); 1947–1949 (USNR)

Paul Coulter Gartzke (October 6, 1927 – September 25, 2009) was an American lawyer and judge. He served 18 years as presiding judge of the Wisconsin Court of Appeals in the Madison-based District IV court.

== Early life and education ==
Born in Milwaukee, Wisconsin, Gartzke attended school in the neighboring community of Shorewood, Wisconsin, and graduated from Shorewood High School in 1945. Immediately after graduation, Gartzke enlisted for service in the United States Navy. He received an honorable discharge after two years of service and remained in the United States Navy Reserve until 1949. He attended Milwaukee State Teachers College, then graduated Phi Beta Kappa from the University of Iowa, earning his bachelor's degree in economics. He continued his education at Harvard Law School, where he received his Juris Doctor in 1952. He would return to school much later in life, earning his master's degree in judicial process from the University of Virginia School of Law in 1992.

== Legal career ==
Shortly after his law school graduation, Gartzke joined a law practice in Madison, Wisconsin. He became a partner in the law firm in 1955, which was later known as Bieberstein, Cooper, Bruemmer, Gartzke & Hanson. In 1958, he was hired by the town of Madison to provide legal guidance in their attempt to thwart the annexation of several parts of their town to the city of Madison. The city of Madison already owned a large piece of the town's land and planned to use their voting power with that land to approve the annexation of a large and tax-rich industrial section of the town. Gartzke came to also represent the neighboring town of Fitchburg, which was also impacted by the annexation plan. Together the two towns attempted a plan to incorporate as a village to block the annexation. The dispute wound up before the Wisconsin Supreme Court in 1960, which ultimately ruled in favor of the city of Madison, allowing the annexation. Although unsuccessful in their resistance, the situation and its resolution led to the eventual incorporation of the city of Fitchburg to block further annexations.

== Judicial career ==
In 1977, Gartzke was elected president of the Dane County Bar Association. That same year, Wisconsin voters approved a series of referendums restructuring the state judiciary and creating a new Court of Appeals. A few months later, Gartzke announced he would run for one of the newly created appeals court seats. With a close second-place finish in the nonpartisan primary, Gartzke advanced to an April general election against Howard H. Boyle, a Dodge County court commissioner who had previously run for state supreme court and United States Senate. In the election, Boyle stressed ideology and strictly interpreting the statutes and constitution. Gartzke, on the other hand, made a non-ideological argument for his candidacy, focused on the importance of competent legal experience and prioritizing the establishment of the good functioning of the new appeals court system. In the end, Gartzke prevailed with a slim majority. Gartzke would be re-elected without opposition in 1984 and 1990. Shortly after his election, the Wisconsin Supreme Court selected Gartzke as presiding judge for District IV, a position he held through his entire judicial career.

He retired in 1996, but continued to serve for several years as a reserve judge.

=== Seraphim suspension ===
Early in his judicial career, in 1979, Judge Gartzke was selected by the Wisconsin Supreme Court to review allegations of misconduct by Milwaukee County Circuit Judge Christ T. Seraphim. Judge Seraphim had long been a controversial figure in Milwaukee county and charges of misconduct had accumulated over his 20-year judicial career; the investigation was one of the first tests of new judicial conduct review procedures. Ultimately, the panel recommended Seraphim should be removed or suspended for several violations of the code of judicial ethics, including sexual harassment and the appearance of accepting a bribe. The Supreme Court agreed with the panel's recommendation and suspended Seraphim from judicial service for three years.

=== Judge McDonald appeal ===
In 1985, Lafayette County Circuit Judge Daniel McDonald was convicted in the murder of Darlington attorney James Klein. Judge McDonald was in the process of appealing his conviction when, in 1986, he committed suicide by drug overdose. McDonald's lawyers, however, continued to pursue the appeal asking for the conviction to be vacated. The case was before Judge Gartzke, who decided to dismiss the appeal and let the conviction stand. Despite similarities to a previous appeal where the appellant died of a heart attack, Judge Gartzke ruled that by choosing to commit suicide, Judge McDonald chose to forfeit his appeal and thus was not entitled to a posthumous review of his conviction.

== Personal life and family ==
Judge Gartzke married Waltraud Emilie Dorothea "Emy" Denker in August 1952. At the time of their wedding, Emy, a German student, was working at the Ray-O-Vac Corporation for a chemistry work-training program. They met while traveling from Europe to the United States. Judge Gartzke and his wife had one son and two daughters. At the time of his death, Judge Gartzke had five grandchildren.

Outside of his legal and judicial career, Judge Gartzke was president and one of the founders of the Bayview Foundation, a nonprofit organization in Madison created to provide affordable housing in the city. They secured Section 8 funding under the Federal Housing Administration and constructed the Bayview Townhouses and community center in Madison's historic Greenbush Neighborhood. Bayview remains a flourishing community with approximately 300 residents living in subsidized housing. He also served on the Wisconsin Historical Society Board of Curators.

== Electoral history ==
=== Wisconsin Appeals Court (1978, 1984, 1990) ===
Wisconsin Court of Appeals, District IV Election, 1978
Party	Candidate	Votes	%	±%
Nonpartisan Primary, February 21, 1978
Nonpartisan	Howard H. Boyle Jr.	15,803	26.38%	
Nonpartisan	Paul C. Gartzke	15,275	25.50%	
Nonpartisan	Gerald W. Jaeckle	10,668	17.81%	
Nonpartisan	Edmund A. Nix	9,302	15.53%	
Nonpartisan	Edward Nager	8,864	14.80%	
Total votes		59,912	100.0%	
General Election, April 4, 1978
Nonpartisan	Paul C. Gartzke	96,865	50.40%	
Nonpartisan	Howard H. Boyle Jr.	95,310	49.60%	
Plurality		1,555	0.81%	
Total votes		192,175	100.0%	

Legal offices
New court	Judge of the Wisconsin Court of Appeals District IV; August 1, 1978 – July 31, 1996	Succeeded by Patience D. Roggensack
New court	Presiding Judge of the Wisconsin Court of Appeals District IV; August 1, 1978 – July 31, 1996	Succeeded by Charles P. Dykman
