= Brian Blanchard =

American judge (born 1958)

The Honorable Brian Blanchard

Judge of the Wisconsin Court of Appeals District IV
- Incumbent
- Assumed office August 1, 2010
- Preceded by: Charles P. Dykman

District Attorney of Dane County, Wisconsin
- In office January 1, 2001 – July 31, 2010
- Preceded by: Diane Nicks
- Succeeded by: Ismael Ozanne

Personal details
- Born: November 7, 1958 (age 67) State College, Pennsylvania, U.S.
- Party: Democratic
- Spouse: Mary
- Children: 3
- Education: University of Michigan (B.A.); Northwestern University Law School (J.D.)
- Profession: attorney, prosecutor, judge

Brian Blanchard (born November 7, 1958) is an American lawyer, judge, and former politician. He is a judge of the Wisconsin Court of Appeals in the Madison-based District IV; originally elected in 2010, he has announced he will retire in November 2026. He previously served nine years as district attorney of Dane County, Wisconsin, and served seven years as an assistant U.S. attorney in the Northern District of Illinois.

== Biography ==
Born in State College, Pennsylvania, Judge Brian W. Blanchard graduated from the University of Michigan with honors and from the Northwestern University School of Law, where he was editor-in-chief of the Northwestern University Law Review. Blanchard is married to Mary Blanchard and has three children; Will, Ben, and Allison.

== Career ==
Blanchard was an assistant United States attorney in Chicago, Illinois, from 1990 to 1997. In 1997, he moved to Madison, Wisconsin, and joined a private practice. He later became district attorney of Dane County, Wisconsin, and served in that position from 2001 until his election to the Court of Appeals in 2010.

== Electoral history ==
Wisconsin Court of Appeals, District IV Election, 2010
Party	Candidate	Votes	%
General Election, April 6, 2010
Nonpartisan	Brian Blanchard	104,918	62.65%
Nonpartisan	Edward E. Leineweber	62,135	37.10%
	Scattering	418	0.25%
Plurality		42,783	25.55%
Total votes		167,471	100.0%

Legal offices
Preceded by Diane Nicks	District Attorney of Dane County, Wisconsin; January 1, 2001 – July 31, 2010	Succeeded by Ismael Ozanne
Preceded by Charles P. Dykman	Judge of the Wisconsin Court of Appeals District IV; August 1, 2010 – present	Incumbent
