= Timothy Dugan =

American judge (born 1953)

The Honorable Timothy G. Dugan

Judge of the Wisconsin Court of Appeals for the 1st district
- In office December 10, 2016 – November 18, 2023
- Appointed by: Scott Walker
- Preceded by: Patricia S. Curley
- Succeeded by: Pedro Colón

Wisconsin Circuit Court Judge for the Milwaukee Circuit, Branch 10
- In office 1992 – October 27, 2016
- Appointed by: Tommy Thompson
- Preceded by: Rudolph T. Randa
- Succeeded by: Michelle Ackerman Havas

Personal details
- Born: October 9, 1953 (age 72) Milford, Connecticut, U.S.
- Spouse: Susan
- Children: 2
- Education: Westminster College (B.A.); Marquette Law School (J.D.)
- Profession: Lawyer

Timothy G. Dugan (born October 9, 1953) is an American lawyer and jurist from Milwaukee County, Wisconsin. He served as a judge of the Wisconsin Court of Appeals in the Milwaukee-based 1st district from 2016 through 2023. Prior to his tenure on the Court of Appeals, he served for 13 years as a Wisconsin circuit court judge in Milwaukee County.

== Biography ==
Born in Milford, Connecticut, Dugan graduated from Westminster College in pennsylvania in 1975. He then earned his Juris Doctor degree from Marquette University Law School in 1978. He resided in Shorewood, Wisconsin. In 1992, Dugan was appointed to the Wisconsin Circuit Court in Milwaukee County by Governor Tommy Thompson. He was re-elected to the Circuit Court without opposition in 1993, 1999, 2005, and 2011.

During his judicial career, Judge Dugan has been President of the Milwaukee Trial Judges Association and served as the Associate Dean of the Wisconsin Judicial College. In 2008, Judge Dugan was nominated by President George W. Bush to the United States District Court for the Eastern District of Wisconsin to replace retiring Judge Rudolph T. Randa, but Judge Randa chose to rescind his resignation.

In 2015, Dugan was a finalist under consideration by Governor Scott Walker for appointment to the Wisconsin Court of Appeals after Judge Rebecca Bradley's elevation to the Wisconsin Supreme Court; that seat instead went to William W. Brash III. Governor Walker ultimately appointed Judge Dugan to the Court of Appeals in October 2016 to replace retiring Judge Patricia S. Curley. He was re-elected without opposition in 2018.

Dugan has announced he will not run for re-election in 2024 and will leave office early in November 2023.

== Electoral history ==
=== Wisconsin Circuit Court (1992, 1993, 1999, 2005, 2011) ===
Wisconsin Circuit Court, Milwaukee Circuit, Branch 24 Election, 1992
Party	Candidate	Votes	%	±%
General Election, April 7, 1992
Nonpartisan	Charles Kahn	118,822	51.46%	
Nonpartisan	Timothy G. Dugan	112,068	48.54%	
Total votes		230,890	100.0%	

Wisconsin Circuit Court, Milwaukee Circuit, Branch 10 Election, 1993
Party	Candidate	Votes	%	±%
General Election, April 6, 1993
Nonpartisan	Timothy G. Dugan (incumbent)	98,173	100.0%	
Total votes		98,173	100.0%	

Wisconsin Circuit Court, Milwaukee Circuit, Branch 10 Election, 1999
Party	Candidate	Votes	%	±%
General Election, April 6, 1999
Nonpartisan	Timothy G. Dugan (incumbent)	65,931	100.0%	
Total votes		65,931	100.0%	

Wisconsin Circuit Court, Milwaukee Circuit, Branch 10 Election, 2005
Party	Candidate	Votes	%	±%
General Election, April 5, 2005
Nonpartisan	Timothy G. Dugan (incumbent)	46,092	99.22%	
	Scattering	361	0.78%	
Total votes		46,453	100.0%	

Wisconsin Circuit Court, Milwaukee Circuit, Branch 10 Election, 2011
Party	Candidate	Votes	%	±%
General Election, April 5, 2011
Nonpartisan	Timothy G. Dugan (incumbent)	127,244	98.76%	
	Scattering	1,600	1.24%	
Total votes		128,844	100.0%	

=== Wisconsin Court of Appeals (2018) ===
Wisconsin Court of Appeals, District I Election, 2018
Party	Candidate	Votes	%	±%
General Election, April 3, 2018
Nonpartisan	Timothy G. Dugan (incumbent)	70,346	98.40%	
	Scattering	1,141	1.60%	
Total votes		71,487	100.0%	

Legal offices
Preceded by Rudolph T. Randa	Wisconsin Circuit Court Judge for the Milwaukee Circuit, Branch 10; 1992 – 2016	Succeeded by Michelle Ackerman Havas
Preceded by Patricia S. Curley	Judge of the Wisconsin Court of Appeals for the 1st district 2016 – 2023	Succeeded by Pedro Colón
