= Gothel =

Gothel may refer to:

- Dame Gothel, a fictional character from the German fairy tale "Rapunzel"
- Gothel, a fictional character who appears in the animated movie Barbie as Rapunzel
- Mother Gothel, a fictional character who appears Disney animated film Tangled

== See also ==
- Goethel, a German surname
