= Michael T. Sullivan =

20th century American judge

The Honorable Michael T. Sullivan

Judge of the Wisconsin Court of Appeals District I
- In office August 1, 1984 – July 31, 1996
- Preceded by: John A. Decker
- Succeeded by: Patricia S. Curley

Chief Judge of the 1st district of Wisconsin Circuit Courts
- In office August 1, 1978 – December 15, 1979
- Preceded by: Howard J. DuRocher (Wisconsin courts)
- Succeeded by: Victor Manian

Chief Judge of the 4th district of Wisconsin courts
- In office October 1975 – July 31, 1978
- Preceded by: Position established
- Succeeded by: Allan J. Deehr (Wisconsin Circuit Courts)

Wisconsin Circuit Court Judge for the Milwaukee Circuit, Branch 11
- Acting
- In office August 1, 1981 – July 1983
- Preceded by: Christ T. Seraphim
- Succeeded by: Christ T. Seraphim

Wisconsin Circuit Court Judge for the Milwaukee Circuit, Branch 21
- In office August 1, 1978 – January 1, 1980
- Preceded by: Transitioned from County Court
- Succeeded by: Clarence R. Parrish

Wisconsin Circuit Court Judge for the 2nd Circuit, Branch 2
- In office September 1953 – October 9, 1963
- Appointed by: Walter J. Kohler Jr.
- Preceded by: Ronold A. Drechsler
- Succeeded by: Max Raskin

County Judge for Milwaukee County, Branch 2
- In office October 9, 1963 – July 31, 1978
- Appointed by: John W. Reynolds Jr.
- Preceded by: Roy R. Stauff
- Succeeded by: Transitioned to Circuit Court

Personal details
- Born: July 18, 1924 Milwaukee, Wisconsin
- Died: March 20, 2007 (aged 82)
- Cause of death: Post-polio syndrome
- Resting place: Holy Cross Cemetery; Milwaukee, Wisconsin
- Spouse: Jeanne
- Children: Michael T. Sullivan Jr.
- Education: Marquette University (B.A.); Marquette Law School (J.D.); UIC John Marshall Law School (LL.M.)
- Profession: lawyer, judge

Michael T. Sullivan (July 18, 1924 – March 20, 2007) was an American lawyer and judge. He was a judge of the Wisconsin Court of Appeals for 12 years, after serving nearly 30 years as a trial court judge in Milwaukee County.

== Early life and education ==
Sullivan was born in Milwaukee, Wisconsin. As a child, he developed paralysis due to the Polio virus, which left him reliant on crutches and wheelchairs for nearly his entire life. He would graduate from Marquette University and earned his J.D. from the Marquette University Law School. He returned to school later in life and received his LL.M. in taxation from UIC John Marshall Law School in 1972.

== Judicial career ==
In 1953, at age 28, Sullivan ran for Wisconsin Circuit Court in the Milwaukee-based 2nd circuit. He challenged incumbent Judge Ronold A. Drechsler, who had been appointed in 1952 to fill the vacancy caused by the death of Judge Daniel W. Sullivan. At the time of the election, a poll of the Milwaukee Bar Association senior membership found that 96.7% did not think Michael Sullivan was qualified for the job. However, the membership may have been somewhat biased by the fact that Judge Drechsler was a past president of the organization. Nevertheless, Sullivan won a narrow victory in the April election, carrying 52% of the Milwaukee county electorate and defeating Judge Drechsler by about 10,000 votes. At the time, some local journalists attributed his win to the fact that he shared the name "Sullivan" with the recently deceased judge, although there was no known familial relation. Sullivan was then appointed to begin his term early when Judge Drechsler was appointed to a different judicial vacancy in September 1953.

Judge Sullivan was re-elected in 1959, but left the circuit court in October 1963, when he was appointed County probate court Judge by Governor John W. Reynolds Jr. Although the circuit court would appear to be a more prestigious appointment within the state judiciary, the probate court offered more patronage opportunities and was therefore seen as a more lucrative position for Sullivan's personal advancement. He remained in that office for the next fifteen years.

=== Court reorganization ===
In the mid-1970s, the Wisconsin Supreme Court began experimenting with organizational reforms to the state court system and, in 1975, set up 14 judicial administrative districts—each with a chief judge tasked with managing judicial assignments for circuit and county judges in the district and supervising court schedules. Judge Sullivan was elected Chief Judge for the Milwaukee district by a vote of his colleagues, but, within a year, his attempts to apply the new powers prescribed by the Supreme Court led to significant pushback from judges in Milwaukee County—who questioned both Judge Sullivan's methods and the constitutional authority of the state Supreme Court to impose such rules on the judges.

The need for reform, confronted by the objections of the judges, necessitated a legislative and constitutional solution. This controversy resulted in the 1977 referendums on amendments to the Constitution of Wisconsin which created the Wisconsin Court of Appeals, gave new powers to the state Supreme Court, and enabled the legislation which flattened the county and circuit court system. Throughout the reorganization process, Judge Sullivan was outspoken as an advocate for judges in the discussion, offering his suggestions for the reorganization plan and identifying flaws that needed to be addressed in the new system. Following the judicial reorganization plan, the Milwaukee County court was combined with the 2nd circuit to create the Milwaukee Circuit court. Judge Sullivan transitioned from a Milwaukee County judge to a judge for the Milwaukee circuit, effective August 1, 1978. Judge Sullivan was also selected to remain in his role as Chief Judge for the Milwaukee district—with the chief judges now appointed by the Wisconsin Supreme Court.

After a year of the new system, however, Judge Sullivan announced his plan to resign, effective January 1, 1980, for personal reasons. Over the next several years, Sullivan continued to serve as a reserve judge, and became a full time acting judge for Branch 11 of the Milwaukee circuit when Judge Christ T. Seraphim was suspended for misconduct in office. In 1982, he solicited appointment to the Wisconsin Supreme Court in the event of Justice John Louis Coffey's appointment to the United States Court of Appeals for the Seventh Circuit, but Governor Lee S. Dreyfus instead appointed Louis J. Ceci.

=== Bail-for-profit dispute ===
In the month before his 1979 resignation, Judge Sullivan received an informal reprimand from the state Ethics Board. The reprimand resulted from Judge Sullivan's complaints against two state legislators, Speaker Edward Jackamonis and Edward F. McClain, who he accused of interfering in the judiciary. He also publicly accused fellow Milwaukee judge Fred Kessler, himself a former-legislator, of conspiring with the Assembly leadership to circumvent his ruling which had enabled bail for profit operations in the state. Sullivan ultimately withdrew his complaints, but the Ethics Board scolded him for the public nature of his complaint, saying that his actions were "contrary to the Ethics Code's purpose of promoting faith and confidence of the people of this state in their state public officials."

== Court of Appeals ==
In 1984, Judge Sullivan was elected to the Wisconsin Court of Appeals. He was re-elected in 1990, but was defeated in 1996 by Circuit Court Judge Patricia S. Curley, though he continued to serve as a reserve judge.

== Family and personal life ==
Over the course of his life, Judge Sullivan donated 257 pints of blood. Having contracted poliomyelitis during childhood, Judge Sullivan died of post-polio syndrome. He was preceded in death by his wife, Jeanne. They had one son, Michael Jr., who followed his father into the legal profession.

== Electoral history ==
=== Wisconsin Circuit Court (1953, 1959) ===
Wisconsin Circuit Court, 2nd Circuit, Branch 2 Election, 1953
Party	Candidate	Votes	%	±%
General Election, April 7, 1953
Nonpartisan	Michael T. Sullivan	104,171	52.79%	
Nonpartisan	Ronold A. Drechsler (incumbent)	93,145	47.21%	
Total votes		197,316	100.0%	

Wisconsin Circuit Court, 2nd Circuit, Branch 2 Election, 1959
Party	Candidate	Votes	%	±%
General Election, April 7, 1959
Nonpartisan	Michael T. Sullivan (incumbent)	79,641	100.0%	
Total votes		79,641	100.0%	

=== Wisconsin Court of Appeals (1984, 1990, 1996) ===
Wisconsin Court of Appeals, District I Election, 1984
Party	Candidate	Votes	%	±%
General Election, April 3, 1984
Nonpartisan	Michael T. Sullivan	142,582	100.0%	
Total votes		142,582	100.0%	

Wisconsin Court of Appeals, District I Election, 1990
Party	Candidate	Votes	%	±%
General Election, April 3, 1990
Nonpartisan	Michael T. Sullivan (incumbent)	76,055	100.0%	
Total votes		76,055	100.0%	

Wisconsin Court of Appeals, District I Election, 1996
Party	Candidate	Votes	%	±%
Primary Election, February 6, 1996
Nonpartisan	Patricia S. Curley	38,023	45.19%	
Nonpartisan	Michael T. Sullivan (incumbent)	37,875	45.02%	
Nonpartisan	Lew A. Wasserman	8,238	9.79%	
Total votes		84,136	100.0%	
General Election, March 19, 1996
Nonpartisan	Patricia S. Curley	136,650	66.97%	
Nonpartisan	Michael T. Sullivan (incumbent)	67,386	33.03%	
Total votes		204,036	100.0%	

Legal offices
Preceded by Ronold A. Drechsler	Wisconsin Circuit Court Judge for the 2nd Circuit, Branch 2 September 1953 – October 9, 1963	Succeeded by Max Raskin
Preceded by Roy R. Stauff	County Judge for Milwaukee County, Branch 2 October 9, 1963 – July 31, 1978	Court abolished
Position created	Chief Judge of the 4th district of Wisconsin courts October 1975 – July 31, 1978	Succeeded by Allan J. Deehr (Wisconsin Circuit Courts)
Preceded by Howard J. DuRocher (Wisconsin courts)	Chief Judge of the 1st district of Wisconsin Circuit Courts; August 1, 1978 – December 15, 1979	Succeeded by Victor Manian
New circuit	Wisconsin Circuit Court Judge for the Milwaukee Circuit, Branch 21; August 1, 1978 – January 1, 1980	Succeeded by Clarence R. Parrish
Preceded by Christ T. Seraphim	Wisconsin Circuit Court Judge for the Milwaukee Circuit, Branch 11 (Acting); August 1, 1981 – July 1983	Succeeded by Christ T. Seraphim
Preceded by John A. Decker	Judge of the Wisconsin Court of Appeals District I August 1, 1984 – July 31, 1996	Succeeded by Patricia S. Curley
