= Michael R. Fitzpatrick =

American judge

Judge of the Wisconsin Court of Appeals District IV
- In office August 1, 2017 – July 31, 2023
- Preceded by: Paul B. Higginbotham
- Succeeded by: Chris Taylor

Wisconsin Circuit Court Judge for the Rock Circuit, Branch 3
- In office 2008 – July 31, 2017
- Appointed by: Jim Doyle
- Preceded by: Michael J. Byron
- Succeeded by: Jeffrey S. Kuglitsch

Personal details
- Spouse: Sharon
- Children: 2
- Education: Drake University
- Profession: lawyer, judge

Michael R. Fitzpatrick is an American lawyer who served as a judge of the Wisconsin Court of Appeals from 2017 to 2023. Previously, he served nine years as a Wisconsin circuit court judge in Rock County.

== Life and career ==
Fitzpatrick received his Juris Doctor degree from Drake University Law School and then practiced law in Janesville, Wisconsin. In 2008, Fitzpatrick was appointed to the Rock County Circuit Court by Governor Jim Doyle, a Democrat. He was subsequently elected to two six-years terms on the court, in 2009 and 2015. In April 2017, Fitzpatrick was elected without opposition to the Wisconsin Court of Appeals in District IV, to replace retiring Judge Paul Higginbotham.

Fitzpatrick announced he would not seek re-election to another term on the court in 2023.

== Electoral history ==
=== Wisconsin Circuit Court (2009, 2015) ===
Wisconsin Circuit Court, Rock Circuit, Branch 3 Election, 2009
| Party | Candidate | Votes | % | ±% |
|---|---|---|---|---|
General Election, April 7, 2009
| Nonpartisan | Michael R. Fitzpatrick (incumbent) | 13,005 | 99.65% | |
| | Scattering | 46 | 0.35% | |
| Total votes | | 13,051 | 100.0% | |

Wisconsin Circuit Court, Rock Circuit, Branch 3 Election, 2015
| Party | Candidate | Votes | % | ±% |
|---|---|---|---|---|
General Election, April 7, 2015
| Nonpartisan | Michael R. Fitzpatrick (incumbent) | 14,664 | 99.28% | |
| | Scattering | 107 | 0.72% | |
| Total votes | | 14,771 | 100.0% | |

=== Wisconsin Court of Appeals (2017) ===
Wisconsin Court of Appeals, District IV Election, 2017
| Party | Candidate | Votes | % | ±% |
|---|---|---|---|---|
General Election, April 4, 2017
| Nonpartisan | Michael R. Fitzpatrick | 161,876 | 99.39% | |
| | Scattering | 990 | 0.61% | |
| Total votes | | 162,866 | 100.0% | |

Legal offices
| Preceded by Michael J. Byron | Wisconsin Circuit Court Judge for the Rock Circuit, Branch 3; 2008–2017 | Succeeded by Jeffrey S. Kuglitsch |
| Preceded by Paul B. Higginbotham | Judge of the Wisconsin Court of Appeals District IV; 2017–2023 | Succeeded by Chris Taylor |
