= Jack Dávila =

21st century American judge

The Honorable Jack Dávila

Judge of the Milwaukee County Circuit Court Branch 1
- Incumbent
- Assumed office August 1, 2020
- Appointed by: Tony Evers
- Preceded by: Maxine Aldridge White

Personal details
- Education: University of Wisconsin–Madison; Marquette University Law School

Military service
- Allegiance: United States
- Branch/service: United States Army
- Years of service: 2002–2006

Jack L. Dávila is an American lawyer and judge from Milwaukee, Wisconsin. He is a Wisconsin circuit court judge in Milwaukee County; he was appointed by Governor Tony Evers in 2020 and elected to a full term in 2021.

== Life and career ==
He received a B.A. from the University of Wisconsin in 2002. After college, he served in the U.S. Army as a Spanish linguist. He then attended Marquette University Law School, where he received a J.D. in 2011. Following law school Dávila was an attorney at Tabak Law Firm followed by the Previant Law Firm, where he represented plaintiffs in personal injury and workers compensation cases. In 2020, Governor Tony Evers appointed Dávila to the circuit court after he appointed his predecessor, Maxine White, to the Wisconsin Court of Appeals. He was elected in 2021 after running unopposed.

Legal offices
Preceded by Maxine Aldridge White	Wisconsin Circuit Judge for the Milwaukee Circuit, Branch 1; 2020 – present	Incumbent
