= Maxine Aldridge White =

21st century American judge

The Honorable Maxine Aldridge White

Chief Judge of the Wisconsin Court of Appeals
- In office August 1, 2023 – April 3, 2026
- Appointed by: Wisconsin Supreme Court
- Preceded by: William W. Brash III
- Succeeded by: Joe Donald

Judge of the Wisconsin Court of Appeals District I
- In office February 7, 2020 – April 3, 2026
- Appointed by: Tony Evers
- Preceded by: Joan F. Kessler
- Succeeded by: Nathan A. Petrashek

Chief Judge of the 1st District of Wisconsin Circuit Courts
- In office August 1, 2015 – February 7, 2020
- Preceded by: Jeffrey Kremers
- Succeeded by: Mary Triggiano

Judge of the Milwaukee County Circuit Court Branch 1
- In office August 1, 1994 – February 7, 2020
- Appointed by: Tommy Thompson
- Preceded by: Charles B. Schudson
- Succeeded by: Jack Dávila

Personal details
- Born: 1951 (age 74–75) Mississippi
- Education: Alcorn State University (B.A.); University of Southern California (M.A.); Marquette Law School (J.D.)
- Salary: $150,280
- Website: Judge Maxine Aldridge White

Maxine Aldridge White (born 1951) is an American attorney and retired judge from Milwaukee, Wisconsin. She was the chief judge of the Wisconsin Court of Appeals from 2023 to 2026, and served on the Court of Appeals in the Milwaukee-based District I court from 2020 to 2026. She was the first African-American woman to serve on the Wisconsin Court of Appeals.

White previously served 18 years as a Wisconsin circuit court judge in Milwaukee County, and was chief judge for the 1st Judicial Administrative District from 2015 until her appointment to the Court of Appeals in 2020. Earlier in her career, she was a federal prosecutor in the Eastern District of Wisconsin.

== Life and career ==
White was born in rural Mississippi and raised in a family of cotton sharecroppers. White received her bachelor's degree from Alcorn State University in 1973 and her master's degree from the University of Southern California in 1982. White served in the Milwaukee office of the Social Security Administration before graduating from Marquette University Law School in 1985. From 1985 to 1992, White served as an Assistant United States Attorney for the Eastern District of Wisconsin. White was the first African-American woman to serve as a federal prosecutor in the Eastern District of Wisconsin.

In 1992, White was appointed to the Wisconsin Circuit Court in Milwaukee County by then-Governor Tommy Thompson, a Republican. White served as a deputy chief judge of the court prior to 2015. In 2015, the Wisconsin Supreme Court appointed White as the court's chief judge. White is the first African-American chief judge in the court's history. As Chief Judge, White was responsible for securing a $4.5 million grant from the MacArthur Foundation for reducing jail misuse.

In 2019, a minority of Milwaukee County Judges petitioned the Wisconsin Supreme Court to prevent her being re-appointed to another term as Chief Judge, but the Supreme Court reaffirmed her appointment.

In 2020, White was appointed to the Wisconsin Court of Appeals by Governor Tony Evers, a Democrat, succeeding the retiring Joan F. Kessler. Upon assuming office, White became the first African-American woman to serve on the Court of Appeals.

In 2023, the incumbent chief judge of the Wisconsin Court of Appeals, William W. Brash III, was defeated running for re-election. Subsequently, the Wisconsin Supreme Court appointed White to succeed him as chief judge of the Court of Appeals at the start of the new term, August 1, 2023.

Legal offices
| Preceded by Charles B. Schudson | Wisconsin Circuit Court Judge for the Milwaukee Circuit, Branch 1; 1992 – 2020 | Succeeded by Jack Dávila |
| Preceded by Jeffrey Kremers | Chief Judge of the 1st District of Wisconsin Circuit Courts; 2015 – 2020 | Succeeded by Mary Triggiano |
| Preceded by Joan F. Kessler | Judge of the Wisconsin Court of Appeals District I 2020 – 2026 | Succeeded by Nathan Petrashek |
| Preceded by William W. Brash III | Chief Judge of the Wisconsin Court of Appeals; 2023 – 2026 | Succeeded by Joe Donald |
