= Patricia S. Curley =

Retired American judge (born 1946)

The Honorable Patricia S. Curley

Judge of the Wisconsin Court of Appeals District I
- In office August 1, 1996 – December 10, 2016
- Preceded by: Michael T. Sullivan
- Succeeded by: Timothy G. Dugan

Wisconsin Circuit Court Judge for the Milwaukee Circuit, Branch 3
- In office August 1, 1978 – July 31, 1996
- Appointed by: Martin J. Schreiber
- Preceded by: Position established
- Succeeded by: Clare L. Fiorenza

Personal details
- Born: October 25, 1946 (age 79) Milwaukee, Wisconsin
- Parent: Judge Robert M. Curley (father)
- Education: Marquette University (B.A.); Marquette Law School (J.D.)

Patricia S. Curley (born October 25, 1946) is an American lawyer and retired judge. She served on the Wisconsin Court of Appeals in the Milwaukee-based District I from 1996 until her retirement in 2016, and served as its presiding judge from 2007. Prior to her election to the Court of Appeals, she served 18 years as a Wisconsin circuit court judge in Milwaukee County.

== Biography ==
Born in Milwaukee, Curley is the daughter of Judge Robert M. Curley, a legislator and Wisconsin Circuit Court judge. She received her bachelor's degree from Marquette University in 1969 and graduated from Marquette University Law School in 1973. From 1973 to 1978, Curley was employed as an assistant district attorney in Milwaukee County, serving in the office's sensitive crimes unit under District Attorney E. Michael McCann.

In July 1978, Curley was appointed to the Milwaukee County Circuit Court by Governor Martin J. Schreiber; she was elected to a six-year term on the court in April 1979 and subsequently re-elected in 1985 and 1991. During her tenure on the circuit court, Curley specialized in family law and served ten years as a family court judge.

In 1996, Judge Curley challenged incumbent Wisconsin Court of Appeals Judge Michael T. Sullivan. After a contentious campaign, Curley defeated Judge Sullivan. Judge Curley went on to win re-election in 2002 and 2008. In 2007, Curley succeeded Judge Ted E. Wedemeyer, Jr., as presiding judge of District I.

== Electoral history ==
=== Wisconsin Court of Appeals (1996, 2002, 2008, 2014) ===
Wisconsin Court of Appeals, District I Election, 1996
Party	Candidate	Votes	%	±%
Primary Election, February 6, 1996
Nonpartisan	Patricia S. Curley	38,023	45.19%	
Nonpartisan	Michael T. Sullivan (incumbent)	37,875	45.02%	
Nonpartisan	Lew A. Wasserman	8,238	9.79%	
Total votes		'84,136'	'100.0%'	
General Election, March 19, 1996
Nonpartisan	Patricia S. Curley	136,650	66.97%	
Nonpartisan	Michael T. Sullivan (incumbent)	67,386	33.03%	
Total votes		'204,036'	'100.0%'	

Legal offices
Preceded by New circuit	Wisconsin Circuit Court Judge for the Milwaukee Circuit, Branch 3; 1978 – 1996	Succeeded by Clare L. Fiorenza
Preceded by Michael T. Sullivan	Judge of the Wisconsin Court of Appeals District I 1996 – 2016	Succeeded by Timothy G. Dugan
