= Sara Geenen =

21st century American judge

Judge of the Wisconsin Court of Appeals District I
- Incumbent
- Assumed office August 1, 2023
- Preceded by: William W. Brash III

Personal details
- Born: 1981 or 1982 (age 44–45) Kaukauna, Wisconsin, U.S.
- Party: Democratic
- Spouse: Jason Gehring
- Children: 3
- Education: University of Wisconsin–Madison (B.A.); University of Wisconsin Law School (J.D.)
- Profession: Lawyer
- Website: Campaign website

Sara J. Geenen (born 1981/1982) is an American lawyer from Milwaukee, Wisconsin. She is a judge of the Wisconsin Court of Appeals in the Milwaukee-based District I court since August 1, 2023.

== Early life and education ==
Sara Geenen was born and raised in Kaukauna, Wisconsin, in Outagamie County. She graduated from University of Wisconsin–Madison with her bachelor's degree and worked as a field organizer for the 2002 gubernatorial campaign of Jim Doyle. After the campaign, she attended the University of Wisconsin Law School, where she earned her J.D. in 2006.

== Career ==
After law school, Geenen moved to Milwaukee, Wisconsin, where she worked for 16 years as an attorney with The Previant Law Firm S.C., rising to become a partner in the firm. She has specialized in labor and employment law, and has represented primarily workers and labor unions in disputes on issues from wage discrimination and workplace harassment, to contract disputes and collective bargaining issues, to bankruptcy and receivership concerns. In addition to her work in litigation, she gives lectures around the state on labor and employment law.

Geenen made her first run for public office in 2014, when she ran in the Democratic Party primary for Wisconsin State Assembly in the 19th Assembly district. Geenen was the outsider in the race, as her opponents were each backed by a separate powerful faction in Milwaukee politics. Dan Adams was supported by the county executive Chris Abele; Marina Dimitrijevic had her own power base as the chair of the county board and was endorsed by Milwaukee mayor Tom Barrett and U.S. representative Gwen Moore; Jonathan Brostoff had the support of his employer, state senator Chris Larson. She came in a distant fourth place.

In December 2022, Geenen announced that she would run for the Wisconsin Court of Appeals, challenging the incumbent chief judge of the Court of Appeals, William W. Brash III, for his seat on the District I court. Brash had been appointed by former governor Scott Walker in 2015, and was elected without opposition in 2017. The Wisconsin Supreme Court selected him to become chief judge of the Court of Appeals in 2021.

Geenen's campaign focused on her values and mirrored several of the messages of the Wisconsin Supreme Court candidate judge Janet Protasiewicz, who was running for election at the same time. Like Protasiewicz, she singled out the issue of 2011 Wisconsin Act 10—the signature act of the Scott Walker administration—which provoked widespread backlash from unions and Democrats. Geenen also emphasized her bringing a "fresh perspective" to the court—Geenen was 41 at the time of the election, Brash was 71. Brash was endorsed by a significant number of judges and lawyers and had the backing of several prominent conservative donors, while Geenen was endorsed by a large number of unions and local elected officials, and had support from the Democratic Party of Wisconsin.

Geenen ultimately prevailed in the election with 66% of the vote.

== Personal life and family ==
Geenen is a child of a union paper mill employee, and was involved in union activities from an early age.

Geenen is married to attorney Jason Gehring, they live on Milwaukee's east side with their three sons.

== Electoral history ==
=== Wisconsin Assembly (2014) ===
Year	Election	Date	Elected				Defeated				Total	Plurality
2014	Primary	Aug. 12	Jonathan Brostoff	Democratic	3,069	35.15%	Marina Dimitrijevic	Dem.	2,819	32.29%	8,730	250
2014	Primary	Aug. 12	Jonathan Brostoff	Democratic	3,069	35.15%	Dan Adams	Dem.	2,023	23.17%	8,730	250
2014	Primary	Aug. 12	Jonathan Brostoff	Democratic	3,069	35.15%	Sara Geenen	Dem.	797	9.13%	8,730	250

=== Wisconsin Court of Appeals (2023) ===
Wisconsin Court of Appeals District I Election, 2023
Party	Candidate	Votes	%	±%
General Election, April 4, 2023
Nonpartisan	Sara Geenen	130,030	68.18%	
Nonpartisan	Bill Brash (incumbent)	59,587	31.25%	
N/a	Scattering	1,088	0.57%	
Plurality		70,443	36.94%	
Total votes		190,705	100.0%	-1.35%

Legal offices
Preceded by William W. Brash III	Judge of the Wisconsin Court of Appeals for the 1st district August 1, 2023 – present	Incumbent
