= Lisa K. Stark =

American judge (born 1957)

The Honorable Lisa K. Stark

Judge of the Wisconsin Court of Appeals District III
- Incumbent
- Assumed office April 23, 2013
- Appointed by: Scott Walker
- Preceded by: Gregory A. Peterson

Judge of the Eau Claire County Circuit Court Branch 1
- In office August 1, 2000 – April 23, 2013
- Preceded by: Thomas H. Barland
- Succeeded by: Kristina M. Bourget

Personal details
- Born: March 15, 1957 (age 69) Appleton, Wisconsin
- Education: University of Wisconsin–Eau Claire (B.A.); University of Wisconsin Law School (J.D.)
- Profession: lawyer, judge
- Website: Deputy Chief and Presiding Judge Lisa K. Stark

Lisa Kay Stark (born March 15, 1957) is an American judge, serving on the Wisconsin Court of Appeals since 2013. She has been Deputy Chief Judge of the Court of Appeals since 2015. Prior to the Court of Appeals, she was a Wisconsin Circuit Court Judge for 15 years in Eau Claire County.

== Biography ==
Born in Appleton, Wisconsin, Stark graduated from Lincoln High School in Manitowoc, Wisconsin. She received her B.A. from the University of Wisconsin–Eau Claire and her J.D. degree from the University of Wisconsin Law School. She was admitted to the State Bar of Wisconsin in 1982 and practiced law as a partner in the firm Misfeldt, Stark, Richie, Wickstrom & Wachs. She was Chair of the Eau Claire Area Chamber of Commerce in 1999, and was on the board of directors of the London Square Bank from 1995 to 2000.

In 2000, Stark was elected a Wisconsin Circuit Court judge for Eau Claire County, Wisconsin. She was subsequently re-elected in 2006 and 2012. As a circuit court judge, she was presiding judge of the Eau Claire County Drug Court and president of the Eau Claire County Restorative Justice Program. She was appointed Associate Dean of the Wisconsin Judicial College for two three-year terms in 2005 and 2008, and was appointed Dean in 2010 by Chief Justice Shirley Abrahamson.

In November 2012, Judge Gregory A. Peterson announced his plan to retire, creating a vacancy on the Wisconsin Court of Appeals. Judge Stark chose to run for the seat and was unopposed in the 2013 election. Since the seat was already vacated, Governor Scott Walker appointed her to begin the term early—she took office April 23, 2013. From August 2, 2015, Stark has served as presiding judge of the court's Wausau-based District III and as the court's deputy chief judge, serving with Chief Judge Lisa Neubauer. She was re-elected in 2019 without opposition.

== Electoral history ==
=== Wisconsin Circuit Court (2000, 2006, 2012) ===
Wisconsin Circuit Court, Eau Claire Circuit, Branch 1 Election, 2000
Party	Candidate	Votes	%	±%
Primary Election, February 15, 2000
Nonpartisan	Lisa K. Stark	1,708	40.02%	
Nonpartisan	Michael D. O'Brien	1,418	33.22%	
Nonpartisan	Mike O'Brien	1,129	26.45%	
	Scattering	13	0.30%	
Total votes		'4,268'	'100.0%'	
General Election, April 4, 2000
Nonpartisan	Lisa K. Stark	9,217	59.69%	
Nonpartisan	Michael D. O'Brien	6,197	40.13%	
	Scattering	28	0.18%	
Total votes		'15,442'	'100.0%'	

=== Wisconsin Court of Appeals (2013, 2019) ===
Wisconsin Court of Appeals, District III Election, 2013
Party	Candidate	Votes	%	±%
General Election, April 2, 2013
Nonpartisan	Lisa K. Stark	160,981	99.60%	
	Scattering	640	0.40%	
Total votes		'161,621'	'100.0%'	

Wisconsin Court of Appeals, District III Election, 2019
Party	Candidate	Votes	%	±%
General Election, April 2, 2019
Nonpartisan	Lisa K. Stark (incumbent)	224,673	99.55%	
	Scattering	1,018	0.45%	
Total votes		'225,691'	'100.0%'	

Legal offices
Preceded by Thomas H. Barland	Wisconsin Circuit Court Judge for the Eau Claire Circuit, Branch 1; 2000 – 2013	Succeeded by Kristina M. Bourget
Preceded by Gregory A. Peterson	Judge of the Wisconsin Court of Appeals District III; 2013 – present	Incumbent
