= Wilmer R. Waters =

American politician

Wilmer "Rufe" Waters (October 4, 1914 – December 10, 1995) was a member of the Wisconsin State Assembly.

== Biography ==
Waters was born in West Plains, Missouri. He attended Elk Mound High School in Elk Mound, Wisconsin before attending the University of Wisconsin-Eau Claire, the University of Hawaii at Manoa, and the University of Wisconsin-Madison. During World War II, he served in the United States Navy.

== Political career ==
Waters was elected to the Assembly in 1966. He was defeated in his 1968 reelection bid by Joseph Looby, initially losing by a single vote, and after review by the circuit court, the judge declared the margin was two votes. In addition, Waters was president of the Eau Claire, Wisconsin City Council. He was a Republican.
