= William W. Brash III =

American judge (born 1951)

The Honorable William W. Brash III

Chief Judge of the Wisconsin Court of Appeals
- In office August 1, 2021 – July 31, 2023
- Appointed by: Wisconsin Supreme Court
- Preceded by: Lisa S. Neubauer
- Succeeded by: Maxine Aldridge White

Judge of the Wisconsin Court of Appeals District I
- In office October 28, 2015 – July 31, 2023
- Appointed by: Scott Walker
- Preceded by: Rebecca Bradley
- Succeeded by: Sara Geenen

Wisconsin Circuit Court Judge for the Milwaukee Circuit, Branch 21
- In office November 2001 – October 28, 2015
- Appointed by: Scott McCallum
- Preceded by: Stanley A. Miller
- Succeeded by: Cynthia M. Davis

Personal details
- Born: July 15, 1951 (age 75) Panama
- Spouse: Ruth
- Children: 1 son
- Education: St. Norbert College (BA); Marquette University (JD)

William Wheeler Brash III (born July 15, 1951) is an American lawyer and jurist from Wisconsin. He served as the chief judge of the Wisconsin Court of Appeals from 2021 through 2023, and was a member of the Milwaukee-based District I court from 2015 through 2023. He previously served 15 years as a Wisconsin circuit court judge in Milwaukee County.

== Biography ==
Born in Panama and raised in Fox Point, Wisconsin, Brash received his B.A. degree from St. Norbert College in 1973 and his J.D. degree from Marquette University Law School in 1978.

After law school, he practiced law and was a business owner. He then served as a municipal judge in Fox Point from 1984 to 1997, and then as a reserve municipal judge for Milwaukee from 1997 until 2001.

In November 2001 he was appointed to the Wisconsin Circuit Court in Milwaukee County by Governor Scott McCallum. He was re-elected to the Circuit Court in 2002, 2008, and 2014. In 2015, Governor Scott Walker appointed Brash to the Wisconsin Court of Appeals to fill the vacancy created by his appointment of Judge Rebecca Bradley to the Wisconsin Supreme Court. Brash won a full term on the court without opposition in the spring election of 2017. On June 28, 2021, the Wisconsin Supreme Court issued an order naming him the next chief judge, effective August 1, 2021.

He was the Judge for District I through 2023. On April 4, 2023, Brash lost his reelection bid to labor lawyer Sara Geenen.

== Personal life ==
Judge Brash and his wife, Ruth, have one son and reside in Fox Point, Wisconsin.

== Electoral history ==
=== Wisconsin Circuit Court (2002, 2008, 2014) ===
Wisconsin Circuit Court, Milwaukee Circuit, Branch 21 Election, 2002
Party	Candidate	Votes	%	±%
General Election, April 2, 2002
Nonpartisan	Bill Brash (incumbent)	71,362	62.19%	
Nonpartisan	Ramon Valdez	43,047	37.51%	
	Scattering	341	0.30%	
Total votes		114,750	100.0%	

=== Wisconsin Court of Appeals (2017, 2023) ===
Wisconsin Court of Appeals District I Election, 2017
Party	Candidate	Votes	%	±%
General Election, April 4, 2017
Nonpartisan	Bill Brash (incumbent)	51,818	98.53%	
	Scattering	771	1.47%	
Total votes		52,589	100.0%	

Wisconsin Court of Appeals District I Election, 2023
Party	Candidate	Votes	%	±%
General Election, April 4, 2023
Nonpartisan	Sara Geenen	130,030	68.18%	
Nonpartisan	Bill Brash (incumbent)	59,587	31.25%	
N/a	Scattering	1,088	0.57%	
Plurality		70,443	36.94%	
Total votes		190,705	100.0%	-1.35%

Legal offices
Preceded by Stanley A. Miller	Wisconsin Circuit Court Judge for the Milwaukee Circuit, Branch 21; 2001–2015	Succeeded by Cynthia M. Davis
Preceded by Rebecca Bradley	Judge of the Wisconsin Court of Appeals District I 2015–2023	Succeeded by Sara Geenen
Preceded by Lisa S. Neubauer	Chief Judge of the Wisconsin Court of Appeals; 2021–2023	Succeeded by Maxine Aldridge White
