= Mark Mangerson =

American judge (1948–2020)

Judge of the Wisconsin Court of Appeals District III
- In office December 16, 2011 – July 31, 2014
- Appointed by: Scott Walker
- Preceded by: Edward R. Brunner
- Succeeded by: Thomas Hruz

Wisconsin Circuit Court Judge for the Oneida Circuit, Branch 2
- In office August 1, 1988 – December 16, 2011
- Preceded by: Branch established
- Succeeded by: Michael H. Bloom

District Attorney of Oneida County, Wisconsin
- In office June 30, 1976 – April 30, 1979
- Appointed by: Patrick Lucey
- Preceded by: Robert Kinney
- Succeeded by: John Hogan

District Attorney of Vilas County, Wisconsin
- In office November 1975 – June 30, 1976 (acting until Jan. 20, 1976)
- Appointed by: Patrick Lucey
- Preceded by: James Mason
- Succeeded by: Timothy Vocke

Personal details
- Born: December 26, 1948 Rhinelander, Wisconsin, U.S.
- Died: September 25, 2020 (aged 71) Rhinelander, Wisconsin, U.S.
- Resting place: Forest Home Cemetery, Rhinelander, Wisconsin
- Party: Democratic
- Spouse: Beverly Butzin
- Children: 4
- Education: Valparaiso University (B.A., J.D.)
- Profession: Lawyer, judge

Mark A. Mangerson (December 26, 1948 – September 25, 2020) was an American lawyer and judge from Oneida County, Wisconsin. He served three years as a judge of the Wisconsin Court of Appeals, from his appointment in December 2011 until his retirement on July 31, 2014, serving in the vast northern Wisconsin District III region. Before his appointment to the Court of Appeals, he served 23 years as a Wisconsin circuit court judge in Oneida County, and earlier served as district attorney of Vilas and Oneida counties.

== Biography ==
Mark Mangerson was born and raised in Rhinelander, Wisconsin, graduating from Rhinelander High School in 1967. He went on to attend Valparaiso University, where he earned his bachelor's degree in 1971 and his J.D. in 1974.

Mangerson returned to Wisconsin and was hired as an assistant district attorney in Vilas County, Wisconsin, in August 1974. After a year in that role, the district attorney, James Mason, resigned his office, and Mangerson began serving as acting district attorney. On January 20, 1976, Governor Patrick Lucey formally appointed Mangerson to serve out the remainder of Mason's term as district attorney.

Just six months later, however, Lucey appointed Mangerson as district attorney of neighboring Oneida County. In the fall 1976 election, Mangerson sought election to a full term as district attorney, running on the Democratic Party ticket; he won the November 1976 general election by a significant margin, and was re-elected without opposition in 1978. Shortly after winning re-election, however, Mangerson resigned from the district attorney's office to join a regional law firm. During his years in private legal practice, Mangerson served several times as special prosecutor in Vilas and Oneida counties when the district attorney was conflicted.

In 1987, the Wisconsin Legislature added new Wisconsin circuit court seats, including a new branch in Oneida County. Mangerson declared that he would run for the new judicial seat, and faced a race against John Hogan, who had succeeded him as district attorney. Mangerson ultimately prevailed in the April 1988 election, taking about 60% of the vote. He went on to win re-election three times, serving 23 years as circuit court judge.

In 2011, Wisconsin Court of Appeals judge Edward R. Brunner resigned his seat. Governor Scott Walker appointed Mangerson to succeed him. He was elected to a full term in April 2012, but retired just two years later, in July 2014. During his judicial career, he was active in state judicial organizations, including the Wisconsin Judicial Conference and the Wisconsin Judicial College

Mangerson died on September 25, 2020.

Legal offices
Preceded by James Mason	District Attorney of Vilas County, Wisconsin; November 1975 – June 30, 1976 (acting until January 20, 1976)	Succeeded by Timothy Vocke
Preceded by Robert Kinney	District Attorney of Oneida County, Wisconsin; June 30, 1976 – April 30, 1979	Succeeded by John Hogan
Branch established	Wisconsin Circuit Court Judge for the Oneida Circuit, Branch 2 August 1, 1988 – December 16, 2011	Succeeded by Michael H. Bloom
Preceded by Edward R. Brunner	Judge of the Wisconsin Court of Appeals District III; December 16, 2011 – July 31, 2014	Succeeded by Thomas Hruz
