= Patience D. Roggensack =

American judge (born 1940)

Pat Roggensack
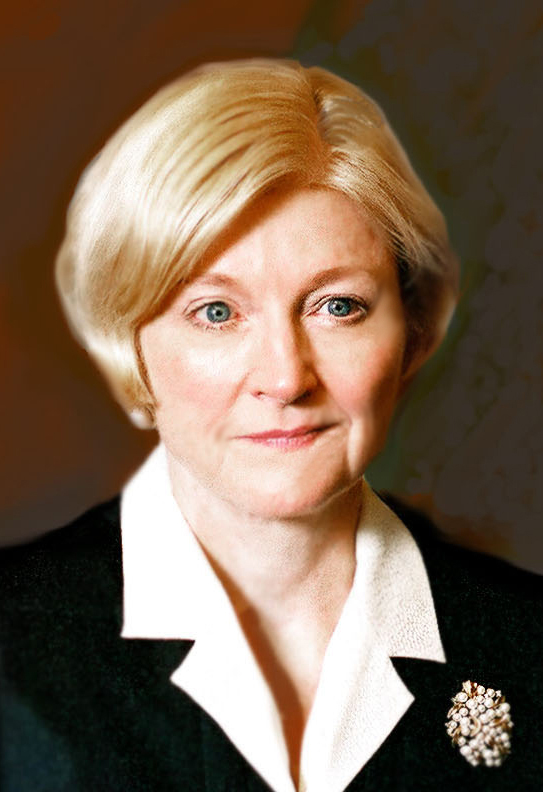
- Roggensack in 2005

26th Chief Justice of the Wisconsin Supreme Court
- In office April 29, 2015 – April 30, 2021
- Preceded by: Shirley Abrahamson
- Succeeded by: Annette Ziegler

Justice of the Wisconsin Supreme Court
- In office August 1, 2003 – July 31, 2023
- Preceded by: William A. Bablitch
- Succeeded by: Janet Protasiewicz

Judge of the Wisconsin Court of Appeals District IV
- In office August 1, 1996 – July 31, 2003
- Preceded by: Paul C. Gartzke
- Succeeded by: Paul B. Higginbotham

Personal details
- Born: Patience Drake; July 7, 1940 (age 86) Joliet, Illinois, U.S.
- Spouse: George Roggensack
- Children: 3
- Education: Drake University (BA); University of Wisconsin, Madison (JD)

Patience Drake Roggensack (née Drake; born July 7, 1940) is a retired American attorney and jurist. She served as the 26th chief justice of the Wisconsin Supreme Court from 2015 to 2021. Concurrently, she served for 20 years on the high court, from 2003 through 2023.

== Early life and career ==
Patience Drake was born in Joliet, Illinois. She graduated from Lockport Township High School in Lockport, Illinois; she then received her bachelor's degree from Drake University in 1962. After this, she worked at several universities as a research assistant before attending the University of Wisconsin Law School, where she graduated with a Juris Doctor degree in 1980.

After graduating law school, Roggensack practiced law in Madison, Wisconsin, for 16 years. This included work at the firm of DeWitt Ross & Stevens S.C., where she served as co-chairwoman of the litigation section.

== Judicial career ==
In 1995, Roggensack unsuccessfully ran for the Wisconsin Supreme Court.

In 1996, Roggensack was elected to the Wisconsin Court of Appeals, narrowly defeating Milwaukee attorney Erica Eisinger in the spring general election for a seat being vacated by outgoing justice Paul C. Gartzke. The victory was narrow, coming after a heated race. Roggensack lost in Dane County, but won in the other counties in the district (aided by effective television advertisements run by her campaign). She served seven years on the Court of Appeals District IV, which was composed of most of central and southwestern Wisconsin, being reelected in 2002 without opposition.

Roggensack was elected to the Wisconsin Supreme Court in 2003, defeating Barron County Circuit Court Judge Edward R. Brunner.

Roggensack was elected Chief Justice of the Wisconsin Supreme Court by her peers on April 29, 2015, following the certification of votes from the April 2015 election. Voters approved an amendment to the state constitution that changed the way the chief justice of the Supreme Court was selected. Previously, the justice with the most seniority held the position, but the amendment allowed court members to choose the chief justice.

Following the justices' election of Roggensack as chief justice, former Chief Justice Shirley Abrahamson filed a federal lawsuit challenging the implementation of the constitutional amendment, which was heard on May 15, 2015. Five of the seven justices asked the federal judge to dismiss Abrahamson's lawsuit. On May 15, 2015, the federal court denied Abrahamson's request for immediate reinstatement as chief justice. U.S. District Judge James D. Peterson determined there was no harm in Roggensack serving as chief justice while Abrahamson's lawsuit continued.

Justice Roggensack ultimately relinquished the job of chief justice in April 2021, backing the election of Justice Annette Ziegler as the 27th Chief Justice of the Wisconsin Supreme Court.

In June 2021, the Wisconsin Supreme Court rejected a ban on absentee-ballot drop boxes. Roggensack dissented from the majority, voting to uphold the ban on absentee-ballot drop boxes, arguing there was a need for "judicial resolution by the Wisconsin Supreme Court before the 2022 elections begin."

=== COVID-19 stay-at-home controversy ===
On May 5, 2020, during oral arguments in Wisconsin's stay-at-home order case, which challenges the extension of statewide business and school closures due to the outbreak of COVID-19, Roggensack challenged the idea that the outbreak was community-wide and could be replicated elsewhere. Arguing that the most recent increase in COVID cases mainly reflected an isolated outbreak at one JBS meatpacking facility in the Green Bay area, she commented, "Due to the meatpacking, though, that's where Brown County got the flare. It wasn't just the regular folks in Brown County.”

A challenge to acting Wisconsin health secretary Andrea Palm's extension of statewide business and school closures, filed by Senate Majority Leader Scott L. Fitzgerald and House Speaker Robin Vos, Roggensack's comments sparked political criticism from Democratic lawmakers and labor union leaders, labeling her use of the term “regular folks” elitist, classist, and racist.

Precluded from commenting outside of court on cases pending judgement, Roggensack was unable to respond. Defending her statement, Rick Esenberg, President of the Wisconsin Institute for Law and Liberty, said that by "regular folks" Roggensack meant the general population of Brown County.

On May 13, 2020, the Supreme Court declared the stay-at-home order "unlawful, invalid, and unenforceable." In her majority opinion, Roggensack stated DHS Secretary Andrea Palm had no authority to enact the order.

=== Retirement and 2023 election ===
Roggensack announced she would not run for re-election in 2023, and would retire at the end of her present term, which expired on July 31, 2023. Before the nonpartisan primary in the 2023 Wisconsin Supreme Court election, Roggensack endorsed Waukesha County circuit judge Jennifer Dorow. After Dorow was eliminated in the primary, Roggensack declined to endorse the only remaining conservative candidate in the race—former Wisconsin Supreme Court justice Daniel Kelly. Eight days before the April general election, Roggensack's daughter, Milwaukee County circuit judge Ellen Brostrom, wrote an article in the Milwaukee Journal Sentinel declaring that Kelly was unfit to serve on the court and encouraging support for Kelly's liberal opponent, Janet Protasiewicz.

== Personal life and family ==
Roggensack's daughter, Ellen Brostrom, formerly served as a circuit court judge in Milwaukee County.

== Electoral history ==
=== Wisconsin Supreme Court (1995) ===
1995 Wisconsin Supreme Court election
Party	Candidate	Votes	%	±%
Primary Election, February 21, 1995
Nonpartisan	Ann Walsh Bradley	131,889	38.85%	
Nonpartisan	N. Patrick Crooks	88,913	26.19%	
Nonpartisan	Ted E. Wedemeyer Jr.	64,668	19.05%	
Nonpartisan	Patience D. Roggensack	41,303	12.16%	
Nonpartisan	William A. Pangman	12,753	3.76%	
Total votes		339,526	100.0%	
General Election, April 4, 1995
Nonpartisan	Ann Walsh Bradley	514,588	54.82%	
Nonpartisan	N. Patrick Crooks	424,110	45.18%	
Total votes		938,698	100.0%	

=== Wisconsin Appeals Court (1996, 2002) ===
Wisconsin Court of Appeals District IV Election, 1996
Party	Candidate	Votes	%	±%
Nonpartisan	Patience Roggensack	112,826	50.55%	
Nonpartisan	Erica Eisinger	110,376	49.45%	
Total votes		223,202	100.0%	

Wisconsin Court of Appeals District IV Election, 2002
Party	Candidate	Votes	%	±%
Nonpartisan	Patience Roggensack (incumbent)	134,900	99.35%	
	Write-ins	883	0.65%	
Total votes		135,783	100.0%	

=== Wisconsin Supreme Court (2003, 2013) ===
2003 Wisconsin Supreme Court election
Party	Candidate	Votes	%	±%
Primary Election, February 19, 2003
Nonpartisan	Patience Roggensack	109,501	39.36%	
Nonpartisan	Edward R. Brunner	89,494	32.17%	
Nonpartisan	Paul B. Higginbotham	77,584	27.89%	
	Write-ins	1,604	0.58%	
Total votes		278,183	100.0%	
General Election, April 1, 2003
Nonpartisan	Patience Roggensack	409,422	51.13%	
Nonpartisan	Edward R. Brunner	390,215	48.73%	
	Write-ins	1,148	0.14%	
Total votes		800,785	100.0%	

2013 Wisconsin Supreme Court election
Party	Candidate	Votes	%	±%
Primary Election, February 19, 2013
Nonpartisan	Patience Roggensack (incumbent)	231,822	63.74%	
Nonpartisan	Edward Fallone	108,490	29.83%	
Nonpartisan	Vince Megna	22,391	6.16%	
	Write-ins	972	0.27%	
Total votes		363,675	100.0%	
General Election, April 2, 2013
Nonpartisan	Patience Roggensack (incumbent)	491,261	57.48%	
Nonpartisan	Edward Fallone	362,969	42.47%	
	Write-ins	485	0.06%	
Total votes		854,715	100.0%	

== Sources ==
- 'Safer at Home' questions, challenges persist as Wisconsin awaits court ruling
- Chief justice: COVID-19 spread at meatpacking plant not affecting 'regular folks'

Legal offices
Preceded by William A. Bablitch	Justice of the Wisconsin Supreme Court; 2003–2023	Succeeded by Janet Protasiewicz
Preceded by Shirley Abrahamson	Chief Justice of the Wisconsin Supreme Court; 2015–2021	Succeeded by Annette Ziegler
