= Gregory A. Peterson =

Retired American judge (born 1946)

The Honorable Gregory A. Peterson

Judge of the Wisconsin Court of Appeals District III
- In office August 1, 1999 – November 30, 2012
- Preceded by: Gordon Myse
- Succeeded by: Lisa K. Stark

Chief Judge of the 10th District of Wisconsin Circuit Courts
- In office August 1, 1996 – July 31, 1999
- Preceded by: Thomas J. Gallagher
- Succeeded by: Edward R. Brunner

Wisconsin Circuit Court Judge for the Eau Claire Circuit, Branch 3
- In office July 29, 1983 – July 31, 1999
- Appointed by: Tony Earl
- Preceded by: Karl F. Peplau
- Succeeded by: William M. Gabler Sr.

Personal details
- Born: August 24, 1946 (age 79) Minneapolis, Minnesota
- Party: Democratic
- Parent: Donald O. Peterson (father)
- Education: University of Wisconsin–Madison; University of Wisconsin Law School

Gregory A. Peterson (born August 24, 1946) is an American lawyer and retired judge. He served 13 years as a judge of the Wisconsin Court of Appeals in the Wausau-based District III court. Before that, he was a Wisconsin Circuit Court Judge in Eau Claire County for 16 years, including three years as Chief Judge of the 10th Judicial Administrative District of Wisconsin Circuit Courts. Since his retirement, he continues to serve as a reserve judge and arbitrator in the state court system.

== Early life and education ==
Peterson was born on August 24, 1946, in Minneapolis, Minnesota. He attended the University of Wisconsin-Eau Claire, University of Wisconsin-Madison, and University of Iowa. He earned his J.D. degree from University of Wisconsin Law School in 1973.

== Career ==
After graduating from law school, Peterson worked as a lawyer in private practice in Eau Claire, Wisconsin, and was active in the state legal community. He participated for many years in the Wisconsin Academy of Trial Lawyers and chaired medical malpractice panels. He also briefly stepped in as assistant corporation counsel for Eau Claire County. In addition to his legal career, Peterson worked part time as a member of the faculty of the University of Wisconsin-Eau Claire from 1976 to 1978 and then served as a court commissioner from 1978 until his appointment to the judiciary.

In 1983, Wisconsin Circuit Court Judge Karl Peplau announced his intention to resign later that year. Peterson was one of several local lawyers and politicians to signify their interest in the seat. After a selection process, new Governor Tony Earl selected Peterson for the seat. He was subsequently elected to a full term without opposition in 1984, and re-elected in 1990 and 1996. In the spring of 1996, the Wisconsin Supreme Court selected Judge Peterson to serve as Chief Judge for the 10th Judicial Administrative District, at the time composed of thirteen northwestern Wisconsin counties. He was selected for another two-year term in 1998, but vacated the position in 1999 after he was elected to the Court of Appeals.

In 1998, incumbent Wisconsin Court of Appeals Judge Gordon Myse announced he would not seek another term on the court in 1999. Shortly after, Judge Peterson announced he would be a candidate for the seat. Ultimately, he was not opposed in the 1999 election and went on to re-election in 2005 and 2011, also without opposition.

== Reserve judge ==
He stepped down from the court in 2012 but remained active as a reserve judge. One of his most noteworthy cases after retirement was his involvement in the John Doe investigation of Governor Scott Walker for illegal campaign coordination with conservative political action committees. Judge Peterson was assigned to the case by Chief Justice Shirley Abrahamson in 2013 after the recusal of reserve judge Barbara Kluka. In January 2014, Judge Peterson made the consequential decision to void several subpoenas granted by Kluka, ruling that it was not clear that the coordination alleged by the prosecutor constituted an actual crime. Although Peterson stayed his ruling pending appeal, the decision effectively stalled the investigation until after the 2014 gubernatorial election, where Walker narrowly won re-election. After the election, the appeals reached the Wisconsin Supreme Court, which ruled along party lines to uphold Judge Peterson's ruling and ended the probe.

== Personal life and family ==
Peterson's father, Donald Peterson, was a prominent leader in the Democratic Party of Wisconsin in the 1960s and 70s. He led the state's delegation to the 1968 Democratic National Convention in Chicago, where he supported anti-war candidate Eugene McCarthy and joined protests taking place outside the venue. Donald Peterson later ran in the Democratic primary for the 1970 Wisconsin gubernatorial election, but was defeated by the eventual winner Patrick Lucey.

Legal offices
Preceded by Karl F. Peplau	Wisconsin Circuit Court Judge for the Eau Claire Circuit, Branch 3 August 1, 1983 – July 31, 1999	Succeeded by William M. Gabler Sr.
Preceded by Thomas J. Gallagher	Chief Judge of the 10th District of Wisconsin Circuit Courts; August 1, 1996 – July 31, 1999	Succeeded by Edward R. Brunner
Preceded by Gordon Myse	Judge of the Wisconsin Court of Appeals District III; August 1, 1999 – November 30, 2012	Succeeded by Lisa K. Stark
