= Thomas Hruz =

American judge (born 1973)

Thomas M. Hruz

Judge of the Wisconsin Court of Appeals District III
- Incumbent
- Assumed office August 1, 2014
- Appointed by: Scott Walker
- Preceded by: Mark Mangerson

Personal details
- Born: Thomas Michael Hruz; November 2, 1973 (age 52) Milwaukee, Wisconsin, U.S.
- Spouse: Kelly
- Education: University of Wisconsin–Milwaukee (BA); University of Wisconsin–Madison (MA); Marquette Law School (JD)

Thomas Michael Hruz (/ruːz/ ROOZ; born November 2, 1973) is an American lawyer and jurist, serving as a judge of the Wisconsin Court of Appeals in the Wausau-based District III. He was appointed in 2014 by former Governor Scott Walker.

== Early life and education ==
Born in Milwaukee, Wisconsin, Hruz received his bachelor's degree from University of Wisconsin–Milwaukee in 1995, and immediately went on to obtain his master's degree in Public Affairs and Public Policy Analysis from the Robert M. La Follette School of Public Affairs at the University of Wisconsin–Madison in 1997. Shortly thereafter, he attended law school at the Marquette University Law School, earning his Juris Doctor in 2002. At Marquette, he was a writer and editor for the Marquette Law Review, and received the 2002 Golden Quill Award for best student writing.

== Legal career ==
After graduating from law school, he was selected as a law clerk for Wisconsin Supreme Court justice David Prosser Jr. for the 2002–2003 term. Following his time with Justice Prosser, he was selected as a clerk for Judge John Louis Coffey on the U.S. Seventh Circuit Court of Appeals.

Hruz was hired as an associate at the Milwaukee law firm Meissner Tierney Fisher & Nichols, S.C., and, in 2009, was made a partner. At the firm, Hruz was a leader in their appellate practice. Hruz was recognized as a "Super Lawyer" in the appellate practice and an "Up and Coming" attorney by the Wisconsin Law Journal. Hruz was also an active member of the board of the appellate practice section of the State Bar of Wisconsin between 2009 and 2015, and was chair for the 2013–2014 term.

In addition to his involvement with the State Bar, Hruz has been involved with the legal profession through academic and organizational service.

In 2012, he began teaching at Marquette University Law School as adjunct professor of Appellate Writing and Advocacy.

In volunteer positions, Hruz has participated in expanding access to the civil justice system for people of limited means. After serving on the Board of Directors of the Wisconsin Trust Account Foundation, the state's Interest on Lawyer Trust Accounts administrator, the Foundation appointed Hruz to the Wisconsin Access to Justice Commission, on which he continues to serve.

Hruz has been an active member of several legal professional associations. He is a member of the Thomas E. Fairchild Inn of Court, the Hon. Robert J. Parins Legal Society of Northeast Wisconsin, and the Federalist Society, and was president of the St. Thomas More Lawyers Society of Milwaukee.

== Judicial career ==
Following the retirement of Judge Mark Mangerson, Governor Scott Walker appointed Hruz to the Wisconsin Court of Appeals District III on July 21, 2014. His appointment was strongly endorsed by colleagues at the Marquette Law School and his former boss, Justice Prosser. His term began August 1, 2014, and he was subsequently elected to a full six-year term without opposition in 2016. He was one of three finalists considered by Governor Walker to replace Justice Prosser, who retired in 2016, but the selection ultimately went to Daniel Kelly, a longtime member of Governor Walker's legal team.

Since August 2023, Hruz is also a member of the Wisconsin Judicial Commission, which investigates allegations of misconduct or impairment in the Wisconsin judiciary.

== Personal life and family ==
Hruz is married and resides in Grand Chute, Wisconsin. He has been a board member of the National Alliance for the Mentally Ill Greater Milwaukee.

Prior to his judicial service, Hruz was a small dollar donor to Governor Walker, conservative Wisconsin Supreme Court Justice Rebecca Bradley, and the Republican Party of Wisconsin.

Legal offices
Preceded by Mark Mangerson	Judge of the Wisconsin Court of Appeals District III; August 1, 2014 – present	Incumbent
