= Karl J. Goethel =

American lawyer and politician

Karl J. Goethel (April 7, 1930 – February 23, 1996) was an American lawyer and politician.

Born in Eau Claire, Wisconsin, Goethel served in the United States Army during the Korean War. He received his bachelor's degree in economics from the University of Notre Dame in 1952 and then his law degree from Notre Dame Law School in 1957. He then practiced law. He served in the Wisconsin State Assembly in 1959 as a Democrat. In 1964, he was elected District Attorney for Pepin County, Wisconsin. He died in Durand, Wisconsin on February 23, 1996.
