= Paul B. Higginbotham =

Retired American judge (born 1954)

The Honorable Paul B. Higginbotham

Judge of the Wisconsin Court of Appeals District IV
- In office September 1, 2003 – July 31, 2017
- Appointed by: Jim Doyle
- Preceded by: Patience D. Roggensack
- Succeeded by: Michael R. Fitzpatrick

Wisconsin Circuit Court Judge for the Dane Circuit, Branch 17
- In office August 1, 1994 – September 1, 2003
- Preceded by: Position Established
- Succeeded by: James L. Martin

Personal details
- Born: October 14, 1953 (age 72) Philadelphia, Pennsylvania
- Education: University of Wisconsin (B.A.); University of Wisconsin Law School (J.D.)

Paul B. Higginbotham (born October 14, 1954) is a retired judge of the Wisconsin Court of Appeals. He was the first African American to serve on the court. He previously served nine years as a Wisconsin circuit court judge in Dane County, Wisconsin.

== Biography ==
Higginbotham was born on October 14, 1954, in Philadelphia, Pennsylvania. His father was a civil rights activist and marched with Martin Luther King Jr., during the March on Washington for Jobs and Freedom. He is a graduate of the University of Wisconsin–Madison and the University of Wisconsin Law School and is a resident of Fitchburg, Wisconsin. Though the judicial offices held were officially non-partisan, he is a Democrat.

== Career ==
From 1985 to 1986, Higginbotham was an attorney with the Legal Aid Society of Milwaukee, Wisconsin. He was later a member of the faculty of the University of Wisconsin Law School. From 1992 to 1993, he served as City of Madison, Wisconsin Municipal Judge. He was the a Wisconsin Circuit Court Judge from 1994 until joining the Court of Appeals in 2003. That year he ran for election to the Wisconsin Supreme Court, but was defeated in the February primary election with the seat ultimately going to Patience D. Roggensack. Judge Roggensack's elevation created a vacancy on the Wisconsin Court of Appeals, and Governor Jim Doyle appointed Judge Higginbotham to the empty seat. Judge Higginbotham won re-election without opposition in 2005 and 2011. In May 2016, Higginbotham announced that he would not seek re-election to the Wisconsin Court of Appeals in the 2017 Wisconsin Spring Election.

== Redistricting commission ==
After a 2011 redistricting law, passed by a partisan Republican legislature and signed by a Republican governor, Wisconsin became one of the worst gerrymandered states in the country. In July 2020, Wisconsin Governor Tony Evers announced the creation of a redistricting commission in an effort to create a nonpartisan alternative to the contentious process that had resulted in years of legal challenges and disputes. Evers appointed Judge Higginbotham, along with retired judges Janine P. Geske and Joseph Troy, as a panel to select the members of the proposed redistricting commission.

== Electoral history ==
=== Wisconsin Circuit Court (1994, 2000) ===
Wisconsin Circuit Court, Dane Circuit, Branch 17 Election, 1994
Party	Candidate	Votes	%	±%
General Election, April 5, 1994
Nonpartisan	Paul B. Higginbotham	35,864	73.86%	
Nonpartisan	Hamdy Ezalarab	12,691	26.14%	
Total votes		'48,555'	'100.0%'	

Wisconsin Circuit Court, Dane Circuit, Branch 17 Election, 2000
Party	Candidate	Votes	%	±%
General Election, April 4, 2000
Nonpartisan	Paul B. Higginbotham (incumbent)	49,239	100.0%	
Total votes		'49,239'	'100.0%'	

=== Wisconsin Supreme Court (2003) ===
Wisconsin Supreme Court Election, 2003
Party	Candidate	Votes	%	±%
Primary Election, February 18, 2003
Nonpartisan	Patience D. Roggensack	109,501	39.36%	
Nonpartisan	Edward R. Brunner	89,494	32.17%	
Nonpartisan	Paul B. Higginbotham	77,584	27.89%	
	Scattering	1,604	0.58%	
Total votes		'278,183'	'100.0%'	
General Election, April 1, 2003
Nonpartisan	Patience D. Roggensack	409,422	51.13%	
Nonpartisan	Edward R. Brunner	390,215	48.73%	
	Scattering	1,148	0.14%	
Total votes		'800,785'	'100.0%'	

=== Wisconsin Court of Appeals (2005, 2011) ===
Wisconsin Court of Appeals District IV Election, 2005
Party	Candidate	Votes	%	±%
General Election, April 5, 2005
Nonpartisan	Paul B. Higginbotham (incumbent)	165,592	99.68%	
	Scattering	527	0.32%	
Total votes		'166,119'	'100.0%'	

Wisconsin Court of Appeals District IV Election, 2011
Party	Candidate	Votes	%	±%
General Election, April 5, 2011
Nonpartisan	Paul B. Higginbotham (incumbent)	316,583	99.44%	
	Scattering	1,795	0.56%	
Total votes		'318,378'	'100.0%'	

== See also ==
- List of African-American jurists
- List of first minority male lawyers and judges in Wisconsin

Legal offices
Preceded by New branch	Wisconsin Circuit Court Judge for the Dane Circuit, Branch 17; 1994 – 2003	Succeeded by James L. Martin
Preceded by Patience D. Roggensack	Judge of the Wisconsin Court of Appeals District IV; 2003 – 2017	Succeeded by Michael R. Fitzpatrick
