= Edward R. Brunner =

American judge (born 1953)

The Honorable Edward R. Brunner

Judge of the Wisconsin Court of Appeals District III
- In office August 1, 2007 – September 6, 2011
- Preceded by: Gregory A. Peterson
- Succeeded by: Mark Mangerson

Chief Judge of the 10th District of Wisconsin Circuit Courts
- In office August 1, 1999 – July 31, 2005
- Preceded by: Gregory A. Peterson
- Succeeded by: Benjamin Proctor

Wisconsin Circuit Court Judge for the Barron Circuit, Branch 2
- In office August 1, 1988 – July 31, 2007
- Preceded by: Position established
- Succeeded by: Timothy M. Doyle

Personal details
- Born: 1953 (age 72–73) Akron, Ohio
- Spouse: Linda Stariha Brunner
- Children: Jason; Alexis
- Education: Marquette University (B.A.); University of Akron School of Law (J.D.)
- Profession: lawyer, judge

Edward R. Brunner (born 1953) is an American lawyer and retired judge. He was a judge of the Wisconsin Court of Appeals from 2007 through 2011 in the Wausau-based District III. Previously, he was a Wisconsin Circuit Court Judge for 19 years, and was Chief Judge of the 10th District of Wisconsin Circuit Courts from 1999 through 2005.

== Biography ==
A resident of Rice Lake, Wisconsin, Brunner is a graduate of Marquette University and the University of Akron School of Law. Additionally, he trained as an emergency medical technician at Wisconsin Indianhead Technical College. He is married with two children.

== Early career ==
Brunner began his legal career working for the Juvenile Delinquency Prevention Services, under the Office of Justice Programs in the United States Department of Justice—Brunner was Assistant Regional Administrator in the Akron, Ohio, office. From 1974 until 1977, he was executive director of Youth Services in Lorain, Ohio. In 1977, he moved to Wisconsin and was hired as corporation counsel for the Department of Human Services in Barron County, Wisconsin, where he served until 1979. He worked as an attorney in the private sector for the next decade, and served as City attorney for Rice Lake.

== Judicial career ==
Brunner was elected Wisconsin Circuit Court Judge for Barron County's newly created Branch 2 seat in 1988. He was re-elected in 1994, 2000, and 2006. In 1999 he was designated by the Wisconsin Supreme Court as Chief Judge of the 10th Judicial Administrative District and remained in that role until August 2005.

As Judge, Brunner was responsible for introducing restorative justice projects to Barron County in 1998, and was an advocate for statewide implementation.

He was a candidate for Wisconsin Supreme Court in 2003, but was defeated in the general election by future Chief Justice Patience D. Roggensack. Brunner was endorsed by former Governor Tony Earl and 178 Wisconsin circuit court judges, or 74% of the courts' judges. In 2007, he was elected without opposition to the Wisconsin Court of Appeals. He didn't serve his whole term, resigning in September 2011.

== Awards and works ==
In 2006, he was awarded the 2005 Lifetime Jurist Achievement Award from the State Bar of Wisconsin. The same year, he received the William H. Rehnquist Award for Judicial Excellence from the Supreme Court of the United States, one of the most prestigious judicial awards in the country.

== Electoral history ==
=== Wisconsin Circuit Court (1988, 1994, 2000) ===
Wisconsin Circuit Court, Barron Circuit, Branch 2 Election, 1988
Party	Candidate	Votes	%	±%
Primary Election, February 16, 1988
Nonpartisan	Edward R. Brunner	2,354	39.78%	
Nonpartisan	Edward J. Coe	1,798	30.38%	
Nonpartisan	David Cusick	1,006	17.00%	
Nonpartisan	Mark O. Dobberpuhl	760	12.84%	
Total votes		'5,918'	'100.0%'	
General Election, April 5, 1988
Nonpartisan	Edward R. Brunner	6,139	53.69%	
Nonpartisan	Edward J. Coe	5,295	46.31%	
Total votes		'11,434'	'100.0%'	

Wisconsin Circuit Court, Barron Circuit, Branch 2 Election, 1994
Party	Candidate	Votes	%	±%
General Election, April 5, 1994
Nonpartisan	Edward R. Brunner (incumbent)	5,527	100.0%	
Total votes		'5,527'	'100.0%'	

Wisconsin Circuit Court, Barron Circuit, Branch 2 Election, 2000
Party	Candidate	Votes	%	±%
General Election, April 4, 2000
Nonpartisan	Edward R. Brunner (incumbent)	5,541	100.0%	
Total votes		'5,541'	'100.0%'	

=== Wisconsin Supreme Court (2003) ===
Wisconsin Supreme Court Election, 2003
Party	Candidate	Votes	%	±%
Primary Election, February 18, 2003
Nonpartisan	Patience D. Roggensack	109,501	39.36%	
Nonpartisan	Edward R. Brunner	89,494	32.17%	
Nonpartisan	Paul B. Higginbotham	77,584	27.89%	
	Scattering	1,604	0.58%	
Total votes		'278,183'	'100.0%'	
General Election, April 1, 2003
Nonpartisan	Patience D. Roggensack	409,422	51.13%	
Nonpartisan	Edward R. Brunner	390,215	48.73%	
	Scattering	1,148	0.14%	
Total votes		'800,785'	'100.0%'	

=== Wisconsin Circuit Court (2006) ===
Wisconsin Circuit Court, Barron Circuit, Branch 2 Election, 2006
Party	Candidate	Votes	%	±%
General Election, April 4, 2006
Nonpartisan	Edward R. Brunner (incumbent)	4,383	100.0%	
Total votes		'4,383'	'100.0%'	

=== Wisconsin Appeals Court (2007) ===
Wisconsin Court of Appeals District III Election, 2007
Party	Candidate	Votes	%	±%
General Election, April 3, 2007
Nonpartisan	Edward R. Brunner	172,834	99.69%	
	Scattering	538	0.31%	
Total votes		'173,372'	'100.0%'	

Legal offices
Preceded by New branch	Wisconsin Circuit Court Judge for the Barron Circuit, Branch 2; 1988 – 2007	Succeeded by Timothy M. Doyle
Preceded by Gregory A. Peterson	Chief Judge of the 10th District of Wisconsin Circuit Courts; 1999 – 2005	Succeeded by Benjamin Proctor
Preceded by Gregory A. Peterson	Judge of the Wisconsin Court of Appeals District III; 2007 – 2011	Succeeded by Mark Mangerson
