= Vince Megna =

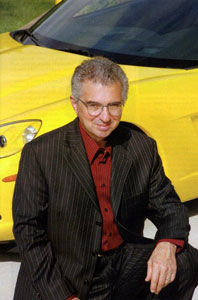
- Born: August 24, 1944 (age 82); Iron Mountain, Michigan, U.S.
- Education: Marquette University Law School (JD)
- Occupations: Attorney, author, musician
- Years active: 1960s–present
- Known for: Consumer advocacy, "lemon law" litigation
- Notable work: Bring on Goliath: Lemon Law Justice in America (2003)

Vince Megna (born August 24, 1944, in Iron Mountain, Michigan) is a Wisconsin attorney best known for representing consumers in 'lemon law' suits against motor vehicle manufacturers. Lemon laws are a type of consumer protection legislation that offers recourse to buyers of motor vehicles with recurring mechanical or other problems that are not resolved within a reasonable time by the dealer or manufacturer.

== Legal career ==
Megna graduated from Marquette University Law School in 1973. He has successfully represented consumers in more than 1,500 Lemon Law cases, won some of the biggest jury verdicts and lemon law settlements in the nation and has argued before both the Wisconsin Supreme Court and Court of Appeals. In 2003, Lawyers Weekly USA selected Megna one of the ten "Lawyers of the Year" for his work in consumer advocacy. In 2006, Megna prevailed in one of the largest Lemon Law verdicts in the nation, a $385,000 judgment against DaimlerChrysler Corporation over a defective Dodge Viper. In 2010, in a case that received worldwide media coverage, Megna obtained a $482,000 judgment against Mercedes-Benz for a $56,000 E class that wouldn't start.

In 2003, Megna released Bring on Goliath: Lemon Law Justice in America (Ken Press, Tucson, AZ). Ed Henry, retired Automotive Editor for Kiplinger's Personal Finance, critiqued the work as, exposing "a greedy grab for profits at the expense of consumers like none I have read in more than 20 years of automotive reporting". Warren Brown of The Washington Post called Bring on Goliath, "simply the best book I have ever read on consumer justice in the matter of gaining compensation for cars that just don't work." Academy Award winner and author Michael Moore gave Bring on Goliath a "thumbs up." The book inspired efforts in Hawaii to change its lemon law (HI HB 1753) into a more consumer friendly law identical to that of Wisconsin. The bill was strenuously opposed by the Hawaii Automobile Dealers Association.

In 2006, the satirical and irreverent rant on society, religion, truth and the legal profession was published in Vince Megna's second book Lap Dancers Don't Take Checks: The Truth about Law, Lawyers and other Trivialities (Ken Press). Johnny Dark, the oldest CBS page from the Late Show with David Letterman, wrote the foreword.

=== Campaign for Supreme Court of Wisconsin ===
In 2013, Mr. Megna ran for a ten-year term on the Wisconsin Supreme Court against incumbent Patience D. Roggensack and Ed Fallone. In Wisconsin all judicial races are non-partisan.

Wisconsin Supreme Court Primary Election, 2013
Candidate	Votes	%
Patience D. Roggensack	231,822	63.74%
Ed Fallone	108,490	29.83%
Vince Megna	22,391	6.16%
Write-In	972	0.27%
Majority	—	100%

== Tesla Motors controversy ==
On April 9, 2014, when Tesla Motors released a statement regarding a suit filed against them from Megna. Tesla's statement claimed that Megna had filed suit because they ignored three demands for a buy-back from his client. Tesla, claiming only to have received one request in November 2013, as a prerequisite for pursuing the claim in Wisconsin.

Tesla went on to state,

"To give you a sense of our service relationship with this customer, it's worth considering our efforts to resolve two of his main complaints. One related to malfunctioning door handles. Even though our service team wasn't able to replicate the issue with the door handles as described, we replaced all the handles anyway. Despite the fix, the customer said the problem persisted. We were never able to reproduce the alleged malfunction but offered to inspect the car again and are still trying to do so.

Another issue was that the car's fuse blew on numerous occasions. Each time, our engineers explored all possible explanations and were never able to find anything wrong with the car. Still, just to be sure, we replaced several parts that could have been related to the alleged problem – all at no expense to the customer. When the fuse kept blowing despite the new parts, and faced with no diagnosis showing anything wrong with the car, the engineers were moved to consider the possibility that the fuse had been tampered with. After investigating, they determined that the car's front trunk had been opened immediately before the fuse failure on each of these occasions. (The fuse is accessed through the front trunk.) Ultimately, Tesla service applied non-tamper tape to the fuse switch. From that point on, the fuse performed flawlessly."

Tesla also noted that Vince Megna had entered a separate Lemon Law Suit against Volvo in February of the same year, with the same client.

Vince Megna posted a video about the lawsuit on April 7, 2014. In the video he states the first five months his client owned his Model S Tesla it was in the shop 66 days, additionally stating "an all electric vehicle, and the batteries won't charge". He also demonstrated that the automatic extruding door handles were intermittently malfunctioning. However, there was skepticism around his demonstration due to the indicator lights blinking right before the handle started working. Some have suggesting that he had locked the car, which prevented the handles from extruding, then unlocked it during his video when he wanted them to work, providing the illusion of intermittent malfunction. However it is uncertain whether or not the blinking was just a function of the car.

== Music career ==
Prior to becoming a lawyer, Megna sustained a modest musical career playing guitar with well-known performers, including Teddy Randazzo ("Goin' Out Of My Head" and "Hurt So Bad"), Bobby Hart, Tommy Boyce and Bobby Hart, accordion virtuoso Tommy Gumina and jazz guitar great Herb Ellis. He also performed in bands with Moby Grape founding member Peter Lewis, American icon blues bassist Larry Taylor and John Walker of The Walker Brothers. His work in music continued after joining the bar, including recordings with his own band, Vince and the Attorneys. In 2000, Megna released Truth is Irrelevant, a 10-song satirical, alternative rock CD produced by Genesis and Phil Collins' guitarist, Daryl Stuermer.

== Books by Vince Megna ==
- Bring on Goliath: Lemon Law Justice in America (Ken Press, 2003, ISBN 978-1-928771-16-6)
- Lap Dancers Don't Take Checks: The Truth about Law, Lawyers and other Trivialities (Ken Press, 2006, ISBN 978-1-928771-44-9)

== Discography ==
- 1962 Meet The Bonnevilles – The Bonnevilles (Drum Boy Records)
- 1965 "Poinciana" b/w "Red Vent" – (co-writer, "Red Vent") Herb Ellis and Vince Megna (EMP Records)
- 1979 "The Loneliest Night" b/w "Sometimes Love" – Bobby Hart (Warner/Curb Records)
- 1980 The First Bobby Hart Solo Album – Bobby Hart (WEA Records)
- 1980 "Lovers for the Night" b/w "You Get Smoke in Your Eyes" – Bobby Hart (Ariola Records)
- 1982 "IRSBS" b/w "Truth is Irrelevant in a Criminal Case" – The Attorneys (Verdict Records)
- 1984 Moby Grape '84 (co-writer, "Silver Wheels") – Moby Grape (San Francisco Sound Records)
- 1990 Vince & The Attorneys – Vince & The Attorneys (Verdict Records)
- 1995 Hung Jury – Vince & The Attorneys (Verdict Records)
- 2000 Truth is Irrelevant – Vince & The Attorneys (Urban Island Music)
- 2015 The First Bobby Hart Solo Album - CD (co-writer, "I'm Just Taking the Long Way Home") - Bobby Hart 7a Records
