= Charles P. Dykman =

American judge

Charles P. Dykman is a former Presiding Judge of the Wisconsin Court of Appeals.

== Career ==
Dykman was a Judge of the Court of Appeals from 1978 to 2010. He served as a Presiding Judge twice. First, from 1996 to 2001, and second, from 2009 to 2010. Previously, he had been an attorney in the private sector for more than decade. Since his retirement from public service, he has served on the faculty of the University of Wisconsin Law School.

== Education ==
- B.S. - University of Wisconsin-Madison
- LL.B. - University of Wisconsin Law School
