= Wisconsin Court of Appeals =

Appellate court in Wisconsin, US

Court of Appeals of Wisconsin
- Established: August 1978
- Jurisdiction: Wisconsin
- Location: Milwaukee (District I); Waukesha (District II); Wausau (District III); Madison (District IV)
- Composition method: Non-partisan election from within judicial district
- Authorised by: Wis. Const. Art VII § 5 Wis. Stats. Chapter 752
- Appeals to: Supreme Court of Wisconsin
- Appeals from: Wisconsin circuit courts
- Judge term length: Six years
- Number of positions: 16
- Website: www.wicourts.gov/courts/appeals/

Chief Judge
- Currently: Joe Donald
- Since: April 22, 2026

Deputy Chief Judge
- Currently: Rachel A. Graham
- Since: April 22, 2026

Division map
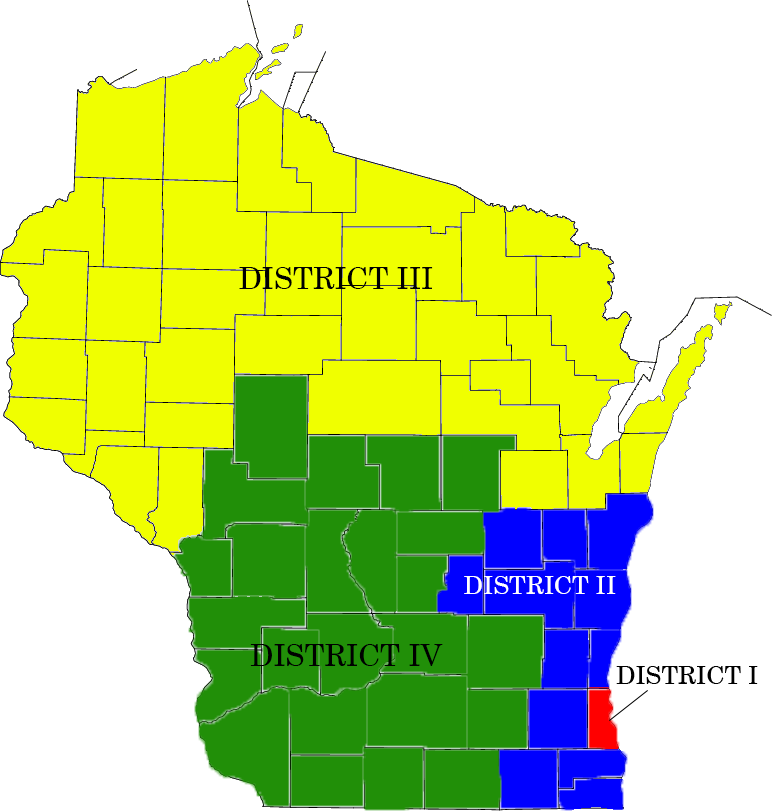

The Wisconsin Court of Appeals is an intermediate appellate court that reviews contested decisions of the Wisconsin circuit courts. The Court of Appeals was created in August 1978 to alleviate the Wisconsin Supreme Court's rising number of appellate cases. Published Court of Appeals opinions are considered binding precedent until overruled by the Supreme Court; unpublished opinions are not. The Court hears most appeals in three-judge panels, but appeals of circuit court decisions in misdemeanor, small claims, and municipal ordinance cases are decided by a single judge.

== Composition ==
The Court of Appeals comprises 16 judges elected to six-year terms in four geographic districts. Districts I and II have four judges each, three judges are chambered in District III, and five in District IV. The court is administered by a chief judge, appointed by the Wisconsin Supreme Court, who is assisted by a deputy chief judge and a presiding judge in each district. Vacancies on the court are filled by gubernatorial appointment; following the appointment of a judge, a new election for that seat is scheduled in the next Spring election in which no other Appeals Court seat in that Appeals Court District is up for election, unless that election occurs less than five months from the date of the appointment.

== Districts ==
- District I is chambered in Milwaukee and contains only Milwaukee County.
- District II is chambered in Waukesha and contains Calumet, Fond du Lac, Green Lake, Kenosha, Manitowoc, Ozaukee, Racine, Sheboygan, Walworth, Washington, Waukesha, and Winnebago counties.
- District III is chambered in Wausau and contains Ashland, Barron, Bayfield, Brown, Buffalo, Burnett, Chippewa, Door, Douglas, Dunn, Eau Claire, Florence, Forest, Iron, Kewaunee, Langlade, Lincoln, Marathon, Marinette, Menominee, Oconto, Oneida, Outagamie, Pepin, Pierce, Polk, Price, Rusk, Sawyer, Shawano, St. Croix, Taylor, Trempealeau, Vilas, and Washburn counties.
- District IV is chambered in Madison and contains Adams, Clark, Columbia, Crawford, Dane, Dodge, Grant, Green, Iowa, Jackson, Jefferson, Juneau, La Crosse, Lafayette, Marquette, Monroe, Portage, Richland, Rock, Sauk, Vernon, Waupaca, Waushara, and Wood counties.

== Current judges ==
District	Name	Born	Start	Term ends (Note: Terms end on July 31.)	Appointer	Law school
I	Joe Donald, Chief Judge	February 8, 1959 (age 67)	September 4, 2019	2032	Tony Evers (D)	Marquette
I	Pedro Colón, Presiding Judge	April 7, 1968 (age 58)	November 20, 2023	2030	Tony Evers (D)	Wisconsin
I	Sara Geenen	1981 or 1982 (age 44–45)	August 1, 2023	2029	—N/a (Note: Took office after being elected in a nonpartisan election.)	Wisconsin
I	Nathan Petrashek	1984 (age 41–42)	April 4, 2026	2027	Tony Evers (D)	Marquette
II	Mark Gundrum	March 20, 1970 (age 56)	November 4, 2011	2031	Scott Walker (R)	Wisconsin
II	Shelley Grogan	August 14, 1967 (age 59)	August 1, 2021	2027	—N/a	Marquette
II	Maria Lazar	1964 (age 61–62)	August 1, 2022	2028	—N/a	Georgetown
II	Anthony LoCoco	1990 (age 35–36)	August 1, 2026	2032	—N/a	Harvard
III	Lisa Stark, Presiding Judge	March 15, 1957 (age 69)	April 23, 2013	2031	Scott Walker (R) (Note: Stark was initially elected in the 2013 spring election. Walker then appointed Stark to the vacant seat, allowing her to begin her term 3 months earlier than scheduled.)	Wisconsin
III	Thomas Hruz	November 12, 1973 (age 53)	August 1, 2014	2028	Scott Walker (R)	Marquette
III	Gregory Gill	February 26, 1975 (age 51)	August 1, 2021	2027	—N/a	Marquette
IV	Rachel Graham, Deputy Chief Judge	June 7, 1976 (age 50)	July 4, 2019	2032	Tony Evers (D)	Wisconsin
IV	JoAnne Kloppenburg	September 5, 1953 (age 73)	August 1, 2012	2030	—N/a	Wisconsin
IV	Jennifer Nashold	1965 (age 60–61)	August 1, 2019	2031	—N/a	Wisconsin
IV	Todd Ziegler	1969 (age 56–57)	August 1, 2026	2027	Tony Evers (D)	Wisconsin
IV	Katie York-Sullivan	–	November 10, 2026	2028	Tony Evers (D)	Golden Gate

== Judges ==
=== District I ===
Judge	Start year	End year	Notes
Robert C. Cannon	1978	1981	Presiding Judge (1978–1979)
John A. Decker	1978	1984	Chief Judge (1978–1983)
William R. Moser	1978	1992	Presiding Judge (1985–1992); Presiding Judge (1979–1983)
Rudolph T. Randa	1981	1982	Appointed by Lee S. Dreyfus (R); Elevated to E.D. Wis.
Michael T. Sullivan	1984	1996	
Charles B. Schudson	1992	2004	
Ted E. Wedemeyer Jr.	1982	1988	Presiding Judge (1983–1985)
Ted E. Wedemeyer Jr.	1992	2008	Presiding Judge (1993–2007)
Ralph Adam Fine	1988	2014	
Patricia Curley	1996	2016	Presiding Judge (2007–2016)
Joan Kessler	2004	2020	
Kitty Brennan	2008	2019	Appointed by Jim Doyle (D)
Rebecca Bradley	2015	2015	Appointed by Scott Walker (R); Elevated to the Wisconsin Supreme Court by Scott Walker (R)
William Brash	2015	2023	Appointed by Scott Walker (R); Chief Judge (2021–2023); Presiding Judge (2019–2021); Lost re-election
Timothy Dugan	2016	2023	Appointed by Scott Walker (R)
Joe Donald	2019		Appointed by Tony Evers (D); Presiding Judge (2021–2026); Chief Judge (2026–present)
Maxine Aldridge White	2020	2026	Appointed by Tony Evers (D); Chief Judge (2023–2026)
Sara Geenen	2023		
Pedro Colón	2023		Appointed by Tony Evers (D)
Nathan Petrashek	2026		Appointed by Tony Evers (D)

=== District II ===
Judge	Start year	End year	Notes
Harold M. Bode	1978	1981	
Clair H. Voss	1978	1983	Presiding Judge (1978–1983)
Richard S. Brown	1978	2015	Chief Judge (2007–2015); Presiding Judge (1996–2001); Presiding Judge (1983–1990)
Burton A. Scott	1980	1991	Chief Judge (1983–1989)
Neal Nettesheim	1983	2007	Appointed by Tony Earl (D); Deputy Chief Judge (1998–2007); Presiding Judge (2001–2003); Presiding Judge (1990–1993)
Daniel P. Anderson	1990	2011	Presiding Judge (2007–2009); Presiding Judge (2003–2005); Presiding Judge (1993–1996)
Harry G. Snyder	1991	2010	Appointed by Tommy Thompson (R); Presiding Judge
Lisa S. Neubauer	2007	2026	Appointed by Jim Doyle (D); Chief Judge (2015–2021); Presiding Judge (2009–2015)
Paul F. Reilly	2010	2022	Presiding Judge (2015–2021)
Mark Gundrum	2011		Appointed by Scott Walker (R); Presiding Judge (2021–present)
Brian Hagedorn	2015	2019	Appointed by Scott Walker (R); Elected to Wisconsin Supreme Court
Jeffrey O. Davis	2019	2021	Appointed by Tony Evers (D); Lost re-election
Shelley Grogan	2021		
Lori Kornblum	2022	2022	Appointed by Tony Evers (D); Lost re-election
Maria S. Lazar	2022		
Anthony LoCoco	2026		

=== District III ===
Judge	Start year	End year	Notes
W. Patrick Donlin	1978	1981	
John P. Foley	1978	1984	Presiding Judge (1981–1984)
Robert W. Dean	1978	1986	Presiding Judge (1978–1981)
Thomas Cane	1981	2007	Appointed by Lee S. Dreyfus (R); Chief Judge (1998–2007); Deputy Chief Judge (1989–1998); Presiding Judge (1984–1998)
Daniel L. LaRocque	1985	1997	Appointed by Tony Earl (D)
Gordon Myse	1986	1999	Appointed by Tony Earl (D); Presiding Judge (1998–1999)
Michael W. Hoover	1997	2015	Deputy Chief Judge (2012–2015); Presiding Judge (1999–2015)
Gregory A. Peterson	1999	2007	Deputy Chief Judge (2007–2012)
Edward R. Brunner	2007	2011	
Mark Mangerson	2011	2014	Appointed by Scott Walker (R)
Lisa K. Stark	2013		Appointed by Scott Walker (R); Deputy Chief Judge (2015–present); Presiding Judge (2015–present)
Thomas F. Hruz	2014		Appointed by Scott Walker (R)
Mark Seidl	2015	2021	
Gregory Gill	2021		

=== District IV ===
Judge	Start year	End year	Notes
Martha Bablitch	1978	1985	
Paul C. Gartzke	1978	1996	Presiding Judge (1978–1996)
Charles P. Dykman	1978	2010	Presiding Judge (2009–2010); Presiding Judge (1996–2001)
William Eich	1985	2000	Appointed by Tony Earl (D); Chief Judge (1989–1998)
Robert D. Sundby	1986	1996	
Margaret J. Vergeront	1994	2012	Presiding Judge (2010–2011)
Patience D. Roggensack	1996	2003	Elected to Wisconsin Supreme Court
David G. Deininger	1996	2007	Appointed by Tommy Thompson (R); Presiding Judge (2003–2005)
Paul Lundsten	2000	2019	Appointed by Tommy Thompson (R); Presiding Judge (2017–2019); Presiding Judge (2011–2013); Presiding Judge (2005–2007)
Paul B. Higginbotham	2003	2017	Appointed by Jim Doyle (D); Presiding Judge (2007–2009)
Burnie Bridge	2007	2010	Appointed by Jim Doyle (D)
Gary Sherman	2010	2019	Appointed by Jim Doyle (D)
Brian Blanchard	2010		Presiding Judge (2021–present); Presiding Judge (2013–2015)
JoAnne Kloppenburg	2012		Presiding Judge (2015–2017)
Michael R. Fitzpatrick	2017	2023	Presiding Judge (2019–2021)
Rachel A. Graham	2019		Appointed by Tony Evers (D)
Jennifer E. Nashold	2019		
Chris Taylor	2023	2026	Elected to Wisconsin Supreme Court
Todd Ziegler	2026		Appointed by Tony Evers (D)

== See also ==
- Courts of Wisconsin
