= Chris Taylor (judge) =

American judge (born 1968)

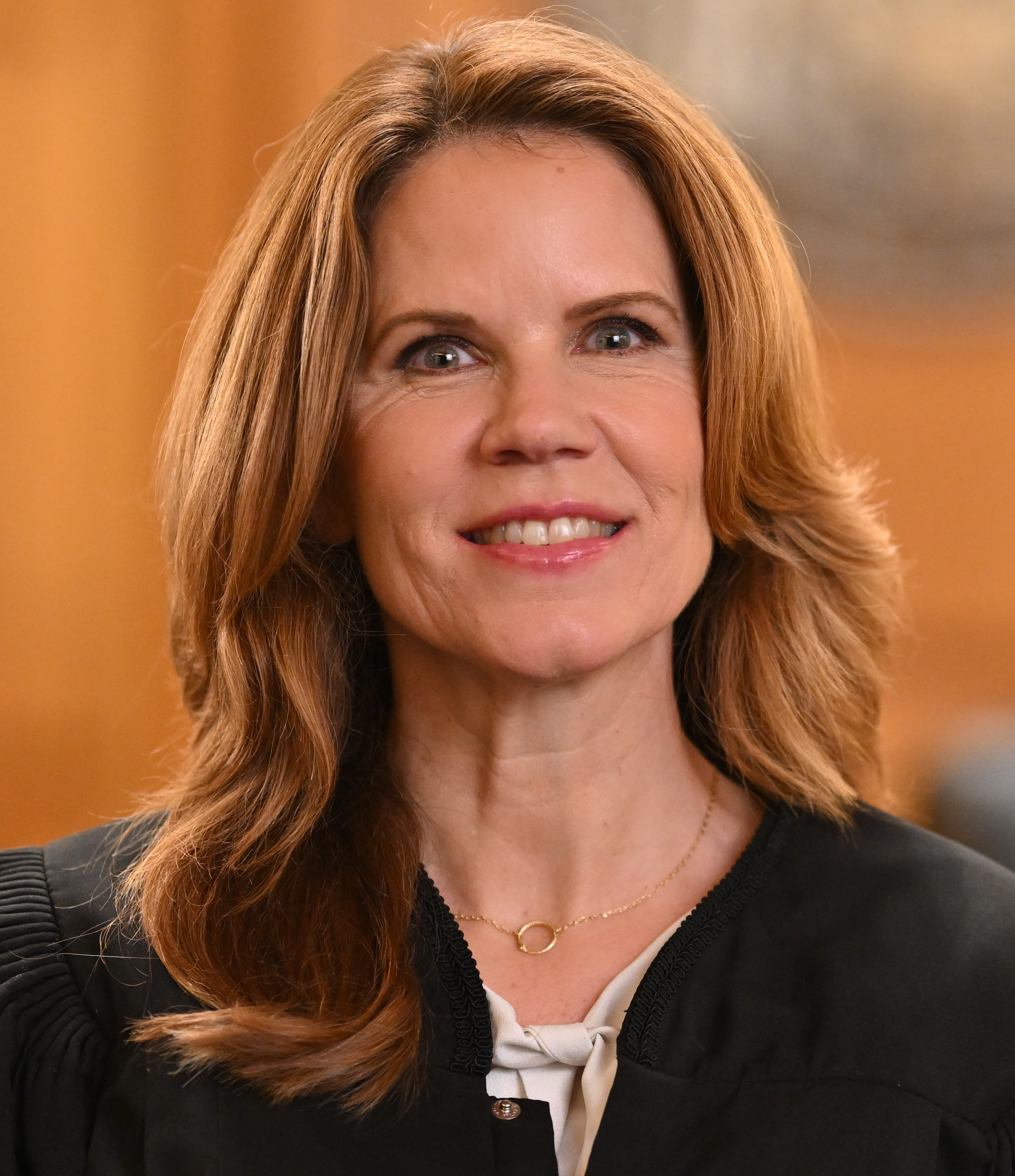
- Taylor in 2026

Justice of the Wisconsin Supreme Court
- Incumbent
- Assumed office August 1, 2026
- Preceded by: Rebecca Bradley

Judge of the Wisconsin Court of Appeals District IV
- In office August 1, 2023 – July 31, 2026
- Preceded by: Michael R. Fitzpatrick
- Succeeded by: Todd Ziegler

Judge of the Dane County Circuit Court Branch 12
- In office August 1, 2020 – July 31, 2023
- Appointed by: Tony Evers
- Preceded by: Jill Karofsky
- Succeeded by: Ann Peacock

Member of the Wisconsin State Assembly
- In office January 3, 2013 – July 31, 2020
- Preceded by: Terese Berceau
- Succeeded by: Francesca Hong
- Constituency: 76th district
- In office August 9, 2011 – January 3, 2013
- Preceded by: Joe Parisi
- Succeeded by: Melissa Agard
- Constituency: 48th district

Personal details
- Born: Christine Lyn Taylor; January 13, 1968 (age 58) Los Angeles, California, U.S.
- Party: Democratic
- Spouse: James Feldman
- Children: 2
- Education: University of Pennsylvania (BA); University of Wisconsin, Madison (JD)
- Website: Campaign website

Christine Lyn Taylor (born January 13, 1968) is an American lawyer, jurist, and former politician from Madison, Wisconsin. She is a justice of the Wisconsin Supreme Court, having been elected in 2026. Before her election to the Supreme Court, she served three years as a judge of the Wisconsin Court of Appeals (2023–2026) and three years as a Wisconsin circuit court judge in Dane County (2020–2023).

Earlier in her career, Taylor served nine years as a Democratic member of the Wisconsin State Assembly, representing downtown Madison from 2011 to 2020. Before holding public office, she worked as a private practice attorney in Milwaukee and Madison and as the public policy director for Planned Parenthood of Wisconsin.

== Early life and education ==
Taylor was born in Los Angeles, California, on January 13, 1968, where her parents raised her and her sister. She graduated from Birmingham High School in the Van Nuys neighborhood of Los Angeles and received her Bachelor of Arts from the University of Pennsylvania in 1990. She then attended the University of Wisconsin Law School, earning her Juris Doctor in 1995. She remained in Wisconsin, was admitted to the State Bar of Wisconsin, and worked as a private practice attorney in Milwaukee and Madison from 1996 to 2002. In 2003, she became the public policy director for Planned Parenthood of Wisconsin.

== Wisconsin Legislature (2011–2020) ==
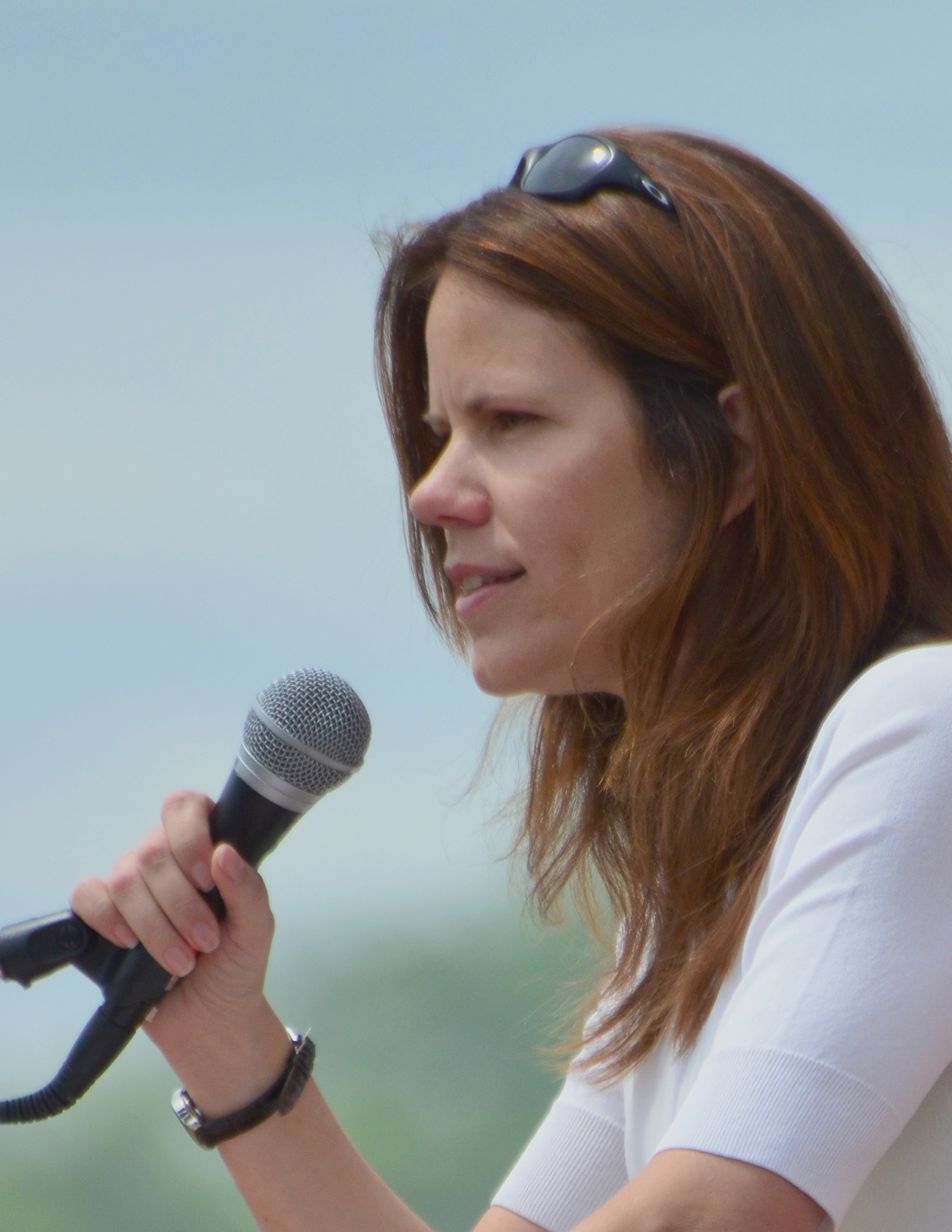
Taylor as a state representative in May 2012

In 2011, a vacancy occurred in the Wisconsin State Assembly due to the resignation of Joe Parisi, who had been elected to serve as Dane County Executive. Taylor had not held public office before, but won the six-person Democratic primary with 31% of the vote. She faced no Republican opponent in the general election, and won 5,459 votes; there were 591 write-in votes against her.

The heavily Democratic 48th District included parts of the east and far east sides of Madison, parts of Monona and McFarland, and the towns of Blooming Grove and Dunn. But this was the final year for these district boundaries, as new districts had already been drawn by the legislature. In 2012, Taylor ran for reelection in the redrawn 76th district, which contained parts of downtown Madison and northeast Madison—including the Wisconsin State Capitol.

In 2017, after Representative Peter Barca announced he would step down from his role as Democratic minority leader in the Assembly, Taylor was considered a strong candidate to replace him, but she supported Gordon Hintz for the role and was appointed to the budget-writing Joint Finance Committee shortly thereafter. She also served on the Joint Legislative Council and the Assembly committees on Federalism and Interstate Relations, on Finance, and on Public Benefit Reform.

Taylor was reelected in 2012, 2014, 2016, and 2018, but only faced an opponent in 2016, when she won 83% of the vote. On March 26, 2020, Taylor announced she would not seek reelection in 2020.

During her time in the Legislature, she "was an outspoken supporter of abortion rights, gun control and unions."

== Wisconsin courts (2020–present) ==
On June 11, 2020, Wisconsin Governor Tony Evers announced he was appointing Taylor to the Wisconsin circuit court in Dane County. Taylor replaced Judge Jill Karofsky, who had been elected to the Wisconsin Supreme Court in April 2020. Taylor was elected to a full term as judge in the April 2021.

In 2023, Taylor was elected to the Wisconsin Court of Appeals, running without opposition in the election to succeed outgoing judge Michael R. Fitzpatrick. She was discussed as a potential candidate for the Wisconsin Supreme Court in the 2025 election after incumbent justice Ann Walsh Bradley announced her retirement, but chose not to run in that election, instead endorsing eventual winner Susan M. Crawford.

Shortly after the 2025 Wisconsin Supreme Court election, Taylor announced her candidacy in the 2026 Wisconsin Supreme Court election, challenging incumbent justice Rebecca Bradley. Shortly after announcing her campaign, Taylor was endorsed by Wisconsin Supreme Court justices Rebecca Dallet, Jill Karofsky, Janet Protasiewicz, and Susan Crawford.

Bradley decided not to run for reelection, and Taylor instead faced fellow Court of Appeals judge Maria S. Lazar. Taylor defeated Lazar in the April 2026 election. Her victory is the fourth straight win for Democratic-backed candidates in Wisconsin Supreme Court elections, and gives the liberals a 5–2 majority on the court.

== Personal life ==
Taylor and her husband, college professor James Feldman, have two children.

== Electoral history ==
=== Wisconsin Assembly ===
==== 48th district (2011) ====
Wisconsin Assembly, 48th district special election, 2011
Party	Candidate	Votes	%	±%
Special Democratic primary, July 12, 2011
Democratic	Chris Taylor	3,383	31.40%	
Democratic	Vicky Selkowe	2,452	22.76%	
Democratic	Fred Arnold	1,507	13.99%	
Democratic	Andy Heidt	1,190	11.05%	
Democratic	Bethany Ordaz	1,149	10.67%	
Democratic	Dave De Felice	1,086	10.08%	
	Scattering	6	0.06%	
Plurality		931	8.64%	
Total votes		10,773	100.0%	
Special election, August 9, 2011
Democratic	Chris Taylor	5,453	93.50%	
	Scattering	379	6.50%	
Plurality		5,074	87.00%	
Total votes		5,832	100.0%	
Democratic hold				

==== 76th district (2012–2018) ====
Wisconsin Assembly, 76th district election, 2016
Party	Candidate	Votes	%	±%
General election, November 8, 2016
Democratic	Chris Taylor	33,628	82.77%	
Republican	Jon Rygiewicz	6,877	16.93%	
	Scattering	124	0.31%	
Plurality		26,751	65.84%	
Total votes		40,629	100.0%	
Democratic hold				

=== Wisconsin circuit court (2021) ===
Wisconsin Circuit Courts, Dane Circuit, Branch 12 Election, 2021
Party	Candidate	Votes	%	±%
General Election, April 6, 2021
Nonpartisan	Chris Taylor (incumbent)	80,833	99.10%	
	Scattering	737	0.90%	
Total votes		81,570	100.0%	

=== Wisconsin Court of Appeals (2023) ===
Wisconsin Court of Appeals, 4th District Election, 2023
Party	Candidate	Votes	%	±%
General Election, April 4, 2023
Nonpartisan	Chris Taylor	412,491	98.95%	
	Scattering	4,362	1.05%	
Total votes		416,853	100.0%	

=== Wisconsin Supreme Court (2026) ===
Wisconsin Supreme Court Election, 2026
Party	Candidate	Votes	%	±%
General Election, April 7, 2026
Nonpartisan	Chris Taylor	905,490	60.09%	
Nonpartisan	Maria S. Lazar	600,256	39.84%	
	Scattering	1,096	0.07%	
Plurality		305,234	20.25%	+10.16pp
Total votes		1,506,842	100.0%	-36.30%

Legal offices
Preceded by Rebecca Bradley	Justice of the Wisconsin Supreme Court; 2026–present	Incumbent
