= 2019 Wisconsin Supreme Court election =

- April 2, 2019
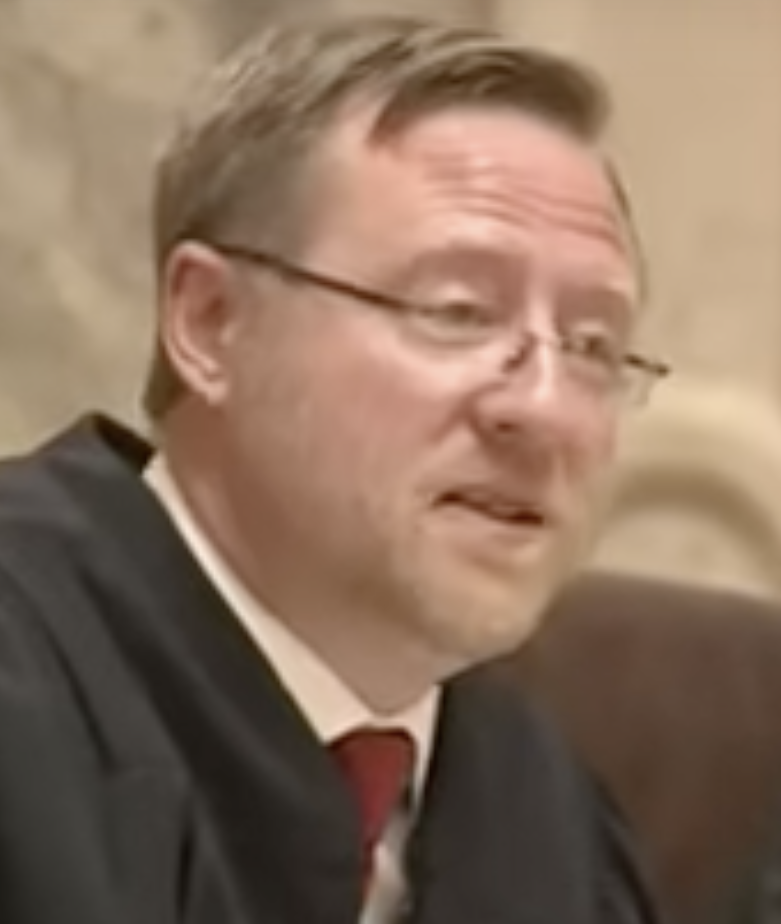

Candidate	Brian Hagedorn	Lisa Neubauer
Popular vote	606,414	600,433
Percentage	50.22%	49.72%
- Hagedorn: 50–60% 60–70% 70–80% Neubauer: 50–60% 60–70% 70–80%
Justice before election
Shirley Abrahamson
Elected Justice
Brian Hagedorn

The 2019 Wisconsin Supreme Court election was held on Tuesday, April 2, 2019, to elect a justice to the Wisconsin Supreme Court for a ten-year term. The incumbent justice, Shirley Abrahamson, retired after 43 years on the court, the longest in the history of the Wisconsin Supreme Court. Although the Wisconsin Supreme Court justices are considered nonpartisan, Abrahamson identified as a liberal and voted with the liberal 3–4 minority on the court. Two colleagues on District II of the Wisconsin Court of Appeals faced off in the general election with judge Brian Hagedorn narrowly defeating Chief judge Lisa Neubauer, shifting the ideology of the court towards conservatives.

This is the most recent time that a conservative candidate has won election to the court. It is also the only contested Supreme Court election held since 2016 that did not see a liberal candidate win at least 55% of the vote against a conservative candidate; that was the outcome of the 2018, 2020, 2023, 2025, and 2026 elections.

== Background ==
The 2018 and 2019 elections are the fifth instance in the court's history in which two consecutive elections were for open seats (without an incumbent running). (Note: The four previous instances in Wisconsin state history in which consecutive supreme court elections have been for open seats were: 1961 and 1963; 1977 and 1978; 1980 and 1983; 1995 and 1996; A further instance after occurred, with the four consecutive 2023, 2025, 2026, and upcoming 2027 elections)

There was no primary held, because only two candidates ran. Had a third candidate qualified for the ballot, a primary would have been held. It is rare for contested Wisconsin Supreme Court races to be held without the need for a primary, with this being the first such instance since 1978, and the last until 2025.

== Candidates ==
There was no Supreme Court primary in 2019, as only two candidates ran for the seat.

=== Declared ===
- Brian Hagedorn, Wisconsin Court of Appeals judge
- Lisa Neubauer, chief judge of the Wisconsin Court of Appeals

=== Declined ===
- Shirley Abrahamson, incumbent Supreme Court justice
- Susan Happ, Jefferson County district attorney, Democratic nominee for Wisconsin attorney general in 2014
- Maria Lazar, judge of the Waukesha County Circuit Court (endorsed Hagedorn)

== General election ==
=== Campaign ===
During the campaign, Neubauer ran on her qualifications, often highlighting the endorsement of over 300 judges across the state. Her campaign also opted against direct donations and resources from the state Democratic party.

Hagedorn's campaign was hit early on by scandals involving his blog writings when he was a law student. Examples of Hagedorn's writings include comparing homosexuality to bestiality, referring to Planned Parenthood as a “wicked organization more committed to killing babies than helping women.” In response to critiques on his past blog posts, Hagedorn stated it was an attack on his Christian evangelical faith, and that he sets aside his personal beliefs on the bench. Hagedorn was also under fire for serving on the board of Augustine Academy, a Christian school, that bans its faculty, students, and student's parents from being in same-sex relationships. This led to some organizations that traditionally support the conservative candidate in Wisconsin Supreme Court elections to sit out, including the U.S. Chamber of Commerce and the Wisconsin Realtor's Association, which rescinded their endorsement.

During the debates in March, both candidates sought to characterize the other as the partisan candidate. Neubauer focused on Hagedorn's past blog writings and his previous work as Governor Scott Walker's legal counsel, while Hagedorn tied Neubauer to incumbent Justice Shirley Abrahamson, whom he viewed as a biased jurist.

Throughout the campaign, Neubauer held a spending and fundraising advantage, and at one point had outspent Hagedorn 14-to-1. During the last week of the campaign in March, the Republican State Leadership Committee spent over $1 million in ads supporting Hagedorn, portraying Hagedorn as a victim of smears of similar nature to Justice Brett Kavanaugh during his contentious hearings. The RSLC specifically targeted low-propensity Trump voters during their ad campaign.

On election day, Hagedorn emerged as the top vote getter, with a 6,000 vote lead over Neubauer. Hagedorn declared victory the following day, describing his lead as insurmountable. Neubauer conceded the race one week later on April 10. Hagedorn's victory was seen as an upset victory, in part due to his scandals during the campaign and Neubauer's spending advantage. Wisconsin Republican Party Executive Director Mark Jefferson touted Hagedorn's victory as sending, "[a] message to all of America that we're ready to keep Wisconsin red as we turn our attention to mobilizing for 2020 and re-electing President Trump."

=== Endorsements ===
Brian Hagedorn

Judicial officials

- Rebecca Bradley, justice of the Wisconsin Supreme Court
- Michael Gableman, former justice of the Wisconsin Supreme Court (2008–2018)
- Daniel Kelly, justice of the Wisconsin Supreme Court
- David Prosser, former justice of the Wisconsin Supreme Court (1998–2016)
- Jon Wilcox, former justice of the Wisconsin Supreme Court (1992–2007)

Organizations

- National Rifle Association Political Victory Fund
- Pro-Life Wisconsin Victory Fund PAC
- ~~Wisconsin Realtors Association~~
- Wisconsin Right to Life PAC

Labor unions

- Milwaukee Police Association

Political parties

- Wisconsin Republican Party
Lisa Neubauer

Judicial officials

- 19 current and former Wisconsin Court of Appeals judges

Labor unions

- Teamsters Joint Council 39
- WI AFL-CIO
- Wisconsin Building Trades Council

Organizations

- Citizen Action Wisconsin
- Human Rights Campaign
- National Democratic Redistricting Committee
- Planned Parenthood Advocates of Wisconsin

Political parties

- Wisconsin Democratic Party
- Wisconsin Working Families Party

Newspapers and other media

- The Cap Times
- The Shepherd Express
- Wisconsin State Journal

=== Debates ===
2019 Wisconsin Supreme Court election debates
No.	Date	Host	Moderators	Link	Candidates	
P Participant A Absent N Non-invitee I Invitee W Withdrawn						
P Participant A Absent N Non-invitee I Invitee W Withdrawn					Hagedorn	Neubauer
1	March 15, 2019	WISC-TV; State Bar of Wisconsin; WisPolitics	Eric Franke		P	P
2	March 19, 2019	Milwaukee Bar Association; WisconsinEye	Steve Walters		P	P
3	March 26, 2019	WISN-TV; Marquette University Law School	Mike Gousha		P	P

=== Fundraising ===
Outside spending totaled around $4.3 million, with $2.7 million in favor of Neubauer and $1.6 million in favor of Hagedorn.

Campaign finance reports as of June 30, 2019
Candidate	Raised	Spent	Cash on hand
Brian Hagedorn	$1,723,399	$1,681,773	$42,075
Lisa Neubauer	$2,016,260	$2,013,196	$5,070
Source: WI Ethics Commission

=== Results ===
2019 Wisconsin Supreme Court election
Candidate	Votes	%
Brian Hagedorn	606,414	50.22
Lisa Neubauer	600,433	49.72
Write-in	722	0.06
Total votes	1,207,569	100.00

==== By congressional district ====
District	Hagedorn	Neubauer	Representative
1st	58.4%	41.6%	Bryan Steil
2nd	25.5%	74.5%	Mark Pocan
3rd	47.2%	52.8%	Ron Kind
4th	29.8%	70.2%	Gwen Moore
5th	64.6%	35.4%	Jim Sensenbrenner
6th	59.2%	40.8%	Glenn Grothman
7th	57.4%	42.6%	Sean Duffy
8th	57.3%	42.7%	Mike Gallagher

== See also ==
- 2019 Wisconsin elections
