= 1983 Wisconsin Supreme Court election =

- April 5, 1983

Candidate	William A. Bablitch	Gordon Myse
Popular vote	433,132	301,665
Percentage	58.95%	41.05%
- Bablitch: 50–60% 60–70% 70–80% 80–90% Myse: 50–60% 70–80%
Justice before election
Bruce F. Beilfuss
Elected Justice
William A. Bablitch

The 1983 Wisconsin Supreme Court election was held on April 5, 1983, and saw the election of State Senator William A. Bablitch to succeed retiring incumbent Bruce F. Beilfuss as justice.

As an incumbent state legislator without prior judicial experience, Bablitch sought to frame his background as a positive attribute. He argued that, because three-quarters of the court's cases dealt with questions of legislative intent, his background added a needed perspective that was missing from the court. He further argued that his legislative experience had exposed him to nearly any matter that could imaginably come before the court. Additionally, he asserted that his being an outsider of the state court system was a virtue, arguing the court's membership already had an excess number of former state trial judges. His general election opponent, Gordon Myse (an eleven year veteran of a Wisconsin circuit court), unsuccessfully asserted that Bablitch's lack of judicial experience made him less qualified.

Ahead of the primary, Myse was endorsed by 93% of incumbent Wisconsin state lower court judges. Bablitch and the third candidate in the race, Trayton L. Lathrop, both turned this endorsement into a liability for Myse by alleging that it was unethical of him to receive such endorsements from fellow judges.

Bablitch won a wide victory over Myse in the general election. However, Myse did manage to perform strongly in the Fox Valley region from which he hailed.

== Background ==
The 1983 election was for a ten-year term, succeeding retiring justice Bruce F. Beilfuss. With the preceding 1980 election also having been for an open seat, this marked the third instance in the court's history in which multiple consecutive elections were for open seats (elections without an incumbent running). (Note: The five previous instances in Wisconsin state history in which consecutive supreme court elections have been for open seats were: 1961 and 1963; 1977 and 1978; As of 2026, three subsequent instances of this have since occurred: 1995 and 1996; 2018 and 2019; 2023, 2025, 2026)

The election was the only statewide race in the Spring 1983 Wisconsin elections. No statewide ballot measures were on the primary ballot, making the race the sole statewide ballot item in the spring primaries. It did coincide with primaries for various Circuit Court judgeships, local school boards, municipal offices, as well as two special elections for Wisconsin Senate seats. Municipalities that held mayoral primaries and general elections coinciding with the election included Madison and Green Bay. Only 14% of eligible voters cast a vote in the primary.

In addition to the general elections of aforementioned down ballot races, the Supreme Court general election also coincided with a statewide referendum on whether voters would support a high-level radioactive waste disposal state being constructed in Wisconsin.

== Primary election ==
=== Candidates ===
==== Advanced to general election ====
- William A. Bablitch, President pro-tempore of the Wisconsin Senate (1983) and former Senate majority leader (1976–1982) from the 24th district (1973–1983), former district attorney of Portage County (1969–1973)
- Gordon Myse, judge of the Wisconsin Circuit Court of Outagamie County

==== Eliminated in the primary ====
- Trayton L. Lathrop, Madison-based attorney, candidate for Supreme Court in 1977

=== Primary campaign ===
==== Ideology and political affiliations of candidates ====
Outgoing justice Beilfuss was regarded to be a swing vote on the court.

While the race was officially nonpartisan, Bablitch and Myse both had histories as members of the Democratic Party. Bablitch had been a registered Democrat prior to becoming a judge, while Bablitch was an incumbent Democratic member of the Wisconsin Senate. Bablitch was considered ideologically liberal.

Lathrop criticized both Myse and Bablitch as being "judicial activists", and characterized himself as a strict constructionist. He argued that both his opponents had advocated the use of the court to "change outmoded laws" and bring about reforms that should be done legislatively. Lathrop argued, "a court should apply the law as written, uninfluenced by political, social, or economic beliefs. It should not change the law or bend the law." He was, in turn, criticized by both of his opponents as too "extreme" and overly "rigid".

Bablitch disagreed with Lathrop's characterization of him as "activist", and responded, "The unfortunate thing is that most people equate the word "activist" with liberalism, when in fact the history of the court has been replete with examples where the activists have been ultra-conservatives." Bablitch further argued that while courts generally needed to restrain themselves to strict interpretation of the law rather than imposing their own judgement against the judgement of a legislature, that rulings have occasionally needed to go beyond such restraints. He argued that without courts occasioning themselves to go beyond such narrow restrictions, "separate but equal would still be in effect; child labor laws and equal rights for women would not have been enacted."

Myse noted that he could agree with Lathrop that there was necessity for the law to be "predictable and stable," he disagreed with the notion that the law should never change unless the legislature acted to change it. Remarking, "no one in the judicial community that I am aware regards me as a wild-eyed activist,” Myse argued, "I suggest that the great art of judging is to be able to achieve measured and restrained growth in the law so it can address the problems in a relevant way in our complex so ciety, while at the same time having stability and predictability." Myse opined that, "law must be a living thing, relevant to the needs of contemporary society...with restraint, the law must change when required."

== Campaign ==
=== Bablitch's campaign ===
Bablitch resigned as majority leader of the Wisconsin Senate in 1982 in order to launch his campaign for the court. He would tout that he had sought to avoid partisan campaigning after this, as he was now pursuing a nonpartisan office. He characterized his judicial campaign as being a "bipartisan effort".

Bablitch was aiming to become the very first incumbent legislator to win election to the Wisconsin Supreme Court. He was the first incumbent state legislator to run for the court since 1974, when Raymond C. Johnson (the then-incumbent Senate majority leader) unsuccessfully ran.

Bablitch framed his legislative background as a core positive, arguing that the court (which, at the time, lacked a justice which such experience) needed a justice with a legislative background. He noted that three-quarters of the court's opinions involved analyses pertaining to legislative intent. He touted his legislative background as bringing him a wealth of experiential knowledge that would help inform the court in better addressing questions relating to legislative intent. He also argued that legislative voting record provided voters with a far more thorough account of ideological stances than his opponent's judicial career could provide, remarking,

There is scarcely an issue you could think of that the Supreme Court has dealt with or will deal with that I have not dealt with in my ten years as a legislator...[voters] have a known quantity in me and an unknown quantity in my opponent. You don't have to guess where I'm coming from philosophically on a lot of issues.

Bablitch also touted his negotiation experiences in the legislature as giving him practice at dealing with, "incredibly diverse personalities," and making him well-prepared to "be collegial" towards litigants appearing before the court. Myse, however, would counter this argument by arguing, "compromise is fine in the legislative arena, but those are not the processes used in the judicial system."

Bablitch argued that it would be a positive for his experience as a legislature to, "greatly assist the court in bridging the gap between the gap between the Legislature and the two other branches of government." He also argued that the court already had an "overbalance" of justices with trial court backgrounds, and that the election instead of a legislator would help create what he dubbed "a balanced court". He further asserted that those who spent their careers as judges too frequently disregarded the actual intent of the Wisconsin Legislature and instead interpreted the law in a matter tailored to suit their own desired outcomes. Bablitch criticized the court as holding power "unequaled by the other two branches [of the state government]" that should be restrained by the judges ceasing to impose their own "judgement on questions of social policy," and instead acting to enforce, "that of the Legislature." He argued that the Wisconsin Supreme Court had recently "gone out of its way" to substitute its own personal opinion over legislative intent, and opined "it is not the role of a justice to substitute his or her values for those of the executive or legislative branches."

Bablitch framed himself as a break from the conventional mold of a justice, highlighting this a point of contrast between himself and Myse (who fit that mold). He later remarked in his general election victory speech, "Myse appealed to all the stereotypes. I had to define the role of the Supreme Court as an entirely different court from the lower courts," declaring that in his campaign he had successfully framed the Supreme Court as an "issues court". During the campaign, Bablitch also argued that, while (compared to his opponents) he lacked in endorsements from judges and lawyers, this did not matter because the legal profession did not have a rightful monopoly on the courts; rather, "the court. belong to the people." Bablitch, an attorney-turned-legislator, argued the election of a legislator was necessary to break the legal profession's effective monopoly on the court. He argued that instead of being a limited club for former trial court judges, the court needed to become, "a mosaic representing a broad cross-section of experiences so that the different perspectives and insights can be brought into resolving the issues that it needs to decide." Bablitch leveraged connections he had made in his fourteen year career as a politician in order to build what was characterized as a people-oriented campaign.

Bablitch agreed with Myse on the need for the Supreme Court to play a greater role in administrating the Circuit Court system, however he disagreed with Myse on the specifics of how this should be accomplished. Bablitch believed that the Supreme Court had not been strict enough in administering the Circuit Courts, and argued that it should use computers to keep track of the caseloads handled by Circuit Court judges and discipline judges who were falling behind in addressing their caseload. Bablitch argued there was too severe a case backlog in the Circuit Courts, and that this would be an effective means of addressing it. He argued that an important way to decrease the backload would be for the state's court system to, "[encourage more] people to find alternative methods [to trials] of settling disputes."

A key issue Bablitch that highlighted as something he would continue his work on was sentencing reform. He had thrice tried unsuccessfully as a state senator to pass mandatory minimum sentences for select offenses. He argued that, amidst the failure of the legislature to pass statutory mandatory sentencing minimums, that it was imperative for the Supreme Court to expand use of its own authority to create sentencing guidelines. He cited sentencing guidelines piloted in Racine County the previous year as something worth expanding upon. He especially believed that such guidelines should be imposed for violent crimes and other crimes involving the use of a weapon. On removing judicial discretion on sentencing from Circuit Court justices, Bablitch argued, "I think some discretion ought to be taken away from them. I think the public is appalled –on a daily basis– and right so, at some of the [lax] sentences [imposed by Circuit Court justices]."

=== Myse's campaign ===
Myse touted his judicial experience, having spent eleven years as a Circuit Court judge, as well as having served as the chief administrative judge of Outagamie County and served as a faculty member of the National Judiciary Council. He touted his background as giving him a strong experience in legal interpretation, administration of courts, and judicial education. He asserted that, in contrast, Bablitch's lack of judicial experience made him unqualified to serve as a justice. Myse also attempted to frame Bablitch's background as a politician and legislator to be a negative. He argued that electing Bablitch to the court would effectively be, "turn[ing] the courts of the state over to politicians," which he argued the people of Wisconsin were disinterested in doing. Myse argued, "courts are a place for justice, not politicians." His campaign ran a television commercial which argued to voters that it would be wise to choose a judge for a judge's job. He disagreed with Bablitch's assertion that his lack of judicial experience should be considered a positive,

Not being involved in our system of justice is not a qualification to sit on the highest court of this state. Bill [Bablitch] is an effective legislator and I am not saying he is not qualified. But he has never been involved in the judicial system. That can never be an advantage, no matter how hard he tries to make it seem so.

Myse also raised concern about the prospect that Bablitch could hypothetically review cases involving legislation that he or close colleagues had authored in the legislature. While this was not an ethical violation, Myse argued that is raised questions about Bablitch's ability to be an impartial judge.

Myse agreed with Bablitch on the need for the Supreme Court to play a greater role in administrating the Circuit Court system, however he disagreed with Bablitch on the specifics of how this should be accomplished. He opposed the notion of revoking powers held by the Circuit Courts themselves arguing, "to take away the power of local courts and put it somewhere in Madison (Note: Madison being the state capital of Wisconsin) is to limit the ability of the courts to serve the communities they are in." Myse's position on the issue of administration of the Circuit Court system emphasized imposing greater continuing legal education among Circuit Court judges, and investing in updated record keeping technology for the Circuit Courts. His position further emphasized making rule changes to modify the two-year rotation that governed the branch assignments of Circuit Court judges. On his opposition to the mandated rotation policy, Myse remarked,

I think judges and lawyers are overwhelmingly opposed to rotation. It deprives judges of developing areas of expertise and discourages the recruiting of qualified layers to the bench because they cannot stay in the area of their special interests. You can get better efficiency and a broader based judiciary by assigning judges to other cases [while also allowing them to specialize in areas of law they hold expertise and particular interest]

Myse highlighted victims' rights as a major area of concern of his that he would continue to advocate on if elected to the Supreme Court. This included matters of reform relating to restitution, tougher sentencing, and provision of community services to victims of various violent and sexual crimes.

Myse criticized Bablitch for comments he made on a case which could potentially be appealed to the Supreme Court, arguing that this violated American Bar Association guidelines for judicial candidates.

In advance of the primary election, Myse advertised that he had received endorsements from 93% of the incumbent judges in the Wisconsin Circuit Courts and Appellate Courts. Bablitch would remark that, because of this, he effectively was running against the state judicial system. He argued that the lower court endorsements of Myse were motivated by the desire of those judges to have one of their own elected to the Supreme Court, rather than someone (such as Bablitch) from outside their ranks; with Bablitch noting that the Supreme Court holds oversight of the lower courts. Myse's endorsements from fellow state judges motivated both Bablitch and Lathrop to accuse him of disregarding the American Bar Association's ethical guidelines discouragement of judges endorsing one another. Myse disregarded this criticism of being "a phony issue". The discourse over his endorsements from other judges became a major issue in the closing weeks of the primary campaign, with The Post-Crescent reporting,

Supreme Court races are generally quiet, gentlemanly contests, with the candidates stressing their qualifications and/or judicial philosophies. In recent weeks, this campaign departed from tradition when a side-issue became hot media copy. The issue is the endorsement of Myse by 93% of the state's 200 circuit and appeal court judges. Normally a strong endorsement of this nature would be considered a distinct honor, since it reflects the high esteem in which Myse is held by his colleagues. But Balbitch and Lathrop have turned the endorsement on its head, making it appear a disadvantage or worse, something that clouds Myse's integrity and impartiality.

Myse argued that Bablitch's strong lead in the primary was attributed to Bablitch's greater name recognition as a well known member of the state legislature. In an effort to make up this gap ahead of the general election, Myse traveled extensively across the state for campaign events.

=== Lathrop's campaign ===
Lathrop touted himself the contender who could "best restore public confidence in the court". He claimed to have no ethics controversy (contending that such controversies legitimately tainted both his opponents), and also touted himself as unbeholden to any endorsements or contributions from "special interests". Lathrop, who had 35 years of experience as an attorney, touted that his experience as a lawyer made him well-qualified for the court, noting he had experience in a vast array of legal areas, and had argued cases before both the Wisconsin Supreme Court and United States Supreme Court. He argued that neither of his opponents met, "the needs of the public for a Supreme Court justice". Lathrop was critical of both Bablitch's background as a politician and of Myse's endorsements from fellow state court judges. He joined Bablitch in criticizes Myse's endorsements from fellow judges as unethical, and joined Myse in asserting that Bablitch's background as a legislator did "not qualify him to be a Supreme Court Justice." He also castigated both Bablitch and Myse as "activist", and further criticized Bablitch for using $20,000 originally collected by his former legislative campaign committee to fund costs of his judicial campaign. Lathrop additionally argued that the there had been an injection of partisan politics into the election that threatened to diminish the separation of powers between the officially nonpartisan state judiciary and the state's other two branches of government; specifically arguing that Bablitch's background as a legislator would result in him injecting politics into the judiciary if elected a justice.

Lathrop opposed the state's integrated bar, under which the Supreme Court enforces a requirement of attorneys to be dues-paying members of the State Bar of Wisconsin. Lathrop also asserted that the court system had an excess backlog in its court calendars, which posed a genuine problem.

Lathrop expressed great concern against the existing rule for lower-court judges to rotated to a different branch within their circuit every two years. He remarked, "judicial rotations has hampered the efficient operation of the court system," arguing that it created risk of judges rendering an error due to the unfamiliarity with their case's setting. He argued that such errors exacerbated the case backlog, as they could render decisions appealable.

== Endorsements ==
William Bablitch

U.S. Representatives

- Dave Obey, U.S. representative from WI–7 (Democratic)
- Tom Petri, U.S. representative from WI–6 (Republican)

State legislators

- Clifford Krueger, former state senator from the 12th and 25th districts (1947–1955; 1957–1983) (Republican)

Trade unions

- Wisconsin AFL-CIO

Newspaper editorial boards

- Chippewa Herald-Telegram
- Kenosha News
- La Crosse Tribune
Gordon Myse

State judges

- 93% of incumbent Circuit Court and Appellate Court judges
- George R. Currie, former justice of the Wisconsin Supreme Court
- Leo B. Hanley, former justice of the Wisconsin Supreme Court
- Connor Hansen, former justice of the Wisconsin Supreme Court
- Robert W. Hansen, former justice of the Wisconsin Supreme Court

County officials

- Daniel Piechowski, Kenosha County sheriff
- Bruce Schroeder, former district attorney of Kenosha County (1972–1977) (Democratic)

Organizations

- Wisconsin County Police Association
- Wisconsin Deputy Sheriffs Association
- Wisconsin Law Enforcement Officers Association
- Wisconsin Professional Police Association

Newspaper editorial boards

- Milwaukee Journal Sentinel
- Oshkosh Northwestern
- The Sheboygan Press
- Wisconsin State Journal

== Results ==
1983 Wisconsin Supreme Court election
Party	Candidate	Votes	%	±%
Primary election (February 15, 1983)
Nonpartisan	William A. Bablitch	132,614	50.45	
Nonpartisan	Gordon Myse	80,337	30.56	
Nonpartisan	Trayton L. Lathrop	49,926	18.99	
Total votes		262,877	100	
General election (April 5, 1983)
Nonpartisan	William A. Bablitch	433,132	58.95	
Nonpartisan	Gordon Myse	301,665	41.05	
Total votes		734,797	100	

In the general election, both candidates performed well in their respective home turfs. Bablitch, a Stevens Point native, routed Myse in Portage County. Myse performed strongly in his native Fox Valley region. Bablitch was reported to be only the second resident of Portage County ever to win election to the Supreme Court, after George B. Nelson (elected in 1935).

In his victory remarks, Bablitch remarked on having, "nothing but respect for my opponent," commending Myse as an undoubtedly qualified candidate who had comported himself as a "quality person in the campaign."

== Aftermath ==
Bablitch served for twenty years, being re-elected in 1993. During his tenure, he was regarded to be a member of the court's liberal wing.

Myse resigned from his Circuit Court judgeship in August 1983. He cited personal financial burdens as the reason for resigning his judgeship, noting that his judicial campaign had placed a heavy personal financial burden upon him, and arguing that the judicial wages for Circuit Court judges (which had only seen a 3% increase over the previous four years) was insufficient to entice him to remain on the bench amid that financial burden. He announced his intention to return to higher-paying private practice.
