= 2025 Wisconsin Supreme Court election =

- April 1, 2025
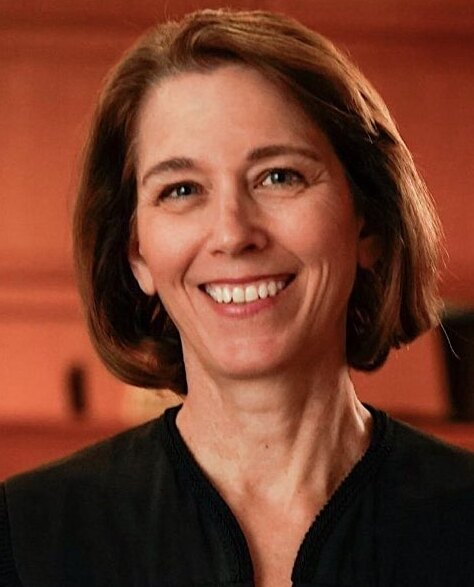

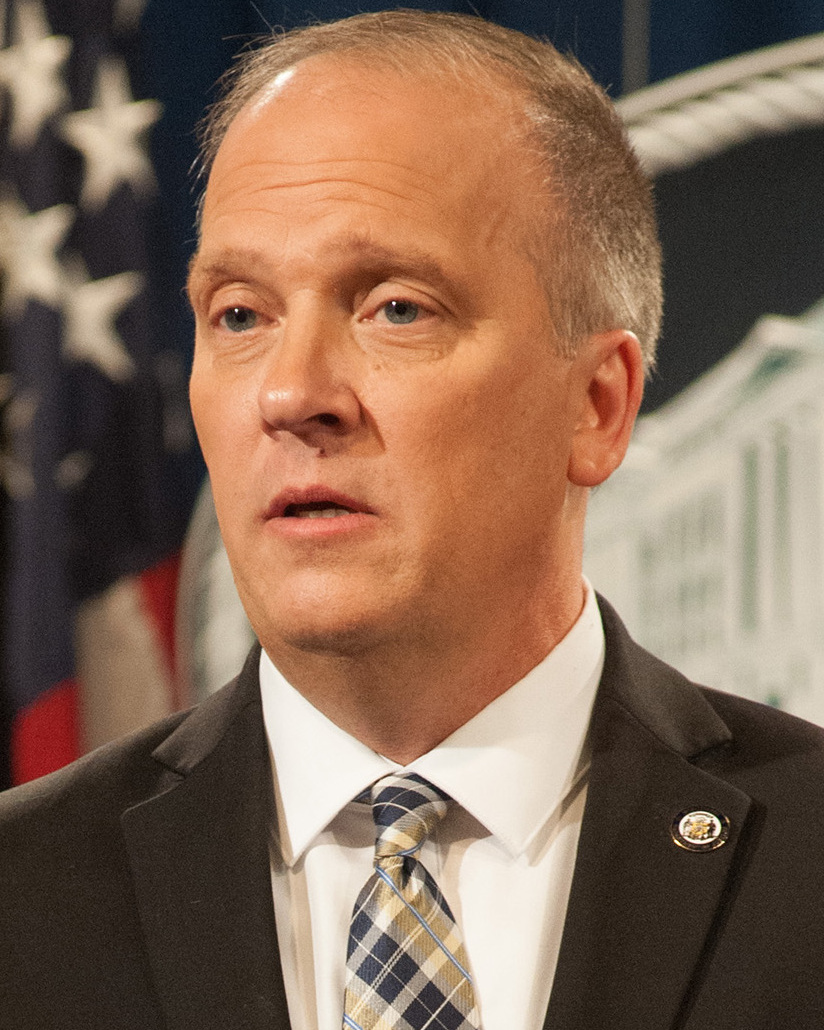
Candidate	Susan Crawford	Brad Schimel
Popular vote	1,301,137	1,062,330
Percentage	55.02%	44.92%
- Crawford: 40–50% 50–60% 60–70% 70–80% 80–90% >90% Schimel: 40–50% 50–60% 60–70% 70–80% 80–90% >90% Tie: 40–50% 50% No data/No votes
Justice before election
Ann Walsh Bradley
Elected Justice
Susan M. Crawford

The 2025 Wisconsin Supreme Court election was held on April 1, 2025, to elect a justice of the Wisconsin Supreme Court for a ten-year term. Dane County circuit judge Susan M. Crawford defeated Waukesha County circuit judge and former state attorney general Brad Schimel, maintaining the liberal 4–3 majority on the court. Crawford was sworn in on August 1, 2025.

Incumbent justice Ann Walsh Bradley chose to retire after 30 years on the court; she had been identified as a liberal and voted consistently with the liberal 4–3 majority on the court. Crawford was identified as the liberal candidate in this election, and received support from the Democratic Party of Wisconsin and Democratic Party-aligned donors. Schimel was identified as a conservative and was supported by the Republican Party of Wisconsin and Republican Party-aligned donors.

The election received significant national media attention and became the most expensive judicial race in United States history, with total spending over $100 million. The largest single contributor to the election, by far, was billionaire Elon Musk, who spent more than $25 million to support Schimel through political action committees. Schimel also received major contributions from conservative billionaires Diane Hendricks and Richard and Elizabeth Uihlein; on Crawford's side, billionaires George Soros and Illinois governor JB Pritzker made major donations, though their combined contributions amounted to less than 15% of Musk's funding for Schimel.

Musk's involvement in the campaign further intensified interest from national media; Musk at that time was also serving as a senior advisor and "special government employee" to U.S. President Donald Trump, serving as the head of DOGE and the owner of one of the largest social media companies in the world. In addition to his campaign donations, Musk aggressively utilized his social media presence to campaign for Schimel and to attack Crawford, and he also held a highly publicized campaign rally for Schimel in Green Bay, where he gave away two $1 million checks to Wisconsin residents in an effort to boost Republican voter turnout. While Musk's money and effort may have ultimately boosted Republican turnout, Democrats likely had a significant turnout advantage and according to an analysis by Split Ticket, "the voters who voted in the 2025 Supreme Court election backed Kamala Harris by 7 points in 2024."

Crawford won the election by about 10 percentage points, about 0.5 percentage points closer than the 2020 election and 1 point closer than the 2023 election. Because of the schedule of upcoming judicial elections in Wisconsin, Crawford's victory likely secures a liberal majority on the Wisconsin Supreme Court until at least August 2028.

The turnout level seen was similar to that of a midterm election and significantly exceeded that of any previous Wisconsin Supreme Court election.

== Background ==
In the court's previous election, held in 2023, Janet Protasiewicz won an open-seat race. Prior to the 2023 election, the court had been regarded to have an 4–3 conservative majority in the lean of its justices' judicial ideology. After the election, this changed to a 4–3 liberal majority, however, as the retiring justice Protasiewicz was elected to succeed aligned with conservatism while Protasiewicz is aligned with liberalism. In the court's 2023–2024 term with its new liberal majority, four of fourteen cases decided saw the court's justices split strictly along its liberal–conservative division. Conservative justice Brian Hagedorn, who had been a swing vote during the previous conservative majority, continued being somewhat independent from the court's other conservatives. Ahead of the 2025 elections, Wisconsin had the largest proportion of female justices of any U.S. state high court, with 6 of 7 justices (86% of its bench) being female (Hagedorn being its sole male justice). This would ultimately remain the case after the 2025 election as well, (Note: if a male justice had won the 2025 election, Wisconsin would have instead had a 2–5 split between female and male justices (71% female), identical to the gender divisions at the time on the Illinois, Michigan, and Nevada high courts which all were tied for the second–highest proportion of female justices) with a female candidate prevailing over a male opponent.

In April 2024, incumbent justice Ann Walsh Bradley (a member of the court's liberal majority) announced that she would not seek an additional term and instead retire when her term expired in 2025. This created an open-seat race. Since Bradley was a member of the court's liberal majority, the outcome of the election was poised to determine the majority ideological lean of the court. Historically, it has been rare for incumbents to lose reelection to the Wisconsin Supreme Court. Due to this, open-seat races have generally been regarded as valuable opportunities to potentially alter the court's ideological composition. Particularly since (excluding elections held to fill newly created seats) only 22 of the more than 135 elections held for the court have been for open seats. The 2023 and 2025 elections marked only the sixth instance in which two consecutive elections to the Wisconsin Supreme Court were for open seats. (Note: The five previous instances in Wisconsin state history in which consecutive supreme court elections have been for open seats were: 1961 and 1963; 1977 and 1978; 1980 and 1983; 1995 and 1996; 2018 and 2019)

Because only two candidates filed for the race, no primary election was held. Had a third candidate qualified for the ballot, a March primary would have been held. It is rare for contested Wisconsin Supreme Court races to be held without the need for a primary, with this being only the third instance going back to 1978 in which a contested race for the court did not require a primary.

== Candidates ==
Although Wisconsin Supreme Court elections are officially nonpartisan, news outlets have identified Susan Crawford as the liberal, Democratic-aligned candidate, and Brad Schimel as the conservative, Republican-aligned candidate.

=== Declared ===
- Susan Crawford, (Note: Described by media outlets as liberal) Dane County Circuit Court judge (2018–present)
- Brad Schimel, (Note: Described by media outlets as conservative) Waukesha County Circuit Court judge (2019–present) and former Wisconsin attorney general (2015–2019)

=== Withdrawn ===
- Ann Walsh Bradley, incumbent Supreme Court justice (1995–present) (endorsed Crawford)

=== Declined ===
- Pedro Colón, Wisconsin Court of Appeals judge (2023–present) and former state representative (1999–2011) (endorsed Crawford)
- Dan Kelly, (Note: Described by media outlets as conservative) former Wisconsin Supreme Court justice (2016–2020)
- Maria Lazar, (Note: Described by media outlets as conservative) Wisconsin Court of Appeals judge (2022–present) (endorsed Schimel)
- Chris Taylor, Wisconsin Court of Appeals judge (2023–present) and former state representative (2011–2019) (endorsed Crawford)

== Advertising ==
Both candidates and their respective supporters had spent heavily on advertising in this race, with total spending over $100 million, doubling the previous spending record set by the previous Supreme Court election. In 2015, Republican governor Scott Walker signed a bill to allow unlimited financial spending in all state elections. Multiple sources have cited this, as well as the 2010 U.S. Supreme Court decision Citizens United v. FEC, as major reasons both sides had been able to spend such large sums of money on the race.

Both candidates received heavy financial support from groups and individuals based outside of Wisconsin. Schimel criticized Crawford for advertising spending sponsored by wealthy individuals and billionaires such as Illinois governor JB Pritzker and philanthropist George Soros, while Crawford criticized the involvement of billionaire Elon Musk and his active support of Schimel.

=== Elon Musk (America PAC) ===
Musk's involvement in the race drew particular attention due to his especially large monetary contributions, his open, partisan support of Schimel as the "Republican" candidate in the nominally nonpartisan race, and his role in the second Trump Administration as the leader of the Department of Government Efficiency. Musk and groups tied to him have spent more than $25 million on television and digital advertisements and funding campaign field operations, making Musk the largest single contributor in any judicial election in United States history. An Elon Musk-funded group was linked to misleading ads designed to appear as if they came from Democrats, portraying Crawford as excessively progressive.

Musk additionally funded a petition drive offering financial compensation to voters who declare their opposition to activist judges, similar to a tactic he employed during the 2024 presidential election. Shortly before the election, Musk offered to "personally hand over" checks of one million dollars each to two voters who had already cast their ballots. Wisconsin attorney general Josh Kaul sued Musk to block the payments, decrying them as violations of state election law. Before the case could be reviewed by a judge, Musk deleted his original tweet and changed the criteria for the million dollar prize to remove the requirement of having already voted, mitigating the legal issue of paying people to vote. Kaul still pressed his case, citing the original announcement that Musk had deleted, but the courts declined to intervene as the major legal issue had been obviated. Musk went on to give out two one-million-dollar checks at a campaign rally in Green Bay, one to the chair of the Wisconsin College Republicans.

Multiple news sources noted that Musk's involvement in the race began shortly after Tesla, which Musk owns, filed a lawsuit against a Wisconsin law which barred them from operating car dealerships in the state.

== Campaigning ==
=== Schimel campaign ===
Separate from Musk, Schimel's campaign had attacked Crawford for being "soft on crime," drawing particular attention to her sentencing choices in child sexual assault cases during her tenure as a judge, in which Crawford applied sentences well below the maximum allowed, with several attacks calling her "Catch-and-Release Crawford." Crawford countered these attacks by pointing out that judges are required to consider the specific facts of each case, rather than always imposing the maximum sentence. She also noted that most sentences are based on the recommendations of the prosecutors. Republicans accused Crawford of "selling" two U.S. House seats to the Democrats in exchange for their support, referencing ongoing redistricting litigation. Schimel's campaign had specifically attacked comments made by U.S. House minority leader Hakeem Jeffries calling for Crawford's victory to facilitate the redrawing of the state's congressional districts.

Schimel had also actively curried the favor of Donald Trump at more private events, telling election canvassers he would be a "support network" for the President. Despite this, Schimel had repeated that financial or political support from figures such as Musk and Trump would not influence his decisions on the court. In addition to Musk, Schimel also received major contributions from Republican megadonors Diane Hendricks and Richard and Elizabeth Uihlein. Schimel had also repeated talking points related to conspiracy theories surrounding alleged voter fraud regarding the city of Milwaukee's counting of absentee ballots.

=== Crawford campaign ===
Crawford had spent much political energy decrying Elon Musk's involvement in the race, claiming he was trying to "buy" the Supreme Court seat. At the same time, she faced scrutiny over her own financial backing. In January 2025, she drew criticism for attending a briefing linked to Democratic donors, with opponents arguing it signaled a partisan approach to the judiciary. Crawford received over one million dollars in campaign donations from billionaire George Soros, as well as financial support from other prominent Democratic figures such as Illinois Governor J. B. Pritzker.

Crawford had also attacked Schimel for his tenure as Wisconsin attorney general, including the high number of untested rape kits early in his tenure. Schimel countered these attacks by noting that the backlog was cleared by the end of his term, which ended after he lost the 2018 election. In addition to her financial support from figures such as Soros and Pritzker, Crawford received additional campaign support from state and national Democrats. This included the operation of a "People vs. Musk" campaign throughout the state meant to highlight opposition to the billionaire's actions in the Trump administration and his involvement in the race. Minnesota governor and 2024 Democratic vice presidential nominee Tim Walz also held events in Wisconsin in support of Crawford.

== Endorsements ==
Susan Crawford

U.S. executive branch officials

- Eric Holder, former U.S. attorney general (2009–2015) (Democratic)
- Barack Obama, 44th president of the United States (2009–2017) (Democratic)

U.S. senators

- Tammy Baldwin, U.S. senator from Wisconsin (2013–present) (Democratic)
- Sherrod Brown, former U.S. senator from Ohio (2007–2025) (Democratic)
- Amy Klobuchar, U.S. senator from Minnesota (2007–present) (Democratic)
- Bernie Sanders, U.S. senator from Vermont (2007–present) (Independent)

U.S. representatives

- Gwen Moore, U.S. representative from Wisconsin's 4th district (2005–present) (Democratic)

Governors

- Tim Walz, governor of Minnesota (2019–present) and nominee for vice president in 2024 (Democratic)

Judicial officials

- Ann Walsh Bradley, Wisconsin Supreme Court justice (1995–2025)
- Louis B. Butler, former Wisconsin Supreme Court justice (2004–2008)
- Rebecca Dallet, Wisconsin Supreme Court justice (2018–present)
- Jill Karofsky, Wisconsin Supreme Court justice (2020–present)
- Janet Protasiewicz, Wisconsin Supreme Court justice (2023–present)
- 15 Wisconsin Court of Appeals judges

Individuals

- Jon Bauman, musician and activist
- Harry Dunn, former U.S. Capitol Police officer (2008–2023)
- Ken Martin, chair of the Democratic National Committee (2025–present)
- George Soros, investor and founder of Open Society Foundations
- Mini Timmaraju, president of Reproductive Freedom for All (2021–present)
- Ben Wikler, chair of the Wisconsin Democratic Party (2019–2025)

Labor unions

- Amalgamated Transit Union Local 998
- American Federation of State, County and Municipal Employees Council 32
- American Federation of Teachers Wisconsin
- Communications Workers of America District 4
- International Association of Sheet Metal, Air, Rail and Transportation Workers Local 18
- International Brotherhood of Electrical Workers Local 494 and Wisconsin State Conference
- International Union of Operating Engineers Local 420
- Madison Teachers Inc.
- North Central States Regional Council of Carpenters
- Service Employees International Union Wisconsin
- United Auto Workers Region 4
- Wisconsin AFL-CIO
- Wisconsin Education Association Council
- Wisconsin Laborers District Council

Newspapers

- The Shepherd Express
- Wisconsin State Journal

Organizations

- 350 Wisconsin Action
- Citizen Action of Wisconsin
- College Democrats of Wisconsin
- EMILY's List
- Fair Wisconsin
- Freedom From Religion Foundation Action Fund
- High School Democrats of Wisconsin
- Human Rights Campaign
- Indivisible Action
- Jewish Democratic Council of America
- Leadership Now Project
- MoveOn
- National Association of Social Workers Wisconsin
- National Democratic Redistricting Committee
- Our Wisconsin Revolution
- Planned Parenthood Advocates of Wisconsin
- Reproductive Freedom for All
- Sierra Club Wisconsin
- Sister District Wisconsin
- Social Security Works
- Swing Left
- Third Act Wisconsin
- Wisconsin Conservation Voters
- Young Democrats of Wisconsin

Political parties

- Wisconsin Democratic Party
- Wisconsin Working Families Party
Brad Schimel

U.S. executive branch officials

- Elon Musk, senior advisor to the president (2025)
- Donald Trump, 45th & 47th president of the United States (2017–2021, 2025–present) (Republican)

U.S. senators

- Ron Johnson, U.S. senator from Wisconsin (2011–present) (Republican)

U.S. representatives

- Scott Fitzgerald, U.S. representative from Wisconsin's 5th district (2021–present) (Republican)
- Glenn Grothman, U.S. representative from Wisconsin's 6th district (2015–present) (Republican)
- Bryan Steil, U.S. representative from Wisconsin's 1st district (2019–present) (Republican)
- Tom Tiffany, U.S. representative from Wisconsin's 7th district (2020–present) (Republican)
- Derrick Van Orden, U.S. representative from Wisconsin's 3rd district (2023–present) (Republican)
- Tony Wied, U.S. representative from Wisconsin's 8th district (2024–present) (Republican)

Judicial officials

- Rebecca Bradley, Wisconsin Supreme Court justice (2015–present)
- Shelley Grogan, Wisconsin Court of Appeals judge (2021–present)
- Maria Lazar, Wisconsin Court of Appeals judge (2022–present)

Individuals

- Charlie Kirk, founder of Turning Point USA
- Donald Trump Jr., businessman and executive vice president of The Trump Organization

Labor unions

- Milwaukee Police Association Local 21
- Milwaukee Professional Firefighters Association Local 215
- Waukesha County Police Chiefs Association

Organizations

- Americans for Prosperity Wisconsin
- National Rifle Association Political Victory Fund
- Wisconsin Realtors Association
- Wisconsin Young Republicans

Political parties

- Wisconsin Republican Party

== Debate ==
2025 Wisconsin Supreme Court election debates
No.	Date	Host	Moderators	Link	Candidates	
P Participant A Absent N Non-invitee I Invitee W Withdrawn						
P Participant A Absent N Non-invitee I Invitee W Withdrawn					Crawford	Schimel
1	March 12, 2025	WISN-TV	Matt Smith, Gerron Jordan		P	P

== Fundraising ==
Campaign finance reports as of June 30, 2025
Candidate	Raised	Spent	Cash on hand
Susan Crawford	$33,725,335	$33,429,502	$295,834
Brad Schimel	$15,736,903	$15,725,538	$31,382
Source: WI Ethics Commission

== Polling ==
Pollster	Dates administered	Sample size (Note: Key: A – all adults RV – registered voters LV – likely voters V – unclear)	Margin of error	Susan Crawford	Brad Schimel	Undecided
AtlasIntel	March 27–31, 2025	542 (LV)	± 4.0%	53%	46%	1%
Trafalgar Group (R)/InsiderAdvantage (R)	March 28–30, 2025	1,083 (LV)	± 2.9%	51%	49%	–
SoCal Strategies (R) (Note: Poll sponsored by On Point Politics, a conservative YouTube content creator)	March 25–26, 2025	500 (LV)	–	50%	42%	8%
SoCal Strategies (R)	March 25–26, 2025	500 (RV)	–	46%	40%	14%
Tyson Group (R) (Note: Poll conducted for Building America's Future, which supports Republican candidates)	March 17–18, 2025	600 (LV)	± 4.0%	48%	43%	9%
Tyson Group (R)	March 10–11, 2025	600 (LV)	± 4.0%	47%	39%	14%
OnMessage (R) (Note: Poll conducted for Wisconsin Manufacturers & Commerce)	March 9–10, 2025	600 (LV)	± 4.0%	47%	47%	5%
Tyson Group (R)	March 3–6, 2025	600 (LV)	± 4.0%	48%	35%	17%
RMG Research (R) (Note: Poll sponsored by the Napolitan Institute)	February 25–28, 2025	800 (RV)	± 3.5%	42%	35%	23% (Note: "Will not vote" with 6%)
TIPP Insights (R) (Note: Poll sponsored by League of American Workers)	February 7–11, 2025	1,045 (RV)	± 3.1%	38%	38%	24% (Note: "Unlikely to vote" with 3%)
TIPP Insights (R)	February 7–11, 2025	634 (LV)	± 4.0%	43%	45%	12%
RMG Research (R) (Note: Poll commissioned by the conservative Institute for Reforming Government.)	January 17–21, 2025	800 (RV)	± 3.5%	35%	40%	23%

== Results ==
General election, April 1, 2025
Candidate	Votes	%
Susan Crawford	1,301,137	55.02%
Brad Schimel	1,062,330	44.92%
Write-in	1,420	0.06%
Total votes	2,364,887	100.00%

=== By county ===
Crawford won 23 of the state's 72 counties, including 10 that were won by Donald Trump in the 2024 presidential election.

County	Susan Crawford		Brad Schimel		Scattering votes		Margin		Total votes cast
County	#	%	#	%	#	%	#	%	Total votes cast
Adams	3,600	41.02%	5,171	58.92%	6	0.07%	−1,571	−17.90%	8,777
Ashland	3,869	57.82%	2,816	42.08%	7	0.10%	1,053	15.74%	6,692
Barron	7,037	39.62%	10,719	60.35%	6	0.03%	−3,682	−20.73%	17,762
Bayfield	5,228	60.49%	3,413	39.49%	2	0.02%	1,815	21.00%	8,643
Brown	51,403	51.57%	48,228	48.38%	54	0.05%	3,175	3.19%	99,685
Buffalo	2,310	41.36%	3,227	57.78%	48	0.86%	−917	−16.42%	5,585
Burnett	2,728	37.44%	4,559	62.56%	0	0.00%	−1,831	−25.12%	7,287
Calumet	9,743	44.20%	12,288	55.75%	12	0.05%	−2,545	−11.55%	22,043
Chippewa	11,580	45.17%	14,036	54.76%	18	0.07%	−2,456	−9.59%	25,634
Clark	3,815	36.47%	6,639	63.46%	8	0.07%	−2,824	−26.99%	10,462
Columbia	13,248	54.40%	11,091	45.54%	16	0.06%	2,157	8.86%	24,355
Crawford	3,354	51.21%	3,191	48.72%	4	0.07%	163	2.49%	6,549
Dane	234,129	81.66%	52,372	18.27%	202	0.07%	181,757	63.39%	286,703
Dodge	12,796	37.58%	21,251	62.42%	0	0.00%	−8,455	−24.84%	34,047
Door	8,592	56.10%	6,716	43.85%	7	0.05%	1,876	12.25%	15,315
Douglas	9,501	59.10%	6,565	40.83%	11	0.07%	2,936	18.27%	16,077
Dunn	8,545	49.88%	8,586	50.12%	0	0.00%	−41	−0.24%	17,131
Eau Claire	27,618	62.79%	16,334	37.13%	36	0.08%	11,284	25.66%	43,988
Florence	557	27.45%	1,472	72.55%	0	0.00%	−915	−45.10%	2,029
Fond du Lac	15,634	39.60%	23,842	60.40%	1	0.00%	−8,208	−20.80%	39,477
Forest	1,196	35.63%	2,159	64.31%	2	0.06%	−963	−28.68%	3,357
Grant	8,722	49.76%	8,796	50.18%	10	0.06%	−74	−0.42%	17,528
Green	9,343	58.35%	6,662	41.60%	8	0.05%	2,681	16.75%	16,013
Green Lake	2,626	35.75%	4,718	64.23%	2	0.02%	−2,092	−28.48%	7,346
Iowa	6,671	61.76%	4,123	38.17%	7	0.07%	2,548	23.59%	10,801
Iron	1,174	42.75%	1,572	57.25%	0	0.00%	−398	−15.00%	2,746
Jackson	3,499	48.72%	3,683	51.28%	0	0.00%	−184	−2.56%	7,182
Jefferson	16,230	46.92%	18,334	53.00%	27	0.08%	−2,104	−6.08%	34,591
Juneau	3,850	40.80%	5,579	59.12%	7	0.08%	−1,729	−18.32%	9,436
Kenosha	30,434	52.68%	27,277	47.22%	55	0.10%	3,157	5.46%	57,766
Kewaunee	3,191	37.33%	5,353	62.62%	5	0.05%	−2,162	−25.29%	8,549
La Crosse	30,540	62.98%	17,954	37.02%	0	0.00%	12,586	25.96%	48,494
Lafayette	2,900	48.62%	3,065	51.38%	0	0.00%	−165	−2.76%	5,965
Langlade	2,859	37.21%	4,825	62.79%	0	0.00%	−1,966	−25.58%	7,684
Lincoln	4,617	42.02%	6,363	57.91%	8	0.07%	−1,746	−15.89%	10,988
Manitowoc	13,919	42.78%	18,596	57.15%	22	0.07%	−4,677	−14.37%	32,537
Marathon	23,964	44.91%	29,369	55.04%	29	0.05%	−5,405	−10.13%	53,362
Marinette	5,656	36.02%	10,031	63.88%	16	0.10%	−4,375	−27.86%	15,703
Marquette	2,529	39.51%	3,870	60.46%	2	0.03%	−1,341	−20.95%	6,401
Menominee	837	81.42%	191	18.58%	0	0.00%	646	62.84%	1,028
Milwaukee	227,345	74.57%	77,299	25.35%	241	0.08%	150,046	49.22%	304,885
Monroe	6,663	44.40%	8,340	55.57%	4	0.03%	−1,677	−11.17%	15,007
Oconto	5,386	32.30%	11,279	67.64%	11	0.06%	−5,893	−35.34%	16,676
Oneida	7,733	45.57%	9,222	54.34%	16	0.09%	−1,488	−8.77%	16,971
Outagamie	37,732	50.67%	36,740	49.33%	0	0.00%	992	1.34%	74,472
Ozaukee	22,814	48.35%	24,352	51.61%	21	0.04%	−1,538	-3.26%	47,187
Pepin	1,215	41.72%	1,697	58.28%	0	0.00%	−482	−16.56%	2,912
Pierce	8,096	48.75%	8,504	51.21%	7	0.04%	−408	−2.46%	16,607
Polk	7,400	39.88%	11,157	60.12%	0	0.00%	−3,757	−20.24%	18,557
Portage	17,476	57.67%	12,812	42.28%	13	0.05%	4,664	15.39%	30,301
Price	2,459	38.88%	3,865	61.12%	0	0.00%	−1,406	−22.24%	6,324
Racine	37,235	50.57%	36,323	49.34%	66	0.09%	912	0.91%	73,624
Richland	3,309	52.07%	3,043	47.88%	3	0.05%	266	4.19%	6,355
Rock	35,186	61.19%	22,268	38.73%	47	0.08%	12,918	22.46%	57,501
Rusk	2,107	36.61%	3,645	63.34%	3	0.05%	−1,538	−26.73%	5,755
Sauk	14,548	57.14%	10,913	42.86%	0	0.00%	3,635	14.28%	25,461
Sawyer	3,464	44.96%	4,234	54.96%	6	0.08%	−770	−10.00%	7,704
Shawano	5,467	36.16%	9,643	63.79%	7	0.05%	−4,176	−27.63%	15,117
Sheboygan	21,280	45.81%	25,130	54.10%	38	0.09%	−3,850	−8.29%	46,448
St. Croix	18,477	45.92%	21,738	54.02%	23	0.06%	−3,291	−8.10%	40,238
Taylor	2,176	29.25%	5,264	70.75%	0	0.00%	−3,088	−41.50%	7,440
Trempealeau	5,068	47.04%	5,702	52.93%	3	0.03%	−634	−5.89%	10,773
Vernon	6,612	53.68%	5,696	46.24%	10	0.08%	916	7.44%	12,318
Vilas	4,572	41.09%	6,541	58.79%	13	0.12%	−1,969	−17.70%	11,126
Walworth	18,461	43.84%	23,620	56.09%	31	0.07%	−5,159	−12.25%	42,112
Washburn	3,129	40.42%	4,609	59.53%	4	0.05%	−1,480	−19.11%	7,742
Washington	21,906	33.75%	42,972	66.20%	34	0.05%	−21,066	−32.45%	64,912
Waukesha	85,130	42.30%	116,000	57.65%	98	0.05%	−30,870	−15.35%	201,228
Waupaca	7,706	38.43%	12,334	61.50%	14	0.07%	−4,628	−23.07%	20,054
Waushara	3,498	35.39%	6,386	64.61%	0	0.00%	−2,888	−29.22%	9,884
Winnebago	34,605	53.49%	30,047	46.44%	48	0.07%	4,558	7.05%	64,700
Wood	12,838	44.61%	15,919	55.32%	21	0.07%	−3,081	−10.71%	28,778
Totals	1,301,137	55.02%	1,062,330	44.92%	1,420	0.06%	238,807	10.10%	2,364,887

== Aftermath ==
=== Analysis ===
Republican Waupun mayor Rohn Bishop remarked that "Donald Trump does two things wonderfully: He gets people to turn out to vote for him and he gets liberals to turn out and vote against anyone he supports. The problem is that he can never turn out conservatives to vote for his candidate when he's not on the ballot." He also said that the race "throws up a bunch of warning signs for the midterm election," and "I thought maybe Elon coming could turn these people to go out and vote, I think [Musk] helped get out voters in that he may have turned out more voters against [Schimel]."

Unlike the 2024 United States presidential election, the turnout among voters of color for Democrats was "unexpectedly high." Democrats argued that Musk's involvement in the race and their choice to campaign against him helped them win the election.

A Politico analysis found that Democrats maintained a turnout advantage even in the hotly contested race, with Musk's millions of funding not enough to compel Republicans to vote in "as great numbers in a spring election." In a troubling trend for Republicans, voting levels were similar to that of midterms which suggests a favorable electorate for Democrats leading into the 2026 midterms.

Three of the preceding four Wisconsin Supreme Court elections (2018, 2020, and 2023; with 2019 being the exception) had also seen a liberal defeat a conservative by about 55% to 45%, despite significant variance in overall voter turnout. Even in his home county of Waukesha, Schimel received 58% of the vote, less than Trump's 59% in 2024.

=== Impact ===
Crawford's victory is anticipated to have secured liberal control of the Court until at least the 2028 election, as the 2026 and 2027 elections will both be for conservative-held seats.

Elon Musk's public-facing role in Republican politics greatly decreased following the election, which some have tied to Schimel's defeat and Musk's high-profile backing of him. Musk's popularity had greatly decreased in the previous months, and Democrats had aggressively campaigned against him both in this race and other special elections held in the first half of 2025. Few expected his role in funding Republican campaigns to disappear, but many saw the move as a political tactic to decrease Musk's perceived "toxic" impact on candidates.

== See also ==
- 2025 Wisconsin elections

== Notes ==
Partisan clients
