= Rukmini (disambiguation) =

Rukmini is a Hindu goddess.

Rukmini may also refer to:

- Rukmini (given name), an Indian female given name
- Rukmini (film), a 1997 Indian film
- Rukmini Devi Temple, in Gujarat, India
- Rukmini Foundation, a Pittsburgh-based non-profit organization

== See also ==
- Rukmani (disambiguation)
- Rukmini Swayamvar, a 1946 Bollywood film
- Krishna Rukmini, a 1988 Indian Kannada-language film
- Rugmini, a 1989 Indian film
- Rugmini Gopalakrishnan, Indian musician
