= Lori Kornblum =

American judge

Judge of the Wisconsin Court of Appeals District II
- In office January 3, 2022 – July 31, 2022
- Appointed by: Tony Evers
- Preceded by: Paul F. Reilly
- Succeeded by: Maria S. Lazar

Personal details
- Education: Yale University; UC Berkeley School of Law
- Profession: lawyer, judge
- Website: Campaign website

Lori Sue Kornblum is an American lawyer and judge who served as a judge of the Wisconsin Court of Appeals for the Waukesha-based District II in 2022. She was appointed in 2021 by Governor Tony Evers.

== Biography ==
Lori Kornblum received her undergraduate education from Yale University and graduated magna cum laude in 1979. She went on to attend UC Berkeley School of Law and earned her J.D. in 1982. Following her graduation, she was admitted to the State Bar of Wisconsin and was employed as a law clerk for Wisconsin Supreme Court judge Shirley Abrahamson, serving through the 1982–1983 court term.

After a few years in private legal practice, she went to work as an assistant district attorney in Milwaukee County in 1992. During her 22 years with the district attorney's office, she specialized in child protection, sexual assault, and juvenile justice cases.

She returned to private practice in 2014, specializing in cases of child abuse, disability rights, and parental rights.

Since 2008, she has also worked an adjunct professor at Milwaukee Area Technical College, Marquette University Law School, and Northeastern University Law School.

On November 30, 2021, Governor Tony Evers announced he would appoint Kornblum to the Wisconsin Court of Appeals to replace retiring judge Paul F. Reilly. She took office January 3, 2022, and stood for election to a full term in the 2022 spring general election. She lost the election to Maria S. Lazar.

Legal offices
Preceded by Paul F. Reilly	Judge of the Wisconsin Court of Appeals District II; January 3, 2022 – July 31, 2022	Succeeded by Maria S. Lazar
