= Rukmani =

Rukmani may refer to:

- Rukmani (name)
- Rukmani Kund, a reservoir surrounded by mountains in Himachal Pradesh, India
- Bhama Rukmani, a 1980 Indian Tamil-language drama film
- Rukmani Kalyanam, a 1936 Indian Tamil-language film

== See also ==
- Rukmini (disambiguation)
