= 1963 Wisconsin Supreme Court election =

- April 2, 1963

Candidate	Bruce F. Beilfuss	Harry E. Larsen
Popular vote	411,428	224,022
Percentage	64.75%	35.25%
Justice before election
Timothy Brown
Elected Justice
Bruce F. Beilfuss

The 1963 Wisconsin Supreme Court election was held on Tuesday, April 2, 1963 to elect a justice to a full ten-year seat the Wisconsin Supreme Court. Bruce F. Beilfuss won an open race to succeed retiring justice Timothy Brown.

== Background ==
As a result of the mandatory retirement age for state judges of 70 that was in effect at the time of the election, incumbent justice Timothy Brown was precluded from seeking re-election in 1963. This made the election an open-seat race. The 1961 and 1963 elections were the first instance in the court's history in which multiple consecutive elections were for open seats (without an incumbent running). As of 2026, this has only occurred in five further instances. (Note: The five subsequent instances of this have been: 1977 and 1978; 1980 and 1983; 1995 and 1996; 2018 and 2019; 2023, 2025, 2026)

== Candidates ==
Advanced to the general election

- Bruce F. Beilfuss, Wisconsin Circuit Court justice
- Harry E. Larsen, Superior-based attorney

Eliminated in the primary

- Christ Alexopoulos, Milwaukee-based attorney and perennial judicial candidate (Note: Alexopolous had unsuccessfully run For Wisconsin Supreme Court in 1959 and 1961; had unsuccessfully run for Circuit Court in 1960 and 1962; and had run other civil court campaigns as far back as 1954. He would later unsuccessfully run again for Supreme Court in 1974, 1975, and 1976)
- Davis Donnelly
- William H. Evans

== Results ==
Wisconsin Supreme Court Election, 1963
Party	Candidate	Votes	%
Nonpartisan Primary, March 5, 1963
Nonpartisan	Bruce F. Beilfuss	126,765	53.36
Nonpartisan	Harry E. Larsen	38,374	16.15
Nonpartisan	William H. Evans	31,071	13.08
Nonpartisan	Davis Donnelly	25,241	10.63
Nonpartisan	Christ Alexopoulos	16,095	6.78
Total votes		237,546	100
General Election, April 2, 1963
Nonpartisan	Bruce F. Beilfuss	411,428	64.75
Nonpartisan	Harry E. Larsen	224,022	35.25
Plurality		187,406	29.49
Total votes		635,450	100
