= 2025 Wisconsin elections =

Elections in the U.S. state of Wisconsin

- April 1, 2025

The 2025 Wisconsin spring election was held in the U.S. state of Wisconsin on April 1, 2025. The race seen as most significant was an open seat on the Wisconsin Supreme Court, which became the most expensive judicial race in history. The election also included a state-wide race for Superintendent of Public Instruction. Several other nonpartisan local and judicial offices were also on the ballot, as were many local school funding referendums. The 2025 Wisconsin spring primary was held on February 18, 2025.

The Democratic Party of Wisconsin was seen as broadly victorious across the state's Spring elections. In the Supreme Court race, the Democrats' preferred candidate, Susan M. Crawford, defeated the Republicans' preferred candidate, Brad Schimel, maintaining the liberal 4–3 majority on the court. The Democrats also supported the incumbent state superintendent, Jill Underly, who won a second four-year term. Additionally, Democrats saw success in many local elections, including in emerging bellwether Winnebago County, where former Assembly minority leader Gordon Hintz defeated a Republican-backed incumbent to become county executive. Democrats also supported a number of successful school funding referendums throughout the state.

On the same ballot, however, voters ratified a Republican-supported amendment to the Constitution of Wisconsin, which enshrined a photo identification requirement to vote. The requirement was already in place in Wisconsin due to existing state laws; in effect, the amendment made the requirement harder to remove.

== State offices ==
=== Executive ===
==== Superintendent of Public Instruction ====
Underly: 50–60% 60–70% 70–80% Kinser: 50–60% 60–70%

A regularly scheduled election for superintendent of Public Instruction of Wisconsin was on the ballot for the general election on April 1, 2025. The incumbent Superintendent Jill Underly, first elected in 2021, won her second four-year term, defeating education consultant Brittany Kinser.

Sauk County Superintendent Jeff Wright also ran, but was eliminated in the February 18 nonpartisan primary.

2025 Wisconsin superintendent of Public Instruction election
Party	Candidate	Votes	%	±%
Nonpartisan primary, February 18, 2025
Nonpartisan	Jill Underly (incumbent)	177,626	37.90%	+10.67%
Nonpartisan	Brittany Kinser	161,636	34.49%	
Nonpartisan	Jeff Wright	128,292	27.38%	
Write-in		1,055	0.23%	
Total votes		468,609	100.00%	+43.71%
General election, April 1, 2025
Nonpartisan	Jill Underly (incumbent)	1,148,427	52.71%	−4.86%
Nonpartisan	Brittany Kinser	1,022,489	46.93%	
Nonpartisan	Adrianne Melby (write-in)	348	0.02%	
Write-in		7,305	0.34%	
Plurality		125,938	5.78%	-9.52%
Total votes		2,178,569	100.00%	+138.24%

=== Judicial ===
==== State Supreme Court ====
Crawford: 50–60% 60–70% 70–80% 80–90% Schimel: 50–60% 60–70% 70–80%

A regularly scheduled Wisconsin Supreme Court election was on the ballot for the general election on April 1, 2025, for a ten-year term on the court. The incumbent judge, Ann Walsh Bradley, did not run for re-election, retiring after 30 years on the court. Dane County circuit judge Susan M. Crawford defeated Waukesha County circuit judge and former state attorney general Brad Schimel, maintaining the 4–3 liberal majority on the court.

The 2025 Wisconsin Supreme Court election became the most expensive judicial race in United States history, surpassing the 2023 Wisconsin Supreme Court election. Total spending on the race reached nearly $100 million; billionaire Elon Musk—at the time a senior advisor to U.S. President Donald Trump—spent more than $25 million through his political action committees on behalf of Brad Schimel.

Wisconsin Supreme Court election, 2025
Party	Candidate	Votes	%	±%
General election, April 1, 2025
Nonpartisan	Susan Crawford	1,301,137	55.02%	
Nonpartisan	Brad Schimel	1,062,330	44.92%	
	Scattering	1,420	0.06%	
Plurality		238,807	10.10%	-0.94pp
Total votes		2,364,887	100.0%	+28.28%

==== State court of appeals ====
Three seats on the Wisconsin Court of Appeals were on the ballot for the general election on April 1, 2025.

- In District II, incumbent judge Mark Gundrum was unopposed for a third six-year term. He was appointed to the court by Governor Scott Walker in 2011 and won election in 2013 and 2019 without opposition.
- In District III, incumbent judge Lisa K. Stark was unopposed for a third six-year term. She was elected without opposition in 2013 and re-elected without opposition in 2019. After winning her first election, she was appointed to begin her term early due to a vacancy.
- In District IV, incumbent judge Jennifer E. Nashold was unopposed for a second six-year term. She was first elected without opposition in 2019.

==== State circuit courts ====
Thirty eight of the state's 261 circuit court seats were on the ballot for the general election on April 1, 2025. Only eight seats were contested; five incumbent judges faced a challenger, three were defeated.

- In Jefferson County's branch 1 race, incumbent judge Will Gruber defeated a challenge from attorney Jack Chavez.
- In Jefferson County's branch 2 race, incumbent judge Theresa Beck defeated a challenge from attorney Jennifer Weber.
- In La Crosse County, attorney Joe Veenstra defeated family court commissioner Eric Sanford to succeed retiring judge Ramona Gonzalez.
- In Marinette County, incumbent judge Peggy Miller defeated district attorney DeShea Morrow.
- In Racine County, public defender Jamie McClendon defeated incumbent judge Jon Fredrickson.
- In St. Croix County, deputy district attorney Brian Smestad defeated county corporation counsel Heather Amos to succeed retiring judge Edward Vlack. Attorney James Johnson was eliminated in the primary.
- In Waukesha County's branch 4 race, assistant district attorney David Maas defeated incumbent judge Bridget Schoenborn.
- In Waukesha County's branch 6 race, assistant district attorney Zach Wittchow defeated former circuit judge Fred Strampe to succeed retiring judge and Supreme Court candidate Brad Schimel.

Circuit	Branch	Incumbent		Elected			Defeated			Defeated in primary
Circuit	Branch	Name	Entered office	Name	Votes	%	Name	Votes	%	Name(s)
Brown	3	Tammy Jo Hock	2012	Tammy Jo Hock	67,062	98.72%	--Unopposed--			
Brown	4	Samantha Wagner	2024	Samantha Wagner	66,714	99.11%	--Unopposed--			
Brown	7	Timothy A. Hinkfuss	2007	Timothy A. Hinkfuss	67,793	99.01%	--Unopposed--			
Crawford		Lukas Steiner	2024	Lukas Steiner	4,894	99.13%	--Unopposed--			
Dane	2	Payal Khandhar	2024	Payal Khandhar	192,351	98.91%	--Unopposed--			
Dane	16	Rhonda L. Lanford	2013	Rhonda L. Lanford	191,580	98.95%	--Unopposed--			
Dodge	3	Joseph G. Sciascia	2013	Chad Wozniak	23,646	100.0%	--Unopposed--			
Eau Claire	2	Douglas Hoffer	2024	Douglas Hoffer	29,879	98.63%	--Unopposed--			
Green	2	Jane Bucher	2024	Jane Bucher	11,315	98.89%	--Unopposed--			
Jefferson	1	William V. Gruber	2018	William V. Gruber	17,939	65.96%	John A. Chavez	9,083	33.40%	
Jefferson	2	Theresa Beck	2024	Theresa Beck	13,698	51.50%	Jennifer L. Weber	12,600	47.37%	
La Crosse	1	Ramona A. Gonzalez	1995	Joe Veenstra	20,162	52.12%	Eric S. Sanford	18,525	47.88%	
La Crosse	2	Elliott Levine	2007	Elliott Levine	34,046	100.0%	--Unopposed--			
La Crosse	4	Scott L. Horne	2007	Scott L. Horne	34,930	100.0%	--Unopposed--			
Lafayette		Jenna Gill	2024	Jenna Gill	5,173	100.0%	--Unopposed--			
Lincoln	2	Robert Russell	2013	Jessica Fehrenbach	8,347	98.85%	--Unopposed--			
Manitowoc	1	Mark R. Rohrer	2013	Mark R. Rohrer	24,777	99.15%	--Unopposed--			
Marinette	1	Peggy L. Miller	2024	Peggy L. Miller	6,971	50.30%	DeShea D. Morrow	6,845	49.39%	
Marinette	2	James A. Morrison	2012	James A. Morrison	12,475	99.08%	--Unopposed--			
Marquette		Chad A. Hendee	2019	Chad A. Hendee	4,786	99.25%	--Unopposed--			
Milwaukee	6	John Remington	2024	John Remington	187,485	98.24%	--Unopposed--			
Milwaukee	11	David C. Swanson	2013	David C. Swanson	187,223	98.40%	--Unopposed--			
Milwaukee	26	William S. Pocan	2006	William S. Pocan	187,988	98.37%	--Unopposed--			
Milwaukee	36	Laura A. Crivello	2018	Laura A. Crivello	189,038	98.55%	--Unopposed--			
Milwaukee	40	Danielle L. Shelton	2019	Danielle L. Shelton	187,136	98.55%	--Unopposed--			
Milwaukee	41	Lena Taylor	2024	Lena Taylor	195,351	97.67%	--Unopposed--			
Monroe	1	Todd L. Ziegler	2007	Todd L. Ziegler	12,356	99.17%	--Unopposed--			
Ozaukee	1	Adam Y. Gerol	2024	Adam Y. Gerol	30,790	98.42%	--Unopposed--			
Ozaukee	2	Steve Cain	2019	Steve Cain	30,376	98.57%	--Unopposed--			
Racine	4	Scott Craig	2024	Scott Craig	46,107	98.00%	--Unopposed--			
Racine	7	Jon E. Fredrickson	2018	Jamie M. McClendon	30,187 (Note: Post-recount total)	49.73%	Jon E. Fredrickson	30,140	49.66%	
Rock	1	Karl R. Hanson	2018	Karl R. Hanson	37,039	98.75%	--Unopposed--			
Rock	2	Derrick A. Grubb	2018	Derrick A. Grubb	36,741	98.63%	--Unopposed--			
St. Croix	2	Edward F. Vlack III	2001	Brian T. Smestad	19,500	53.61%	Heather M. Amos	16,732	46.00%	James Jamie Johnson
Waukesha	1	Michael O. Bohren	2000	Scott Wagner	129,712	98.49%	--Unopposed--			
Waukesha	4	Bridget Schoenborn	2024	David Maas	83,846	51.40%	Bridget Schoenborn	78,395	48.06%	
Waukesha	6	Brad D. Schimel	2018	Zach Wittchow	93,838	57.88%	Fred Strampe	67,570	41.68%	
Wood	1	Gregory J. Jerabek	2024	Gregory J. Jerabek	20,929	99.27%	--Unopposed--			

=== Ballot measures ===
==== Spring Question 1 ====
Question 1
- April 1, 2025
- Photographic identification for voting. Shall section 1m of article III of the constitution be created to require that voters present valid photographic identification verifying their identity in order to vote in any election, subject to exceptions which may be established by law?

Results
Choice	Votes	%
Yes	1,437,326	62.78%
No	852,107	37.22%
Total votes	2,288,134	100.00%
- Yes: 50–60% 60–70% 70–80% 80–90% No: 50–60% 60–70%

A constitutional amendment was ratified by voters at the Spring general election, April 1, 2025. The amendment added a voter ID requirement for voting in Wisconsin. Wisconsin law already required that an active form of photo identification be submitted to vote.

The question read:

Photographic identification for voting. Shall section 1m of article III of the constitution be created to require that voters present valid photographic identification verifying their identity in order to vote in any election, subject to exceptions which may be established by law?

== Local offices ==
=== Dane County ===
==== Dane County executive ====
A regularly scheduled county executive election was held in Dane County, Wisconsin, concurrent with the general election on April 1, 2025. The incumbent, Melissa Agard, who was first elected in the 2024 special election, won a full four-year term, defeating furniture salesman Stephen Ratzlaff. Ratzlaff was previously a candidate for state assembly in 2020 and 2021.

Dane County Executive election, 2025
Party	Candidate	Votes	%
Nonpartisan	Melissa Agard (incumbent)	199,932	80.81%
Nonpartisan	Stephen Ratzlaff	46,432	18.77%
Write-in		1,059	0.43%
Total votes		247,423	100.00%

==== DeForest Village Board ====
A recall election was held on September 16, 2025 in DeForest, Wisconsin which saw the recall of incumbent village board trustee Bill Landgraff. The recall was initiated due to allegations that Landgraff intimidated, stalked and disrespected village residents, as well as due to his support for removing fluoride from the municipal water supply. 2024 write-in candidate Alicia Williams and local resident Stacey Petersen announced campaigns to unseat Landgraff, who also ran in the recall. Williams defeated Landgraff by a 68-point margin, with Petersen coming in third by a margin of four votes.

DeForest recall primary, 2025
Party	Candidate	Votes	%
Nonpartisan	Alicia Williams	1,884	78.36%
Nonpartisan	William Landgraf (incumbent)	260	10.82%
Nonpartisan	Stephen Ratzlaff	256	10.65%
Write-in		4	0.17%
Total votes		2,404	100.00%

=== La Crosse County ===
A regularly scheduled mayoral election was held in La Crosse, Wisconsin, concurrent with the general election on April 1, 2025. The incumbent mayor, Mitch Reynolds, did not run for re-election. Local organizer and former school board member Shaundel Washington-Spivey was elected mayor, defeating city councilmember Chris Kahlow. Washington-Spivey is La Crosse's first black mayor and first LGBTQ mayor. Nonprofit executive Vicki Markussen and realtor Ellie McLoone were eliminated in the primary.

La Crosse, Wisconsin mayoral election, 2025
Party	Candidate	Votes	%	±%
Nonpartisan primary, February 18, 2025
Nonpartisan	Shaundel Washington-Spivey	1,842	29.95%	
Nonpartisan	Christine Kahlow	1,663	27.04%	
Nonpartisan	Vicki Markussen	1,618	26.30%	
Nonpartisan	Ellie McLoone	1,014	16.49%	
Write-in		14	0.23%	
Total votes		6,151	100.00%	
General election, April 1, 2025
Nonpartisan	Shaundel Washington-Spivey	9,012	50.82%	
Nonpartisan	Christine Kahlow	8,561	48.27%	
Write-in		161	0.91%	
Plurality		451	2.55%	
Total votes		19,347	100.00%	

=== Manitowoc County ===
A regularly scheduled mayoral election was held in Manitowoc, Wisconsin, concurrent with the general election on April 1, 2025. The incumbent mayor, Justin Nickels, was re-elected to his fifth four-year term, defeating small business owner Jason Prigge.

=== Milwaukee County ===
A special election was held to fill in Milwaukee, concurrent with the general election on April 1, 2025. The election was to fill a vacant seat on the Milwaukee Common Council, vacated due to the death of Jonathan Brostoff. Union executive Alex Brower won the special election to serve the remainder of the term expiring April 17, 2028. Brower defeated salesman Daniel Bauman; six other candidates were eliminated in the primary, held concurrently with the spring primary election: customer service manager Josh Anderson, gardener Franco Ferrante, perennial candidate Ieshuh Griffin, business owner Nas Musa, attorney Alexander Kostal, and orthopedic technician Bryant Junco.

=== Sheboygan County ===
A regularly scheduled mayoral election was held in Sheboygan, Wisconsin, concurrent with the general election on April 1, 2025. The incumbent mayor, Ryan Sorenson, was re-elected to his second four-year term, defeating city councilmember John Belanger.

=== Winnebago County ===
==== Oshkosh mayor ====
A regularly scheduled mayoral election was held in Oshkosh, Wisconsin, concurrent with the general election on April 1, 2025. The incumbent mayor Matt Mugerauer, first elected in 2023, was re-elected without opposition.

==== Winnebago County executive ====
A regularly scheduled county executive election was held in Winnebago County, Wisconsin, concurrent with the general election on April 1, 2025. Former Assembly minority leader Gordon Hintz was elected county executive, defeating the incumbent Jon Doemel. Winnebago County Sheriff John Matz was eliminated in the primary.

== See also ==
- Elections in Wisconsin
- Clarke v. Wisconsin Elections Commission
- Bilingual elections requirement for Wisconsin (per Voting Rights Act Amendments of 2006)
- Political party strength in Wisconsin
