= 1978 Wisconsin Supreme Court election =

- April 4, 1978

Candidate	John Louis Coffey	James Rice
Popular vote	358,445	283,589
Percentage	55.83%	44.17%
- Coffey: 50–60% 60–70% 70–80% Rice: 50–60% 60–70% 70–80%
Justice before election
Leo B. Hanley
Elected Justice
John Louis Coffey

The 1978 Wisconsin Supreme Court election was held April 4, 1978. With incumbent justice Leo B. Hanley retiring, the election was an open-seat race. John Louis Coffey (an ideological conservative, like Hanley) defeated James Rice (an ideological liberal).

== Background ==
Incumbent justice Leo B. Hanley did not seek reelection in 1978, thus the election was an open-seat race.

The 1977 and 1978 elections was the second instance in the court's history in which multiple consecutive elections were for open seats (without an incumbent running). (Note: Preceding instance was the 1961 and 1963 elections) As of 2026, this has only occurred in four further instances. (Note: The four subsequent instances of this have been: 1980 and 1983; 1995 and 1996; 2018 and 2019; 2023, 2025, and 2026)

Ahead of the election, the court had 3 conservatives, 3 liberals, and 1 swing vote. Outgoing justice Hanley was a conservative.

There was no primary held, because only two candidates ran. Had a third candidate qualified for the ballot, a primary would have been held. It is rare for contested Wisconsin Supreme Court races to be held without the need for a primary, with the next such instance not occurring until 2019.

== Candidates ==
- John Louis Coffey, Milwaukee County judge
- James W. Rice, Monroe County judge

== Campaign ==
Coffey was regarded to be a conservative candidate, while Rice was a liberal candidate. Both were first-time contenders for the state supreme court, though Coffey had considered running in 1976.

When launching his candidacy in October 1977, Rice stated that he would center his campaign upon a pledge to champion judicial efficiency. This included a promise to resolve issues that contributing to delays in the state's courts. Rice was the chairman of a study committee that was drafting helping the legislature draft legislation to reform the judiciary, and championed such reforms as a master calendar system for caseloads. Coffey argued against this, characterizing a master calendar system attempted in Milwaukee County's courts as having been a failure. Rice also argued for reforms to juvenile punishment, including community facilities for juvenile delinquents, a new juvenile criminal code, and more judicial discretion to allow judges to assign work programs in lieu of imprisonment during sentencing. Coffey strongly differed from this too, arguing that juvenile delinquents were being treated too softly and that the lack of harder punishment for juvenile offenders was a major cause of juvenile crime.

== Results ==
Coffey's victory meant that the ideological balance of the court was unchanged.

Coffey had led in most cities, while Rice performed better in rural areas.

1978 Wisconsin Supreme Court election
Party	Candidate	Votes	%
General election (April 4, 1978)
Nonpartisan	John L. Coffey	358,445	55.83
Nonpartisan	James W. Rice	283,589	44.17
Plurality		74856	11.66
Total votes		642,034	100
