= Rukmani (name) =

Rukmini is a Sanskrit feminine given name and a surname that may refer to the following notable people:

Given name

- Rukmani Bai, Indian politician
- Rukmani Devi (1923–1978), Sri Lankan film actress and singer
- Rukmani Gounder, New Zealand economist

Surname

- Kumari Rukmani (1929–2007), Indian actress and dancer
- T. S. Rukmani, Indian Sanskrit scholar

== See also ==
- Rukmini (given name)
