= Gordon Myse =

American lawyer

Gordon Myse is a former judge of the Wisconsin Court of Appeals and Wisconsin Circuit Court. He unsuccessfully ran in the 1983 Wisconsin Supreme Court election.

== Biography ==
Myse was born in Kaukauna, Wisconsin in 1935. He is a graduate of Beloit College and the University of Michigan Law School. Myse is married with three children.

== Career ==
After being stationed at Marine Corps Base Camp Pendleton while serving with the United States Navy Reserve, Myse began practicing law in Appleton, Wisconsin. He later became Family Court Commissioner of Outagamie County, Wisconsin. After returning to private practice for a time, he was appointed to the Court of Appeals by Governor Tony Earl in 1986. He retired from full-time judiciary duties in 1999, but remained on as a reserve judge.
