= Rukmini (given name) =

Rukmini is a Hindic feminine given name that may refer to the following notable people:

- Rukmini Bhaya Nair, Indian linguist, poet, writer and critic
- Rukmini Callimachi (born 1973), Romanian-American journalist
- Rukmini Chaudhary, Nepalese politician
- Rukmini Devi Arundale (1904–1986), Indian theosophist, dancer and choreographer
- Rukmini Lakshmipathi (1892–1951), Indian independence activist
- Rukmini Maitra, Indian model and actress
- Rukmini Sukarno (born c.1943), a daughter of the Indonesian President Sukarno
- Rukmini Timmaraju (born 1973), American reproductive rights advocate
- Rukmini Varma (born 1940), Indian artist
- Rukmini Vasanth (born 1996), Indian actress
- Rukmini Vijayakumar, Indian choreographer, dancer and film actress

== See also ==
- Rukmani (name)
- Rukmini – Hindu goddess and chief consort of god Krishna
