= Paul F. Reilly =

Retired American judge

The Honorable Paul F. Reilly

Judge of the Wisconsin Court of Appeals District II
- In office August 1, 2010 – January 3, 2022
- Preceded by: Harry G. Snyder
- Succeeded by: Lori Kornblum

Wisconsin Circuit Court Judge for the Waukesha Circuit, Branch 4
- In office August 1, 2003 – July 31, 2010
- Preceded by: Patrick L. Snyder
- Succeeded by: Kathleen Stilling

Personal details
- Born: Waukesha, Wisconsin
- Party: Republican
- Relations: Shawn Reilly (brother)
- Children: 2
- Education: Wisconsin School of Business; University of Wisconsin Law School (J.D.)
- Profession: lawyer, judge
- Website: Presiding Judge Paul F. Reilly

Paul F. Reilly is a retired American lawyer and judge. He served on the Wisconsin Court of Appeals in the Waukesha-based District II from 2010 until his retirement in 2022. Earlier, he served 7 years as a Wisconsin circuit court judge in Waukesha County.

== Biography ==
A native of Waukesha, Wisconsin, Reilly is a graduate of the Wisconsin School of Business and the University of Wisconsin Law School. Though his public position is officially a non-partisan one, Reilly is a Republican. He is married with two children.

== Career ==
After working in the private sector for more than fifteen years, Reilly served as City Attorney of New Berlin, Wisconsin, from 1997 to 2002. He was elected to the Wisconsin Circuit Court in 2003 and re-elected in 2009.

In 2010, Judge Reilly chose to run for a seat on the Wisconsin Court of Appeals to replace retiring Judge Harry G. Snyder. In the 2010 election, Judge Reilly faced fellow Waukesha County Circuit Judge Linda Van De Water. Though both candidates were Republicans, the election was framed as a contest between the more academic Reilly and the more activist Van De Water. Reilly prevailed in the election. He was selected as presiding judge of District II in 2015. He announced his plans to retire in 2021, and his retirement became effective on January 3, 2022.

Judge Reilly is a former president of the Waukesha County Bar Association and a former member of the State Bar Board of Governors.

Legal offices
Preceded by Patrick L. Snyder	Wisconsin Circuit Court Judge for the Waukesha Circuit, Branch 4 August 1, 2003 – July 31, 2010	Succeeded by Kathleen Stilling
Preceded by Harry G. Snyder	Judge of the Wisconsin Court of Appeals District II; August 1, 2010 – January 3, 2022	Succeeded by Lori Kornblum
