= Rukmani Gounder =

New Zealand economics academic

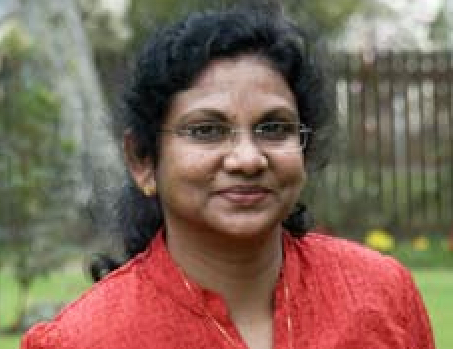
- Gounder in 2007
- Education: University of Queensland
- Scientific career
- Fields: Economics
- Workplaces: Massey University
- Thesis: An economic analysis of overseas aid motivations : theory and empirical results for Australia (1994)

Rukmani Gounder is a New Zealand economics academic. She is currently a full professor at the Massey University.

== Academic career ==
After a 1994 PhD titled 'An economic analysis of overseas aid motivations : theory and empirical results for Australia' at the University of Queensland, Gounder moved to the Massey University, rising to full professor.

== Selected works ==
- Bartleet, Matthew, and Rukmani Gounder. "Energy consumption and economic growth in New Zealand: Results of trivariate and multivariate models." Energy Policy 38, no. 7 (2010): 3508–3517.
- Gounder, R. (2001). Aid-growth nexus: empirical evidence from Fiji. Applied Economics, 33(8), 1009–1019.
- Gounder, Rukmani. "Empirical results of aid motivations: Australia's bilateral aid program." World Development 22, no. 1 (1994): 99–113.
- Saha, Shrabani, Rukmani Gounder, and Jen-Je Su. "The interaction effect of economic freedom and democracy on corruption: A panel cross-country analysis." Economics Letters 105, no. 2 (2009): 173–176.
- Gounder, Rukmani. "Political and economic freedom, fiscal policy, and growth nexus: some empirical results for Fiji." Contemporary Economic Policy 20, no. 3 (2002): 234–245.
