= Rukmini Foundation =

American non-profit organization

- Formation: 2011
- Headquarters: Pittsburgh, Pennsylvania, U.S.A.
- Region served: Nepal
- CEO: Bibhuti Aryal
- Main organ: Board of Directors

Rukmini Foundation is a Pittsburgh-based non-profit organization that raises funding for the education of underprivileged girls in Nepal.

== Program ==
The Rukmini Foundation uses donations to fund school tuition, supplies, routine health check-ups and mentoring/tutoring services for underprivileged teenage girls living in Nepal.
