= Rukmani Bai =

Indian politician

Member of Parliament, Rajya Sabha
- In office 1956-1962
- Constituency: Madhya Pradesh

Personal details
- Born: 1907
- Died: 1962 (aged 54–55)
- Party: Indian National Congress

Rukmani Bai (1907-1962) was an Indian politician. She was a Member of Parliament, representing Madhya Pradesh in the Rajya Sabha the upper house of India's Parliament as a member of the Indian National Congress.
