= Maria S. Lazar =

American judge (born 1964)

Maria Lazar

Judge of the Wisconsin Court of Appeals District II
- Incumbent
- Assumed office August 1, 2022
- Preceded by: Lori Kornblum

Judge of the Waukesha County Circuit Court Branch 7
- In office August 1, 2015 – July 31, 2022
- Preceded by: J. Mac Davis
- Succeeded by: Fred Strampe

Personal details
- Born: Maria Pellegrini; 1964 (age 61–62) Milwaukee, Wisconsin, U.S.
- Spouse: Thomas Lazar
- Education: Mount Mary University (BA); Georgetown University (JD)

Maria S. Lazar (née Pellegrini; born 1964) is an American lawyer and a judge of the Wisconsin Court of Appeals since 2022, serving in the Waukesha-based 2nd district. She previously served seven years as a Wisconsin circuit court judge in Waukesha County. She was an unsuccessful candidate for Wisconsin Supreme Court in the 2026 election.

Before serving in the judiciary, Lazar worked as an assistant attorney general in the Wisconsin Department of Justice during the administration of Governor Scott Walker. In that role, she handled litigation in support of Walker's signature anti-union law, 2011 Wisconsin Act 10, and then in defense of new security rules implemented to crack down on statewide protests against it. She later took on the job of defending the 2011 Republican redistricting law that implemented one of the most aggressive gerrymanders in the country.

== Early life and career ==
Maria S. Lazar was born Maria Pellegrini in Milwaukee, Wisconsin. She earned her bachelor's degree from Mount Mary College in 1986 and went on to earn her J.D. from Georgetown University Law Center in 1989.

For most of the next 20 years, she worked as an attorney in civil litigation in the Milwaukee law firm Galanis, Pollack, Jacobs and Johnson.

== Assistant attorney general ==
Following the 2010 Wisconsin gubernatorial election, Lazar was hired as an assistant attorney general in the Wisconsin Department of Justice. She quickly entered public notoriety in the controversy around Governor Scott Walker's signature anti-union and anti-labor law—2011 Wisconsin Act 10. Lazar represented the Wisconsin Department of Administration in litigation over new security rules for the Wisconsin State Capitol, which had been implemented to crack down on the massive protests against Act 10. Following the passage of Act 10, she was lead trial attorney for the state government, defending the law from litigation, and ultimately won at the Wisconsin Supreme Court in June 2011.

In the fall, she took on the job of defending the Republican redistricting law—2011 Wisconsin Act 43—which implemented one of the most aggressive legislative gerrymanders in the country. Her most notable case arising from this law was Baldus v. Wisconsin Government Accountability Board. After winning a near-total victory for her client in the United States District Court for the Eastern District of Wisconsin, the decision was appealed, and was eventually combined with several other related redistricting lawsuits before the United States Supreme Court which stretched past her time as assistant attorney general.

She also participated in defense of the state's new voter ID laws and abortion regulations.

== Judicial career ==
In April 2015, Lazar was elected without opposition to fill an open Wisconsin circuit court seat in Waukesha County.

After just three years on the court, Lazar considered a run for Wisconsin Supreme Court in 2018, but ultimately decided not to run in that election. She instead remained for the full six-year term, then won re-election unopposed in 2021. During her seven years on the circuit court, she served rotations in the juvenile, criminal, and civil divisions, and did a stint working as a drug treatment court judge. She also continued to raise her profile in conservative legal circles, and was a contributor to the Federalist Society.

In the fall of 2021, Judge Paul F. Reilly announced he would retire from the Wisconsin Court of Appeals at the end of the year. In November, Lazar announced her intention to run for the seat in the April 2022 election. In the meantime, Governor Tony Evers appointed former Milwaukee assistant district attorney Lori Kornblum to fill the vacancy, and Kornblum also announced her intention to run for a full term on the court in the April 2022 election.

The election was contentious, with negative ads attempting to tar Kornblum by linking her to Milwaukee County district attorney John T. Chisholm. Chisholm was taking substantial criticism at the time because the perpetrator of the Waukesha Christmas parade attack had been arrested in Milwaukee on a domestic violence charge and made bail just before the incident. One Lazar ad used actual footage of the parade attack. Kornblum ran ads against Lazar accusing her of giving a light sentence to a police officer who had been convicted of sexual assault.

In the Spring general election, Lazar defeated Kornblum with 55% of the vote. She began her term on the Wisconsin Court of Appeals in August 2022.

== Electoral history ==
=== Wisconsin Court of Appeals (2022) ===
Wisconsin Court of Appeals, District II Election, 2022
| Party | Candidate | Votes | % | ±% |
|---|---|---|---|---|
General Election, April 5, 2022
| Nonpartisan | Maria S. Lazar | 158,297 | 54.46% | |
| Nonpartisan | Lori Kornblum (incumbent) | 131,873 | 45.37% | |
| | Scattering | 484 | 0.17% | |
| Plurality | | 26,424 | 9.09% | −2.63% |
| Total votes | | 290,654 | 100.0% | +8.79% |

=== Wisconsin Supreme Court (2026) ===
Wisconsin Supreme Court Election, 2026
| Party | Candidate | Votes | % | ±% |
|---|---|---|---|---|
General Election, April 7, 2026
| Nonpartisan | Chris Taylor | 905,490 | 60.09% | |
| Nonpartisan | Maria S. Lazar | 600,256 | 39.84% | |
| | Scattering | 1,096 | 0.07% | |
| Plurality | | 305,234 | 20.25% | +10.16pp |
| Total votes | | 1,506,842 | 100.0% | -36.30% |
