= 2026 Wisconsin Supreme Court election =

- April 7, 2026
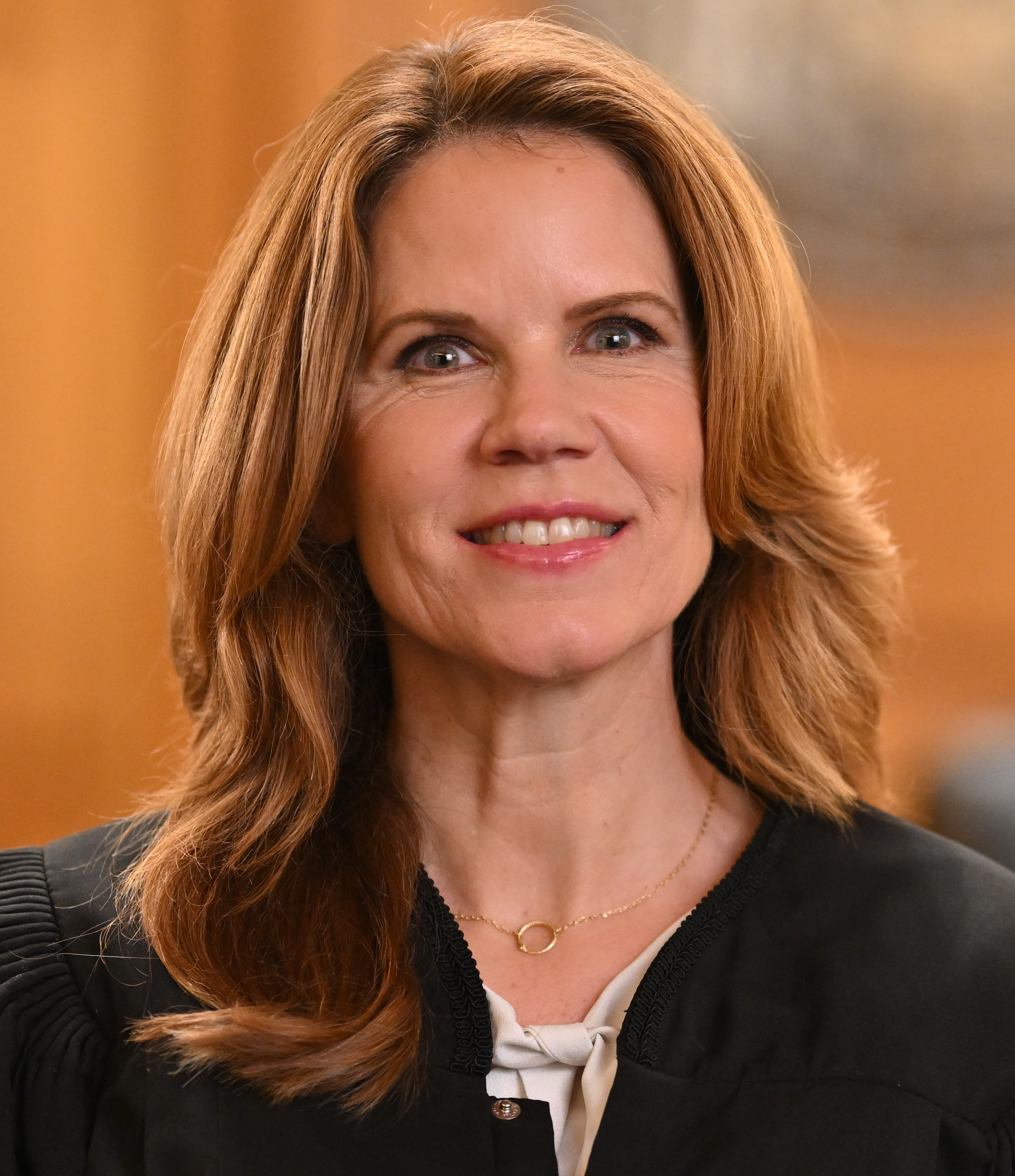

Candidate	Chris Taylor	Maria Lazar
Popular vote	905,490	600,256
Percentage	60.09%	39.84%
- Taylor: 40–50% 50–60% 60–70% 70–80% 80–90% >90% Lazar: 40–50% 50–60% 60–70% 70–80% 80–90% >90% Tie: 40–50% 50% No data/No votes
Justice before election
Rebecca Bradley
Elected Justice
Chris Taylor

The 2026 Wisconsin Supreme Court election was held on April 7, 2026, to elect a justice of the Wisconsin Supreme Court for a ten-year term. Wisconsin Court of Appeals judge Chris Taylor defeated fellow Court of Appeals judge Maria Lazar in a landslide, expanding the court's liberal majority from 4–3 to 5–2. Taylor was sworn in at the start of the next judicial term, on August 1, 2026.

Incumbent justice Rebecca Bradley chose not to seek reelection after serving on the court since October 2015. Bradley was associated with the conservative minority on the court, meaning that the 2026 election could not change the ideological majority of the court. Since control of the court was not at risk, this race had a much lower profile than recent Wisconsin Supreme Court elections. The 2023 and 2025 elections were the most expensive judicial races in world history, with total spending in those races exceeding $45 million and $100 million, respectively; the 2026 election, on the other hand, saw less than $9 million spent by the campaigns and outside interests. Voter turnout was also down significantly from the high bar set in 2023 and 2025.

Taylor won the election by about 20 percentage points, far exceeding pre-election polling and the spread seen in recent Supreme Court elections. This election marked the largest margin of victory in a contested Wisconsin Supreme Court race since 2000. Because of the schedule of upcoming judicial elections, Taylor's victory likely secures a liberal majority on the Wisconsin Supreme Court until at least August 2030.

== Background ==
The Wisconsin Supreme Court tipped from a 4–3 conservative majority to a 4–3 liberal majority due to the 2023 election, which at that time was the most expensive judicial election in history. The liberals retained their 4–3 majority in the 2025 election, when that race became the most expensive judicial election in history. The incumbent in 2026, Rebecca Bradley, is a member of the conservative minority, and therefore the outcome of the election would not change the court's ideological majority in any case.

Bradley initially announced in April 2025 that she would run for reelection. Political observers, however, noticed that she was not engaged in any fund-raising activity for a reelection campaign, and on August 29, 2025, she announced she was withdrawing from the race.

Historically, it has been rare for incumbents to lose reelection to the Wisconsin Supreme Court. Due to this, open-seat races have generally been regarded as valuable opportunities to potentially alter the court's ideological composition. Only 23 of the more than 136 previous elections held for the court have been for open seats. (Note: (excludes elections to fill newly-created seats for which there was no incumbent)) It has also been rare for contested Wisconsin Supreme Court races to be held without the need for a primary.

== Candidates ==
=== Declared ===
- Maria Lazar, (Note: Described by media outlets as conservative) Wisconsin Court of Appeals judge (2022–present)
- Chris Taylor, (Note: Described by media outlets as liberal) Wisconsin Court of Appeals judge (2023–present) and former state representative (2011–2019)

=== Declined ===
- Rebecca Bradley, (Note: Described by media outlets as conservative) incumbent Supreme Court justice (2015–present)
- Lyndsey Boon Brunette, Clark County circuit judge and former Clark County district attorney (2012–2016) (endorsed Taylor)
- Pedro Colón, (Note: Described by media outlets as liberal) Wisconsin Court of Appeals judge (2023–present) and former state representative (1999–2011) (endorsed Taylor)
- Sara Geenen, (Note: Described by media outlets as liberal) Wisconsin Court of Appeals judge (2023–present) (endorsed Taylor)
- Gregory Gill, (Note: Described by media outlets as conservative) Wisconsin Court of Appeals judge (2021–present)
- Rachel Graham, Wisconsin Court of Appeals judge (2019–present) (endorsed Taylor)

== Campaign ==
Without the court's ideological majority hanging in the balance, the election attracted far less attention and fundraising than the 2025 election, which was the most expensive judicial election in American history. As the race neared its end in March, spending was less than $9 million total, far below the $100 million in the prior election. The decline in fundraising and advertising greatly lowered the profile of the race, with only a small proportion of the electorate paying close attention. In line with previous elections, however, voting rights remained at the forefront of the campaign with Taylor and Lazar taking opposite positions on recent redistricting litigation, as well as other issues such as abortion and labor rights. Taylor held a considerable fundraising lead in the leadup to the election, as liberals sought to expand their majority on the Court.

This fundraising advantage, as well as her lead in pre-election polling, had most, including many Republicans, predicting Taylor as favored to win the election. Some characterized the Republicans as both organizationally and motivationally demoralized after having lost the previous three Supreme Court elections by wide margins. The low turnout in early voting, muted voter enthusiasm, and large number of undecided voters in polling still left the outcome uncertain, however, with the same predictors conceding a Lazar upset as a possibility.

== Endorsements ==
Maria Lazar

U.S. representatives

- Scott Fitzgerald, WI-5 (2021–present) (Republican)
- Glenn Grothman, WI-6 (2015–present) (Republican)
- Bryan Steil, WI-1 (2019–present) (Republican)
- Tom Tiffany, WI-7 (2020–present) (Republican)
- Derrick Van Orden, WI-3 (2023–present) (Republican)
- Tony Wied, WI-8 (2024–present) (Republican)

Statewide officials

- Scott Walker, former governor of Wisconsin (2011–2019) (Republican)

Judicial officials

- Annette Ziegler, Wisconsin Supreme Court justice (2007–present) and former chief justice (2021–2025)

Individuals

- Jim Troupis, lawyer (Republican)

Labor unions

- Wisconsin Fraternal Order of Police

Organizations

- National Federation of Independent Business Wisconsin

Political parties

- Wisconsin Republican Party
Chris Taylor

Executive branch officials

- Eric Holder, former U.S. attorney general (2009–2015) (Democratic)
- Barack Obama, former president of the United States (2009–2017) (Democratic)

U.S. senators

- Tammy Baldwin, U.S. senator from Wisconsin (2013–present) (Democratic)
- Chris Murphy, U.S. senator from Connecticut (2013–present) (Democratic)

Judicial officials

- Ann Walsh Bradley, former Wisconsin Supreme Court justice (1995–2025) and former chief justice (2025)
- Pedro Colón, Wisconsin Court of Appeals judge (2023–present) and former state representative (1999–2011)
- Susan Crawford, Wisconsin Supreme Court justice (2025–present)
- Rebecca Dallet, Wisconsin Supreme Court justice (2018–present)
- Sara Geenen, Wisconsin Court of appeals judge (2023–present)
- Rachel A. Graham, Wisconsin Court of appeals judge (2019–present)
- Jill Karofsky, Wisconsin Supreme Court justice (2020–present) and chief justice (2025–present)
- Janet Protasiewicz, Wisconsin Supreme Court justice (2023–present)

Local officials

- David Crowley, Milwaukee County executive (2020–present); former state representative (2017–2020)

Party officials

- Devin Remiker, chair of the Wisconsin Democratic Party (2025–present)

Individuals

- Mini Timmaraju, president of Reproductive Freedom for All (2021–present)

Labor unions

- AFSCME Council 32
- American Federation of Teachers Wisconsin and Local 212 MATC
- Madison Teachers Inc.
- Service Employees International Union Wisconsin
- United Auto Workers Region 4
- United Steelworkers
- Wisconsin Education Association Council
- Wisconsin Laborers’ District Council
- Wisconsin State AFL-CIO

Organizations

- 350 Wisconsin Action
- Citizen Action of Wisconsin
- Democratic Legislative Campaign Committee
- EMILY's List
- End Citizens United
- Fair Wisconsin
- Freedom From Religion Foundation Action Fund
- Jewish Democratic Council of America
- National Association of Social Workers Wisconsin
- National Democratic Redistricting Committee
- Planned Parenthood Advocates of Wisconsin
- Reproductive Freedom for All
- Third Act Wisconsin
- Wisconsin Conservation Voters
- Young Democrats of Wisconsin

Newspapers

- The Capital Times
- The Shepherd Express

Political parties

- Wisconsin Democratic Party
- Working Families Party
Declined to endorse

Newspapers

- Wisconsin State Journal

== Debate ==
2026 Wisconsin Supreme Court election debate
No.	Date	Host	Moderators	Link	Candidates	
P Participant A Absent N Non-invitee I Invitee W Withdrawn						
P Participant A Absent N Non-invitee I Invitee W Withdrawn					Lazar	Taylor
1	April 2, 2026	WISN-TV	Matt Smith, Gerron Jordan		P	P

== Fundraising ==
Campaign finance reports as of March 23, 2026
Candidate	Raised	Spent	Cash on hand
Maria Lazar	$862,176	$645,497	$217,859
Chris Taylor	$6,126,855	$5,290,379	$332,389
Source: WI Ethics Commission

== Polling ==
Pollster	Dates administered	Sample size (Note: Key: A – all adults RV – registered voters LV – likely voters V – unclear)	Margin of error	Chris Taylor	Maria Lazar	Other	Undecided
Marquette University Law School	March 11–18, 2026	597 (LV)	± 5.3%	30%	22%	1% (Note: "Will not vote in that election" with 1%)	47%
Marquette University Law School	March 11–18, 2026	850 (RV)	± 4.4%	23%	17%	7% (Note: "Will not vote in that election" with 7%; "Refused" with 0%)	53%
Marquette University Law School	February 11–19, 2026	818 (RV)	± 4.3%	17%	12%	5% (Note: "Will not vote in that election" with 5%; "Refused" with 0%)	66%

== Results ==
Taylor won the election by a wide margin, securing liberal control of the court until at least 2030. Despite most predicting that she would win, her margin of victory was substantially larger than anticipated, standing at 20 percentage points, which was double the margin of the preceding three liberal Supreme Court victories. Taylor became the first democratic-aligned candidate since 2015 to win a majority of the state's counties, although analysis of each county's individual margins compared to her statewide margin produces similar voting patterns to that of the 2024 presidential election, suggesting a persistence of political polarization among the electorate. Taylor's performance in the WOW counties, once the state's foremost Republican strongholds, were particularly notable, winning Ozaukee County outright and holding Lazar to much narrower margins than usual in Waukesha and Washington counties.

Turnout in the race was approximately one third of registered voters, above average for state supreme court elections, though still a drop of about 860,000 votes from the 2025 election.

2026 Wisconsin Supreme Court election
Candidate	Votes	%
Chris Taylor	905,490	60.09
Maria Lazar	600,256	39.84
Write-in	1,096	0.07
Total votes	1,506,842	100.00

=== By congressional district ===
Taylor won seven of eight congressional districts, including five held by Republicans.

District	Lazar	Taylor	Representative
1st	42.4%	57.6%	Bryan Steil
2nd	20.4%	79.6%	Mark Pocan
3rd	39.3%	60.7%	Derrick Van Orden
4th	18.9%	81.1%	Gwen Moore
5th	54.3%	45.7%	Scott L. Fitzgerald
6th	47.9%	52.1%	Glenn Grothman
7th	48.7%	51.3%	Tom Tiffany
8th	46.5%	53.5%	Tony Wied

== See also ==
- 2026 Wisconsin elections
- 2026 United States judicial elections
