= Susan M. Crawford =

American lawyer and jurist (born 1965)

Susan Crawford
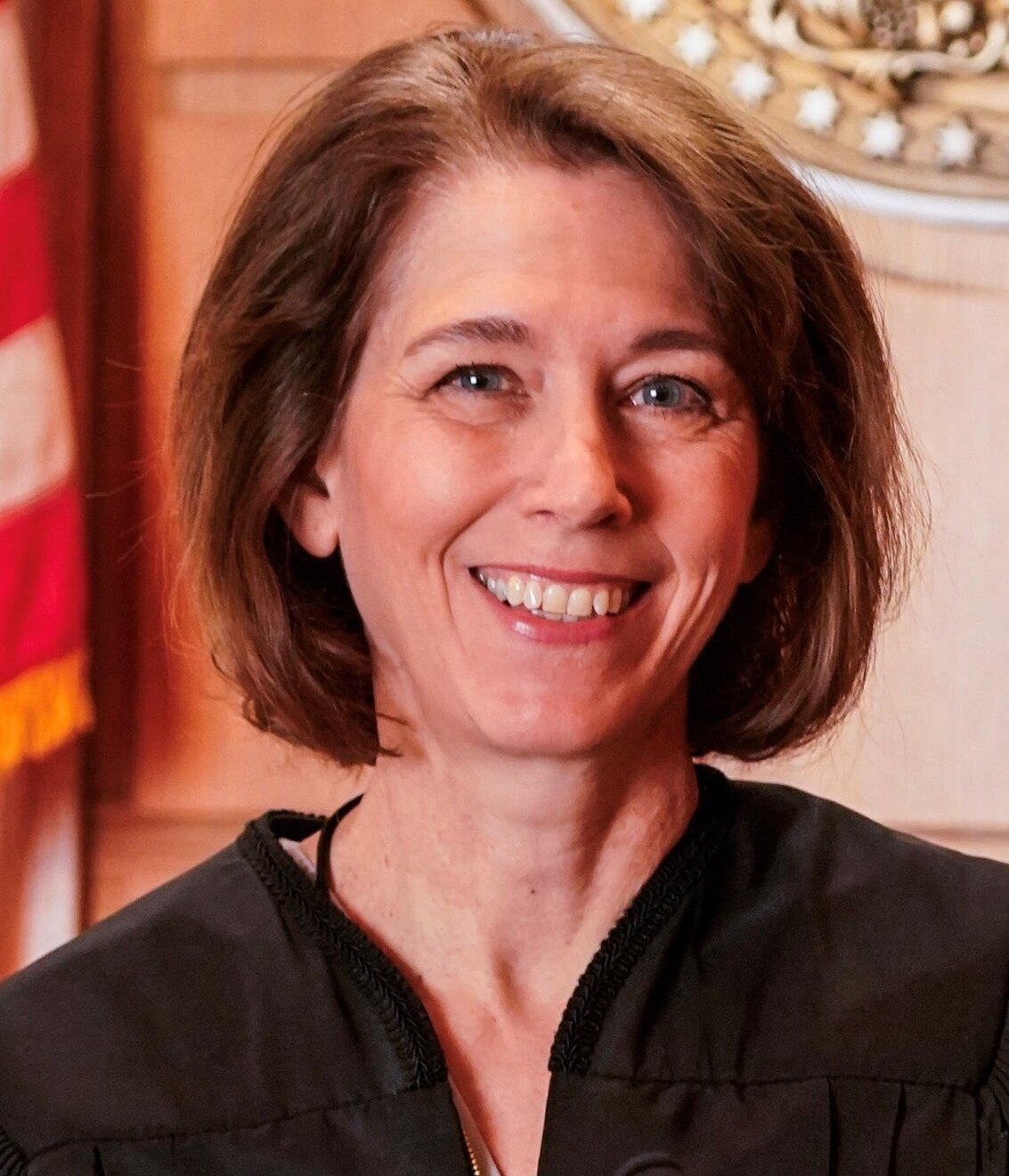
- Crawford in 2025

Justice of the Wisconsin Supreme Court
- Incumbent
- Assumed office August 1, 2025
- Preceded by: Ann Walsh Bradley

Judge of the Dane County Circuit Court Branch 1
- In office August 1, 2018 – July 31, 2025
- Preceded by: Timothy Samuelson
- Succeeded by: Ben Jones

Personal details
- Born: March 1, 1965 (age 61) Lewiston, New York, U.S.
- Spouse: Shawn Peters (m. 2000)
- Children: 2
- Education: Lawrence University (BA); Indiana University, Bloomington (MA); University of Iowa (JD)
- Website: Campaign website

Susan Margaret Crawford (born March 1, 1965) is an American attorney and jurist from Madison, Wisconsin. She has served on the Wisconsin Supreme Court since 2025. She was previously a Wisconsin circuit court judge in Dane County from 2018 to 2026.

Earlier in her career, Crawford was chief legal counsel to Wisconsin governor Jim Doyle, and served as administrator of the Office of Enforcement and Science in the Wisconsin Department of Natural Resources. Before that, she was an assistant attorney general in the Iowa Department of Justice and then the Wisconsin Department of Justice; in both roles, she specialized in criminal appeals.

During the 2025 election campaign, she was identified as a liberal candidate, and received support from Democratic Party donors. In her career as an attorney, she took on cases in support of labor unions, women's rights, voting rights, and public education.

== Early life and education ==
Crawford was raised in Chippewa Falls, Wisconsin. One of four children, her parents were originally from Monroe, Wisconsin.

She graduated from Chippewa Falls High School in 1983. She went on to attend Lawrence University in Appleton, Wisconsin, where she earned her bachelor's degree in 1987. She immediately continued her education at Indiana University, earning her master's degree in 1989. A short time later, she entered the University of Iowa College of Law and obtained her J.D. in 1994. During her third year of law school, she was editor-in-chief of Transnational Law & Contemporary Problems, a law journal for students at Iowa.

== Early career ==
She was admitted to the bar in Iowa in early 1995, and took a job as an assistant attorney general in the Iowa Department of Justice. She worked in their criminal appeals division, based in Des Moines, and often litigated before the Iowa Supreme Court. Crawford was admitted to the Wisconsin Bar in 1997, after which she became an assistant attorney general for the Wisconsin Department of Justice where she worked as a prosecutor on hundreds of cases, and also held the title of director of the appellate unit (criminal appeals) under then-attorney general, Jim Doyle.

After nearly a decade of service at the Wisconsin Department of Justice, she departed in 2007 and went on to work for a number of other state agencies during then-Governor Jim Doyle's second term, including the Department of Corrections and Department of Natural Resources. At the DNR she held the title of Administrator of the Division of Enforcement and Science and oversaw the implementation of state stimulus funds from the American Recovery and Reinvestment Act of 2009 that saved many from unemployment during the recession of 2008.

She was selected by Governor Doyle to serve as his chief legal counsel in the governor's office in 2009. As chief legal counsel she also served as chair of the governor's Pardon Advisory Board.

After Doyle left office, Crawford resumed her legal career with the Madison firm Cullen Weston Pines & Bach, which later became Pines Bach LLP. The firm has a history of representing clients aligned with Democratic and left-leaning causes, often challenging Republican-backed legislation in Wisconsin. Two years later, Crawford was named a partner in the law firm, with a practice focused on voting and workers' rights, notably representing Planned Parenthood of Wisconsin, the League of Women Voters, the state Superintendent Tony Evers, and the Madison teachers' union.

== Earlier judicial career ==
In 2018, Crawford made her first bid for elected office, running for an open Wisconsin circuit court judgeship in Dane County. In the election, she faced Marilyn Townsend, a municipal judge for the village of Shorewood Hills who had run unsuccessfully for another circuit judgeship the prior year. Crawford was quickly endorsed by several of the other Dane County judges. In campaigning for the office, Crawford focused on her extensive experience with litigation and her past work in defense of unions, public education, and women's rights. Crawford ultimately won the election by just 3,814 votes out of 114,875 cast. She was unopposed for re-election in 2024.

== Wisconsin Supreme Court ==
=== Election ===
In 2024, Wisconsin Supreme Court justice Ann Walsh Bradley announced she would not run for re-election in 2025. Wide speculation followed her announcement about which other state judges would jump into the race. Crawford announced her candidacy in June 2024 and was quickly endorsed by all four liberal justices on the Wisconsin Supreme Court, including the retiring Bradley. Only one other candidate filed to run, eliminating the need for a primary. She faced former Republican state attorney general Brad Schimel in the general election on April 1, 2025.

The election was the most expensive judicial race in United States history up to that time. Fundraising was a major topic in the campaign. In January 2025, Crawford's opponents accused her of being partisan for attending a briefing linked to Democratic donors. Crawford received over one million dollars in campaign donations from billionaire George Soros. Her opponent, on the other hand, received more than $25 million in campaign support from billionaire Republican donor and Trump administration official Elon Musk. Two weeks before the election, campaign spending had already topped $76 million, exceeding $100 million by election day.

Crawford's sentencing record was a major target for opposition PACs, specifically over a 2019 sexual assault where she sentenced the defendant to less than the prosecution's request. She sentenced the defendant to four years in prison with six years post-release supervision; the prosecution had requested ten years in prison.

Crawford prevailed in the April 1 election, receiving roughly 55% of the vote. She took office on August 1, 2025.

== Personal life ==
Crawford married Shawn F. Peters at Wingra Park in Madison on May 27, 2000. They reside in Madison and have two adult children. Over the past 20 years, Crawford has made small personal donations to the campaigns of other judicial candidates and Democratic politicians.

== Electoral history ==
=== Dane County circuit court (2018, 2024) ===
Year	Election	Date	Elected				Defeated				Total	Plurality
2018	General	Apr. 3	Susan M. Crawford	Nonpartisan	59,048	51.40%	Marilyn Townsend	Non.	55,234	48.08%	114,875	3,814
2024	General	Apr. 2	Susan M. Crawford (inc)	Nonpartisan	89,390	99.06%	--unopposed--				90,240	88,540

=== Wisconsin Supreme Court (2025) ===
Year	Election	Date	Elected				Defeated				Total	Plurality
2025	General	Apr. 1	Susan Crawford	Nonpartisan	1,301,137	55.02%	Brad Schimel	Non.	1,062,330	44.92%	2,364,887	238,807

Legal offices
Preceded by Ann Walsh Bradley	Justice of the Wisconsin Supreme Court; 2025–present	Incumbent
