= Mini Timmaraju =

American lawyer and reproductive rights activist

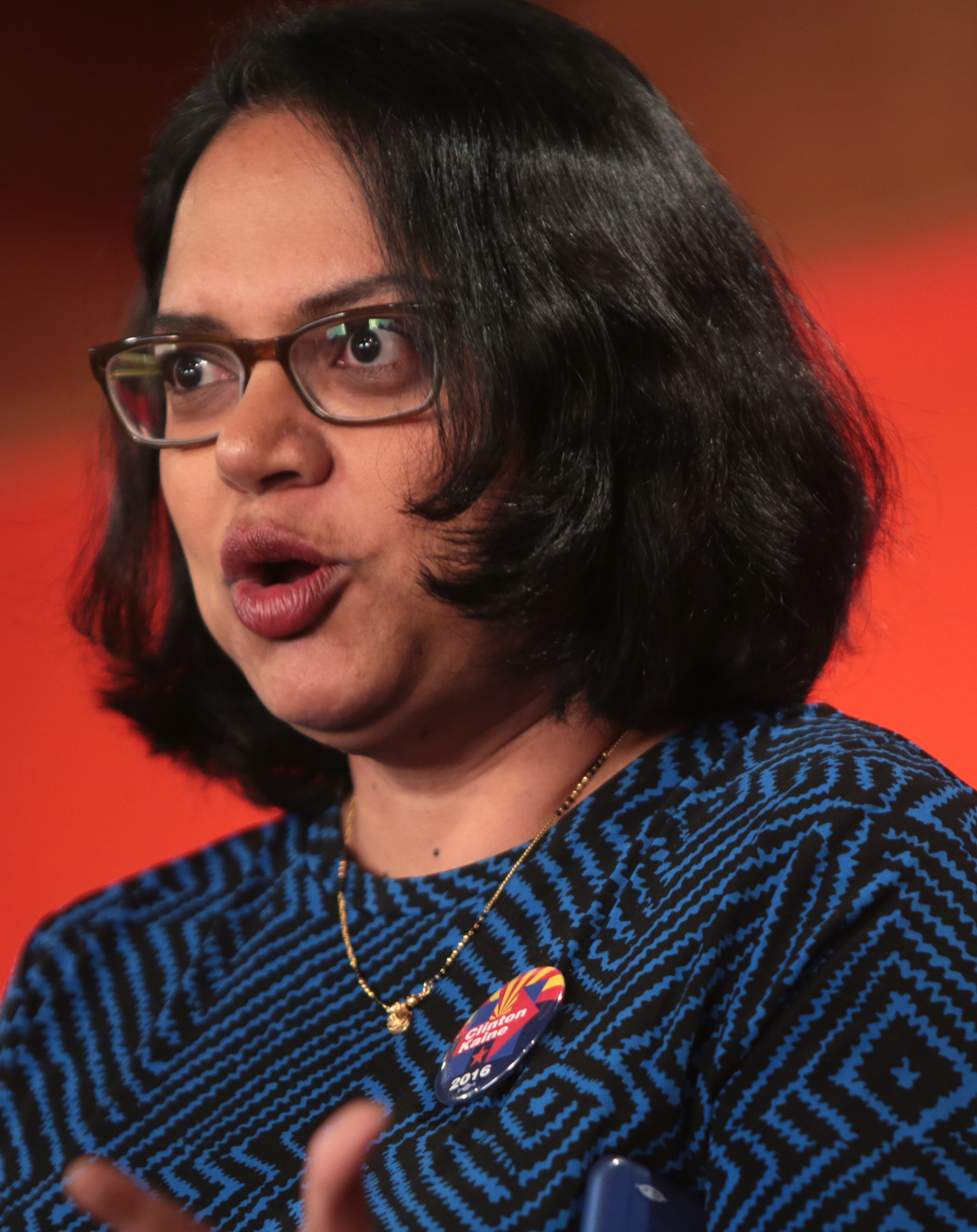
- Timmaraju in 2016
- Born: Rukmini Timmaraju; February 25, 1973 (age 53); Hyderabad, India
- Education: University of California, Berkeley (BA); University of Houston (JD)

Rukmini "Mini" Timmaraju is an American lawyer and reproductive rights advocate. She has been president of Reproductive Freedom for All, formerly known as NARAL Pro-Choice America, since 2021. She previously worked for Planned Parenthood, Comcast, the Hillary Clinton 2016 presidential campaign and the U.S. Office of Personnel Management. She earned a J.D. from the University of Houston Law Center.

== Early life and education ==
Rukmini Timmaraju was born on February 25, 1973, to a Telugu Indian American family. While her parents were from the Philadelphia area, her mother traveled to Hyderabad to be close to her family before her daughter was born. The nickname Mini is from a character in a short story titled Kabuliwala, by Rabindranath Tagore. Mini's family moved to Sugar Land, Texas, where Mini attended William P. Clements High School and graduated in 1991. She went on to earn a bachelor's degree in development studies and international area studies in 1995 from the University of California, Berkeley. She earned a J.D. in 1999 from the University of Houston Law Center.

== Career ==
Timmaraju held various positions with Planned Parenthood from 2008 to 2013. She was then chief of staff for U.S. Representative Ami Bera (D-CA). She served as director of the National Council of Asian Pacific Americans in 2014 and 2015. She worked on the Hillary Clinton 2016 presidential campaign as National Women's Vote Director. From 2017 until 2021, she worked for Comcast Corporation/NBCUniversal as director of external affairs and diversity, equity, and inclusion. During the Biden administration, she worked for the U.S. Office of Personnel Management in 2021 as senior adviser to the director.

In November 2021, Timmaraju was named president of Reproductive Freedom for All. She was the first woman of color to be named president of the organization.
