= State Bar of Wisconsin =

Bar Association

- Type: Legal society
- Headquarters: Madison, Wisconsin
- Location: United States
- Members: 23,525 (in 2012)
- Website: www.wisbar.org

The State Bar of Wisconsin (SBW) is the integrated (mandatory) bar association of the U.S. state of Wisconsin. Created by the Wisconsin Supreme Court for all attorneys who hold a Wisconsin law license, the State Bar of Wisconsin aids the courts in improving the administration of justice, provides continuing legal education and other services for its members, and supports the education of law students. The SBW also provides public services, including attorney referrals, public education, and reduced-fee legal assistance for low-income state residents.

== History ==
The State Bar of Wisconsin was organized on January 9, 1878, as a voluntary association; its first president was Moses M. Strong.

In 1956, the Wisconsin Supreme Court ordered the Bar to become an integrated bar; membership would be a requirement to practice law in Wisconsin courts. In 1988, a federal court ruled this requirement unconstitutional, leading the Wisconsin Supreme Court to suspend enforcement of the mandatory membership rule. When the district court ruling was overturned, and following a public hearing, the Supreme Court ordered the mandatory membership requirement reinstated, effective July 1, 1992.

== Structure ==
A 53-member Board of Governors manages and directs the SBW affairs. Governors include the association's five officers, immediate past president, thirty-five members elected from the 16 State Bar districts, one member selected by each of the Government Lawyers Division, Young Lawyers Division, and Senior Lawyers Division, five selected by the Nonresident Lawyers Division, four Building Bridges Liaisons, and three nonlawyer members appointed by the Wisconsin Supreme court.

The Office of Lawyer Regulation (OLR) is an agency of the Wisconsin Supreme Court. The ORL enforces the rule that Wisconsin lawyers must complete 30 credits of Continuing Legal Education every two years.

SBW publishes the monthly Wisconsin Lawyer, plus WisBar InsideTrack and the Rotunda Report.
