= 2026 Wisconsin elections =

- April 7, 2026; November 3, 2026

The 2026 Wisconsin fall general election was held in the U.S. state of Wisconsin on November 3, 2026. All of Wisconsin's partisan executive and administrative offices were up for election, as well as all of Wisconsin's eight seats in the U.S. House of Representatives. The fall election also filled the seventeen odd-numbered seats in the Wisconsin Senate and all 99 seats in the Wisconsin State Assembly for the 108th Wisconsin Legislature, and presented three state constitutional amendments to voters for ratification. The 2026 Wisconsin fall primary took place on August 11, 2026.

The Democratic Party swept all of the fall elections for statewide officials. David Crowley became the first African American to win a Wisconsin gubernatorial election and—once sworn in—will be the youngest governor in the United States at age 40; JoCasta Zamarripa became the first Latina to win a statewide election in Wisconsin and Yee Leng Xiong became the first Hmong person to win a statewide election anywhere in the United States. Democrats also won control of both chambers of the Wisconsin Legislature and defeated two incumbent Republican U.S. representatives. The one potential bright spot for Republicans was that two of their three proposed amendments to the constitution were ratified by voters—limiting the governor's line-item veto power and adding new language designed to prohibit affirmative action.

The incumbent governor, state Senate majority leader, and state assembly speaker all declined to run for re-election in 2026, making this the first time since 2010 when all three of the top executive and legislative offices in Wisconsin would change hands at the same time. After this election, Ron Johnson remains the only Republican elected statewide in Wisconsin, leading to speculataion he may run for a fourth term in 2028.

The 2026 Wisconsin spring election was held on April 7, 2026. Among the nonpartisan local and judicial races, the premier race on the spring ballot was a seat on the Wisconsin Supreme Court; Democrats' preferred candidate, Chris Taylor, defeated the Republicans' preferred candidate, Maria S. Lazar, expanding the liberal majority on the court from 4–3 to 5–2. The Democrats' preferred candidate also won a narrow victory in the closely-watched mayoral election in Waukesha, Wisconsin. The 2026 spring primary took place on February 17, 2026.

== Federal offices ==
=== U.S. House ===
District		Incumbent			This race	
Location	2022 PVI	Member	Party	First elected	Result	Candidates
Wisconsin 1	R+3	Bryan Steil	Republican	2018	Incumbent lost re-election. Democratic gain.	▌ ✓ Mitchell Berman (Dem.); ▌Bryan Steil (Rep.)
Wisconsin 2	D+19	Mark Pocan	Democratic	2012	Incumbent re-elected.	▌ ✓ Mark Pocan (Dem.)
Wisconsin 3	R+4	Derrick Van Orden	Republican	2022	Incumbent lost re-election. Democratic gain.	▌ ✓ Rebecca Cooke (Dem.); ▌Derrick Van Orden (Rep.)
Wisconsin 4	D+25	Gwen Moore	Democratic	2004	Incumbent re-elected.	▌ ✓ Gwen Moore (Dem.); ▌Tim Rogers (Rep.)
Wisconsin 5	R+14	Scott Fitzgerald	Republican	2020	Incumbent re-elected.	▌ ✓ Scott Fitzgerald (Rep.); ▌Andrew Beck (Dem.)
Wisconsin 6	R+10	Glenn Grothman	Republican	2014	Incumbent re-elected.	▌ ✓ Glenn Grothman (Rep.); ▌Brad Smith (Dem.)
Wisconsin 7	R+12	Tom Tiffany	Republican	2020 (special)	Incumbent retired to run for governor. New member elected. Republican hold.	▌ ✓ Michael Alfonso (Rep.); ▌Fred Clark (Dem.)
Wisconsin 8	R+10	Tony Wied	Republican	2024	Incumbent re-elected.	▌ ✓ Tony Wied (Rep.); ▌Rick Crosson (Dem.)

== State offices ==
=== Executive ===
All of Wisconsin's partisan executive offices were up for election on November 3, 2026, with partisan primaries held on August 11.

==== Governor ====
Incumbent Democratic governor Tony Evers, first elected in 2018, did not run for a third term. The Democratic nominee, Milwaukee County executive David Crowley, was elected governor of Wisconsin, defeating Republican U.S. representative Tom Tiffany. Crowley became the first African American to win a Wisconsin gubernatorial election; his margin of victory was the largest since 1998, this election also marks the first time since 1962 in which a Democratic governor of Wisconsin was succeeded by another Democrat.

In the Democratic primary, Crowley defeated state representative Francesca Hong, state senator Kelda Roys, and former state secretary of administration Joel Brennan. Incumbent lieutenant governor Sara Rodriguez, former lieutenant governor Mandela Barnes, former CEO of the Wisconsin Economic Development Corporation Missy Hughes, former state representative Brett Hulsey, Oshkosh Defense assembler Tim Jacobson, and stadium vendor Ryan Strnad all withdrew before the primary.

In the Republican primary, Tiffany defeated medical services technician Andy Manske. Washington County executive Josh Schoemann and manufacturing executive Bill Berrien withdrew before the primary.

==== Lieutenant governor ====
Incumbent Democratic lieutenant governor Sara Rodriguez, first elected in 2022, did not run for re-election—she instead sought the Democratic nomination for governor. Wisconsin secretary of state Sarah Godlewski won the Democratic nomination and was elected lieutenant governor in the general election on a ticket with David Crowley. Former mayor David Varnum, of Lancaster, Wisconsin, won the Republican primary for lieutenant governor.

Godlewski faced no opposition in the Democratic Primary. In the Republican primary, Varnum defeated Will Martin, a small business owner from Racine; this was a mild upset, as the Republican State Convention had officially endorsed Martin for lieutenant governor.

==== Attorney general ====
Incumbent Democratic attorney general Josh Kaul, first elected in 2018, was re-elected to a third four-year term. He defeated the Republican nominee, Fond du Lac County district attorney Eric Toney, in a re-match of the 2022 election for attorney general.

Neither Kaul nor Toney faced opposition in their respective primaries.

==== Secretary of state ====
Incumbent Democratic secretary of state Sarah Godlewski, did not run for re-election—she instead sought the Democratic nomination for lieutenant governor. The Democratic nominee, JoCasta Zamarripa, a Milwaukee alder and former state representative, was elected secretary of state, defeating Republican nominee Jay Schroeder, a businessman from Clintonville. Zamarripa became the first Latina to win an election for statewide office in Wisconsin. This was the first open seat secretary of state election in Wisconsin since 1978.

Zamarripa faced no opposition in the Democratic primary. In the Republican primary, Schroeder defeated farmer Nate Pollnow, realtor Cindy Werner, and legislative staffer Brayden Myer; this primary election was also considered an upset, since the Republican State Convention had unanimously endorsed Pollnow for this office.

==== Treasurer ====
Incumbent Republican state treasurer John Leiber, first elected in 2022, ran for re-election. He was defeated by Democratic candidate Yee Leng Xiong, a Marathon County supervisor, in the general election. Xiong became the first person of Hmong descent to win an election for statewide office anywhere in the United States.

Leiber faced no opposition in the Republican primary. In the Democratic primary, Xiong defeated Dylan Helmenstine, a school board member from Black Earth.

=== Legislature ===
==== State senate ====
Republican hold Democratic hold Democratic gain No election

		Party (majority caucus shading)		Total
		Democratic	Republican	Total
Last election (2024)		6	10	16
Total after last election (2024)		15	18	33
Total before this election		15	18	33
Up for election		5	12	17
of which:	Incumbent retiring	0	6	6
of which:	Vacated	0	0	0
of which:	Open	0	7	7
of which:	Unopposed	2	0	2
This election		8	9	17
Change from last election		▲3	▼3	
Total after this election		18	15	33
Change in total		▲3	▼3	

==== State assembly ====
Republican hold Democratic hold Democratic gain

		Party (majority caucus shading)		Total
		Democratic	Republican	Total
Last election (2024)		35	64	99
Total after last election (2024)		45	54	99
Total before this election		45	54	99
Up for election		45	54	99
of which:	Incumbent retiring	3	9	12
of which:	Vacated	0	0	0
of which:	Open	3	9	12
of which:	Unopposed	2	6	8
This election		53	46	99
Change from last election		▲8	▼8	
Total after this election		53	46	99
Change in total		▲8	▼8	

=== Judiciary ===
==== State Supreme Court ====
Taylor: 50–60% 60–70% 70–80% 80–90% Lazar: 50–60% 60–70%

A regularly scheduled Wisconsin Supreme Court election was on the ballot for the spring general election, April 7, 2026, for a ten-year term on the court. The incumbent justice, Rebecca Bradley, did not run for re-election, retiring after 11 years on the court. Wisconsin Court of Appeals judge Chris Taylor defeated fellow Court of Appeals judge Maria S. Lazar, expanding the liberal majority on the court from 4–3 to 5–2.

Wisconsin Supreme Court Election, 2026
Party	Candidate	Votes	%	±%
General Election, April 7, 2026
Nonpartisan	Chris Taylor	905,490	60.09%	
Nonpartisan	Maria S. Lazar	600,256	39.84%	
	Scattering	1,096	0.07%	+0.01pp
Plurality		305,111	20.25%	+10.16pp
Total votes		1,506,442	100.0%	-36.30%

==== State Court of Appeals ====
Three seats on the Wisconsin Court of Appeals were on the ballot for the spring general election, April 7, 2026.

- In District I, incumbent judge Joe Donald was unopposed for a second six-year term. He was appointed to the court by Governor Tony Evers in 2019 and won election in 2020 without opposition.
- In District II, incumbent judge Lisa Neubauer did not seek a fourth six-year term. Conservative attorney Anthony LoCoco was elected without opposition. Administrative law judge Christine Hansen sought to run, but was disqualified by the Wisconsin Elections Commission because her nomination forms were notarized by her husband, making the notarization voidable under Wisconsin law.
- In District IV, incumbent judge Rachel A. Graham was unopposed for a second six-year term. She was appointed to the court by Governor Tony Evers in 2019 and won election in 2020 without opposition.

==== State circuit courts ====
Twenty six of the state's 261 circuit court seats were on the ballot for the Spring general election, April 7, 2026. Only six seats were contested; four incumbent judges faced a challenger, one was defeated.

- In Dane County's branch 1 race, incumbent judge Benjamin Jones defeated a challenge from immigration law advocate Huma Ahsan. Attorney Nathan Wagner was eliminated in the primary.
- In the Florence & Forest county race, attorney Robert A. Kennedy Jr. defeated incumbent district attorney Alex Seifert for the judicial seat being vacated by the retirement of judge Leon D. Stenz.
- In Marathon County's branch 3 race, attorney Michael D. Hughes defeated attorney Douglas Bauman for the seat being vacated by the retirement of judge Lamont K. Jacobson.
- In Washburn County, incumbent judge Angeline E. Winton-Roe defeated a challenge from incumbent district attorney Aaron B. Marcoux.
- In Washington County's branch 2 race, assistant district attorney Grant Scaife defeated incumbent circuit judge Gordon Leech.
- In Wood County's branch 3 race, incumbent judge Emily Nolan-Plutchak defeated a challenge from former Langlade County District Attorney Elizabeth Gebert.

Circuit	Branch	Incumbent		Elected			Defeated		
Circuit	Branch	Name	Entered office	Name	Votes	%	Name	Votes	%
Barron	3	Maureen D. Boyle	2014	Maureen D. Boyle	8,652	99.24%	--Unopposed--		
Brown	8	Beau G. Liegeois	2019	Beau G. Liegeois	42,255	98.72%	--Unopposed--		
Chippewa	3	Benjamin J. Lane	2020	Benjamin J. Lane	11,198	98.91%	--Unopposed--		
Dane	1	Benjamin Jones	2025	Benjamin Jones	98,072	55.66%	Huma Ahsan	77,367	43.91%
Dane	8	Stephanie Hilton	2025	Stephanie Hilton	140,195	99.05%	--Unopposed--		
Dodge	1	Brian A. Pfitzinger	2008	Brian A. Pfitzinger	15,463	100.0%	--Unopposed--		
Dodge	4	Kristine A. Snow	2020	Kristine A. Snow	15,709	100.0%	--Unopposed--		
Dunn	1	James M. Peterson	2014	James M. Peterson	8,109	100.0%	--Unopposed--		
Florence–Forest		Leon D. Stenz	2008	Robert A. Kennedy Jr.	2,179	57.01%	Alex Seifert	1,640	42.91%
Iron		Anthony J. Stella Jr.	2019	Anthony J. Stella Jr.	1,274	99.84%	--Unopposed--		
Juneau	2	Paul S. Curran	2008	Paul S. Curran	4,737	99.39%	--Unopposed--		
Marathon	3	Lamont K. Jacobson	2013	Michael D. Hughes	18,720	64.60%	Douglas Bauman	10,180	35.13%
Milwaukee	2	Milton Childs	2019	Milton Childs	120,482	98.77%	--Unopposed--		
Milwaukee	7	Thomas J. McAdams	2014	Susan M. Roth	119,303	98.75%	--Unopposed--		
Milwaukee	16	Brittany Grayson	2019	Brittany Grayson	119,845	98.86%	--Unopposed--		
Milwaukee	27	Kevin E. Martens	2001	Kevin E. Martens	118,171	98.73%	--Unopposed--		
Milwaukee	29	Rebecca A. Kiefer	2020	Rebecca A. Kiefer	119,135	98.81%	--Unopposed--		
Milwaukee	32	Laura Gramling Perez	2014	Laura Gramling Perez	119,567	98.87%	--Unopposed--		
Outagamie	2	Emily I. Lonergan	2019	Emily I. Lonergan	33,276	100.0%	--Unopposed--		
Outagamie	3	Mitchell J. Metropulos	2007	Kyle Joseph Sargent	32,554	100.0%	--Unopposed--		
St. Croix	1	Scott J. Nordstrand	2019	Scott J. Nordstrand	17,041	98.49%	--Unopposed--		
Washburn		Angeline E. Winton-Roe	2019	Angeline E. Winton-Roe	2,795	58.56%	Aaron B. Marcoux	1,973	41.34%
Washington	2	Gordon Leech	2025	Grant Scaife	22,211	60.54%	Gordon Leech	14,352	39.12%
Waukesha	5	Jack Melvin	2020	Jack Melvin	84,825	98.26%	--Unopposed--		
Waupaca	2	Vicki L. Clussman	2014	Vicki L. Clussman	10,252	99.16%	--Unopposed--		
Wood	3	Emily Nolan-Plutchak	2025	Emily Nolan-Plutchak	9,588	51.67%	Elizabeth Gebert	8,929	48.12%

=== Ballot measures ===
Three new amendments to the Constitution of Wisconsin are presented to voters for ratification at the fall general election, November 3, 2026.

==== Question 1 ====
This amendment would attempt to place new limits on the partial veto powers of the governor of Wisconsin, to prohibit the governor from creating or increasing or authorizing new taxes or fees through the exercise of a partial veto. This was proposed by Republican lawmakers largely in response to Governor Tony Evers' partial veto in the 2023 state budget, which authorized municipalities to increase education funding through referendums for "400 years".

The question reads:

Partial veto. Shall section 10(1)(c) of article V of the constitution be amended to prohibit the governor, in exercising his or her partial veto authority, from creating or increasing or authorizing the creation or increase of any tax or fee?

==== Question 2 ====
This amendment would attempt to insulate religious institutions from future state government emergency orders. This amendment was proposed by Republican lawmakers as a reaction to the public health lockdowns that occurred during the COVID-19 pandemic of 2020–2023.

The question reads:

Freedom to gather in places of worship during an emergency. Shall section 18 of article I of the constitution, which deals with religious liberty, be amended to prohibit the state or a political subdivision of the state from ordering the closure of, or forbidding gatherings in, places of worship in response to a state of emergency, including a public health emergency?

==== Question 3 ====
This amendment would attempt to prevent entities of the state government from discriminating or granting any preferential treatment on the basis of race, sex, color, ethnicity, or national origin. This amendment was devised by Republican lawmakers as an attempt to ban diversity, equity, and inclusion policies from state government.

The question reads:

Governmental entity discrimination prohibited. Shall section 27 of article I of the constitution be created to prohibit governmental entities in the state from discriminating against, or granting preferential treatment to, any individual or group on the basis of race, sex, color, ethnicity, or national origin in public employment, public education, public contracting, or public administration?

== Local offices ==
=== Brown County ===
==== De Pere mayor ====
A regularly scheduled mayoral election was held in De Pere, Wisconsin, concurrent with the Spring general election, April 7, 2026. Incumbent mayor James Boyd was re-elected without opposition.

=== Kenosha County ===
==== Kenosha County executive ====
A regularly scheduled county executive election was held in Kenosha County, concurrent with the Spring general election, April 7, 2026. Incumbent county executive Samantha Kerkman was re-elected without opposition.

=== Manitowoc County ===
==== Manitowoc County executive ====
A regularly scheduled county executive election was held in Manitowoc County, concurrent with the Spring general election, April 7, 2026. Incumbent county executive Bob Ziegelbauer declined to seek re-election. Manitowoc County Board chair Tyler Martell was elected without opposition.

=== Pierce County ===
==== River Falls mayor ====
A regularly scheduled mayoral election was held in River Falls, Wisconsin, concurrent with the Spring general election, April 7, 2026. Incumbent mayor Dan Toland was defeated by River Falls school board member Alison H. Page.

=== Waukesha County ===
==== Waukesha County executive ====
A special election for Waukesha County executive will be held on December 15, 2026, to fill the vacancy caused by the death of Paul Farrow; if three or more candidates run, a special nonpartisan primary will be held on November 17, 2026. Republican state senator Chris Kapenga and Republican state representative Adam Neylon have declared their candidacy for the office.

==== Delafield mayor ====
A regularly scheduled mayoral election was held in Delafield, Wisconsin, concurrent with the Spring general election, April 7, 2026. Incumbent mayor Tim Aicher defeated businessman Aaron Werner in the general election to win a second two-year term.

==== Muskego mayor ====
A regularly scheduled mayoral election was held in Muskego, Wisconsin, concurrent with the Spring general election, April 7, 2026. Incumbent mayor Rick Petfalski defeated former Mayor Kathy Chiaverotti in the general election.

==== Oconomowoc mayor ====
A regularly scheduled mayoral election was held in Oconomowoc, Wisconsin, concurrent with the Spring general election, April 7, 2026. Incumbent mayor Robert Magnus did not run for re-election. City councilmember Matthew Rosek was elected mayor, defeating fellow councilmember Karen Spiegelberg.

==== Waukesha mayor ====
A regularly scheduled mayoral election was held in Waukesha, Wisconsin, concurrent with the Spring general election, April 7, 2026. Incumbent mayor Shawn Reilly, first elected in 2014, did not seek re-election. City council president Alicia Halvensleben was elected mayor, defeating incumbent state representative Scott Allen.

=== Winnebago County ===
==== Neenah mayor ====
A regularly scheduled mayoral election was held in Neenah, Wisconsin, concurrent with the Spring general election, April 7, 2026. Incumbent mayor Jane Lang did not run for re-election. School teacher Brian Borchardt was elected mayor, defeating policy consultant Scott Becher.
