= 2026 Waukesha mayoral election =

Local election in Wisconsin, US

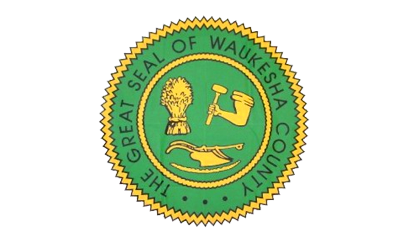
- April 7, 2026
Candidate	Alicia Halvensleben	Scott Allen
Popular vote	9,535	9,081
Percentage	51.2%	48.7%
Mayor before election
Shawn Reilly
Elected mayor
Alicia Halvensleben

The 2026 Waukesha mayoral election was held on April 7, 2026, to elect the mayor of Waukesha, Wisconsin, to a four-year term. Incumbent mayor Shawn Reilly did not run for re-election. Council president Alicia Halvensleben defeated state assemblymember Scott Allen with 51% of the vote.

== Candidates ==
=== Declared ===
- Scott Allen, Republican state assemblymember (2015–present)
- Alicia Halvensleben, president of the city common council

=== Declined ===
- Shawn Reilly, incumbent mayor

== Endorsements ==
Scott Allen

State senators

- Julian Bradley, state senator from the 28th district (2021–present) (Republican)

State assemblymembers

- Tyler August, majority leader of the Wisconsin State Assembly (2023–present) from the 31st district (2011–present) (Republican)
- Dave Maxey, state assemblymember from the 83rd district (2023–present) (Republican
- Adam Neylon, state assemblymember from the 15th district (2013–present) (Republican)
- Chuck Wichgers, state assemblymember from the 84th district (2017–present) (Republican)

Local officials

- Paul Farrow, county executive of Waukesha County (2015–present) (Republican)
Alicia Halvensleben

Local officials

- Shawn Reilly, incumbent mayor (Independent)

Organizations

- AFL-CIO
- Young Democrats of Wisconsin

Political parties

- Democratic Party of Wisconsin
- Waukesha County Democratic Party
- Working Families Party

== Results ==
2026 Waukesha mayoral election
Candidate	Votes	%
Alicia Halvensleben	9,535	51.15
Scott Allen	9,081	48.72
Write-in	25	0.13
Total votes	18,641	100.00

== See also ==
- 2026 Wisconsin elections
