= Clair H. Voss =

American lawyer and judge (1920–1999)

The Honorable Clair H. Voss

Judge of the Wisconsin Court of Appeals District II
- In office August 1, 1978 – November 23, 1984
- Preceded by: Position established
- Succeeded by: Neal Nettesheim

Wisconsin Circuit Court Judge for the Waukesha Circuit, Branch 7
- In office August 1, 1985 – July 31, 1997
- Preceded by: Jess Martinez, Jr.
- Succeeded by: J. Mac Davis

Wisconsin Circuit Court Judge for the 22nd Circuit, Branch 2
- In office May 1, 1960 – July 31, 1978
- Preceded by: Position established
- Succeeded by: Position abolished

Personal details
- Born: Clair Horton Voss; September 16, 1920 Antigo, Wisconsin, US
- Died: August 10, 1999 (aged 78) Oconomowoc, Wisconsin, US
- Resting place: Saint Joseph Cemetery; Waukesha, Wisconsin
- Spouses: Betty Kivlan; (m. 1944; died 1978); Joanne Foley; (m. 1980)
- Children: 3 sons, 1 daughter; 6 stepchildren
- Education: Marquette University (B.A., LL.B.); Marquette University Law School (J.D.)

Military service
- Allegiance: United States of America
- Branch/service: United States Marine Corps
- Years of service: 1944-1945
- Rank: 1st Lieutenant
- Unit: 27th Marine Regiment, 5th Marine Division
- Battles/wars: World War II: Pacific War; Battle of Iwo Jima
- Awards: Navy Cross; Purple Heart; Presidential Unit Citation

Clair Horton Voss (September 16, 1920 – August 10, 1999) was an American lawyer and judge. He was the first presiding judge of the Wisconsin Court of Appeals in District II, serving from 1978 through 1984. He also served 30 years as a Wisconsin Circuit Court judge in Waukesha County and was a decorated veteran of World War II.

== Early life ==
Voss was born in Antigo, Wisconsin, on September 16, 1920. He attended Marquette University and earned his Bachelor's degree. At Marquette, he also played on the varsity football team. He lived briefly in Chicago before being commissioned as an officer for service in World War II.

== World War II ==
During the war, Voss was a platoon commander with Company A, 1st Battalion, 27th Marine Regiment, 5th Marine Division. The unit received a Presidential Unit Citation for the Battle of Iwo Jima. Lieutenant Voss was individually awarded the Navy Cross and Purple Heart for his actions in the battle, but he was grievously wounded—shrapnel from a mortar round lacerated his arms, legs, and head, severed his nose, and pierced his lung. He was evacuated and spent the rest of the war recuperating. He would carry shrapnel in his skull for the rest of his life.

== Career ==
Following the war, Voss returned to school and earned his Juris Doctor degree from the Marquette University Law School in 1948. He practiced law for several years, but, in 1956, took a job as an assistant district attorney in Waukesha County, thus beginning a career in public service that would last the rest of his life. In 1960, Voss was elected to a newly created Wisconsin circuit court judgeship in the Waukesha-based 22nd circuit. He would earn re-election in 1965, 1971, and 1977, and, when the court system of Wisconsin was reorganized in 1978, he was elected to the newly created Wisconsin Court of Appeals. On the Court of Appeals, he was made presiding judge for the Waukesha-based District II. Shortly after his arrival on the court, his first wife, Betty, died. He then suffered a heart attack, underwent surgery, and was temporarily blind. The personal tragedies likely compounded his distaste for the appellate court's work. He resigned in 1984, one year before the end of his term.

The next year, Judge Voss opted to return to the trial bench, running for election to the Wisconsin circuit court in Waukesha County. He narrowly defeated incumbent Judge Jess Martinez Jr., in the April 1985 election, and would go on to win re-election one more time in 1991. He retired at the end of his second six-year term in this office, July 31, 1997.

== Personal life and family ==
On May 27, 1944, Voss was married to Betty Kivlan, of Evanston, Illinois, in a military chapel in Quantico, Virginia. After her death, in 1978, Voss married widow Joanne Foley. Voss had three sons and a daughter with Betty Kivlan; Joanne Foley had six children from her first marriage.

Voss chaired the local affiliations of the American Red Cross and March of Dimes and was active in the American Legion, Veterans of Foreign Wars, Disabled American Veterans and the Legion of Valor of the United States of America, Incorporated. He was also active in his local church and coached grade school football and basketball teams.

Judge Voss died August 10, 1999, in Waukesha, Wisconsin.

== Navy Cross citation ==
Lieutenant Voss was awarded the Navy Cross in October 1945 for his actions at Iwo Jima, the citation for the award reads:

The President of the United States takes pleasure in presenting the Navy Cross to Clair Horton Voss (0-38521), Second Lieutenant, U.S. Marine Corps (Reserve), for extraordinary heroism while serving with a Platoon of Company A, First Battalion, Twenty-Seventh Marines, FIFTH Marine Division, in action against enemy Japanese forces on Iwo Jima, Volcano Islands, on 27 February 1945. Although several previous attempts had failed to destroy a pillbox which had pinned down his platoon with heavy machine-gun fire during its advance toward the high ground to its immediate front, Second Lieutenant Voss realized that the enemy position was holding up the advance of the entire company. Arming himself with hand grenades and demolitions, he crawled forward to the rear of the pillbox where he succeeded in silencing the machine gun with hand grenades. Despite the heavy machine-gun fire from adjacent hostile positions, he approached the pillbox, climbed to the top and completely annihilated the remaining Japanese personnel with a demolition charge. By his initiative and courage, he made possible the continued advance of his company, and his gallant devotion to duty was in keeping with the highest traditions of the United States Naval Service.

Bureau of Naval Personnel Information Bulletin No. 343 (October 1945)

Legal offices
New branch	Wisconsin Circuit Court Judge for the 22nd Circuit, Branch 2; 1960 – 1978	Circuit abolished
New court	Judge of the Wisconsin Court of Appeals District II; 1985 – 1997	Succeeded by Neal Nettesheim
Preceded by Jess Martinez, Jr.	Wisconsin Circuit Court Judge for the Waukesha Circuit, Branch 7; 1985 – 1997	Succeeded by J. Mac Davis
