= Jeffrey A. Neubauer =

American businessman and politician (born 1955)

Jeffrey Neubauer

Chair of the Democratic Party of Wisconsin
- In office 1989–1993
- Preceded by: Suellen Albrecht
- Succeeded by: Marlys Matuszak

Member of the Wisconsin State Assembly from the 62nd district
- In office January 7, 1985 – January 3, 1989
- Preceded by: William A. Kasten
- Succeeded by: Kimberly Plache
- In office January 5, 1981 – January 3, 1983
- Preceded by: R. Michael Ferrall
- Succeeded by: William A. Kasten

Member of the Wisconsin State Assembly from the 19th district
- In office January 3, 1983 – January 7, 1985
- Preceded by: R. Michael Ferrall
- Succeeded by: Louise M. Tesmer

Personal details
- Born: December 8, 1955 (age 70) Racine, Wisconsin, U.S.
- Spouse: Lisa S. Neubauer
- Children: 3, including Greta Neubauer
- Education: Stanford University (BA)

Jeffrey A. Neubauer (born December 8, 1955) is an American businessman and politician from Racine, Wisconsin. He served as chairman of the Democratic Party of Wisconsin from 1989 to 1993, and represented Racine County for four terms in the Wisconsin State Assembly (1981–1989).

Neubauer's wife, Lisa Neubauer, is a judge of the Wisconsin Court of Appeals. Their daughter, Greta Neubauer, is a current member of the Wisconsin State Assembly, and the Democratic minority leader.

== Early life and education ==
Neubauer was born on December 8, 1955, in Racine, Wisconsin. He graduated from Jerome I. Case High School in Mount Pleasant, Wisconsin, and Stanford University, where he earned a B.A. and did graduate work.

== Career ==
Neubauer started his political career as an aide to Congressman Les Aspin (WI-01). He was elected to the Assembly in 1980, where he served for four terms, leaving in 1989. After leaving office he was elected chairman of the Wisconsin Democratic Party for four years. Neubauer also served as Bill Clinton's campaign manager for Wisconsin in both 1992 and 1996; Clinton carried the state both times.

In 1993, when Aspin was named Clinton's Secretary of Defense, Neubauer ran for congress in the special election, but lost the primary to Peter W. Barca.

== Personal life ==
Neubauer is married to Lisa S. Neubauer, Chief Judge of the Wisconsin Court of Appeals and 2019 candidate for Wisconsin Supreme Court. Together they have three children, including Greta Neubauer, a current member of the Wisconsin State Assembly. Neubauer resides in Racine, Wisconsin.

== Electoral history ==
=== Wisconsin Assembly 62nd District (1980) ===
Wisconsin Assembly, 62nd District Election, 1980
| Party | Candidate | Votes | % | ±% |
|---|---|---|---|---|
Primary Election
| Republican | Ronney Anton | 2,401 | 36.98% | |
| Democratic | Jeffrey A. Neubauer | 1,870 | 28.80% | |
| Democratic | Douglas N. Musurlian | 1,348 | 20.76% | |
| Democratic | Marvin J. Happel | 742 | 11.43% | |
| Democratic | Gregory M. Mach | 132 | 2.03% | |
| Total votes | | 6,493 | 100.0% | |
General Election
| Democratic | Jeffrey A. Neubauer | 11,155 | 63.45% | −2.70% |
| Republican | Ronney Anton | 6,427 | 36.55% | |
| Total votes | | 17,582 | 100.0% | +44.68% |
| Democratic hold | | | | |

=== Wisconsin Assembly 19th District (1982) ===
Wisconsin Assembly, 19th District Election, 1982
| Party | Candidate | Votes | % | ±% |
|---|---|---|---|---|
Primary Election
| Democratic | Jeffrey A. Neubauer | 3,764 | 80.46% | |
| Republican | Delores Laveau | 914 | 19.54% | |
| Total votes | | 4,678 | 100.0% | |
General Election
| Democratic | Jeffrey A. Neubauer | 9,791 | 67.51% | −3.03% |
| Republican | Delores Laveau | 4,712 | 32.49% | |
| Total votes | | 14,503 | 100.0% | -23.05% |
| Democratic hold | | | | |

=== Wisconsin Assembly 62nd District (1984, 1986) ===
Wisconsin Assembly, 62nd District Election, 1984
| Party | Candidate | Votes | % | ±% |
|---|---|---|---|---|
Primary Election
| Democratic | Jeffrey A. Neubauer | 2,074 | 85.31% | |
| Democratic | George W. Goodwater | 357 | 14.69% | |
| Total votes | | 2,431 | 100.0% | |
General Election
| Democratic | Jeffrey A. Neubauer | 14,653 | 100.00% | +55.88% |
| Total votes | | 14,653 | 100.0% | -16.66% |
| Democratic gain from Republican | | | | |

Wisconsin Assembly, 62nd District Election, 1986
| Party | Candidate | Votes | % | ±% |
|---|---|---|---|---|
Primary Election
| Democratic | Jeffrey A. Neubauer (incumbent) | 2,221 | 62.67% | |
| Republican | R. Frenchy Boutan | 1,323 | 37.33% | |
| Total votes | | 3,544 | 100.0% | |
General Election
| Democratic | Jeffrey A. Neubauer (incumbent) | 8,456 | 61.69% | −38.31% |
| Republican | R. Frenchy Boutan | 5,252 | 38.31% | |
| Total votes | | 13,708 | 100.0% | -17.62% |
| Democratic hold | | | | |

=== U.S. House of Representatives (1993) ===
Wisconsin's 1st Congressional District Special Election, 1993
| Party | Candidate | Votes | % | ±% |
|---|---|---|---|---|
Democratic Primary Election, April 6, 1993
| Democratic | Peter W. Barca | 31,073 | 48.67% | |
| Democratic | Jeffrey A. Neubauer | 21,610 | 33.85% | |
| Democratic | Wayne W. Wood | 8,254 | 12.93% | |
| Democratic | Jeffrey C. Thomas | 1,814 | 2.84% | |
| Democratic | Samuel Platts | 1,094 | 1.71% | |
| Total votes | | 63,845 | 100.0% | |
