= Glenn Robert Davis =

American politician (1914–1988)

Glenn Davis
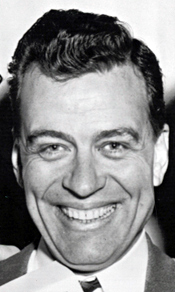
- Davis in 1956

Member of the U.S. House of Representatives from Wisconsin
- In office January 3, 1965 – December 31, 1974
- Preceded by: Lester Johnson
- Succeeded by: Bob Kasten
- Constituency: 9th district
- In office April 22, 1947 – January 3, 1957
- Preceded by: Robert Henry
- Succeeded by: Donald Tewes
- Constituency: 2nd district

Member of the Wisconsin State Assembly from the Waukesha 1st district
- In office January 6, 1941 – June 1942
- Preceded by: Lyle E. Douglass
- Succeeded by: Frederic Woodhead

Personal details
- Born: Glenn Robert Davis; October 28, 1914 Vernon, Wisconsin, U.S.
- Died: September 21, 1988 (aged 73) Arlington, Virginia, U.S.
- Party: Republican
- Children: J. Mac Davis
- Education: University of Wisconsin, Platteville (BA); University of Wisconsin, Madison (JD)

Military service
- Branch/service: United States Navy
- Years of service: 1942–1945
- Rank: Lieutenant
- Battles/wars: World War II

Glenn Robert Davis (October 28, 1914 – September 21, 1988) was an American lawyer and Republican politician from Waukesha County, Wisconsin. He served ten terms in the U.S. House of Representatives, representing Wisconsin's 2nd congressional district from 1947 to 1957, then representing Wisconsin's 9th congressional district from 1965 to 1975. Before serving in Congress, he served one term in the Wisconsin State Assembly, but resigned to enlist in the U.S. Navy for World War II.

His son, J. Mac Davis, served eight years as a Wisconsin state senator, then served 25 years as a Wisconsin circuit court judge in Waukesha County.

== Early life and education ==
Davis was born on a small farm to a poor family in Vernon, Wisconsin. He excelled academically despite pressure from his father to forsake school for farming. He skipped several grades and was a teacher of the younger children in his one-room school house before he graduated three years early from Mukwonago High School in 1930 at 15.

=== Early career ===
Davis attended the Platteville State Teachers College (now the University of Wisconsin–Platteville) with a donation from his mother (who had been hiding the money from her husband for just such an occasion). He majored in education and went on to teach high school at Cottage Grove and Waupun for five years. Davis then went back to school, earning a Juris Doctor degree from the University of Wisconsin–Madison in 1940.

After passing the bar, Davis opened a law firm in Waukesha, Wisconsin. From this perch, he launched his first campaign for public office, with a successful bid for the Wisconsin State Assembly in 1940.

He later lived in New Berlin, Wisconsin, and Wauwatosa, Wisconsin.

== Military service ==
After a year in the legislature, Davis resigned his seat to join the U.S. Navy, after the Japanese attack on Pearl Harbor. Lieutenant Davis served as the Communications officer aboard the USS Sangamon (CVE-26), an escort carrier. The ship sustained a kamikaze attack in the latter days of the war off of Okinawa, which Davis survived.

== Political career ==
Davis resumed the practice of law after being honorably discharged from the Navy, on December 12, 1945. He also stepped up his involvement in politics, serving briefly as a local court commissioner and attending Republican Party functions. Davis was elected as a delegate to every Republican National Convention from 1952 to 1972.

=== Congress ===
In 1947, Davis ran in the special election to succeed Robert Kirkland Henry, a Republican congressman who died just weeks after being elected to a second term. Davis served five terms in the House of Representatives representing Wisconsin's 2nd congressional district, before deciding to seek higher office in 1956. Instead of running for reelection, he launched an unsuccessful primary challenge to incumbent Republican Senator Alexander Wiley.

In 1957, Davis ran unsuccessfully to become the GOP candidate in the special primary to replace the late Senator Joseph McCarthy. The Republican nod instead went to former Gov. Walter J. Kohler Jr., who went on to lose the seat to Democrat William Proxmire. Davis subsequently returned to his law practice.

Eight years later, in 1964, Davis made a successful comeback bid by winning the open ninth congressional district, left open due to redistricting. He served another four terms before losing in the 1974 primary to a conservative up-and-comer, State Senator Bob Kasten. Davis felt he was hurt by the then-unpopular pardon of Richard Nixon by then President Gerald Ford on the Sunday before the primary election. Davis had been closely associated with Ford and Nixon, being in the Oval Office the night the former president (Nixon) resigned.

Davis's congressional service was marked by a generally conservative record that grew more moderate in the early 1970s. The Republican leadership placed him on the exclusive Appropriations Committee in his third term. In his fourth term he became a "cardinal," chairing the Subcommittee on Civil Functions and Military Construction. With the Republican loss of the House in the 84th Congress he became the ranking Republican on the Subcommittee on Public Works. After his hiatus he was returned to Appropriations and ranking on the Subcommittee on District of Columbia. Late in the 93rd Congress he returned to ranking on the Public Works Subcommittee. Davis was hardly a team player on a committee largely interested in directing public funds to members' districts. Former House Minority Leader Gerald Ford wrote in the foreword to Smith's biography of Davis: "Even when leaders from both political parties wanted some cooperation and compromise, Glenn could be almost impossible." He achieved perhaps his greatest mark as a close friend and golf partner of Ford's. Davis was also the star shortstop for the "Washington Senators," a recreational baseball team made up solely of congressmen.

To this day, Davis remains the sole native of Waukesha County to have held congressional office.

Davis voted in favor of the Voting Rights Act and Civil Rights Act of 1968.

== Later years ==
After his loss in the primary, Davis resigned on December 31, 1974, just days before his term would have otherwise ended. He moved permanently to Arlington, Virginia. Davis worked as a consultant for Potter International, Inc. from 1975 to 1983.

== Death and legacy ==
Davis died in Arlington on September 21, 1988 at the age of 73.

Part of Davis's legacy is the Glenn R. Davis Charitable Foundation, a scholarship organization funded and administered by his family. The Glenn Davis Charitable Foundation gives a monetary award to one graduating student in each Waukesha County high school every year. The award is granted to a student who has done something to overcome substantial obstacles, reflecting Davis's own rise from a family of pickle farmers to U.S. congressman.

== Family ==
Glenn Davis' son J. Mac Davis formerly served as a Wisconsin Circuit Court judge, Waukesha County, and a Wisconsin State Senator.

U.S. House of Representatives
Preceded by Robert Henry	Member of the U.S. House of Representatives from Wisconsin's 2nd congressional district 1947–1957	Succeeded by Donald Tewes
Preceded by Lester Johnson	Member of the U.S. House of Representatives from Wisconsin's 9th congressional district 1965–1974	Succeeded by Bob Kasten
