= Anthony LoCoco =

American judge (born 1990)

Judge of the Wisconsin Court of Appeals District II
- Incumbent
- Assumed office August 1, 2026
- Preceded by: Lisa Neubauer

Personal details
- Born: 1990 (age 35–36) Milwaukee, Wisconsin, U.S.
- Spouse: Married
- Children: 4
- Education: University of Dallas (B.A.); Harvard Law School (J.D.)
- Profession: Lawyer
- Website: Official website

Anthony F. LoCoco (born 1990) is an American lawyer and jurist from Waukesha County, Wisconsin. He is a judge of the Wisconsin Court of Appeals in the Waukesha-based District II, since 2026. Before being elected to the Court of Appeals, he worked as chief counsel for the conservative think tank Institute for Reforming Government, and deputy counsel to the conservative nonprofit law firm Wisconsin Institute for Law and Liberty. Earlier in his career, he served as a law clerk to Wisconsin Supreme Court justice Annette Ziegler.

== Biography ==
Anthony LoCoco was born in 1990 in Milwaukee, Wisconsin. He was raised in nearby Elm Grove, Wisconsin, and graduated from Marquette University High School in 2008.

He attended the University of Dallas, obtaining his bachelor's degree in 2012, then immediately went on to Harvard Law School. After earning his J.D. in 2015, he quickly returned to Wisconsin and was hired as a law clerk for Wisconsin Supreme Court justice Annette Ziegler. He served two years with Ziegler, then took a job at the major Milwaukee law firm Foley & Lardner.

After a year at Foley & Lardner, LoCoco was hired as an associate counsel at the conservative nonprofit law firm Wisconsin Institute for Law and Liberty (WILL). LoCoco was promoted to deputy counsel at WILL in 2019, ultimately remaining with the organization until 2023. LoCoco was involved in several prominent cases during his time at WILL, including Bartlett v. Evers, a challenge to Governor Tony Evers's use of line-item veto, and Johnson v. WEC, the Wisconsin Supreme Court case that resulted in Wisconsin's 2022 redistricting. He was also involved in less well-known litigation,

In 2023, LoCoco left WILL to work briefly for the conservative think tank Institute for Reforming Government, where former Republican governor Scott Walker served as chair. Later that year, however, LoCoco started his own firm, specializing in Wisconsin appellate cases, known as Wisconsin Appellate Litigation Services LLC.

In June 2025, LoCoco announced that he would run for the Wisconsin Court of Appeals in 2026, challenging incumbent judge Lisa Neubauer in the Waukesha-based District II. In announcing his candidacy, he also announced endorsements from Wisconsin Supreme Court justices Annette Ziegler and Rebecca Bradley; a short time later he received the endorsement of former governor Scott Walker. Neubauer ultimately announced in October that she would retire rather than running for a fourth six-year term. After Neubauer's withdrawal, LoCoco was set to face administrative law judge Christine Hansen of Waukesha, but Hansen's name was removed from the ballot due to a technicality. LoCoco was unopposed in the April 2026 election and received 97% of the vote.

LoCoco was sworn in as judge on August 1, 2026.

== Electoral history ==
=== Wisconsin Court of Appeals (2026) ===
Wisconsin Court of Appeals, District II Election, 2026
Party	Candidate	Votes	%	±%
General election, April 7, 2026
Nonpartisan	Anthony LoCoco	290,553	97.64%	
	Scattering	7,031	2.36%	
Total votes		297,584	100.0%	-36.53%

Legal offices
Preceded by Lisa Neubauer	Judge of the Wisconsin Court of Appeals District II; August 1, 2026 – present	Incumbent
