= Scott Allen (politician) =

American politician and businessman

Member of the Wisconsin State Assembly
- Incumbent
- Assumed office January 6, 2025
- Preceded by: Chuck Wichgers
- Succeeded by: Bryson Reyes (elect)
- Constituency: 82nd district
- In office January 5, 2015 – January 6, 2025
- Preceded by: Bill Kramer
- Succeeded by: Cindi Duchow
- Constituency: 97th district

Personal details
- Born: December 18, 1965 (age 60) Racine, Wisconsin, U.S.
- Party: Republican
- Education: University of Wisconsin–Oshkosh; University of Wisconsin–Waukesha; University of Wisconsin–Milwaukee (BA); University of Southern California (MPA, MUP)
- Website: Official website

Military service
- Allegiance: United States
- Branch/service: United States Army; U.S. Army Reserve
- Rank: Sergeant

Scott Allen (born December 18, 1965) is an American businessman and Republican politician from Waukesha, Wisconsin. He is a member of the Wisconsin State Assembly, representing Wisconsin's 82nd Assembly district since 2025; he previously represented the 97th Assembly district from 2015 to 2025. He was an unsuccessful candidate for mayor of Waukesha in the 2026 election.

== Biography ==
Scott Allen was born in Racine, Wisconsin, on December 18, 1965.

Allen served in the United States Army Reserve and received his bachelor's degree in political science from the University of Wisconsin–Milwaukee and his master's degree in urban planning/public administration. He also went to University of Wisconsin–Oshkosh and University of Wisconsin–Waukesha. Allen is in the real estate business. He also served on the Waukesha Common Council (1998-2001) and the Waukesha County Community Development Block Grant Board. He is a Republican.

On November 4, 2014, Allen was elected to the Wisconsin State Assembly, representing the 97th Assembly District. 2023 Wisconsin Act 94 renumbered legislative districts and moved legislative boundaries. Allen now represents the constituents of the 82nd Assembly District, covering most of the City of Waukesha and parts of the Village of Waukesha.

== Legislation ==
=== Veterans ===
Rep. Allen authored 2015 Wisconsin Act 386. This bill established the Wisconsin Veterans Employment Initiative to increase the number of veterans holding permanent positions in state government. It created a structured program to prioritize and facilitate veteran hiring within state agencies. The legislation also established a Council on Veterans Employment to oversee and promote those efforts.

Allen has served on the Assembly Veterans and Military Affairs Committee in multiple sessions.

=== Kai 11 Act ===
Allen also authored 2021 Wisconsin Act 210, the Kai 11 Bill. The legislation required the Wisconsin Department of Education to develop and distribute an information sheet on sudden cardiac arrest (SCA) risks, symptoms, and prevention to youth participating in athletic activities, similar to existing youth concussion awareness laws. The bill mandated that the information be provided alongside concussion protocols to parents or guardians, coaches, and others involved in youth sports.

The bill was inspired by the sudden cardiac arrest death of Waukesha teenager Kai Lermer, a high school athlete who passed away during a pickup game of basketball with friends.

=== Election Integrity ===
Following the 2020 presidential election, Allen publicly called for greater scrutiny to address unanswered questions about election administration in Wisconsin. In an August 2021 press release, he supported Rep. Janel Brandtjen's efforts to gather evidence and conduct an outside, independent audit of voting records.

Allen was the lead sponsor in the Assembly for legislation to establish regular, random, post-election audits by the nonpartisan Legislative Audit Bureau. The bill, 2023 Senate Bill 736, passed the Assembly and Senate. However, Gov. Tony Evers vetoed the legislation.

In July of 2023, Allen proposed adding watermarks to Wisconsin's absentee ballots to prevent copying or forgery, likening it to security features on United States currency.

Allen coauthored 2025 AB 595 to enforce compliance with the federal Help America Vote Act by enabling voter regisration data-sharing agreements, removing ineligible voters from voter rolls, and adjusting fees for the official voter registration list. The bill addressed concerns about non-citizen voting and outdated registrations, providing the Wisconsin Elections Commission with tools to cross-reference data while respecting privacy laws. Gov. Evers vetoed the bill.

=== COVID-19 Response ===
Allen opposed mandatory mask mandates as an overreach of government authority that infringed on personal freedoms and individual choice. When Gov. Evers issued a statewide mask mandate, Rep. Allen criticized the policy as an "insult of the intelligence" of Wisconsin residents. When Evers extended the policy, Allen called it an "unconstitutional, unscientific travesty." Allen tested positive for COVID-19 in the fall of 2020.

Allen opposed mandatory COVID-19 vaccinations, arguing they infringe on individual autonomy and discriminate against people with contrary but sincerely held religious beliefs, health issues, and personal convictions. He called policies instructing unvaccinated Wisconsin State Capitol visitors to wear masks "discriminatory."

In 2021, he coauthored bills which would have prevented local officials from closing places of worship during emergencies such as the COVID-19 pandemic, emphasizing the First Amendment cannot be overridden by a state statute.

=== Education ===
Allen has supported numerous education reforms, including mandating teaching cursive writing in elementary school curricula, prohibiting race and sex stereotyping in schools and universities, and requiring public access to educational materials. He has also supported efforts to include Holocaust and genocide education. Allen is a supporter of school choice.

=== Waukesha Water ===
Rep. Allen supported the Waukesha Water Utility's long-term efforts to address elevated levels of naturally occurring radium in its groundwater supply, a challenge that dated back decades. As a local representative whose district includes Waukesha, Allen advocated for federal financing of the project. He and State Representative Adam Neylon also worked to amend state law to allow a 30-year repayment of state loans instead of 20 years, allowing costs to be fairly shared among users over time.

The radium issue arose because Waukesha's primary drinking water source, the deep sandstone aquifer, contained naturally elevated radium concentrations exceeding the U.S. Environmental Protection Agency's (EPA) maximum contamination level of 5 picocuries per liter (pCi/L). This led to costly interim treatments such as blending water from various wells and treating specific wells for radium removal. Alternatives like advanced treatment facilities were deemed prohibitively expensive, potentially doubling or tripling water bills, and environmentally disruptive. These factors led the city to pursue diverting Lake Michigan water as the most viable long-term fix.

Rep. Allen also coauthored 2021 Assembly Bill 393, which directed $530,000 in federal American Rescue Plan Act (ARPA) funds to the Waukesha Water Supply Control project. The grant would have addressed an unexpected $1.2 million budget shortfall resulting from changes to water and wastewater processing plans during construction of the diversion pipeline. The funds, authorized under ARPA for safe drinking water infrastructure, would have been routed through the Wisconsin Department of Administration as a grant, preventing costs from being passed directly to utility ratepayers. The bill passed the state Assembly but died in the Senate.

Waukesha celebrated the pipeline's completion in September 2023, fully transitioning to Lake Michigan water and resolving the radium compliance issues.

== Controversies ==
In 2015, Allen recorded a "Christmas message" for the Wisconsin Assembly Republicans' YouTube channel. In that video, he proselytizes, "For those who may watch this who are not Christians, I invite you to consider the hope offered by the Prince of Peace," and he quotes the Bible: “We are not of those who shrink back and are destroyed, but of those who believe and are saved" (Hebrews 10:39).

In June 2019, Allen criticized flying the Gay Pride flag over the Wisconsin capitol for LGBT Pride Month. He tweeted, "Is this any more appropriate than erecting the Christian flag over the Capitol?" In an interview with the Associated Press, he stated, the flag "advocates a behavior or lifestyle that some Wisconsin residents may not condone. Therefore, it is divisive."

In May 2025 Allen announced a campaign for Waukesha mayor in 2026, to succeed incumbent mayor Shawn Reilly, who is retiring at the end of his term.

In July 2025 Allen voted against the 2025-2027 biennial Wisconsin state budget, which had been negotiated between Democratic governor Tony Evers, as well as state legislative leaders from both parties.

On April 7, 2026, Allen lost the race for Waukesha Mayor to Alicia Halvensleben, the President of the Waukesha Common Council.

== Electoral history ==
=== Wisconsin Assembly, 97th district (2014–2022) ===
Year	Election	Date	Elected				Defeated				Total	Plurality
2014	Primary	Aug. 12	Scott Allen	Republican	2,004	33.85%	Brandon J. Rosner	Rep.	1,716	28.99%	5,920	288
2014	Primary	Aug. 12	Scott Allen	Republican	2,004	33.85%	Kathleen Cummings	Rep.	743	12.55%	5,920	288
2014	Primary	Aug. 12	Scott Allen	Republican	2,004	33.85%	Vince Trovato	Rep.	728	12.30%	5,920	288
2014	Primary	Aug. 12	Scott Allen	Republican	2,004	33.85%	Aaron D. Perry	Rep.	429	7.25%	5,920	288
2014	Primary	Aug. 12	Scott Allen	Republican	2,004	33.85%	Joe Banske	Rep.	300	5.07%	5,920	288
2014	General	Nov. 4	Scott Allen	Republican	17,804	97.83%	--Unopposed--				18,198	17,410
2016	General	Nov. 8	Scott Allen (inc)	Republican	21,611	97.63%	--Unopposed--				22,135	21,087
2018	General	Nov. 6	Scott Allen (inc)	Republican	18,945	96.03%	--Unopposed--				19,729	18,161
2020	General	Nov. 3	Scott Allen (inc)	Republican	18,556	59.16%	Aaron D. Perry	Dem.	12,770	40.72%	31,364	5,786
2022	General	Nov. 8	Scott Allen (inc)	Republican	20,691	96.14%	--Unopposed--				21,521	19,861

=== Wisconsin Assembly, 82nd district (2024) ===
Year	Election	Date	Elected				Defeated				Total	Plurality
2024	General	Nov. 5	Scott Allen	Republican	18,632	57.18%	Kevin Reilly	Dem.	13,917	42.71%	32,586	4,715

=== Waukesha Mayor (2026) ===
Year	Election	Date	Elected				Defeated				Total	Plurality
2026	General	Apr. 7	Alicia Halvensleben	Nonpartisan	9,535	51.15%	Scott Allen	Non.	9,081	48.72%	18,641	454

Wisconsin State Assembly
Preceded by Bill Kramer	Member of the Wisconsin State Assembly from the 97th district January 5, 2015 – January 6, 2025	Succeeded by Cindi Duchow
Preceded by Ken Skowronski	Member of the Wisconsin State Assembly from the 82nd district January 6, 2025 – present	Incumbent
