= Walter G. Caldwell =

American civil engineer and politician

Member of the Wisconsin State Assembly from the Waukesha 1 district
- In office 1933 - January 28, 1934
- Preceded by: Evan G. Davies
- Succeeded by: Lyle E. Douglass

Personal details
- Born: February 19, 1886 Pewaukee, Wisconsin
- Died: January 28, 1934 (aged 47) Waukesha, Wisconsin
- Party: Democratic
- Spouse: Florence Wettig Caldwell
- Education: Marquette University; University of Wisconsin

Walter Gaynor Caldwell (February 19, 1886 – January 28, 1934) was an American civil engineer and politician.

Born in Pewaukee, Wisconsin. Caldwell graduated from Pewaukee High School. He then went to Marquette University and then received his bachelor's degree in civil engineering from University of Wisconsin. He worked for the Wisconsin Highway Commission. Caldwell also served as Waukesha County surveyor and county engineer. He also worked for the Waukesha, Wisconsin public works department. In 1933, Caldwell served in the Wisconsin State Assembly and was a Democrat. Caldwell died in a hospital in Madison, Wisconsin from pneumonia as a result of abdominal surgery.
