= Joanne Huelsman =

American politician (born 1938)

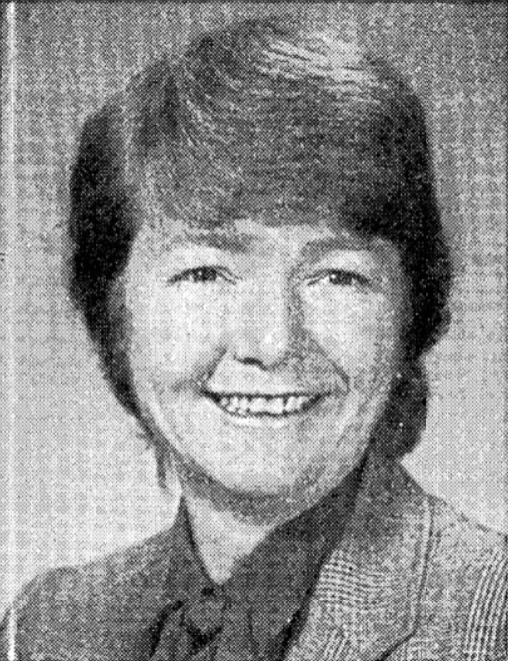

Member of the Wisconsin Senate from the 11th district
- In office January 7, 1991 – January 6, 2003
- Preceded by: J. Mac Davis
- Succeeded by: Neal Kedzie

Member of the Wisconsin State Assembly
- In office January 7, 1985 – January 7, 1991
- Preceded by: Randall J. Radtke
- Succeeded by: Daniel P. Vrakas
- Constituency: 31st district
- In office January 3, 1983 – January 7, 1985
- Preceded by: Eugene Dorff
- Succeeded by: John Antaramian
- Constituency: 65th district

Personal details
- Born: March 21, 1938 (age 88) Harvey, Illinois, U.S.
- Party: Republican
- Spouse: Albert "Bill" Huelsman
- Children: 2
- Education: University of Wisconsin–Madison; Marquette University Law School
- Profession: Lawyer, realtor

Joanne B. Huelsman (born March 21, 1938) is a retired American lawyer, realtor, and Republican politician from Waukesha, Wisconsin. She represented the Waukesha area for 12 years in the Wisconsin Senate (1991–2003) and eight years in the Wisconsin State Assembly (1983–1991).

== Biography ==
Born in Harvey, Illinois, Huelsman received her bachelor's degree from University of Wisconsin–Madison and her law degree from Marquette University Law School. Huelsman practiced law, was in the real estate business, and owned a small business. She served on the Waukesha, Wisconsin Board of Education and the Waukesha County Board of Supervisors. Huelsman was elected to the Senate in 1990 and was re-elected in 1994 and 1998. Previously, she was elected to the Assembly in 1988. She is a Republican.

Wisconsin State Assembly
Preceded by Eugene Dorff	Member of the Wisconsin State Assembly from the 65th district January 3, 1983 – January 7, 1985	Succeeded by John Antaramian
Preceded by Randall J. Radtke	Member of the Wisconsin State Assembly from the 31st district January 7, 1985 – January 7, 1991	Succeeded by Daniel P. Vrakas
Wisconsin Senate
Preceded by J. Mac Davis	Member of the Wisconsin Senate from the 11th district January 7, 1991 – January 6, 2003	Succeeded by Neal Kedzie
