= Lisa Neubauer =

American judge

Chief Judge of the Wisconsin Court of Appeals
- In office August 2, 2015 – July 31, 2021
- Preceded by: Richard S. Brown
- Succeeded by: William W. Brash III

Judge of the Wisconsin Court of Appeals for the 2nd district
- In office January 7, 2008 – August 1, 2026
- Appointed by: Jim Doyle
- Preceded by: Neal Nettesheim
- Succeeded by: Anthony LoCoco

Personal details
- Born: Lisa Stephens; July 21, 1957 (age 69)
- Spouse: Jeffrey A. Neubauer
- Children: 3, including Greta Neubauer
- Education: University of Wisconsin-Madison (BS); University of Chicago (JD)
- Website: Wisconsin courts bio

Lisa Neubauer (née Stephens; born July 21, 1957) is an American lawyer and former judge from Racine, Wisconsin. She served as a judge of the Wisconsin Court of Appeals from 2007 to 2026, in the Waukesha-based 2nd district court. She served as chief judge of the Wisconsin Court of Appeals from 2015 through 2021. She was an unsuccessful candidate for Wisconsin Supreme Court in the 2019 election.

Her husband, Jeffrey A. Neubauer, is a former chairman of the Democratic Party of Wisconsin, and former member of the Wisconsin State Assembly. Their daughter, Greta Neubauer, is a current member of the Wisconsin State Assembly, and the Democratic minority leader.

== Early life and education ==
Neubauer graduated from the University of Wisconsin in 1979. Prior to attending law school, she worked as an aide to state senator Fred Risser of Madison. In 1987, Neubauer graduated from the University of Chicago Law School where she was a member of the Order of the Coif. Following her graduation from law school, she was a law clerk to Judge Barbara Brandriff Crabb of the United States District Court for the Western District of Wisconsin.

=== Community involvement ===
Neubauer is a recipient of the Community Service Award from the Association for Women Lawyers. She is a former board member of the Wisconsin Equal Justice Fund, Racine Area United Way, the Equal Justice Coalition, and Legal Action of Wisconsin. She has been a reading tutor in the Racine public elementary schools through the United Way Schools of Hope program, a big sister with a Big Sisters of Greater Racine, and a mentor for breast cancer survivors through "After Breast Cancer Diagnosis" (ABCD).

Neubauer is on the Supreme Court Finance Committee and is co-chair of the Wisconsin Bar Association’s Bench and Bar Committee and Chair of the Bench/Bar Court Funding Subcommittee. She previously served on the Planning and Policy Advisory Committee, the Judicial Conduct Advisory Committee, and the Wisconsin Supreme Court Committee on Community Outreach.

== Legal career ==
Neubauer was employed from 1988 until 2007 at the Milwaukee law firm Foley and Lardner, specializing in environmental cleanup litigation and rising to the level of partner. While at the firm, she chaired the Insurance Dispute Resolution Practice Group and co-chaired the firm's national recruiting committee.

In December 2007, Democratic governor Jim Doyle appointed Neubauer to a seat on the Wisconsin Court of Appeals vacated by retired Judge Neal Nettesheim. Neubauer was the first woman to serve as a judge of the court's District II, headquartered in Waukesha. Neubauer was elected to a full term on the court in the April 2008 general election, defeating attorney William C. Gleisner III. She enjoyed bi-partisan support in her campaign for the position, including the endorsement of Michael Grebe, the former state chair of the Republican Party of Wisconsin. In 2009, Neubauer was appointed presiding judge of District II.

On May 8, 2015, the Wisconsin Supreme Court appointed Neubauer chief judge of the Court of Appeals. Neubauer took office on August 2, replacing retiring Chief Judge Richard S. Brown.

Neubauer was a candidate for Wisconsin Supreme Court in 2019. Despite endorsements from 150 current and former Wisconsin judges, including 18 from the court of appeals, she was narrowly defeated by Judge Brian Hagedorn.

Neubauer was re-elected to another term on the Court of Appeals in 2020. On June 28, 2021, the Wisconsin Supreme Court issued an order ending her term as chief judge on July 31, 2021; she was replaced by presiding judge William W. Brash III.

In October 2025, Neubauer announced that she would not run for a fourth term on the Court of Appeals in the 2026 election.

== Personal life ==
Lisa Stephens took the last name Neubauer in 1986 when she married Jeffrey A. Neubauer, who was then serving as a state representative and would later serve four years as chairman of the Democratic Party of Wisconsin. They have three adult children, including Greta Neubauer, the current Democratic minority leader in the Wisconsin State Assembly. The Neubauers reside in Racine, Wisconsin.

== Electoral history ==
=== Wisconsin Court of Appeals (2008, 2014, 2020) ===
Wisconsin Court of Appeals District II Election, 2008
Party	Candidate	Votes	%	±%
General Election, April 1, 2008
Nonpartisan	Lisa S. Neubauer (incumbent)	138,241	62.60%	
Nonpartisan	William C. Gleisner III	82,302	37.27%	
	Scattering	286	0.13%	
Plurality		55,939	25.36%	
Total votes		220,543	100.0%	

Wisconsin Court of Appeals District II Election, 2014
Party	Candidate	Votes	%	±%
General Election, April 1, 2014
Nonpartisan	Lisa S. Neubauer (incumbent)	115,521	99.49%	
	Scattering	594	0.51%	
Total votes		116,115	100.0%	

Wisconsin Court of Appeals District II Election, 2020
Party	Candidate	Votes	%	±%
General Election, April 7, 2020
Nonpartisan	Lisa S. Neubauer (incumbent)	231,788	53.99%	
Nonpartisan	Paul Bugenhagen, Jr.	196,958	45.88%	
	Scattering	540	0.13%	
Plurality		34,830	8.11%	
Total votes		429,286	100.0%	

=== Wisconsin Supreme Court (2019) ===
Wisconsin Supreme Court Election, 2019
Party	Candidate	Votes	%	±%
General Election, April 2, 2019
Nonpartisan	Brian Hagedorn	606,414	50.22%	
Nonpartisan	Lisa Neubauer	600,433	49.72%	
	Scattering	722	0.06%	
Plurality		5,981	0.50%	
Total votes		1,207,569	100.0%	+21.06%

Legal offices
Preceded by Neal Nettesheim	Judge of the Wisconsin Court of Appeals District II; 2007–2026	Succeeded by Anthony LoCoco
Preceded by Richard S. Brown	Chief Judge of the Wisconsin Court of Appeals; August 2, 2015–July 31, 2021	Succeeded by William W. Brash III
