= Greta Neubauer =

21st century American politician (born 1991)

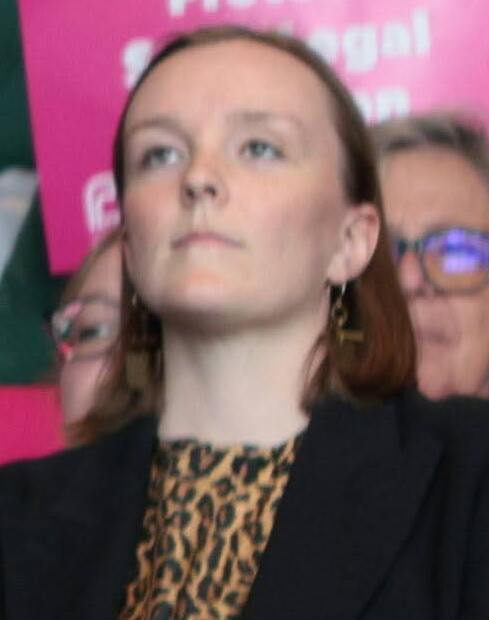

Speaker-designee of the Wisconsin State Assembly
- Assuming office January 4, 2027
- Succeeding: Robin Vos

Minority Leader of the Wisconsin State Assembly
- Incumbent
- Assumed office January 10, 2022
- Preceded by: Gordon Hintz

Member of the Wisconsin State Assembly from the 66th district
- Incumbent
- Assumed office January 27, 2018
- Preceded by: Cory Mason

Personal details
- Born: Gretchen Stephens Neubauer; September 13, 1991 (age 35) Racine, Wisconsin, U.S.
- Party: Democratic
- Spouse: Hudson Cavanagh (m. 2025)
- Children: 1
- Relatives: Jeffrey A. Neubauer (father); Lisa Neubauer (mother)
- Education: Middlebury College (BA)
- Website: State Assembly website

Gretchen Stephens "Greta" Neubauer (/ˈnuːbaʊər/ NOO-bow-ər; born September 13, 1991) is an American Democratic politician from Racine, Wisconsin. She is the minority leader in the Wisconsin State Assembly, since January 2022, and has been a member of the Assembly since 2018, representing Wisconsin's 66th Assembly district. With the incoming Democratic majority for the 108th Wisconsin Legislature, Neubauer has been elected by her caucus to serve as the 80th speaker of the Wisconsin State Assembly; she will be the first woman to hold that office.

Neubauer's mother, Lisa Neubauer, is a former judge of the Wisconsin Court of Appeals. Her father, Jeffrey A. Neubauer, is a former chairman of the Democratic Party of Wisconsin, and former member of the Wisconsin State Assembly.

== Early life and education ==
Greta Neubauer was born and raised in Racine, Wisconsin. She attended high school at The Prairie School in neighboring Wind Point, Wisconsin, graduating in 2010. As a student, she helped organize Racine High School Students for Barack Obama during the 2008 presidential campaign. After graduating from Middlebury College in Vermont with a degree in history, Neubauer became director of the nonprofit Fossil Fuel Divestment Student Network (now the Sunrise Movement), focusing on environmental issues.

== Political career ==
In her first election, in December 2017, Neubauer pointed to the election of Donald Trump as a catalyst for her to turn back toward electoral politics to advocate for a progressive alternative. In August 2017, Neubauer began working as a legislative aide in the office of then-state representative Cory Mason. Neubauer had previously worked as an intern for Mason and considered him a mentor. During her time with Mason, Neubauer worked closely with him on the state budget and had a front row seat to the debate on the $2.85 billion incentive package to bring Foxconn to Racine County.

In November 2017, Mason won a special election to become mayor of Racine and announced he would resign his seat in the Wisconsin State Assembly. Neubauer quickly declared her candidacy to succeed him as representative of the 66th Assembly district. She faced a contested primary for the Democratic Party nomination against first-term Racine alderman John Tate II. The recently approved Foxconn project was highlighted by both candidates, each promising to work to bring more benefits of the project to the residents of the city; Neubauer notably broke with her former boss, Mason, over his vote in favor of the plan. Neubauer prevailed in the December 2017 primary, receiving 53.8% of the vote. She was unopposed in the January special election and took her oath of office on January 27, 2018; her oath was administered by Wisconsin Supreme Court justice Shirley Abrahamson in a public ceremony at the Racine Public Library.

Days before Neubauer's swearing-in, her portrait appeared in a collage on the cover of the January 29 issue of TIME magazine. The story highlighted the surge in first-time female candidates running for office following the 2016 presidential election. That fall, she won re-election to a full term without opposition.

Neubauer quickly rose within the ranks of the Democratic caucus. She was appointed to the Governor's Task Force on Climate Change by new governor Tony Evers in the fall of 2019. After winning her second full term in 2020, she was appointed to a coveted seat on the budget-writing Joint Finance Committee. This was also a particularly important time for the work of that committee as the state experienced an influx of federal money from the American Rescue Plan Act of 2021.

=== Minority leader ===
In December 2021, Democratic Assembly minority leader Gordon Hintz announced he would step down from party leadership. Shortly after the announcement, Neubauer began to consider a run for the leadership post, texting a journalist: "I'm seriously considering a run for minority leader." She formally declared for the position on December 15, 2021; she faced no opposition from within the caucus and was elected Hintz's successor on December 20. At age 30, Neubauer was the youngest caucus leader in the state since a 29-year-old John W. Byrnes served as Senate minority leader in the 1943 term. Neubauer was joined in leadership by new assistant minority leader Kalan Haywood—then 22 years old—making them the youngest legislative leadership team in Wisconsin history.

Neubauer's leadership and management skills were significantly tested in the 2023–2024 term. Democrats in Wisconsin had been held to a minority of seats in the Assembly and state Senate since the passage of gerrymandered legislative maps in 2011, but usually had a comfortable margin to protect vetoes issued by Democratic governor Tony Evers. That changed after the 2022 redistricting—carried out by the Wisconsin Supreme Court—which implemented an even more severe gerrymander. Following the 2022 election, Republicans gained a supermajority in the Wisconsin Senate and came within two seats of a supermajority in the Assembly, creating the real risk that the legislature could enact policy by overriding the governor's veto. As minority leader in the Assembly, Neubauer made it a priority to protect the governor's vetoes—that meant holding her caucus united against all veto override votes; it also meant carefully coordinating schedules and absences to avoid a surprise veto override when Democratic members were unavailable for floor votes. The Assembly minority successfully protected Evers's vetoes for the entire regular legislative session, but they remain on alert for the possibility that an extraordinary session could be called in the waning months of the term.

In 2023, a new majority on the Wisconsin Supreme Court struck down the legislative gerrymander and a new map was adopted in 2024. Neubauer's district was significantly reconfigured. Prior to this redistricting, most of the city of Racine was packed into the 66th district, making the district overwhelmingly Democratic. Under the new plan, Racine was divided between the 62nd district in the north and the 66th district in the south, creating two competitive but Democratic-leaning districts. The new 66th Assembly district also contains the suburban village of Mount Pleasant and the neighboring village of Sturtevant.

Neubauer faced a serious general election challenge in 2024 from Mount Pleasant village president David DeGroot, who had been one of the leading proponents of the Foxconn in Wisconsin project. Neubauer prevailed with 53%, finishing about 2,300 votes ahead of DeGroot. In the 2026 elections, Wisconsin Democrats won the Assembly majority for the first time since 2010, and Neubauer easily defeated opponent Gina Paulick. Neubauer is widely expected to become the first female speaker of the Wisconsin State Assembly at the start of the 108th Wisconsin Legislature.

Through 2025 and 2026, as leader of the Assembly Democratic Campaign Committee, Neubauer engaged in an extensive effort to recruit and prepare Assembly candidates for the 2026 Wisconsin State Assembly election. The 2026 elections were a historic wave for Democrats, and Wisconsin Democrats gained control of both chambers of the Wisconsin Legislature, for the first time since 2010. A week after the election, the members-elect of the Democratic caucus unanimously elected Neubauer to serve as speaker of the Wisconsin State Assembly in the 108th Wisconsin Legislature. Neubauer will be the first woman to hold that office.

== Personal life ==
Greta Neubauer is the second-born of three children of Jeff and Lisa (née Stephens) Neubauer. Jeff is a prominent businessman in Racine, a former member of the State Assembly, and former chairman of the Democratic Party of Wisconsin. Lisa is a judge of the Wisconsin Court of Appeals. Greta Neubauer describes herself as a fifth-generation Racinian.

In a Racine Journal Times op-ed on June 27, 2020, Neubauer came out as queer. On October 23, 2023, Neubauer posted on Facebook and other social media accounts that she was engaged to Hudson Cavanagh. They married in 2025 and had their first child in 2026.

== Electoral history ==
=== Wisconsin Assembly (2018–present) ===
Year	Election	Date	Elected				Defeated				Total	Plurality
2018 (special)	Special; Primary	Dec. 19 (2017)	Greta Neubauer	Democratic	1,518	53.81%	John Tate II	Dem.	1,301	46.12%	2,826	217
2018 (special)	Special	Jan. 16	Greta Neubauer	Democratic	831	100.0%	--Unopposed--				831	831
2018	General	Nov. 6	Greta Neubauer (inc)	Democratic	14,450	97.01%	--Unopposed--				14,896	14,004
2020	General	Nov. 3	Greta Neubauer (inc)	Democratic	14,522	70.17%	Will Leverson	Rep.	6,131	29.63%	20,694	8,391
2022	General	Nov. 8	Greta Neubauer (inc)	Democratic	11,261	76.27%	Carl Hutton	Rep.	3,338	22.61%	14,765	7,923
2024	General	Nov. 5	Greta Neubauer (inc)	Democratic	15,769	53.89%	David DeGroot	Rep.	13,426	45.89%	29,262	2,343

Wisconsin State Assembly
Preceded by Gordon Hintz	Minority Leader of the Wisconsin State Assembly; 2022–present	Incumbent
