= J. Mac Davis =

Retired American judge (born 1952)

The Honorable J. Mac Davis

Chief Judge of the 3rd District of Wisconsin Circuit Courts
- In office August 1, 2007 – July 31, 2013
- Preceded by: Kathryn W. Foster
- Succeeded by: Randy R. Koschnick

Wisconsin Circuit Court Judge for the Waukesha Circuit, Branch 7
- In office August 1, 1997 – July 31, 2015
- Preceded by: Clair H. Voss
- Succeeded by: Maria S. Lazar

Wisconsin Circuit Court Judge for the Waukesha Circuit, Branch 6
- In office August 1, 1990 – July 31, 1996
- Preceded by: Robert T. McGraw
- Succeeded by: Patrick C. Haughney

Member of the Wisconsin Senate from the 11th district
- In office January 3, 1983 – August 1, 1990
- Preceded by: Warren D. Braun
- Succeeded by: Joanne B. Huelsman

Personal details
- Born: April 5, 1952 (age 74)
- Party: Republican
- Children: 3
- Parent: Glenn Robert Davis
- Education: University of Wisconsin–Madison (B.A.); University of Michigan (J.D.)

J. Mac Davis (born April 5, 1952) is an American lawyer, politician, and retired judge. He served as a commissioner on the Wisconsin Ethics Commission, appointed to a five-year term in 2016. He was a Wisconsin Circuit Court judge in Waukesha County for 24 years, retiring in 2015. Earlier in his career he represented Waukesha County in the Wisconsin State Senate as a Republican.

== Biography ==
Davis graduated from University of Wisconsin–Madison in 1973, with honors, in economics. He then received his J.D. degree, cum laude, from University of Michigan Law School. Davis was admitted to the bar in Wisconsin in 1976.

Davis was elected to the Wisconsin State Senate in 1982, as a Republican, and was re-elected in 1986. In the senate, he served as ranking senate minority member on the Joint Finance Committee.

In 1990, Davis was elected a Wisconsin Circuit Court judge for Waukesha County. He did not seek re-election in 1996, but unsuccessfully ran for congress. He was elected judge again in 1997, and re-elected in 2003 and 2009. He served as chief judge of the 3rd Judicial District, by appointment of the Wisconsin Supreme Court, from 2007 to 2013. He retired from his judgeship on July 31, 2015.

In September 2008, Judge Davis was nominated by U.S. President George W. Bush to the United States District Court for the Western District of Wisconsin, to replace Judge John C. Shabaz, who had stated his intention to retire. The United States Senate did not take up his confirmation and the nomination expired four months later at the end of Bush's presidency.

He was appointed by Governor Scott Walker to the newly created Wisconsin Ethics Commission, to a five-year term commencing July 1, 2016.

Wisconsin Senate
Preceded by Warren D. Braun	Member of the Wisconsin Senate from the 11th district 1983 – 1990	Succeeded by Joanne B. Huelsman
Legal offices
Preceded by Robert T. McGraw	Wisconsin Circuit Court Judge for the Waukesha Circuit, Branch 6; 1990 – 1996	Succeeded by Patrick C. Haughney
Preceded by Clair H. Voss	Wisconsin Circuit Court Judge for the Waukesha Circuit, Branch 7; 1997 – 2015	Succeeded by Maria S. Lazar
Preceded by Kathryn W. Foster	Chief Judge of the 3rd District of Wisconsin Circuit Courts; 2007 – 2013	Succeeded by Randy R. Koschnick
