= List of mayors of Waukesha, Wisconsin =

The following is a list of mayors of the city of Waukesha, Wisconsin, USA.

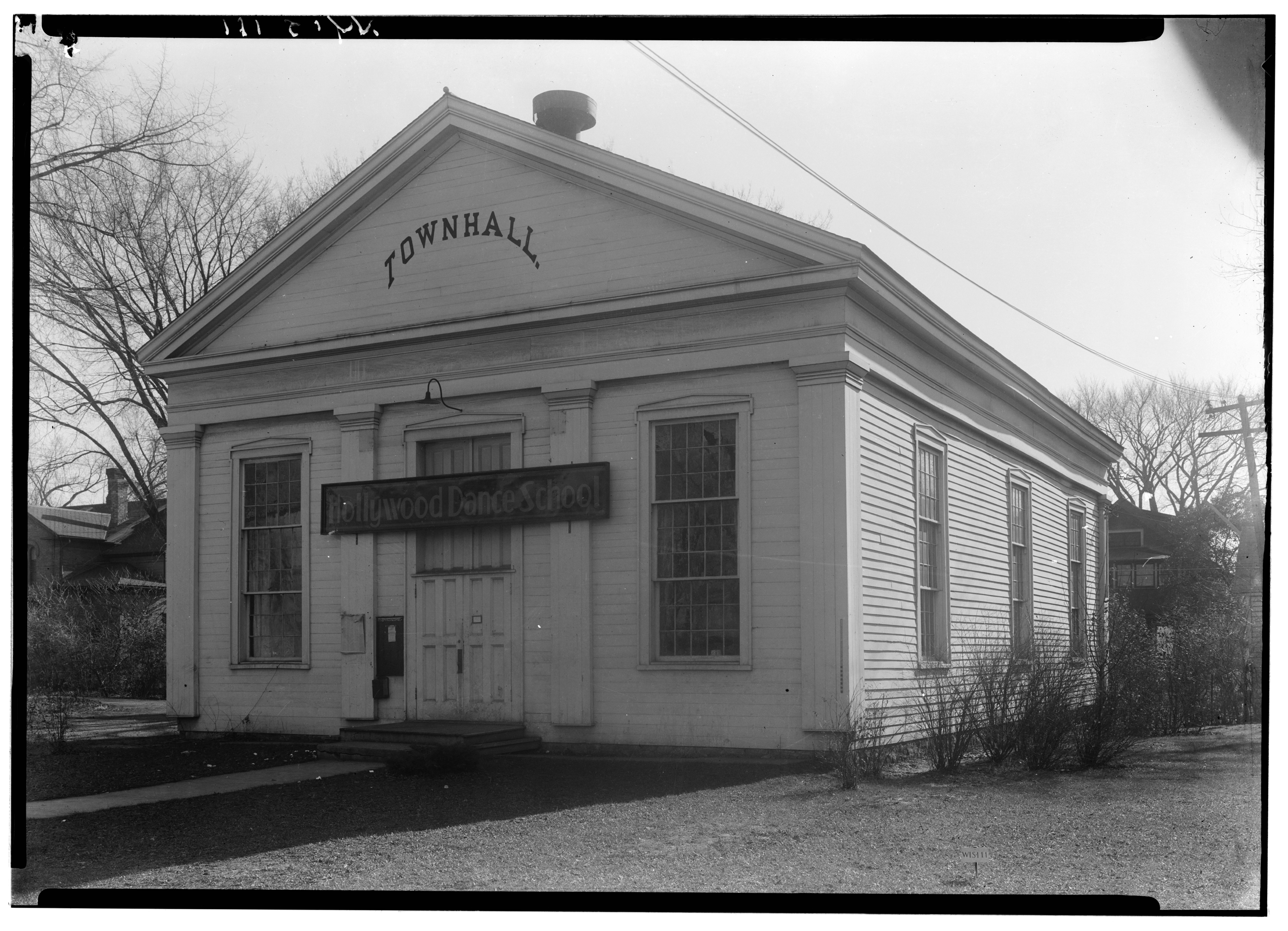
Waukesha Town Hall building, circa mid-20th century

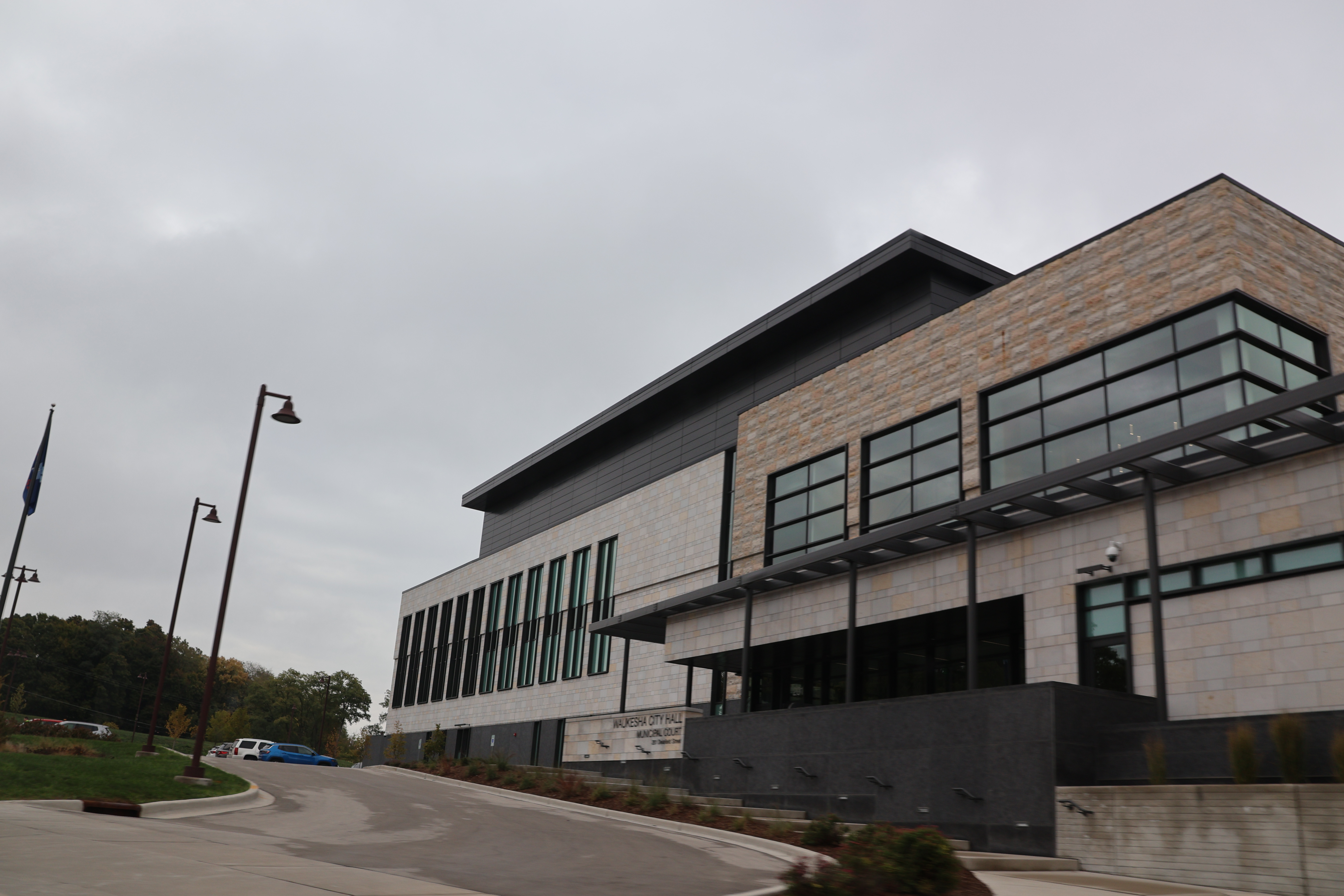
Waukesha City Hall building in 2023

- John Brehm, 1896
- Foster C. Phelps, 1896-1897
- Herbert M. Enos, 1897-1898
- Allen F. Warden, 1898-1900
- Richard L. Gove, 1900-1902
- George Harding, 1902-1904
- Matthias L. Snyder, 1904-1908
- Michael W. Glenn, 1908-1910
- George S. Love, 1910-1912
- Hawley W. Wilbur, 1912-1914
- Arthur J. Dopp, 1914-1915
- Edward R. Estberg, 1915-1920
- Philip Kiehl, 1920-1922
- Henry E. Blair, 1922-1926
- Morgan R. Butler, 1926-1934
- George W. Coutts, 1934–1938, 1940-1946
- Henry Snyder, 1938-1940
- Edwin H. Honeyager, 1946-1950
- Bruce F. Beaty, 1950-1952
- Corwin C. Smith, 1952-1956
- Paul C. Steinert, 1956-1960
- Harold T. Owens, 1961–1966, 1968-1970
- Francis R. Eshman, 1966-1967
- Paul G. Vrakas, 1970–1978, 1986-1994
- Joseph C. La Porte, 1978-1982
- Paul J. Keenan, 1982-1986
- Carol A. Opel, 1994-1998
- Carol J. Lombardi, 1998-2006
- Larry Nelson, 2006-2010
- Jeff Scrima, 2010-2014
- Shawn N. Reilly, 2014–2026
- Alicia Halvensleben, 2026-present

== See also ==
- Waukesha history
