= Warren Braun =

20th century American politician

Member of the Wisconsin Senate from the 11th district
- In office December 8, 1976 – January 3, 1983
- Preceded by: Wayne F. Whittow
- Succeeded by: J. Mac Davis

Personal details
- Born: June 12, 1934 (age 92) Eden, Wisconsin, U.S.
- Party: Democratic
- Spouse: Sharon
- Children: 3
- Education: Marquette University (B.S.); University of Wisconsin–Milwaukee (M.S.)

Military service
- Allegiance: United States
- Branch/service: United States Army; U.S. Army Reserve
- Years of service: 1957–1963

Warren Daniel Braun (born June 12, 1934) is a retired American educator, Catholic deacon, and Democratic politician. He served six years in the Wisconsin State Senate (1977–1983) representing the west side of the city of Milwaukee, and was a member of the Milwaukee Common Council and the Milwaukee School Board.

== Early life and career ==
Braun was born in Eden, in Fond du Lac County, Wisconsin, and graduated from St. Mary Springs High School in Fond du Lac. He attended Marquette University in Milwaukee, where he earned his bachelor's degree in political science in 1956. After earning his degree, Braun became a history teacher and football coach at Milwaukee's Pius XI High School. He also served in the United States Army Reserve from 1957 through 1963. In the late 1960s, Braun continued his own education at the University of Wisconsin–Milwaukee, and earned his master's degree in history in 1970. He subsequently attended Marquette University Law School but did not finish.

== Political career ==
In 1968, Braun ran successfully for a seat on the Milwaukee Common Council from Milwaukee's 16th ward. He was re-elected several times. He was noteworthy on the common council as the first white alderman in Milwaukee to vote in favor of an open housing ordinance for the city.

In 1976, incumbent Wisconsin state senator Wayne F. Whittow, who represented Milwaukee's west side district—then the 11th State Senate district—resigned in the middle of his term after his election as Milwaukee city treasurer. A special election was called for November 1976 to fill the vacancy for the remaining two years of the term, and Braun decided to enter the race. In the November general election, Braun received 80% of the vote in the heavily Democratic district and took the oath of office on December 8, 1976.

He was re-elected in 1978 without opposition. In 1982, the Wisconsin Legislature failed to pass a redistricting act and, as a result, a lawsuit led to redistricting being carried out by a panel of federal judges. Braun's Senate district was dismembered, and he instead chose to enter the Democratic primary for a vacancy in Wisconsin's 5th congressional district. Braun came in 4th in a field of ten candidates in the primary, taking 14% of the vote.

== Later years ==
Following the end of his Senate term, Braun was employed as director of the social ministry department of the Roman Catholic Archdiocese of Milwaukee, and served on several state boards and commissions. Under Governor Tony Earl, he was appointed to the Wisconsin Council on Criminal Justice in 1983, and to a special legislative committee for studying pregnancy options in 1985.

Through his role with the Archdiocese, he remained active in state politics, pushing for progressive reform of the state property tax, and writing to the Governor to request that the Wisconsin National Guard not be utilized in support of the Contras in Nicaragua. He was subsequently elected to the Milwaukee School Board.

== Electoral history ==
=== Wisconsin Senate (1976, 1978) ===
Wisconsin's 5th Congressional District Election, 1976
Party	Candidate	Votes	%	±%
General Election, November 2, 1976
Democratic	Warren D. Braun	34,192	80.29%	
Republican	Branko Terzic	8,396	19.71%	
Plurality		25,796	60.57%	
Total votes		42,588	100.0%	+136.77%
Democratic hold				

=== U.S. House of Representatives (1982) ===
Wisconsin's 5th Congressional District Election, 1982
Party	Candidate	Votes	%	±%
Democratic Primary, September 14, 1982
Democratic	Jim Moody	17,073	18.52%	
Democratic	Frederick P. Kessler	15,804	17.14%	
Democratic	Orville E. Pitts	15,264	16.55%	
Democratic	Warren D. Braun	13,320	14.45%	
Democratic	Marty Aronson	11,799	12.80%	
Democratic	Kevin D. O'Connor	10,368	11.24%	
Democratic	Karen Lamb	3,814	4.14%	
Democratic	Harout O. Sanasarian	2,812	3.05%	
Democratic	Roman R. Blenski	1,409	1.53%	
Democratic	John Werner	539	0.58%	
Plurality		1,269	1.38%	
Total votes		92,202	100.0%	
