= Lyle E. Douglass =

American politician (1888–1943)

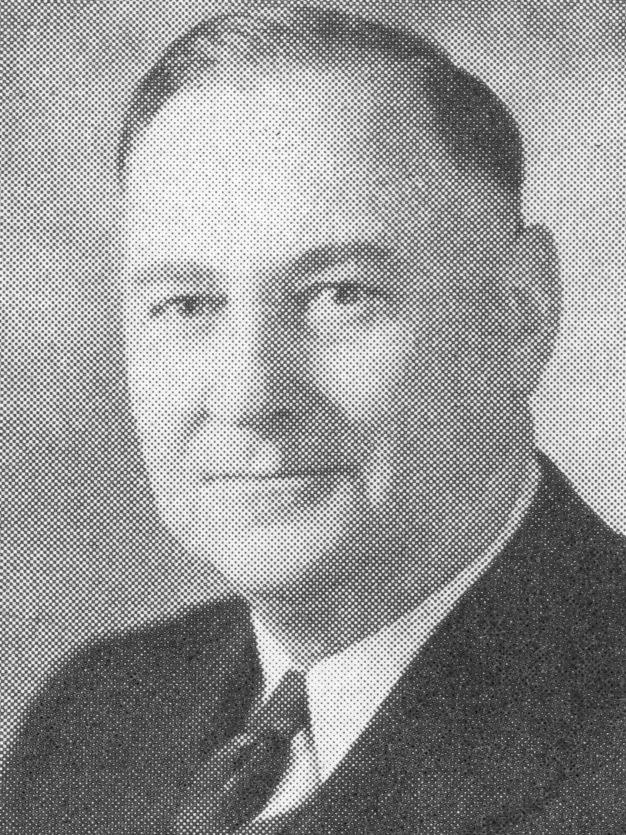
- Douglass circa 1940

Member of the Wisconsin State Assembly from the Waukesha 1 district
- In office 1935 – January 6, 1941
- Preceded by: Walter G. Caldwell
- Succeeded by: Glenn Robert Davis

Personal details
- Born: March 10, 1888 Chicago, Illinois, US
- Died: December 23, 1943 (aged 55)
- Party: Republican
- Spouse: Olive F Douglas
- Education: Carroll University

Lyle Ellsworth Douglass (March 10, 1888 in Chicago, Illinois – December 23, 1943) was a member of the Wisconsin State Assembly.

== Biography ==
Douglass was born in March 1888. He graduated from what is now known as Carroll University and served in the United States Army during World War I.

== Political career ==
Douglass was a member of the Assembly during the 1935, 1937 and 1939 sessions. He was a Republican.
