= Alicia Halvensleben =

American politician

35th Mayor of Waukesha, Wisconsin
- Incumbent
- Assumed office April 21, 2026
- Preceded by: Shawn Reilly

President of the Common Council of Waukesha, Wisconsin
- In office April 2024 – April 21, 2026
- Succeeded by: Dan Manion

Member of the Common Council of Waukesha, Wisconsin, from the 11th district
- In office April 2022 – April 21, 2026
- Preceded by: Leonard Miller
- Succeeded by: Vacant

Personal details
- Party: Democratic
- Education: Beloit College
- Website: Official website Campaign website

Alicia Halvensleben is an American salesperson and Democratic politician from Waukesha, Wisconsin. She is the 35th and current mayor of Waukesha, since winning election in April 2026. She previously served four years on the Waukesha Common Council, and was president of the council from 2024 until her election as mayor.

== Biography ==
Halvensleben was raised in Evansville, Wisconsin, and later moved to Milwaukee. Later, she attended Beloit College and moved to Waukesha, Wisconsin.

Following the election of Donald Trump in 2016, Halvensleben began getting involved with local Democrats in Waukesha.

In 2022, Halvensleben ran for the Waukesha Common Council, challenging incumbent Leonard Miller. She and another candidate defeated Miller in the primary. In the general election, Halvensleben garnered 54% of the vote. In April 2024, she was elected Common Council President. She was re-elected to a second term in 2025.

In October 2025, Halvensleben announced she would run for mayor of Waukesha in the 2026 election. She faced Republican state representative Scott Allen, and was endorsed by out-going mayor Shawn Reilly and former mayor Larry Nelson. She centered her campaign around balancing the city budget and appealing to developers to develop unused city land. Additionally, Halvensleben ran on increasing government transparency.

Halvensleben's candidacy was described as a longshot, with the potential for her victory being described as an upset. In the general election, Halvensleben defeated Allen by three points. She became the second Democrat to serve as mayor of the city, following Larry Nelson, who served from 2006 until 2010.

== See also ==
- List of mayors of Waukesha, Wisconsin
