= R. Michael Ferrall =

American politician (born 1936)

R. Michael Ferrall (born October 3, 1936) is a former member of the Wisconsin State Assembly.

== Biography ==
Ferrall was born in Minneapolis, Minnesota. He graduated from high school in Gresham, Wisconsin before receiving a B.S. degree from the University of Wisconsin–Stevens Point in 1962 and a M.S. from the University of Wisconsin–Milwaukee in 1967. From 1954 to 1957, Ferrall served in the United States Navy. He has five children.

== Political career ==
Ferrall was first elected to the Assembly in 1970. He is a Democrat.

In two successive legislative sessions, Ferrall championed the "Ferrall bill" to establish a right to privacy in Wisconsin for the first time, making an invasion of the right to privacy and false light as causes of action under state law. In 1975, the Assembly passed the bill but the Senate failed to act on it. In 1977, the bill passed committee and was sent to the Assembly floor, but was delayed on a close vote; critics were concerned about a proliferation of lawsuits and media outlets were concerned about freedom of the press issues.

In 1978, Ferrall became embroiled in a controversy over a $30 legislative per diem allowance he received while maintaining a house in Dane County, where the capital of Madison is situated. State law provided that legislators who maintained "primary residence" in Dane County were entitled only to half the maximum $30 per diem allowance. Ferrall was eventually cleared of wrongdoing in a report by Legislative Counsel staff attorneys.

In April 1979, Ferrall and fellow representative John Shabaz were arrested in separate incidents on charges of driving under the influence. Ferrall decided not to fight the charge.

Ferrall did not seek renomination to the Assembly in 1980.

Ferrall's 1970-1980 papers are held by the University of Wisconsin–Madison library.
