= Shawn Reilly (politician) =

American politician

34th Mayor of Waukesha, Wisconsin
- In office April 15, 2014 – April 21, 2026
- Preceded by: Jeff Scrima
- Succeeded by: Alicia Halvensleben

Personal details
- Born: Shawn N. Reilly
- Party: Independent (2021–present)
- Other political affiliations: Republican (until 2021)
- Relations: Paul F. Reilly (brother)
- Children: 2
- Education: University of Wisconsin–Madison; Lewis & Clark Law School

Shawn N. Reilly is an American lawyer and politician serving as the mayor of Waukesha, Wisconsin since 2014. Originally a Republican, Reilly became an independent in 2021 following the January 6 United States Capitol attack and endorsed the Kamala Harris 2024 presidential campaign, citing concerns about Donald Trump's influence on democracy.

== Early life and education ==
Shawn N. Reilly is the third oldest of nine children, born into a large family with roots in Waukesha, Wisconsin. His father, Bill Reilly, was an attorney, and his brother Paul F. Reilly became a judge.

Reilly attended the University of Wisconsin–Madison, where he earned a degree in political science along with a certificate in environmental studies. Initially interested in energy policy analysis, his career path shifted due to limited job opportunities in the early 1980s recession. Reilly worked in construction for two years in California before applying to law school. He was accepted to Lewis & Clark Law School, where he earned a J.D. in 1989.

== Career ==
Reilly returned to Waukesha to practice law, gaining experience in municipal law. In April 2014, Reilly began serving as the mayor of Waukesha. He was elected in a nonpartisan mayoral race, defeating the incumbent mayor, Jeff Scrima by over 2,000 votes. Reilly ran on a platform of "no drama," presenting himself as a low-key, collaborative leader who sought to work with the city council and local stakeholders to address issues facing the community. Prior to this election, he identified as a Republican, though the position of mayor is officially nonpartisan.

Reilly continued to serve as the mayor of Waukesha through several re-election campaigns, including in 2022 where he secured 63.9% of the vote. One of Reilly's primary focuses has been addressing Waukesha's water supply issues. The city has long faced challenges related to contamination in its aquifer, and Reilly has been an advocate for the Great Water Alliance project, Waukesha's application to tap into Lake Michigan for water, while ensuring that the city returns an equal amount to the lake. He also prioritizes affordable housing.

His political stance underwent a significant change following the January 6 United States Capitol attack. In January 2021, Reilly became an independent and publicly disavowed the Republican Party, stating he was "ashamed" of his past affiliation with the GOP and could no longer align with it. This shift reflected growing dissatisfaction with party leadership, especially around public safety measures and the handling of the COVID-19 pandemic. In October 2024, Reilly made national headlines when he endorsed the Kamala Harris 2024 presidential campaign. This endorsement was significant as it marked the first time Reilly supported a Democratic candidate. He cited concerns about Donald Trump's potential return to the presidency, expressing fears about authoritarianism and the threat Trump posed to American democracy and the U.S. Constitution. Reilly's endorsement of Harris followed a long-standing opposition to Trump, which began during the 2016 election when he did not vote for either Trump or Democratic candidate Hillary Clinton.

== Personal life ==
Reilly has two children and was divorced as of 2015. Reilly is a competitive barbecuer, participating in events like the Jack Daniel's World Championship Invitational Barbecue in 2013, where his team placed 42nd out of 97 teams.

== See also ==
- List of American politicians who switched parties in office
- List of mayors of Waukesha, Wisconsin
