= Neal Nettesheim =

American lawyer

Neal P. Nettesheim is an American former deputy chief judge and presiding judge of the Wisconsin Court of Appeals.

== Career ==
Nettesheim received his bachelor's degree from Northwestern University. He began practicing law in 1966 after graduating from Marquette University Law School.

His judicial career began in 1975 after he was elected a Waukesha County, Wisconsin judge. Later, he became a Wisconsin Circuit Court judge. He remained on the circuit court, eventually becoming a presiding judge, until his appointment to the Court of Appeals in 1984. During his tenure with the Court of Appeals, he served as a presiding judge twice, from 1990 to 1993, and from 2001 to 2003. He also became deputy chief judge in 1998, and remained in that position until his retirement in 2007. He then served as a reserve judge, and was appointed to preside over the first two Jane Doe investigations with associates of former Governor Scott Walker.

Before taking the bench, he practiced as a private attorney from 1966 to 1975. He was very involved in judicial education. He served as the dean of the Wisconsin Judicial College from 1987 to 1993, and as faculty advisor at the National Judicial College in Reno, Nevada.
