= Waukesha, Wisconsin =

- City
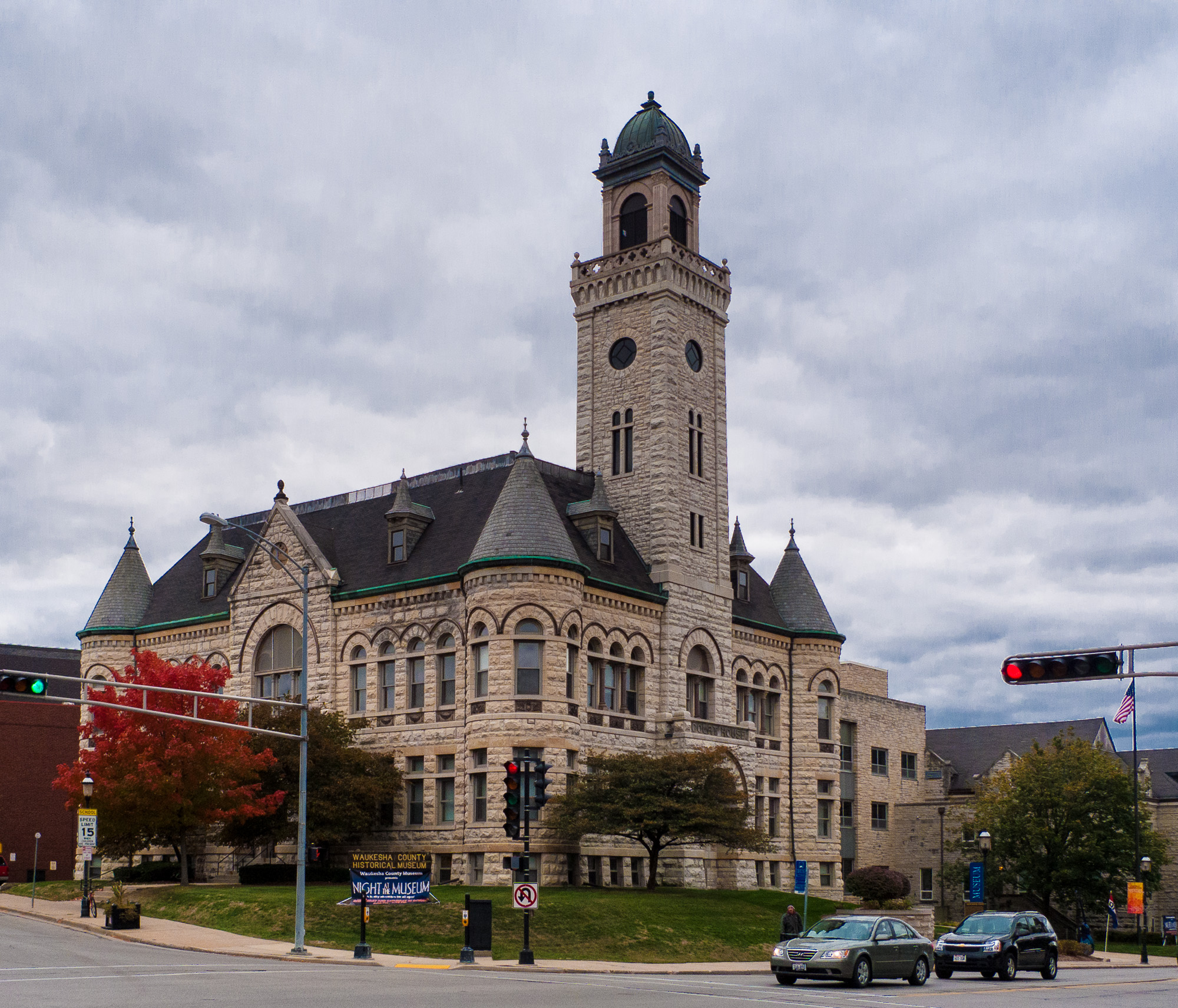
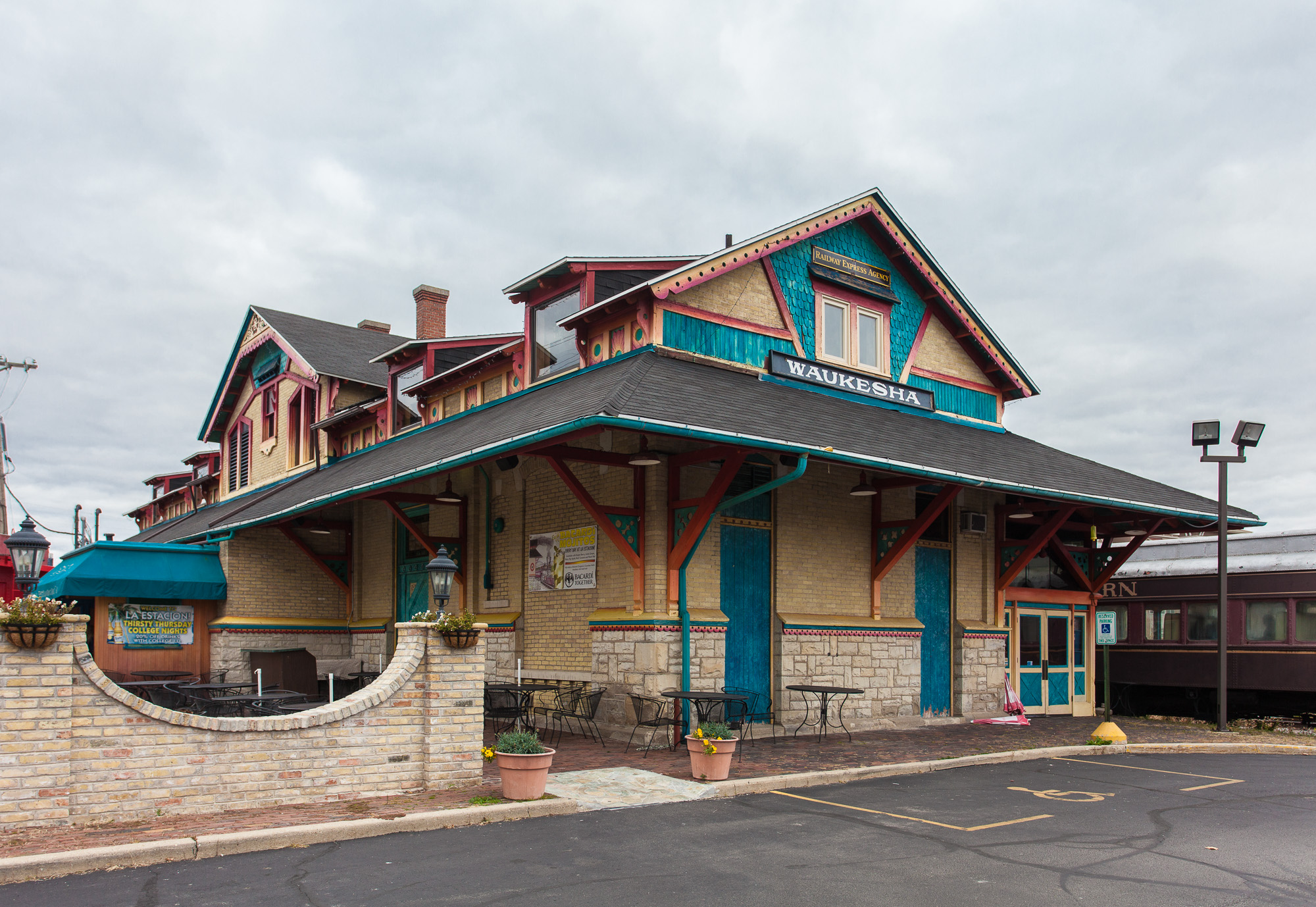
- Old Waukesha County Courthouse Waukesha station Fox River
- Nicknames: Spring City, Saratoga of the West, Guitartown
- Interactive map of Waukesha, Wisconsin
- Location within Wisconsin Location within the United States
- Coordinates: 43°00′42″N 88°13′54″W
- Country: United States
- State: Wisconsin
- County: Waukesha

Government
  - Mayor: Alicia Halvensleben

Area
  - Total: 25.80 sq mi (66.83 km^{2})
  - Land: 25.53 sq mi (66.12 km^{2})
  - Water: 0.27 sq mi (0.70 km^{2}) 1.04%

Population (2020)
  - Total: 71,158
  - Estimate (2024): 71,461
  - Rank: 7th in Wisconsin
  - Density: 2,787/sq mi (1,076/km^{2})
- Time zone: UTC−6 (Central)
  - Summer (DST): UTC−5 (Central)
- ZIP Codes: 53186-53189
- Area code: 262
- FIPS code: 55-84250
- Website: waukesha-wi.gov

Waukesha (/ˈwɔːkɪʃɔː/ WAW-ki-shaw) is a city in and the county seat of Waukesha County, Wisconsin, United States. The population was 71,158 at the 2020 census. Located along the Fox River adjacent to the Village of Waukesha, it is the seventh-most populous city in Wisconsin. Waukesha is also part of the Milwaukee metropolitan area.

== Etymology ==
"Waukesha" is thought to be an Anglicization of the Ojibwe word Waagoshag, the plural of fox (waagosh), or the Potawatomi name Wau-tsha. Wau-tsha (sometimes written as Wauk-tsha or Wauke-tsha) was the leader of the local tribe at the time of the first European settlement of the area. This is confirmed by accounts of Increase A. Lapham, an early settler and historian of the region. According to Lapham, the Algonquian word for "fox" was pishtaka. Cutler also told visitors about Wau-tsha, who was described as "tall and athletic, proud in his bearing, dignified and friendly."

== History ==
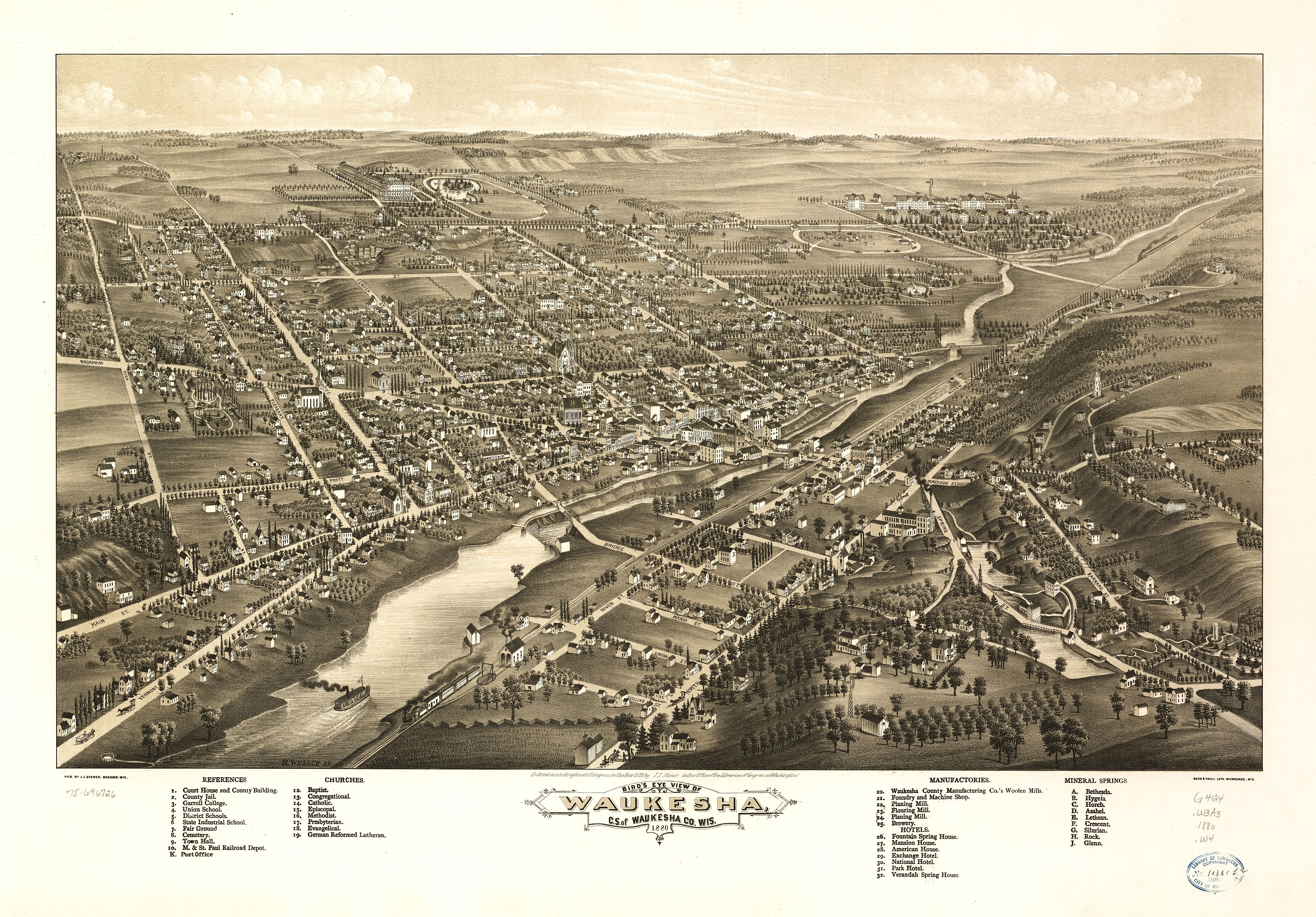
Bird's-eye view of Waukesha, 1880

National Hotel in downtown Waukesha

=== Founding and early history ===
The Waukesha area was first settled by European-Americans in 1834, with Morris D. Cutler as its first settler. The founders of Waukesha were settlers from New England, part of a wave of New England farmers who headed west into what was then the wilds of the Northwest Territory during the early 1800s. Most arrived as a result of the completion of the Erie Canal as well as the end of the Black Hawk War. When the first settlers arrived, there was nothing but dense virgin forest and wild prairie. The settlers laid out farms, constructed roads, erected government buildings and established post routes. They brought many of their Yankee values, such as a passion for education, establishing many schools as well as staunch support for abolitionism. They were mostly members of the Congregationalist Church though some were Episcopalian. Due to the second Great Awakening some had converted to Methodism and others had become Baptists before moving to Waukesha County. Like much of Wisconsin, Waukesha would be culturally very continuous with New England culture for most of its early history.

By 1846, the area was incorporated as the town of Prairie Village (soon changed to Prairieville). On February 8, 1847, the town changed its name to "Waukesha". On January 10, 1852, the settled area once known as Prairieville was separated from the town of Waukesha and incorporated as a village; it incorporated as a city in 1896. The first appointed mayor of the newly incorporated city of Waukesha was John Brehm, who served from January to April 1896. Welsh immigrants settling in Waukesha as early as the 1840s, and large numbers arrived in the late 1800s and early 1900s, when they were one of the largest ethnic groups in Waukesha. In the late 1800s a large number of Belgian families arrived in Waukesha as well. Around the same time there was also relatively large amounts of Serbian immigrants settling in Waukesha, many more of which arrived after the Yugoslav Wars much later in the 1990s.

=== Natural springs ===
Hobo Spring

Matthew Laflin, an early pioneer of Chicago, Illinois, provided the capital and enterprise that laid the foundation for Waukesha as a famous Wisconsin watering resort and was the proprietor of the grand resort, the Fountain Spring House. Waukesha was once known for its extremely clean and good-tasting spring water and was called a "spa town." This earned the city the nicknames "Spring City" and "Saratoga of the West."

According to author Kristine Adams Wendt, in 1868, Colonel Richard Dunbar, a sufferer of diabetes, chanced upon the medicinal properties of what he later named the Bethesda Spring while viewing a parcel of land recently purchased by his sister. Testimonials found in a Dunbar brochure of 1873 proclaimed the miraculous benefits. Wendt reports that by 1872, "area newspapers carried accounts of a community ill equipped to handle its new popularity among the suffering multitudes. The semi-weekly Wisconsin (Milwaukee) of July 31, 1872, reported 'that fully 500 visitors are quartered in hotels and scattered in private families here, seeking benefit from the marvelous waters…'"

The "healing waters" were so valued that a controversial attempt was made to build a pipeline between the city and Chicago so that they could be enjoyed by visitors to the 1893 Columbian Exposition. According to Time magazine, "[t]he scheme had been conceived by one Charles Welsh who had been given the springs by his uncle, but after several miles of pipe were laid, it was discovered that the cost was too great." Richard Warren Sears, founder of Sears and Roebuck, may have been attracted to Waukesha by the waters. In failing health, Sears retired from business in 1908 and, according to The New York Times, "spent his time on his great farm near Waukesha." In 1914, Sears died in Waukesha of Bright's disease, leaving an estate estimated at $20 million.

Over the years, the natural springs have been spoiled by pollution and a number have gone dry. Water drawn from an aquifer reached radium levels exceeding federal standards.

=== 20th century to present ===
One of the most important "firsts" in American sports history occurred in Waukesha on September 5, 1906, when Carroll College (now Carroll University) hosted the football team from St. Louis University. SLU halfback Bradbury Robinson threw the first legal forward pass in football history in that game. The Carroll players and local fans were stunned. The visitors went on to win 22–0.

During the Cold War, Waukesha County was the site of three Nike Missile batteries, located in the city of Waukesha and nearby Muskego and Lannon. In the city of Waukesha, the U.S. Army and later the Wisconsin National Guard operated the command and control center from 1956 to 1970 at what is now Hillcrest Park, on Davidson Road. The missile pits existed near the corner of Cleveland Avenue and Hwy 164—first holding Ajax missiles with conventional warheads and later the nuclear-equipped Hercules warhead. The Hercules provided a similar nuclear capability as that of the atomic bomb dropped on Nagasaki in World War II. The Midwest Chapter of the Cold War Museum has promoted the preservation of the Hillcrest Park site as a local Cold War museum, honoring Cold War veterans and commemorating America's longest and costliest conflict.

In 2013, Waukesha applied for permission to withdraw water from Lake Michigan. Because Waukesha is outside the lake's basin, the 2008 Great Lakes Compact makes the city ineligible to withdraw water from the lake without approval from the governors of Illinois, Indiana, Michigan, Minnesota, New York, Ohio, Pennsylvania, and Wisconsin. In June 2016, the governors approved Waukesha's application. Construction of the supply and return pipelines for the Waukesha water diversion from Lake Michigan was completed in 2024. Typical water bills in the City are projected to increase by approximately 50% between 2023 and 2027, to fund the supply and return pipelines.

On May 31, 2014, two 12-year-old Waukesha girls lured their friend into the woods and stabbed her 19 times. They did this to appease a fictional online character known as Slender Man. The victim survived the attack after being found by a cyclist. The two perpetrators were found not guilty by mental disease or defect, and were sentenced to long periods in mental health institutions.

On November 21, 2021, the driver of a red SUV by the name of Darrell E. Brooks Jr. drove through the Waukesha Christmas Parade during its procession through downtown Waukesha late that afternoon, killing six people and injuring 62 others. He was sentenced to six consecutive life sentences without the possibility of parole, plus an additional 763 years and 3 months to be served consecutively.

== Geography ==
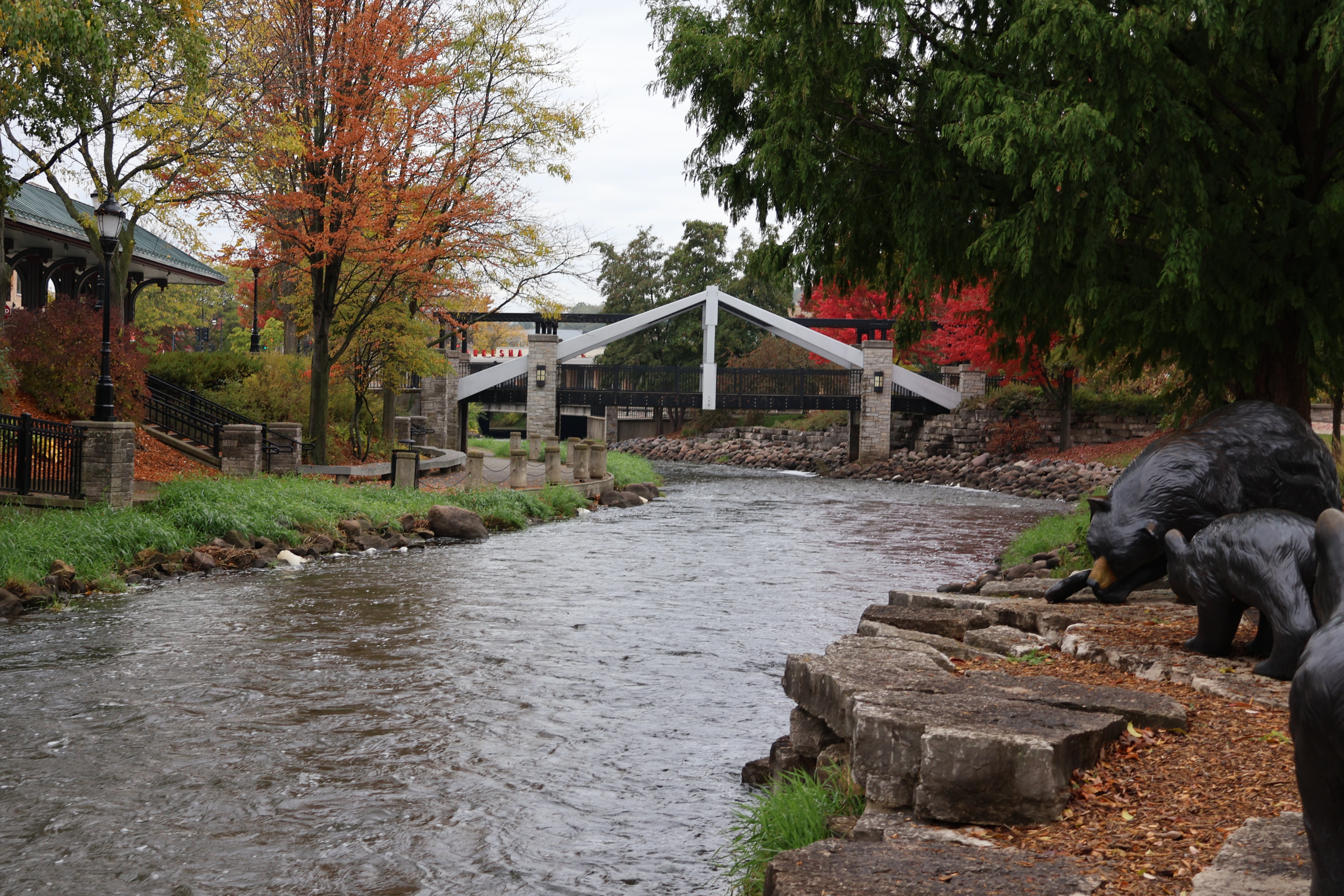
A portion of the Fox River Trail, along the Fox River in Waukesha

According to the United States Census Bureau, the city has a total area of 25.07 square miles (64.93 km^{2}), of which 24.81 square miles (64.26 km^{2}) is land and 0.26 square miles (0.67 km^{2}) is water.

Climate data for Waukesha WWTP, Wisconsin (1991–2020 normals, extremes 1894–present)
Month	Jan	Feb	Mar	Apr	May	Jun	Jul	Aug	Sep	Oct	Nov	Dec	Year
Record high °F (°C)	62 (17)	71 (22)	82 (28)	91 (33)	101 (38)	101 (38)	109 (43)	102 (39)	101 (38)	88 (31)	78 (26)	68 (20)	109 (43)
Mean daily maximum °F (°C)	27.7 (−2.4)	31.5 (−0.3)	43.0 (6.1)	55.3 (12.9)	67.3 (19.6)	77.4 (25.2)	81.4 (27.4)	79.8 (26.6)	72.9 (22.7)	60.0 (15.6)	45.0 (7.2)	33.0 (0.6)	56.2 (13.4)
Daily mean °F (°C)	19.7 (−6.8)	23.0 (−5.0)	33.5 (0.8)	45.1 (7.3)	56.6 (13.7)	66.5 (19.2)	70.9 (21.6)	69.4 (20.8)	62.0 (16.7)	49.9 (9.9)	36.7 (2.6)	25.5 (−3.6)	46.6 (8.1)
Mean daily minimum °F (°C)	11.6 (−11.3)	14.6 (−9.7)	24.0 (−4.4)	34.8 (1.6)	45.8 (7.7)	55.6 (13.1)	60.3 (15.7)	58.9 (14.9)	51.1 (10.6)	39.8 (4.3)	28.3 (−2.1)	18.1 (−7.7)	36.9 (2.7)
Record low °F (°C)	−27 (−33)	−28 (−33)	−14 (−26)	7 (−14)	25 (−4)	29 (−2)	41 (5)	35 (2)	25 (−4)	7 (−14)	−9 (−23)	−28 (−33)	−28 (−33)
Average precipitation inches (mm)	1.60 (41)	1.71 (43)	1.93 (49)	3.65 (93)	3.97 (101)	4.88 (124)	3.99 (101)	4.18 (106)	3.27 (83)	2.92 (74)	2.15 (55)	1.70 (43)	35.95 (913)
Average snowfall inches (cm)	10.4 (26)	10.1 (26)	4.6 (12)	1.1 (2.8)	0.0 (0.0)	0.0 (0.0)	0.0 (0.0)	0.0 (0.0)	0.0 (0.0)	0.1 (0.25)	1.8 (4.6)	8.8 (22)	36.9 (94)
Average precipitation days (≥ 0.01 in)	9.4	8.2	7.6	11.0	12.8	11.2	8.9	9.2	8.6	9.8	8.5	9.4	114.6
Average snowy days (≥ 0.1 in)	6.8	6.0	3.2	0.9	0.0	0.0	0.0	0.0	0.0	0.1	1.3	5.4	23.7
Source: NOAA

== Demographics ==
Historical population
Census	Pop.	Note	%±
1860	1,456		—
1870	2,633		80.8%
1880	2,969		12.8%
1890	6,321		112.9%
1900	7,419		17.4%
1910	8,740		17.8%
1920	12,558		43.7%
1930	17,176		36.8%
1940	19,242		12.0%
1950	21,233		10.3%
1960	30,004		41.3%
1970	40,271		34.2%
1980	50,365		25.1%
1990	56,894		13.0%
2000	64,825		13.9%
2010	70,718		9.1%
2020	71,158		0.6%
2024 (est.)	71,461		0.4%
U.S. Decennial Census

=== 2020 census ===
As of the 2020 census, Waukesha had a population of 71,158. The median age was 37.5 years. 21.4% of residents were under the age of 18 and 15.4% were 65 years of age or older. For every 100 females, there were 95.6 males, and for every 100 females age 18 and over, there were 93.9 males.

The population density was 2,788.1 inhabitants per square mile (1,076.5/km^{2}). The average housing unit density was 1,225.6 units per square mile (473.2 units/km^{2}). 99.8% of residents lived in urban areas, while 0.2% lived in rural areas.

There were 30,097 households in Waukesha, of which 27.2% had children under the age of 18 living in them. Of all households, 43.8% were married-couple households, 20.3% were households with a male householder and no spouse or partner present, and 27.7% were households with a female householder and no spouse or partner present. About 32.8% of all households were made up of individuals, and 11.7% had someone living alone who was 65 years of age or older.

There were 31,280 housing units, of which 3.8% were vacant. The homeowner vacancy rate was 0.7%, and the rental vacancy rate was 4.5%.

The 2020 census population of the city included 351 people incarcerated in adult correctional facilities and 793 people in student housing.

Racial composition as of the 2020 census
Race	Number	Percentage
White	55,908	78.6%
Black or African American	2,466	3.5%
American Indian and Alaska Native	373	0.5%
Asian	2,404	3.4%
Native Hawaiian and Other Pacific Islander	41	0.1%
Some other race	3,162	4.4%
Two or more races	6,804	9.6%
Hispanic or Latino (of any race)	9,979	14.0%

=== 2016-2020 ACS estimates ===
According to the American Community Survey estimates for 2016-2020, the median income for a household in the city was $65,688, and the median income for a family was $84,972. Male full-time workers had a median income of $59,800 versus $43,168 for female workers. The per capita income for the city was $34,785. About 7.5% of families and 11.1% of the population were below the poverty line, including 18.1% of those under age 18 and 6.8% of those age 65 or over. Of the population age 25 and over, 92.3% were high school graduates or higher and 38.7% had a bachelor's degree or higher.

=== 2010 census ===
As of the census of 2010, there were 70,718 people, 28,295 households, and 17,506 families residing in the city. The population density was 2,850.4 inhabitants per square mile (1,100.5/km^{2}). There were 29,843 housing units at an average density of 1,202.9 units per square mile (464.4 units/km^{2}). The racial makeup of the city was 88.1% White, 2.3% African American, 0.4% Native American, 3.5% Asian, 3.5% from other races, and 2.1% from two or more races. Hispanic or Latino of any race were 12.1% of the population.

There were 28,295 households, of which 32.1% had children under the age of 18 living with them, 46.9% were married couples living together, 10.7% had a female householder with no husband present, 4.3% had a male householder with no wife present, and 38.1% were non-families. 30.3% of all households were made up of individuals, and 9.3% had someone living alone who was 65 years of age or older. The average household size was 2.40 and the average family size was 3.02.

The median age in the city was 34.2 years. 23.7% of residents were under the age of 18; 10.8% were between the ages of 18 and 24; 30.4% were from 25 to 44; 24.7% were from 45 to 64; and 10.6% were 65 years of age or older. The gender makeup of the city was 49.0% male and 51.0% female.

=== 2000 census ===
As of the census of 2000, there were 64,825 people, 25,663 households, and 16,296 families residing in the city. The population density was 3,000.5 people per square mile (1,158.5 people/km^{2}). There were 26,856 housing units at an average density of 1,243.1 units per square mile (480.0 units/km^{2}). The racial makeup of the city was 91.22% White, 1.28% African American, 0.33% Native American, 2.17% Asian, 0.04% Pacific Islander, 3.31% from other races, and 1.65% from two or more races. Hispanic or Latino of any race were 8.58% of the population.

There were 25,663 households, out of which 32.5% of households had children under age 18 living with them, 50.2% were married couples living together, 9.8% had a female householder with no husband present, and 36.5% were non-families. Twenty-nine percent of all households were made up of individuals, and 9.2% had someone living alone who was 65 years of age or older. The average household size was 2.43 people and the average family size was 3.04 people.

In the city, the population was spread out, with 24.7% under the age of 18, 10.8% from 18 to 24, 33.6% from 25 to 44, 20.2% from 45 to 64, and 10.6% who were 65 years of age or older. The median age was 33 years. For every 100 females, there were 95.6 males. For every 100 females age 18 and over, there were 93.8 males.

The median income for a household in the city was $50,084, and the median income for a family was $60,841. Males had a median income of $40,743 versus $29,279 for females. The per capita income for the city was $23,242. About 3.0% of families and 5.4% of the population were below the poverty line, including 6.0% of those under age 18 and 5.9% of those age 65 or over.

== Economy ==
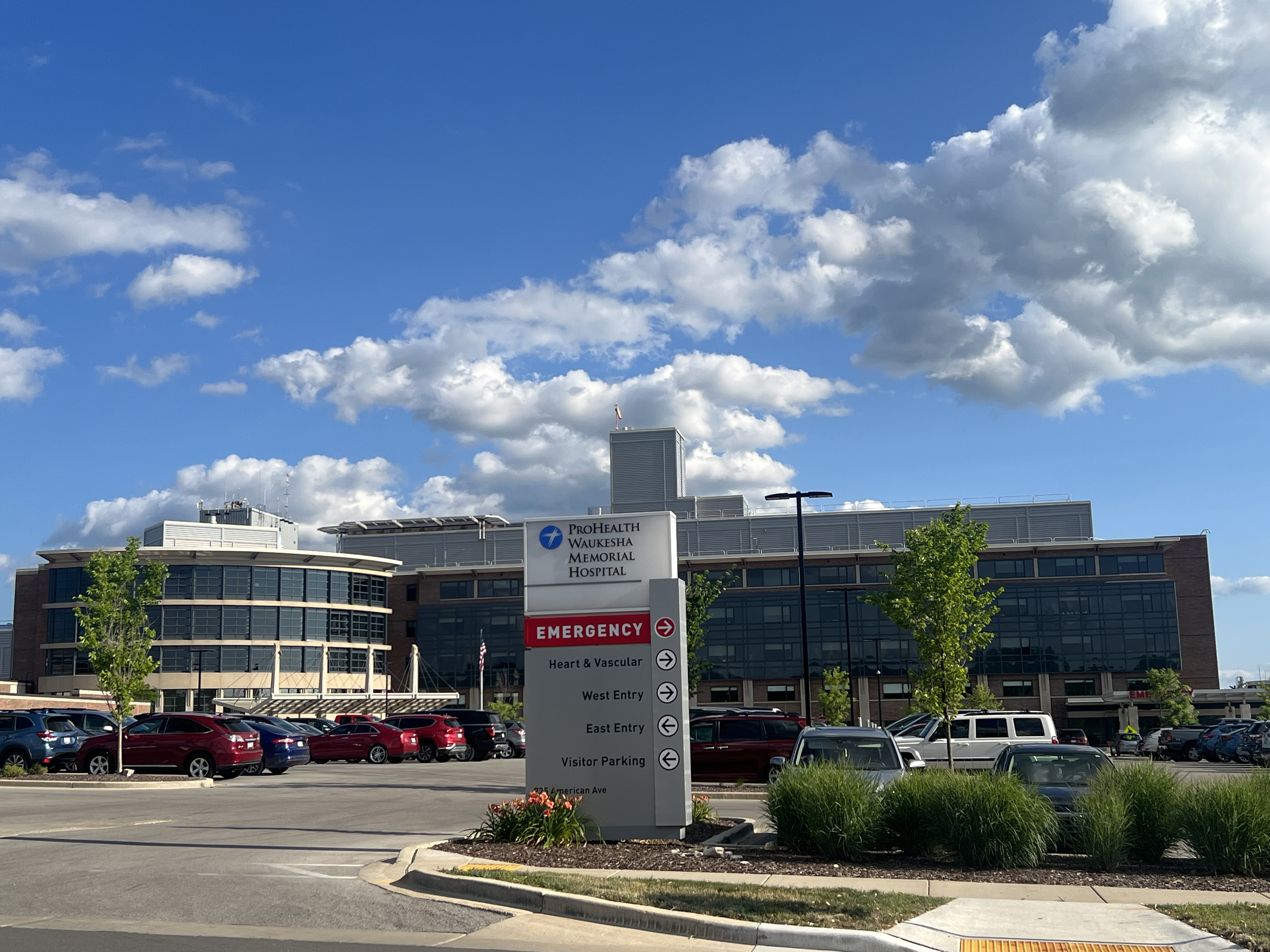
Waukesha Memorial Hospital

According to Waukesha's 2017 Comprehensive Annual Financial Report, the top employers in the city are:

#	Employer	# of Employees
1	GE Healthcare	2,477
2	Waukesha Memorial Hospital	2,149
3	Waukesha School District	1,800
4	Waukesha County	1,354
5	Cooper Power Systems	1,006
6	Generac Power Systems	759
7	Carroll University	742
8	HUSCO International	685
9	Waukesha Electric Systems	631
10	City of Waukesha	487

== Education ==
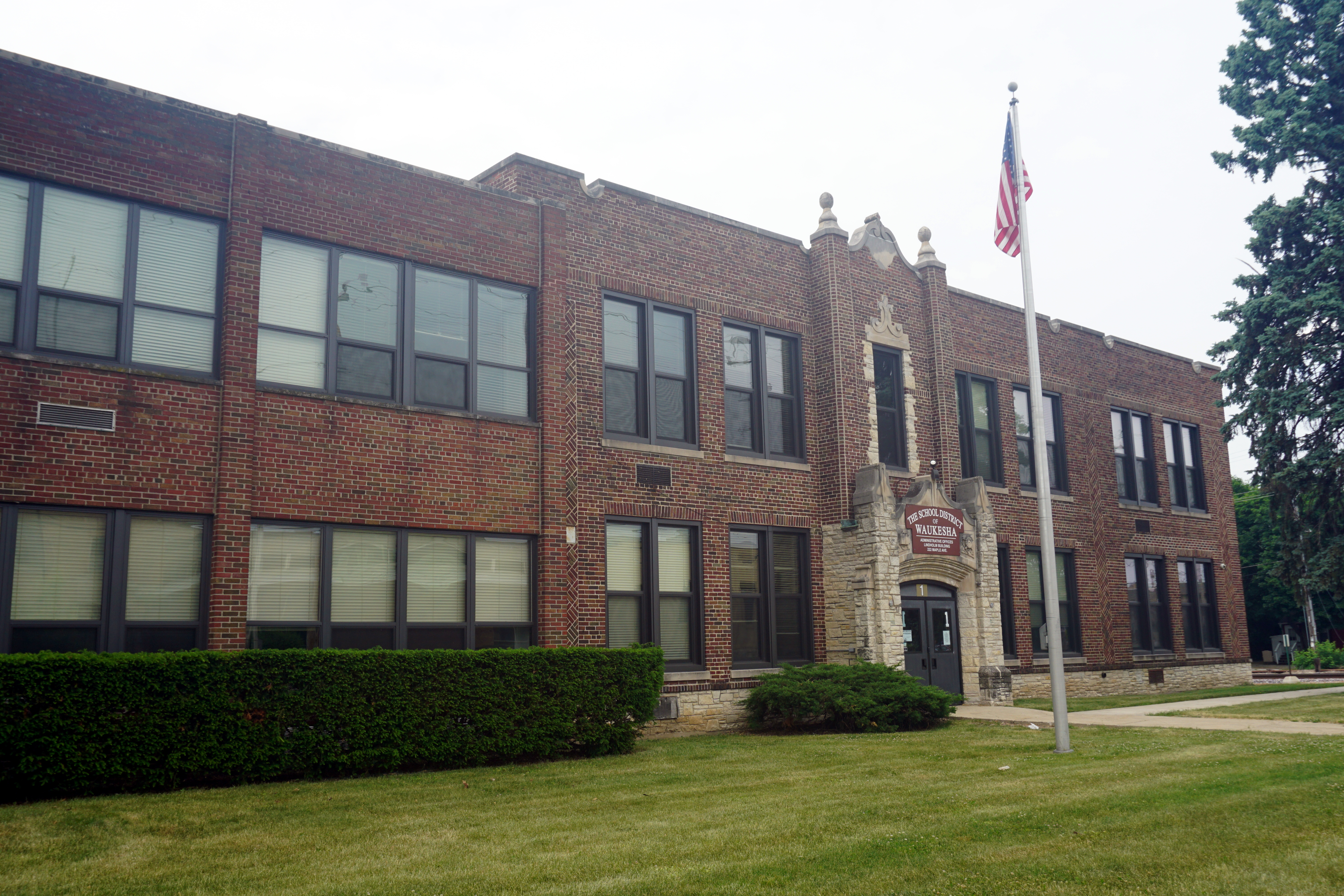
Waukesha School District administration building

The public Waukesha School District serves the city for primary and secondary education. The district serves over 11,000 students and administers three high schools (Waukesha North High School, Waukesha South High School and Waukesha West High School), four middle schools, 12 elementary schools, and five charter schools. Private schools include the Waukesha Catholic School System, Catholic Memorial High School, Mt. Calvary Lutheran School (Pre-K–8) and Trinity Lutheran School (Pre-K–8) of the WELS.

In higher education, Waukesha is home to Carroll University, a private Presbyterian university which opened in 1846 and is the oldest college in the state. Waukesha County Technical College has a campus located in the downtown area. The University of Wisconsin–Milwaukee at Waukesha operated from 1966 to 2025.

One of the two New Tribes Bible Institute campuses within the United States is located on a large hill in central Waukesha. Operated by New Tribes Mission, the school doubles as the first part of a four-year missionary training program, which includes field training in the U.S.

== Infrastructure ==
Waukesha Metro Transit provides fixed-route and dial-a-ride transit services within the city. Intercity bus services are provided by Badger Bus, Flixbus, Lamers Bus Lines, and Wisconsin Coach Lines. The Union Pacific (Chicago & North Western) Waukesha Subdivision terminates at WI 164. The line previously extended to Lancaster on the southwest corner of Wisconsin. The former Milwaukee Road line between Milwaukee and Milton still runs through Waukesha. The Soo Line's Chicago to Portal main line had a division point at Waukesha.

In 2023, the city switched from groundwater with unsafe levels of radium to water from Lake Michigan through 35 miles (56 km) of pipelines.

== Sister cities ==
Waukesha is the sister city of:

- Kokshetau, Kazakhstan (since 1989)
