= 1958 Wisconsin Supreme Court election =

- April 1, 1958

Candidate	William H. Dieterich	Emmert L. Wingert
Popular vote	232,955	211,319
Percentage	52.43%	47.57%
Justice before election
Emmert L. Wingert
Elected Justice
William H. Dieterich

The 1958 Wisconsin Supreme Court election was held on Tuesday, April 1, 1958, to elect a justice to the Wisconsin Supreme Court for a ten-year term. William H. Dieterich defeated incumbent justice Emmert L. Wingert (who had been appointed after the death on the bench of Edward J. Gehl) by a comfortable margin. The election result was considered to be a seismic upset. Wisconsin voters had rarely previously unseated incumbent Supreme Court justices. Dieterich was a perennial candidate for the state supreme court and state attorney general who usually lost by sizable margins (having only two years earlier been defeated in a general election for another supreme court seat by a margin of more than 4–1). Before the result, there were few signs that Dieterich stood any chance of winning, let alone winning (as he did) with a 4.8 percent margin and with a lead in 46 of the state's 71 counties.

== Candidates ==
Wingert was challenged by William H. Dieterich. Both Wingert and Dieterich were well-affiliated with the Republican Party. Wingert was a Republican, and had been appointed to the court by a Republican governor. Originally a member of the Progressive Party, by 1958 Dieterich had long affiliated himself with the Republican Party, and had twice unsuccessfully run in Republican primary elections for state attorney general (in 1946 and 1948)

=== Wingert ===
Emmert L. Wingert had been appointed to fill a vacancy left on the bench. Wingert resided in Dane County.

=== Dieterich ===
William H. Dieterich (a 60-year-old lawyer who resided in Hartford, Wisconsin and worked in Milwaukee) was a longtime Wisconsin perennial candidate. He had run previous unsuccessful campaigns for statewide office. This included five campaigns for state attorney general, running as a Progressive in his first campaigns for that office (1942, and 1944) and as a Republican in his two most recent runs. He had twice run for supreme court, running in both 1954 (losing that general election by 19.5-points, 59.76% to 40.24%) and 1956 (losing that general election by 55-points, 77.59% to 22.41%).

== Campaign ==
With Dieterich regularly losing statewide elections in the past, and Wisconsin having rarely previously ousted incumbent justices of its state supreme court, most experts discounted Dieterich's chances of unseating Wingert. Wingert's campaign did not make major noise during the campaign, which furthered perceptions that the April 1958 elections would see a routine outcome and return the incumbent justice to a full term. Wingert ran a low-intensity campaign while Dieterich lacked substantial campaign infrastructure, resulting in a hardly-newsworthy campaign ahead of the election.

While Wingert lacked name recognition, he enjoyed strong support from nearly all organized forces in the states electoral politics: including the unanticipated endorsements from the main political action organization representing the interestes of trade unions in the state.

== Result ==
Dieterich won what was considered a shock victory over Wingert.

=== Statewide vote total ===
1958 Wisconsin Supreme Court election
Party	Candidate	Votes	%
General election (April 1, 1958)
Nonpartisan	William H. Dieterich	232,955	52.43
Nonpartisan	Emmert L. Wingert (incumbent)	211,319	47.57
Total votes		444,274	100

=== Analysis ===
Wisconsin voters had rarely unseated incumbent Supreme Court justices, with the only instances in the previous half-century having been in 1908, 1917, and 1947. Before then, an incumbent had also been unseated in 1855.

John Wyngaard of the Green Bay Press-Gazette wrote in his news report on the result,

The defeat of Justice Emmert L. Wingert of the State Supreme Court in the desultory state election on Tuesday will go down as one of the most startling upsets in the history of the Wisconsin elective judiciary. The triumph of W. H. Dietrich of Hartford, narrow as it was, nevertheless caught lawyers, politicians, and students of Wisconsin electoral behavior entirely by surprise. There was no hint during the pre-election campaign, no isssue of any kind that attracted public notice, to suggest that the people of Wisconsin would break their almost inviolable rule and refuse to retain on the state's highest court an incumbent judge.

While it had been considered notable for defying the state's norm of re-electing non-controversial incumbents, the 1947 result had been much less of a shock than the 1958 result. The 1947 winner, Henry P. Hughes, was a well-known circuit court judge who had only the year before run a competitive challenge to an incumbent in the election for a different Wisconsin Supreme Court seat. Meanwhile, Dieterich was a perennial office seeker who had long performed weakly in state elections, including being routed by a 3–1 margin in the 1956 election for an open seat on the supreme court. Additionally, Dietetrich had a much less substantial campaign organization behind him than 1947 winner had enjoyed.

After the election, prognosticators pondered whether the result indicated an anti-incumbent sentiment taking root amongst the Wisconsin electorate. The election coincided with local elections in which several incumbent Wisconsin mayors lost re-election. This included the sixth-term incumbent mayors of Appleton and Oconomowoc. Incumbent mayors were also beaten in Ashland, Edgerton, Neenah, Neenah, and St. Francis. However the local defeats of incumbents did not necessarily coincide with Dietetrich support. For example, while five incumbent city councilors lost re-election in the City of Green Bay, Wingert led in every precinct of the same city.

An explanation offered as possible reason for the outcome was that Wingert lacked name recognition with the Wisconsin electorate and his supporters had taken too much comfort in the state's tradition of re-electing justices and consequentially put forth too little of an effort on getting out the vote for him; while Dieterich's eight previous appearances on statewide ballots built him name recognition that had finally paid off with an electoral victory.

=== By county ===
Dieterich's win was geographically broad. He led Wingert in 46 of the state's 71 counties (which was described as "sweep[ing]").

Wingert enjoyed a narrow lead in his home county of Dane. While Wingert received strong results in the Republican strongholds of suburban Milwaukee County, Deiterich narrowly led him in the full county result. Brown County (the location of the City of Green Bay) was an outlier county compared to most of the state, with Wingert holding a broad margin over Dieterich in that county. In Brown County, Wingert swept all 24 wards in the City of Green Bay, and also won large margins in other communities (such as Allouez, De Pere, Preble) while Dieterich led Wingert in only five of Brown County's 57 electoral precincts. Dieterich only led in the Town of Green Bay (a separate municipality than the city), Pittsfield, and Wrightstown.

== Aftermath ==
As of 2025, incumbent justices have only been unseated three subsequent times: 1967, 2008, and 2020.

The November 1958 elections that followed in Wisconsin saw the Democratic Party end decades of Republican dominance in Wisconsin state politics.
