= 1956 Wisconsin Supreme Court election =

- April 3, 1956

Candidate	Thomas E. Fairchild	William H. Dieterich
Popular vote	574,429	165,953
Percentage	77.59%	22.41%
Justice before election
Edward T. Fairchild
Elected Justice
Thomas E. Fairchild

The 1956 Wisconsin Supreme Court election was held on Tuesday, April 3, 1956 to elect a justice to a full ten-year seat the Wisconsin Supreme Court. Thomas E. Fairchild (son of incumbent justice Edward T. Fairchild – who was not seeking reelection) won the election. He handily defeated William H. Dieterich (a perennial candidate for state office, who later won a surprise victory in the 1958 election to the court).

Prior to the general election, a nonpartisan primary was held in which both Fairchild and Dieterich advanced against former state legislator Clair Finch.

== Candidates ==
- Thomas E. Fairchild: former United States Attorney, former Wisconsin attorney general, and son of the outgoing incumbent justice
- William H. Dieterich: Milwaukee County-based lawyer; perennial candidate (Note: unsuccessful candidate for Wisconsin attorney general (1942, 1944, 1946, and 1948) and Supreme Court in 1954) for state office; former special assistant attorney general of Wisconsin (1937–1938); former Wisconsin commander of the Disabled American Veterans
- Clair Finch: former state legislator

== Results ==
1956 Wisconsin Supreme Court election
Party	Candidate	Votes	%
Primary election (March 6, 1956)
Nonpartisan	Thomas E. Fairchild	250,442	71.77
Nonpartisan	William H. Dieterich	68,288	19.57
Nonpartisan	Clair Finch	30,244	8.67
Total votes		348,974	100
General Election (April 3, 1956)
Nonpartisan	Thomas E. Fairchild	574,429	77.59
Nonpartisan	William H. Dieterich	165,953	22.41
Total votes		740,382	100
