= 1957 Wisconsin Supreme Court election =

- April 2, 1957
Candidate	George R. Currie
Popular vote	757,065
Percentage	unopposed
Justice before election
George R. Currie
Elected Justice
George R. Currie

The 1957 Wisconsin Supreme Court election was held on Tuesday, April 2, 1957 to elect a justice to a full ten-year seat the Wisconsin Supreme Court. Incumbent justice George R. Currie was re-elected without an opponent. Currie had been appointed in August 1951 by Governor Walter J. Kohler Jr. to fill the vacancy left by the resignation of Justice Henry P. Hughes) At the time, his appointment was praised as diversifying the experiences of the Supreme Court to include a recent practicing attorney.

== Result ==
1957 Wisconsin Supreme Court election
Party	Candidate	Votes	%
General election (April 2, 1957)
Nonpartisan	George R. Currie (incumbent)	757,065	unopposed
Total votes		unopposed	100
