= William H. Dieterich (judge) =

American lawyer, politician, and judge

The Honorable William H. Dieterich
- Portrait photograph (as a justice)

Justice of the Wisconsin Supreme Court
- In office January 1, 1959 – July 23, 1964
- Preceded by: Emmert L. Wingert
- Succeeded by: Nathan Heffernan

Personal details
- Born: William Herbert Dieterich; December 18, 1897 Milwaukee, Wisconsin
- Died: July 23, 1964 (aged 66) Milwaukee, Wisconsin
- Resting place: Pleasant Hill Cemetery; Hartford, Wisconsin
- Party: Republican
- Spouses: Kathryn Marie Block; (died 1990)
- Children: William H. Dieterich III
- Parents: William V. Dieterich (father); Martha (Wolf) Dieterich (mother)
- Education: University of Wisconsin–Madison; Marquette University Law School
- Profession: lawyer, judge

Military service
- Allegiance: United States
- Branch/service: United States Army
- Years of service: 1917–1919
- Unit: 120th Field Artillery
- Battles/wars: World War I

William Herbert Dieterich (December 18, 1897 – July 23, 1964) was an attorney and jurist from Wisconsin. He was a justice of the Wisconsin Supreme Court from 1959 until his death in 1964.

== Early life ==
He was born at his father's farm in Milwaukee County, Wisconsin. He enlisted in the Wisconsin National Guard in 1917 during World War I. He helped found the American Legion.

After the war was over, he went to college at the University of Wisconsin–Madison and the University of Montana and later to law school at Marquette University Law School. He passed his bar exam in 1923 to become a lawyer.

== Career ==
He served as a trial attorney in Milwaukee and Washington Counties for 36 years. He lost several elections for Wisconsin's Attorney General and Wisconsin Supreme Court.

Dieterich was first elected to the Wisconsin Supreme Court in 1958, when he defeated Emmert L. Wingert in 1958 to become a Justice. In 1961, he convinced the Wisconsin Legislature to employ law clerks for the Supreme Court.

== Personal life ==
He had a son William H. Dieterich III with his wife Kathryn Block. Dieterich died on July 23, 1964.

== Electoral history ==
=== Wisconsin Attorney General (1948) ===
1948 Wisconsin Attorney General election
Party	Candidate	Votes	%	±%
Primary Election, September 21, 1948
Republican	Donald J. Martin	154,128	36.75%	
Republican	William H. Dieterich	104,187	24.84%	
Democratic	Thomas E. Fairchild	97,435	23.23%	
Republican	Frank X. Didier	27,316	6.51%	
Republican	Grover L. Broadfoot (incumbent)	26,572	6.34%	
Progressive	Michael Essin	6,180	1.47%	
Socialist	Anna Mae Davis	3,606	0.86%	
Total votes		'419,424'	'100.0%'	
General Election, November 2, 1948
Democratic	Thomas E. Fairchild	622,312	50.67%	+21.96%
Republican	Donald J. Martin	583,298	47.49%	−22.47%
Progressive	Michael Essin	11,908	0.97%	
Socialist	Anna Mae Davis	10,641	0.87%	−0.46%
Total votes		'1,228,159'	'100.0%'	+25.88%
Democratic gain from Republican				

=== Wisconsin Supreme Court (1954, 1956, 1958) ===
1954 Wisconsin Supreme Court election
Party	Candidate	Votes	%	±%
Nonpartisan Primary, March 9, 1954
Nonpartisan	Roland J. Steinle (incumbent)	125,530	61.74	
Nonpartisan	William H. Dieterich	49,669	24.43	
Nonpartisan	Perry J. Stearns	28,134	13.84	
Total votes		203,333	100	
General Election, April 6, 1954
Nonpartisan	Roland J. Steinle (incumbent)	297,369	59.76	
Nonpartisan	William H. Dieterich	200,224	40.24	
Plurality		97,145	19.52	
Total votes		497,593	100	

1956 Wisconsin Supreme Court election
Party	Candidate	Votes	%	±%
Primary Election, March 6, 1956
Nonpartisan	Thomas E. Fairchild	250,442	71.77	
Nonpartisan	William H. Dieterich	68,288	19.57	
Nonpartisan	Clair L. Finch	30,244	8.67	
Total votes		348,974	100	
General Election, April 3, 1956
Nonpartisan	Thomas E. Fairchild	574,429	77.59	
Nonpartisan	William H. Dieterich	165,953	22.41	
Total votes		740,382	100	

1958 Wisconsin Supreme Court election
Party	Candidate	Votes	%	±%
General Election, April 1, 1958
Nonpartisan	William H. Dieterich	232,955	52.43	+30.02%
Nonpartisan	Emmert L. Wingert (incumbent)	211,319	47.57	
Total votes		444,274	100	-41.32

== Notes ==
Party political offices
Preceded by Otto F. Christenson	Progressive nominee for Attorney General of Wisconsin; 1942, 1944	Succeeded by None
