= Senator Bashford =

Senator Bashford may refer to:

- Coles Bashford (1816–1878), Wisconsin State Senate
- Robert McKee Bashford (1845–1911), Wisconsin State Senate
