= 1967 Wisconsin Supreme Court election =

- April 4, 1967

Candidate	Robert W. Hansen	George R. Currie
Popular vote	479,117	377,426
Percentage	55.94%	44.06%
Justice before election
George R. Currie
Elected Justice
Robert W. Hansen

The 1967 Wisconsin Supreme Court election was held on Tuesday, April 4, 1967, to elect a justice to the Wisconsin Supreme Court for a ten-year term. It was preceded by a primary election on March 7, 1967. In the election, Robert W. Hansen defeated incumbent chief justice George R. Currie. The election was the first instance in the state's history in which a chief justice of the Supreme Court was unseated in an election.

== Background ==
Currie had been appointed to the court in 1951 to fill a vacancy. He was elected to a full term unopposed later that year, and became chief justice in 1964. He was regarded to be a well-respected justice by both legal scholars and other American judges.

The Constitution of Wisconsin imposed a mandatory retirement age of 70 on judges, which meant that if Currie were to be re-elected in 1967, he was going to only be able to serve two years and one month of the ten year term. Consequentially, the state's governor would be given an opportunity to appoint a successor.

In 1966, the Supreme Court attracted public backlash when it ruled in State v. Milwaukee Braves, Inc that the state would not be able to impose its antitrust law in a manner that would have prevented the Milwaukee Braves professional baseball team from relocating to Atlanta. Currie joined the majority in that 4–3 decision. The Braves ultimately relocated as planned, leaving Wisconsin without a Major League Baseball team.

== Candidates ==
Currie (photographed) was the incumbent chief justice

Advanced to general election

- George R. Currie, incumbent justice since 1951, chief justice since 1964
- Robert W. Hansen, judge of the Milwaukee District Court since 1954

Eliminated in primary

- Harry Halloway, Milwaukee-based attorney, perennial judicial candidate

== Campaign ==
=== Primary ===
Hansen and his campaign's supporters also made an issue of the fact that Currie was already 67 years old, and would be forced to retire upon reaching the mandatory retirement age only two years and one month into the ten year term. Currie argued that this was not a concern. Currie argued that it was advantageous to the state for him to reach the retirement age mid-term, because if he reached the age of retirement while still a member of the bench, the state constitution would allow him to serve as a reserve circuit judge. Fellow justice Thomas E. Fairchild defended Currie from this line of criticism at a midwinter meeting of the Wisconsin State Bar Association, remarking,

It would be foolish to defeat a good man and thus prevent him from retiring and becoming eligible to serve as a reserve judge.

Some issue was made of Hansen's continued membership in the Fraternal Order of Eagles (F.O.E.), because a then-proposed code of judicial ethics included a role which would have prevented judges from being "a member of or participate in the affairs of any group whose activities are inconsistent... with the impartial exercise of his judicial duties," and several other judges in the state had already resigned the membership in the F.O.E. under the belief that it would come into conflict with this rule if it were ratified. Hansen, however, stood in opposition to the proposed code and refused to resign from the F.O.E., remarking that he would sooner quit being a judge then resign from the organization. His persistence in refusing to disassociation from the F.O.E. led the AFL-CIO's Committee on Political Education to decline to endorse Hansen, despite Hansen having (prior to becoming a judge) previously provided legal representation to nearly fifteen AFL-CIO member unions.

Currie highlighted his experience, noting that in his more than fifteen years as a judge he had authored nearly 600 opinions and participated in nearly 4,000 decisions.

During the primary election, Hansen had pledged not to make a campaign issue of the State v. Milwaukee Braves, Inc decision.

Currie received nearly the endorsement of nearly every newspaper editorial board that opted to make an endorsement in the race, as well as many leading officials in the state. Additionally, ahead of the primary, the Milwaukee Bar Association conducted a judicial qualification poll, in which Currie received a 97.8% qualification rating while Hansen received a much lower 75.6% qualification rating.

Attorney Harry Halloway was recognized as trailing far behind Currie and Hansen in support. However, ahead of the primary election vote, most observers wrongly believed that Currie had a sizable lead in support over Hansen.

=== General election ===
Ahead of the primary, Currie had been widely seen as a broad and insurmountable front-runner. However, the narrow result of the primary erased this perception, and it became clear the Hansen had a serious chance of unseating him in the general election. Now seeing a path to victory, Hansen's general election campaign was more aggressive than his primary campaign had been, and placed an even greater focus on appealing to the emotional sentiments of Wisconsin voters about the Braves' move to Atlanta.

Despite his earlier pledge not to, Hansen took advantage of the unpopularity of the State v. Milwaukee Braves, Inc.' decision. One week prior to the election, he delivered a speech and made a press release blaming Currie's decisive vote in that decision for allowing the Braves' move to Atlanta. Hansen pointed to Currie's campaign's touting of his extensive judicial experience as reason to hold him accountable for that decision, remarking, "when you take credit for a whole barrel of apples, you cannot expect that a bad apple in the barrel will be overlooked." Currie opted to refuse to respond to Hansen's attacks, likely in fear that a response would only legitimize the criticism in the eyes of voters.

== Results ==
=== Primary ===
1967 Wisconsin Supreme Court election
Party	Candidate	Votes	%
Primary election (March 7, 1967)
Nonpartisan	George R. Currie (incumbent)	91,691	43.80
Nonpartisan	Robert W. Hansen	90,539	43.25
Nonpartisan	Harry Halloway	27,119	12.95
Total votes		209,349	100

Hansen led in Milwaukee by a large margin and other cities near Milwaukee. He received unexpectedly strong support elsewhere in the state.

=== General election ===
Currie's defeat marked the first instance in which a chief justice of the state's supreme court was unseated in an election. This was also only the six time that any Wisconsin Supreme Court justice had lose reelection (after 1855, 1908, 1917, 1947, and 1958). As of 2026, there have only been two further instances of incumbent justices losing reelection (2008 and 2020). The 1967 election was the third and most recent occasion in which a previously-elected incumbent had lost reelection (after 1855 and 1917), with all other incumbents who lost re-election having instead been appointed incumbents.

Prior to the close result of the primary, there was very little perception that Currie's had any expected likelihood of defeat. Due to the large role that public sentiment surrounding the Braves' move had seemingly played in Currie's defeat, some subsequent discourse called into question whether elections were a wise means of choosing judges in Wisconsin.

1967 Wisconsin Supreme Court election
Party	Candidate	Votes	%
General election (April 4, 1967)
Nonpartisan	Robert W. Hansen	479,117	55.94
Nonpartisan	George R. Currie (incumbent)	377,426	44.06
Total votes		688,466	100
