= 1908 Wisconsin Supreme Court special election =

- April 7, 1908
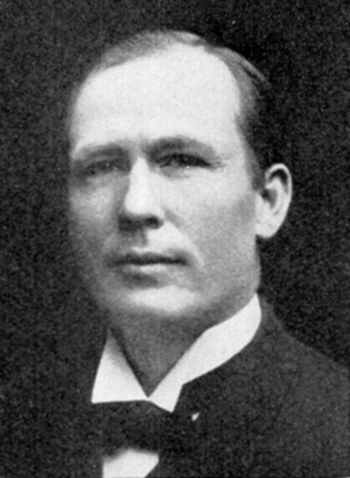

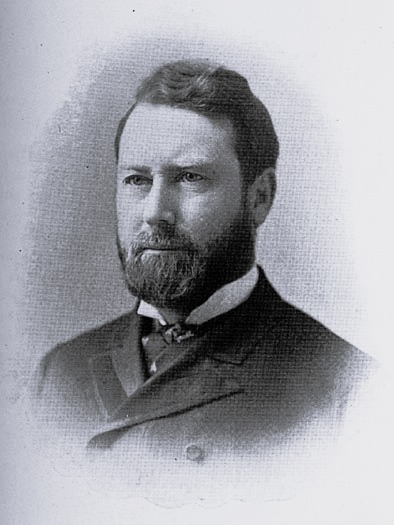

Candidate	John Barnes	Robert McKee Bashford	William Ruger
Popular vote	134,642	84,656	15,168
Percentage	57.42%	36.10%	6.47%
Justice before election
Robert McKee Bashford
Elected Justice
John Barnes

The 1908 Wisconsin Supreme Court special election was a special election held on Tuesday, April 7, 1908, to elect a justice to the Wisconsin Supreme Court. John Barnes unseated incumbent justice Robert McKee Bashford (who had been appointed to fill a vacancy).

This was only the second election in which an incumbent Wisconsin Supreme Court justice lost re-election, the first having been in 1855. This has only occurred in six subsequent instances (1917, 1947, 1958, 1967, 2008, 2020).

== Results ==
1908 Wisconsin Supreme Court special election
Party	Candidate	Votes	%	±%
General Election, April 7, 1908
Nonpartisan	John Barnes	134,642	57.42	
Nonpartisan	Robert McKee Bashford (incumbent)	84,656	36.10	
Nonpartisan	William Ruger	15,168	6.47	
	Scattering	30	0.01	
Plurality		49,986	21.32	
Total votes		234,496	100	
