= 1855 Wisconsin Supreme Court election =

- April 3, 1855
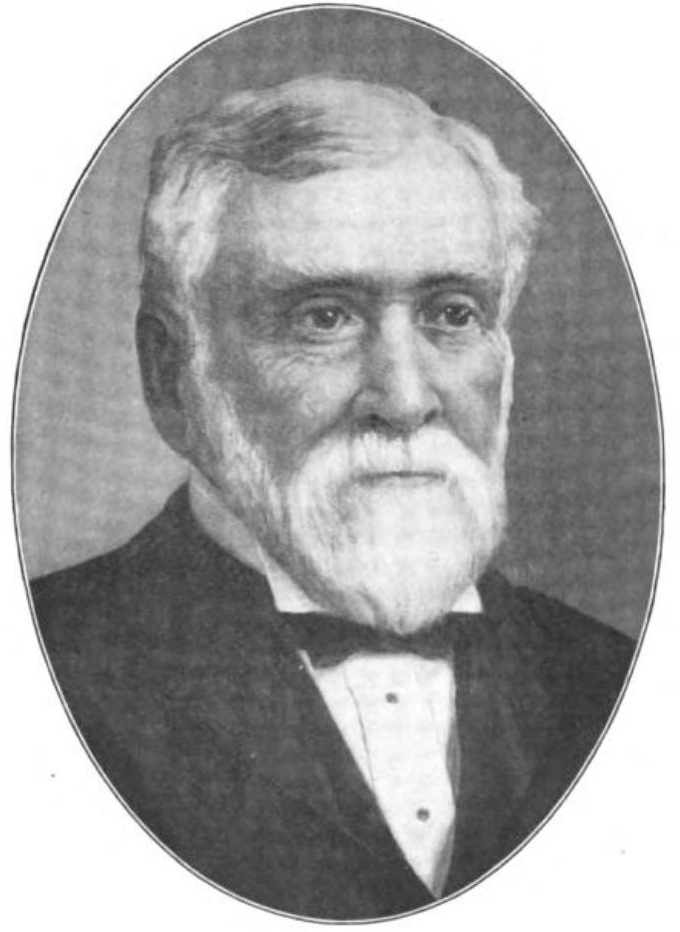

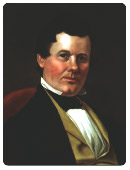
Candidate	Orsamus Cole	Samuel Crawford
Popular vote	32,881	25,733
Percentage	55.95%	43.79%
Justice before election
Samuel Crawford
Elected Justice
Orsamus Cole

The 1855 Wisconsin Supreme Court election was held on Tuesday, April 3, 1855, to elect a justice to the Wisconsin Supreme Court for a full term. Orsamus Cole unseated incumbent justice Samuel Crawford.

Crawford likely lost due to his opinion in Booth v. Ableman (later appealed to the U.S. Supreme Court in Ableman v. Booth) that the Fugitive Slave Laws were unconstitutional. He was the first Wisconsin Supreme Court justice to lose re-election. Since this election, it has only occurred in seven subsequent instances (1908, 1917, 1947, 1958, 1967, 2008, 2020).

== Results ==
1855 Wisconsin Supreme Court election
Party	Candidate	Votes	%	±%
General Election, April 3, 1855
Nonpartisan	Orsamus Cole	32,881	55.95	
Nonpartisan	Samuel Crawford (incumbent)	25,733	43.79	
Nonpartisan	James H. Knowlton (Write-in)	64	0.11	
	Scattering	90	0.15	
Plurality		7,148	12.16	
Total votes		58,768	100	
