= Samuel Crawford (jurist) =

American politician and judge (1820–1861)

The Honorable Samuel Crawford
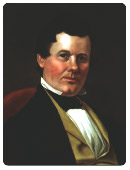

Justice of the Wisconsin Supreme Court
- In office June 1, 1853 – June 1, 1855
- Preceded by: Position established
- Succeeded by: Orsamus Cole

Personal details
- Born: April 20, 1820 Ballybay, Ireland, UK
- Died: February 28, 1861 (aged 40) Mineral Point, Wisconsin, U.S.
- Cause of death: Stroke
- Party: Democratic
- Spouse: Jane Milton Sweet
- Children: 4
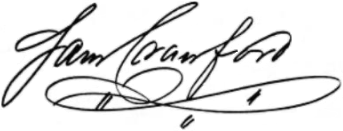
- Signature

Samuel Crawford (April 20, 1820 – February 28, 1861) was an Irish American immigrant, lawyer, and Wisconsin pioneer. He was one of the first elected justices of the Wisconsin Supreme Court in 1853. He was also the first incumbent Wisconsin Supreme Court justice to be defeated seeking re-election.

== Early life ==
Born in Ballybay, Ireland—then part of the United Kingdom of Great Britain and Ireland—Crawford emigrated to New York City in 1840. In 1841, he moved to Galena, Illinois, where his brothers lived; he studied law and was admitted to the Illinois bar in 1844.

Later that year, he moved north into the Wisconsin Territory, arriving first at New Diggings—then part of Iowa County—and, in December, settling in Mineral Point. He established a law practice there, in partnership with Francis J. Dunn and David W. Jones, and became involved with local affairs.

== Wisconsin Supreme Court ==
When an 1852 law established a new Wisconsin Supreme Court, Crawford was elected to serve as one of the first three justices, along with Abram D. Smith and Chief Justice Edward V. Whiton. The most significant case of his two years on the court was certainly Ableman v. Booth, which dealt with attempts by the federal government to prosecute Milwaukee abolitionist Sherman Booth. Booth had assisted Joshua Glover in his escape from slavery to freedom in Canada and was being prosecuted under the federal Fugitive Slave Act of 1850. The Wisconsin Supreme Court ruled, in 1854, that the Fugitive Slave Act was unconstitutional and freed Booth on a defective warrant. Judge Crawford dissented in part, concurring that the warrant was defective but dissenting that the Fugitive Slave Act was unconstitutional.

Though his opinion was ultimately validated by the Supreme Court of the United States in their 1859 decision on Ableman v. Booth, his dissent in the 1854 Booth case likely cost him re-election due to the strong anti-slavery sentiment in Wisconsin.

== Later years ==
Judge Crawford was defeated seeking re-election in 1855 and resumed his law practice in Mineral Point. He would later be selected as the Democratic Party's nominee for United States House of Representatives in Wisconsin's 2nd congressional district in 1856 and then for Attorney General of Wisconsin in 1859, but was unsuccessful in both campaigns.

At the time of his death at the relatively young age of 41, Crawford was described as an alcoholic. He died of "congestion of the brain" at his home in Mineral Point on February 28, 1861.

== Personal life ==
Crawford was married to Ms. Jane Milton Sweet, of Edgartown, Massachusetts, in 1848. They had four children. After Judge Crawford's death, in 1861, Jane remarried with John Montgomery Smith.

== Electoral history ==
=== Wisconsin Supreme Court (1852, 1855) ===
1852 Wisconsin Supreme Court election
Party	Candidate	Votes	%	±%
General Election, September 1852
Democratic	Samuel Crawford	10,520	53.48%	
Independent	Wiram Knowlton	9,151	46.52%	
Plurality		1,369	6.96%	
Total votes		19,671	100.0%	
Democratic win (new seat)				

1855 Wisconsin Supreme Court election
Party	Candidate	Votes	%	±%
General Election, April 3, 1855
Nonpartisan	Orsamus Cole	32,881	55.95%	
Nonpartisan	Samuel Crawford (incumbent)	25,733	43.79%	
Nonpartisan	James H. Knowlton (Write-in)	64	0.11%	
	Scattering	90	0.15%	
Plurality		7,148	12.16%	
Total votes		58,768	100.0%	

=== U.S. House of Representatives (1856) ===
Wisconsin's 2nd Congressional District Election, 1856
Party	Candidate	Votes	%	±%
General Election, November 4, 1856
Republican	Cadwallader C. Washburn	27,103	61.80%	+2.31%
Democratic	Samuel Crawford	16,750	38.20%	−1.57%
Plurality		10,353	23.61%	+3.87%
Total votes		43,853	100.0%	+118.71%
Republican gain from Democratic				

=== Wisconsin Attorney General (1859) ===
1859 Wisconsin Attorney General election
Party	Candidate	Votes	%	±%
General Election, November 8, 1859
Republican	James Henry Howe	60,569	53.71%	
Democratic	Samuel Crawford	52,209	46.29%	−3.93%
Plurality		8,360	7.41%	+6.96%
Total votes		112,778	100.0%	+26.54%
Republican gain from Democratic				

Party political offices
Preceded by Gabriel Bouck	Democratic nominee for Attorney General of Wisconsin; 1859	Succeeded by Philo A. Orton
Legal offices
Court established by 1852 Wisc. Act 395	Justice of the Wisconsin Supreme Court; 1853 – 1855	Succeeded by Orsamus Cole
