= John Barnes (judge) =

American lawyer and justice of the Wisconsin Supreme Court

The Honorable John Barnes
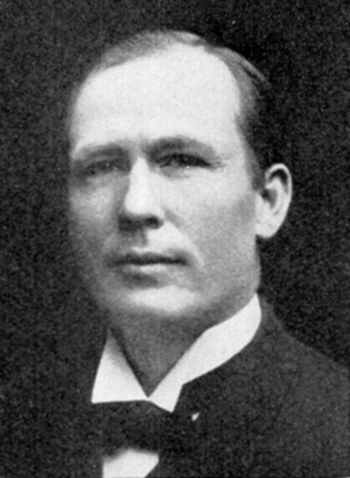

Justice of the Wisconsin Supreme Court
- In office July 1, 1908 – February 11, 1916
- Preceded by: Robert McKee Bashford
- Succeeded by: Marvin B. Rosenberry

Personal details
- Born: John Barnes; July 26, 1859 Manitowoc County, Wisconsin, U.S.
- Died: January 1, 1919 (aged 59) Milwaukee, Wisconsin, U.S.
- Cause of death: Stroke
- Resting place: Resurrection Cemetery; Madison, Wisconsin
- Party: Democratic
- Spouse: Julia Koelzer (m. 1887–1960)
- Children: 4
- Education: Oshkosh Normal School; University of Wisconsin–Madison (LLB)

John Barnes (July 26, 1859 – January 1, 1919) was an American attorney and judge from Wisconsin. He was a justice of the Wisconsin Supreme Court from 1908 until 1916, and was one of the first Wisconsin Railroad Commissioners. He worked as general counsel for the Northwestern Mutual Life Insurance Company from 1916 until his death.

== Early life and education ==
Born in 1859, on a farm in Manitowoc County, Wisconsin, Barnes was the son of Irish American immigrants who had arrived in the Wisconsin from Canada in 1858. Barnes graduated from Manitowoc High School in 1876 and attended the Oshkosh Normal School, after which he taught school for six years. He graduated from the University of Wisconsin Law School in 1885 and began practicing law in Oshkosh.

== Career ==
In 1887, Barnes relocated to Rhinelander, and became the first municipal judge of Oneida County, served as president of the local school board, and prospered in business. Barnes was a Democrat.

In 1905, he was appointed to the newly created Wisconsin Railroad Commission by Governor Robert M. La Follette. In 1908, he was elected to the Wisconsin Supreme Court in a special election after the death of Chief Justice John B. Cassoday. He defeated appointed justice Robert McKee Bashford, and went on to re-election to a full term in 1909. In 1916, however, Barnes resigned to become general counsel of the Northwestern Mutual Life Insurance Company.

== Personal life ==
Judge Barnes married Julia Koelzer, a childhood friend, in 1887. They had four children together. He was a Catholic and a member of the Knights of Columbus.

Barnes suffered a stroke at his office in Milwaukee on December 28, 1918, and died four days later, after developing pneumonia.

== Electoral history ==
1908 Wisconsin Supreme Court special election
Party	Candidate	Votes	%	±%
General Election, April 7, 1908
Nonpartisan	John Barnes	134,642	57.42%	
Nonpartisan	Robert M. Bashford (incumbent)	84,656	36.10%	
Nonpartisan	William Ruger	15,168	6.47%	
	Scattering	30	0.01%	
Plurality		49,986	21.32%	
Total votes		234,496	100.0%	

Legal offices
Preceded by Robert McKee Bashford	Justice of the Wisconsin Supreme Court; July 1, 1908 – February 11, 1916	Succeeded by Marvin B. Rosenberry
