= George R. Currie =

American judge

The Honorable George R. Currie
- portrait, circa 1957

19th Chief Justice of the Wisconsin Supreme Court
- In office January 1, 1964 – January 1, 1968
- Preceded by: Timothy Brown
- Succeeded by: E. Harold Hallows

Justice of the Wisconsin Supreme Court
- In office September 1, 1951 – August 1, 1967
- Appointed by: Walter J. Kohler Jr.
- Preceded by: Henry P. Hughes
- Succeeded by: Robert W. Hansen

Personal details
- Born: January 16, 1900 Princeton, Wisconsin, U.S.
- Died: June 9, 1983 (aged 83) Methodist Hospital, Madison, Wisconsin, U.S.
- Cause of death: Heart attack
- Education: Oshkosh Normal School; University of Wisconsin Law School
- Profession: lawyer, judge

George R. Currie (January 16, 1900 – June 9, 1983) was an American attorney and jurist who served as the 19th Chief Justice of the Wisconsin Supreme Court (1964–1968). He was the first Wisconsin chief justice to be unseated by electoral defeat.

== Biography ==
Born in Princeton, Wisconsin, Currie graduated from Montello High School in 1917 and went on to attend the Oshkosh Normal School (now the University of Wisconsin–Oshkosh). He began teaching in Manawa, Wisconsin, and then went to work as principal of a school in Hazelton, North Dakota. He saved money from these years to afford his admission to the University of Wisconsin Law School, where he graduated first in his class in 1925. In his senior year, he was editor-in-chief of the Wisconsin Law Review.

After being admitted to the state bar, he practiced law in Sheboygan, Wisconsin, for 26 years, specializing in corporate law.

In August 1951, Governor Walter J. Kohler Jr., appointed him to the Wisconsin Supreme Court to fill the vacancy caused by the resignation of Justice Henry P. Hughes. At the time, his appointment was praised as diversifying the experiences of the Supreme Court to include a recent practicing attorney. Currie was elected to a full term on the Court without opposition in 1957. He became Chief Justice due to seniority, following the retirement of Chief Justice Timothy Brown at the end of his term in January 1964.

portrait of Currie as chief justice

Currie was the first Wisconsin Chief Justice to be unseated by election, when he was defeated by Robert W. Hansen in the 1967 spring election. There were several factors that likely led to his defeat, including the court's unpopular decision ruling that the state could not use antitrust law to keep the Milwaukee Braves professional baseball team in Milwaukee. Currie was also only two years away from the mandatory judicial retirement age which existed at the time, which would have given the Governor, Warren P. Knowles, the power to appoint his successor in just two years.

After leaving the high court, he worked for many years as a reserve judge in Dane County, and, in 1970, was employed as a professor at the University of Wisconsin Law School. Among his students were future judges Moria Krueger, Angela Bartell, and Martha Bablitch.

Currie died of a heart attack in 1983.

Legal offices
Preceded by Henry P. Hughes	Justice of the Wisconsin Supreme Court; September 1, 1951 – January 1, 1968	Succeeded by Robert W. Hansen
Preceded by Timothy Brown	Chief Justice of the Wisconsin Supreme Court; January 1, 1964 – January 1, 1968	Succeeded by E. Harold Hallows
