= Carrie Pierce House =

Historic house in Wisconsin, United States

- U.S. National Register of Historic Places
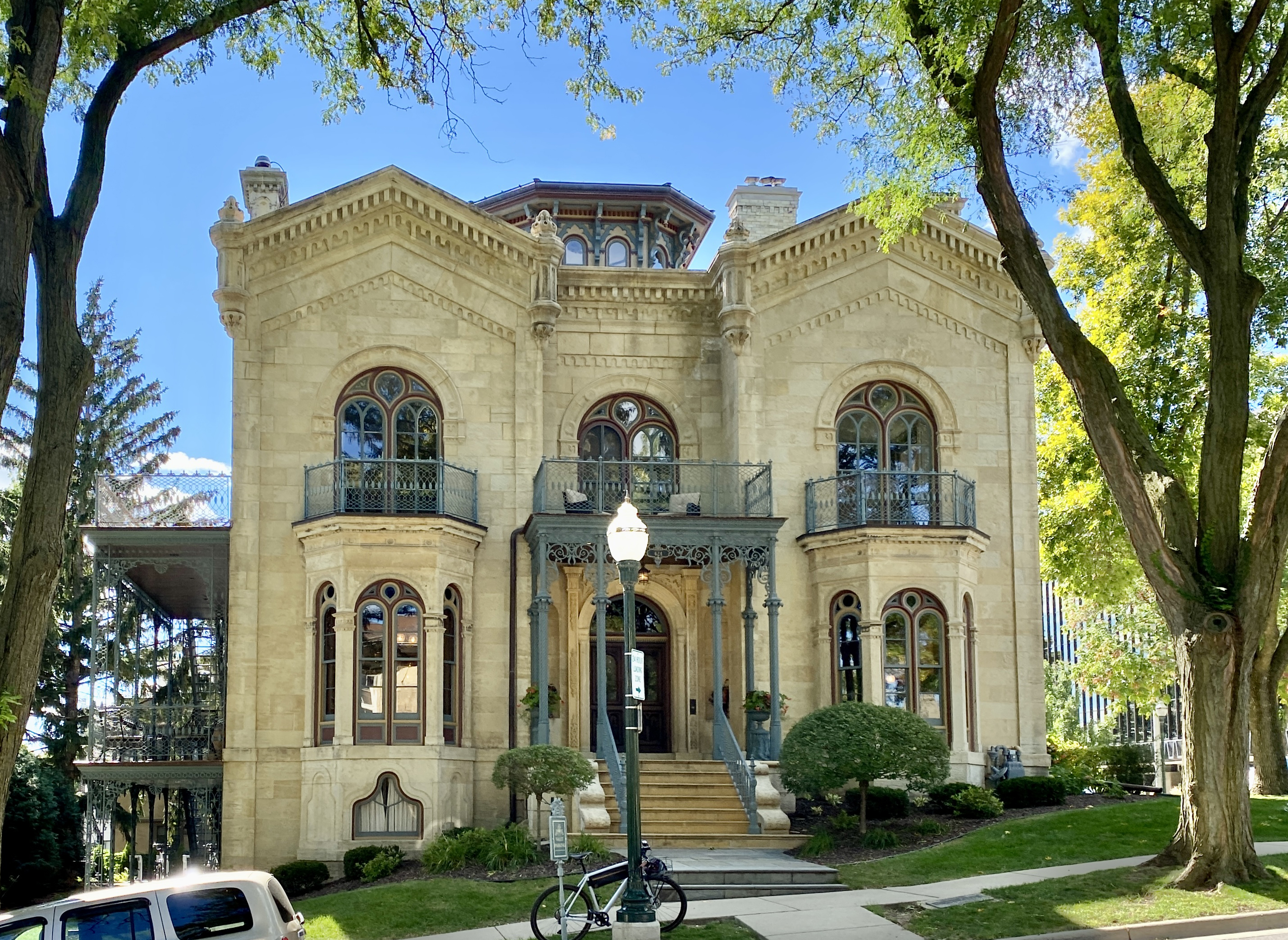
- Carrie Pierce House, east-facing front, September 2022

- Location within Wisconsin Location within the United States
- Location: 424 North Pinckney Street; Madison, Wisconsin; United States
- Coordinates: 43°4′43″N 89°23′15″W
- Area: 0.5 acres (0.20 ha)
- Built: 1857; 169 years ago
- Architect: August Kutzbock & Samuel Hunter Donnell
- Architectural style: Rundbogenstil / Romanesque Revival + Gothic Revival, Italianate
- Website: mansionhillinn.com
- NRHP reference No.: 72000048
- Added to NRHP: October 18, 1972

The Carrie Pierce House is an elegant house built about 1857 in Madison, Wisconsin, for Alexander McDonnell, one of the builders of the third Wisconsin State Capitol. In 1972 the house was listed on the National Register of Historic Places and, in 1985, converted to the Mansion Hill Inn.

== History ==
Alexander McDonnell was a building contractor in early Madison. In 1857, less than ten years after Wisconsin became a state, McDonnell's firm began work building the east wing of the third Wisconsin State Capitol. That same year McDonnell bought a wooded lot on a hill a quarter mile northwest of the capitol and hired the firm of August Kutzbock and Samuel Hunter Donnell (the two were also architects of the Capitol building) to design for him "the best house money could buy."

Kutzbock and Donnell designed the house with the exterior much as it looks today. It stands two stories, clad in Prairie du Chien sandstone, the same stone used for the third Capitol. (McDonnell built the railroad to bring the stone to Madison.) The exterior stonework on this house resembles that of the third Capitol, and some of the decoration inside the house is likewise said to resemble Kutzbock and Donnell's designs for the Capitol, so perhaps this house preserves some glimpses of that building, destroyed by fire in 1904.

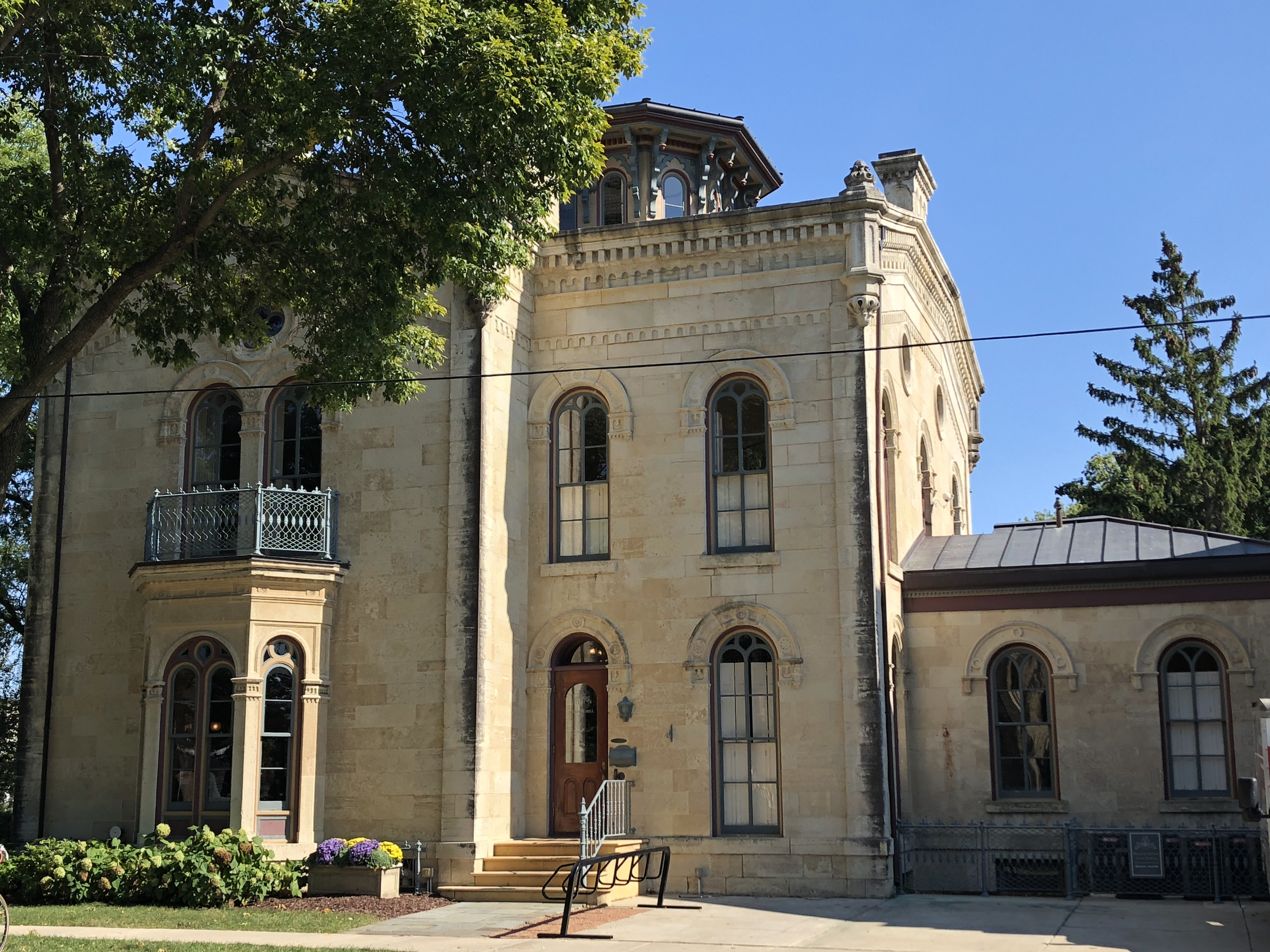
Side door on the northern front of the house to East Gilman Street

The house was completed in 1858. Following Francie and Alexander McDonnell, who had a home office here off the northern side door to East Gilman Street, the house was occupied by Roberta and John H. Garnhart, owner of the Garnhart Reaper Works. After the death of J. H. Garnhart, his widow married Wisconsin Supreme Court Justice Orsamus Cole, and they resided in the house. The next occupant was Sarah Fairchild Dean Conover, the sister of Civil War hero and Wisconsin Governor Lucius Fairchild and herself Madison's leading lady in social circles. (Note: The Wisconsin Historical Society holds a ca. 1895 photo of Sarah Fairchild Dean Conover relaxing at home in the south parlor, ensconced in her art collection.) From 1906 to 1938, Carrie and George Pierce, a power company executive, lived here and ran a high-class boarding house in the mansion. The house was renovated and converted into an apartment building sometime after the Pierce family owned it, enclosing many of the historic features inside the walls and behind newer elements in order to preserve them for future use.

In 1971, the house was designated a landmark by the Madison Landmarks Commission. In 1972 it was added to the National Register of Historic Places, because it is "one of the very best" and the most unique architecturally of the remaining historic houses built in Madison in the decade following statehood. In 1985 the Alexander Company remodeled the house into a luxury hotel, and in 2008 Trek Bicycle and Hospitality bought the hotel and carried out further renovations of the interior.

== Architecture ==
The east-facing façade has an unusual profile for a residence – symmetric around the front door, with a bay on each side rising to a low-pitched gable taller than the center section. Each outer bay has a stone bay window on the first floor with a balcony above in front of large windows. The eclectic building has some elements in Gothic Revival style, such as the pointed arches in some window panes and the quatrefoil windows high in the side gables, and the whole composition may suggest some kind of religious edifice more than a residence.

Some architectural historians have classified the house's style as Romanesque Revival. Others have placed it in the Rundbogenstil category, which means "round arch-style" and is an eclecticizing variation of Romanesque Revival originating in Germany. It is characteristic of this style that many of the windows have round-arched frames within larger arches. At the top of the second story are ranks of fine dentils, also a hallmark of Rundbogenstil. The Italianate belvedere above the center flat bay reflects the style's indebtedness to Tuscan architecture.

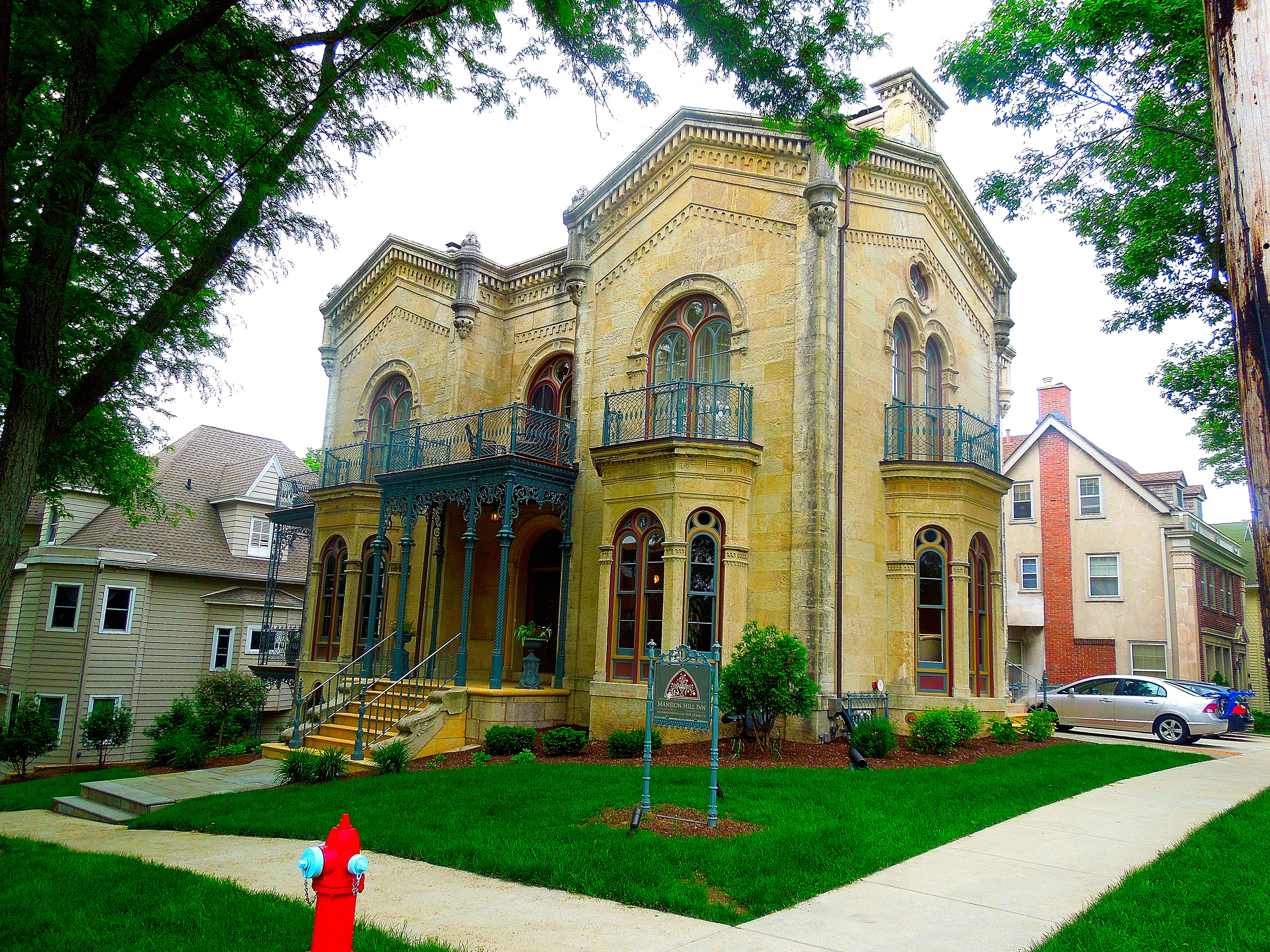
View from the intersection of North Pinckney and East Gilman Streets

The house features sandstone block walls with a side and front gable roof, extruded corner pilasters and corbels, several layers of corbeling below the roofline, Roman arched windows, four-over-four and two-over-two double-hung windows, quatrefoil windows on the side gables, a rooftop belvedere with chamfered corners, featuring a bracketed cornice with dentils and a low-pitch roof, cast iron railings and porches with ornate, intricate designs and slender iron columns, decorative window headers and pilasters trimming the windows, a front door with an arched transom flanked by arched niches and engaged columns, chimneys with dentils and blind arched panels, a three-story cast iron porch on the southern side facade with an iron staircase, one-story bay windows on the first floor below the front and side gables, oxeye windows on the rear gable, a one-story rear ell with a hipped roof, and stone turrets at the corners with decorative bases and caps. The interior features the historic woodwork, doors, wooden floors, Victorian fireplace surrounds, decorative crown moulding, historic light fixtures, a staircase with intact woodwork and an intact banister and balustrade that spirals up through the house’s many levels, terminating in a tall carved wood newel post with an integrated light fixture on the first floor, and a well-preserved octagonal foyer with the original marble floor, crown moulding, plaster medallion at the ceiling chandelier, niches on the chamfered corner walls, and pocket doors.

Noteworthy because it shares builder, designers, and materials with the third State Capitol, this house "may well be the finest domestic example of the German Romanesque Revival remaining in the United States." As an exemplar of Rundbogenstil, it evidences the influence of German culture on the development of the American Midwest.

== See also ==
- National Register of Historic Places listings in Madison, Wisconsin
