= Henry S. Reuss =

American politician

Henry Reuss
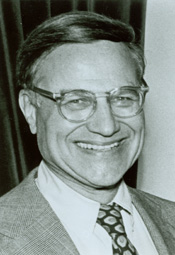

Chair of the House Banking Committee
- In office January 3, 1975 – January 3, 1981
- Preceded by: Wright Patman
- Succeeded by: Fernand St Germain

Member of the U.S. House of Representatives from Wisconsin's 5th district
- In office January 3, 1955 – January 3, 1983
- Preceded by: Charles J. Kersten
- Succeeded by: Jim Moody

Personal details
- Born: Henry Schoellkopf Reuss; February 22, 1912 Milwaukee, Wisconsin, U.S.
- Died: January 12, 2002 (aged 89) San Rafael, California, U.S.
- Party: Republican (Before 1950); Democratic (1950–2002)
- Spouse: Margaret Magrath (m. 1942)
- Children: 4
- Relatives: Henry Schoellkopf (uncle)
- Education: Cornell University (BA); Harvard University (LLB)

Military service
- Allegiance: United States
- Branch/service: United States Army
- Rank: Major
- Battles/wars: World War II
- Awards: Bronze Star

Henry Schoellkopf Reuss (February 22, 1912 – January 12, 2002) was an American politician U.S. Representative from Wisconsin's 5th congressional district from 1955 to 1983. He was a member of the Democratic Party.

== Early life ==
Henry Schoellkopf Reuss was born in Milwaukee, Wisconsin. He was the son of Gustav A. Reuss (pronounced Royce) and Paula Schoellkopf (b. 1876). He was the grandson of a Wisconsin bank president who had emigrated to the United States from Germany in 1848. Both his mother and uncle, Henry Schoellkopf (1879–1912), were grandchildren of Jacob F. Schoellkopf (1819–1899), a pioneer in harnessing the hydroelectric power of Niagara Falls.

Reuss grew up in Milwaukee's German section. Reuss earned his A.B. from Cornell University in 1933 and was a member of the Sphinx Head Society. He then earned his LL.B. from Harvard Law School in 1936.

== Career ==
Reuss was a lawyer in private practice and business executive. He served as assistant corporation counsel for Milwaukee County, Wisconsin from 1939 to 1940 and Counsel for United States Office of Price Administration from 1941 to 1942.

=== World War II ===
Reuss was in the United States Army from 1943 to 1945, leaving as a major. He was awarded the Bronze Star for his service in the infantry. He served as chief of price control, Office of Military Government for Germany in 1945, and deputy general counsel for the Marshall Plan, Paris, France in 1949. After the War, Reuss became a special prosecutor for Milwaukee County in 1950.

=== Political career ===
Reuss was a member of the Republican Party until 1950, when he switched to the Democratic Party. He left the Republican Party due to his antipathy towards Senator Joseph McCarthy. As a Democrat, Reuss waged an unsuccessful primary election campaign to become McCarthy's opponent in the general election for senate in 1952. He attended the 1952 Democratic National Convention as an alternate delegate.

Reuss unsuccessfully ran for mayor of Milwaukee in both 1948 and 1960, finishing as the runner-up in both elections (losing to Frank Zeidler and Henry Maier, respectively).

Reuss served as member of the school board for Milwaukee from 1953 to 1954. He served as member of legal advisory committee, United States National Resources Board from 1948 to 1952.

Reuss was elected as a Democrat from the 5th district to the Eighty-fourth and to the thirteen succeeding Congresses (January 3, 1955 – January 3, 1983). He served as chairman of the Committee on Banking, Currency, and Housing in the Ninety-fourth Congress. He served as chairman of the Committee on Banking, Finance, and Urban Affairs in the Ninety-fifth and Ninety-sixth Congresses. He served as chairman of the Joint Economic Committee in the Ninety-seventh Congress. Among many aides, most key were Donald and Sara Robinson throughout his Congressional career.

Reuss was frequently sought out by the Democratic leadership and candidates to comment on policies and actions of the Nixon and Ford Administrations. That and his chairmanship of the House Government Operations Subcommittee on Conservation & the Environment made him a hero to liberals and progressives.

After the 1974 post-Watergate Democratic landslide victories in Congress, Reuss defeated the more senior Wright Patman of Texas as chairman of the House Banking Committee. He opposed the war in Vietnam, and supported the campaign of U.S. Senator Eugene J. McCarthy for the 1968 Democratic presidential nomination. He served as an at-large delegate for McCarthy at the Democratic National Convention that year.

=== Later career ===
Reuss was not a candidate for reelection to the Ninety-eighth Congress in 1982. After retiring from Congress, he continued to donate to Democratic campaigns, including to Senator Russ Feingold's and Paul Tsongas's campaigns in 1992. Mrs. Reuss was also an active donor to Democrats and related groups.

== Personal life ==
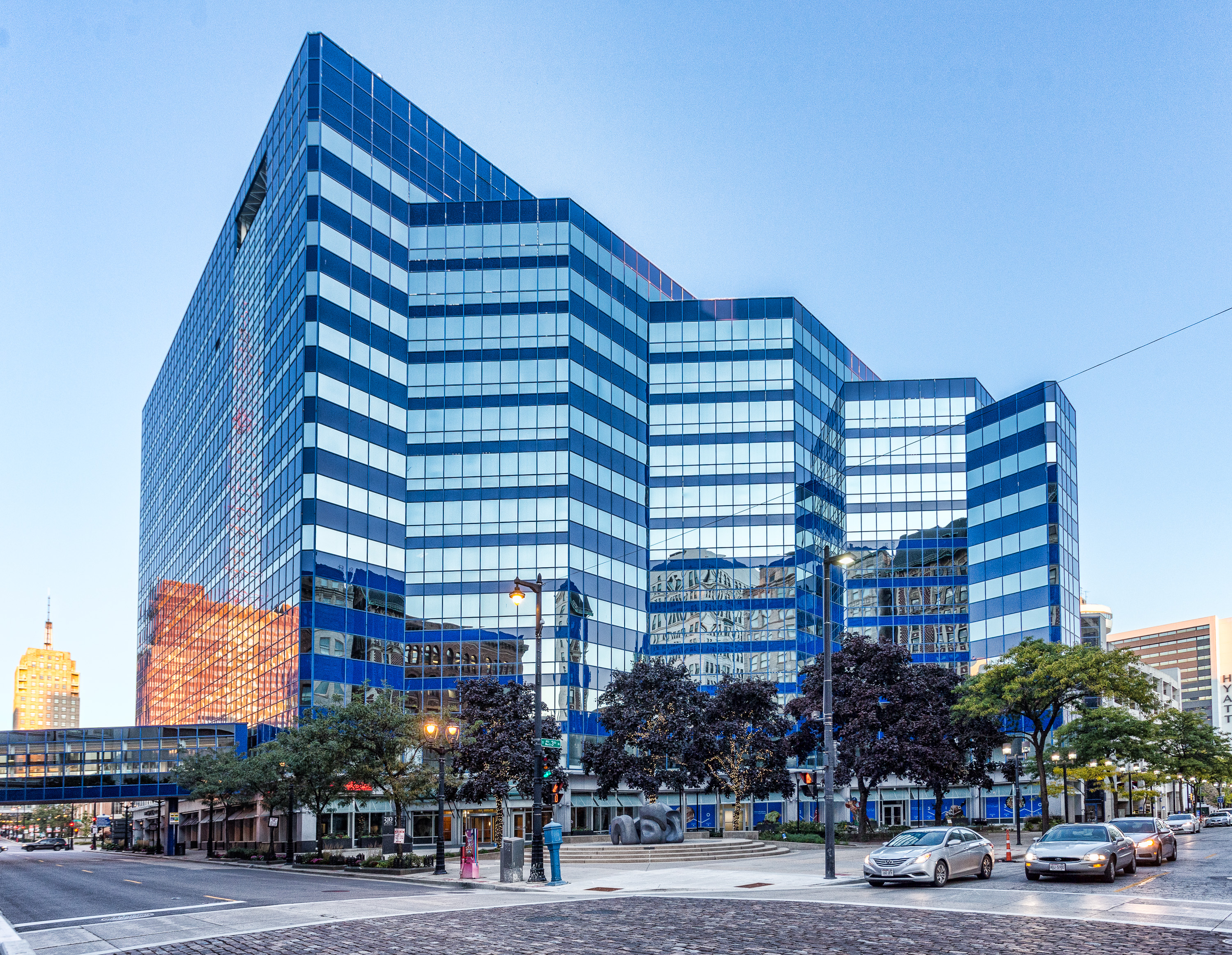
The former Reuss Federal Plaza in Milwaukee

In 1942, he married Margaret Magrath (c. 1920–2008). She was an alumna of Bryn Mawr College who earned a master's degree from the University of Chicago in 1944, and a Ph.D. from George Washington University in 1968, both in economics. She worked at the Office of Price Administration in the 1940s, and taught at Federal City College from 1970. FCC was part of the merger to create the University of the District of Columbia in 1977, and she continued teaching there until she retired in 1985, as department chairman. She served mayor Marion Barry in several capacities, supported the Community for Creative Non-Violence, Emily's List, and various Democrats. They had four children, seven grandchildren, and eight great-grandchildren.

In retirement, Mr. and Mrs. Reuss spent much time living in the "unknown south of France," the titular subject of a 1991 piece they wrote together for Harvard History Buff's Guide.

=== Legacy ===
For 20 years, beginning in 1983, a 14-story office building in Milwaukee was named Reuss Federal Plaza (It was later called The Blue and since 2019, 310W). The National Park Service's Henry Reuss Ice Age Center is located near Dundee, Wisconsin.

Party political offices
| Preceded by Thomas E. Fairchild | Democratic nominee for Attorney General of Wisconsin; 1950 | Succeeded by Elliot Walstead |
U.S. House of Representatives
| Preceded by Charles J. Kersten | Member of the U.S. House of Representatives from Wisconsin's 5th congressional district 1955–1983 | Succeeded by Jim Moody |
| Preceded by Wright Patman | Chair of the House Banking Committee; 1975–1981 | Succeeded by Fernand St Germain |
