= 1966 Wisconsin Supreme Court election =

- April 5, 1966
Candidate	Thomas E. Fairchild
Popular vote	564,132
Percentage	100%
Justice before election
Thomas E. Fairchild
Elected Justice
Thomas E. Fairchild

The 1966 Wisconsin Supreme Court election was held on Tuesday, April 5, 1966 to elect a justice to a full ten-year seat the Wisconsin Supreme Court. Incumbent justice Thomas E. Fairchild was re-elected to a second term, unopposed.

Prior to the election, there had been some concern that Fairchild might face a competitive challenge, as he had authored the majority opinion in the 1964 McCauley vs. Tropic of Cancer obscenity case. Public displeasure with this opinion had been at significant controversy in the court's competitive 1964 election, and had also been a matter of controversy in the 1965 election. However, Fairchild ultimately went without facing any challenger.

== Result ==
1966 Wisconsin Supreme Court election
Party	Candidate	Votes	%
General election (April 5, 1966)
Nonpartisan	Thomas E. Fairchild (incumbent)	564,132	100
Total votes		564,132	100
