= Orsamus Cole =

American politician and judge (1819–1903)

The Honorable Orsamus R. Cole
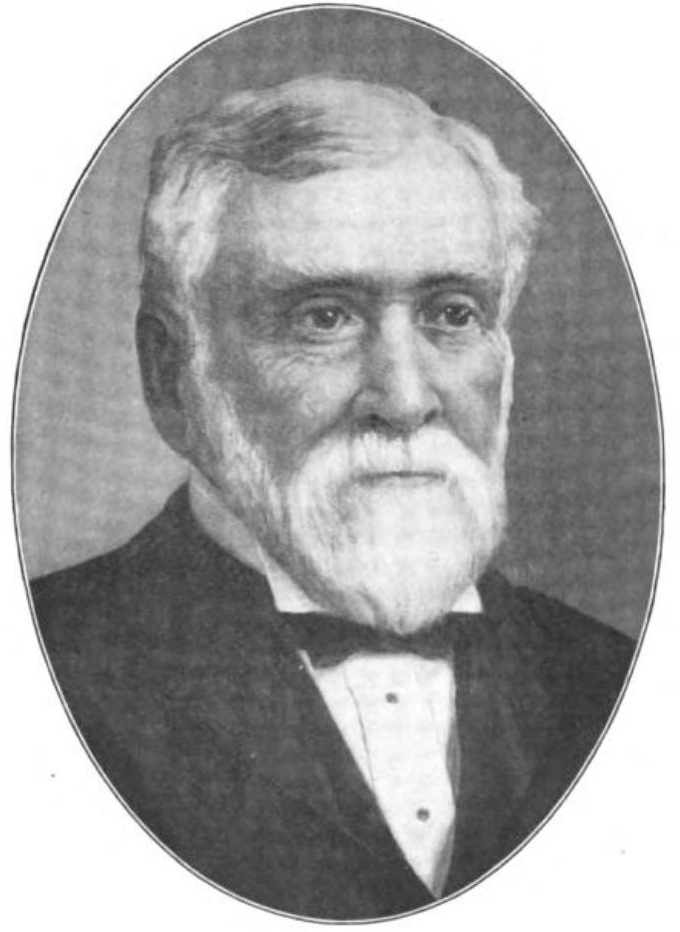

6th Chief Justice of the Wisconsin Supreme Court
- In office November 11, 1880 – January 4, 1892
- Appointed by: William E. Smith
- Preceded by: Edward George Ryan
- Succeeded by: William P. Lyon

Justice of the Wisconsin Supreme Court
- In office June 1, 1855 – January 4, 1892
- Preceded by: Samuel Crawford
- Succeeded by: Silas U. Pinney (Note: on November 11, 1880, when Cole was promoted to fill the chief justice seat, his former (associate) justice seat was filled by John B. Cassoday. At the time, the chief justice occupied a distinct seat on the court. A state constitutional amendment ratified in 1889 changed the court's selection of chief justice to a seniority system and converted Cole's seat (after the expiration of his term) into a justice seat no different from any other (rather than a separate chief justice seat). In 1892, Pinney succeeded Cole in holding his ultimate seat on the court. Due to the change in chief justice selection meant that Pinney was not automatically chief justice (unlike prior occupants of that seat))

Member of the U.S. House of Representatives from Wisconsin's 2nd district
- In office March 4, 1849 – March 3, 1851
- Preceded by: Mason C. Darling
- Succeeded by: Ben C. Eastman

Personal details
- Born: August 23, 1819 Cazenovia, New York, US
- Died: May 5, 1903 (aged 83) Milwaukee, Wisconsin, US
- Resting place: Forest Hill Cemetery; Madison, Wisconsin
- Party: Republican; Whig (before 1855)
- Spouses: Julia A. Houghton (m. 1848; died 1874); Roberta C. Noe Garnhart (m. 1879; died 1884)
- Children: Sidney H. Cole; Orsamus Cole
- Parents: Hymeneus Cole (father); Sarah Salisbury (mother)
- Education: Union College
- Profession: Lawyer

Orsamus R. Cole (August 23, 1819 – May 5, 1903) was an American lawyer, judge, and Wisconsin pioneer. He served as the 6th chief justice of the Wisconsin Supreme Court, and, until 2013, was the longest-serving justice in the Court's history, with nearly 37 years on the high court (1855–1892). He also represented Wisconsin's 2nd congressional district in the U.S. House of Representatives for the 31st Congress (1849–1851). Before Wisconsin's statehood, Cole served as a delegate to the constitutional convention which drafted the Constitution of Wisconsin. His name is frequently misspelled as "Orasmus".

== Early life and career ==
Orsamus Cole was born in Cazenovia, New York, the son of Hymeneus Cole and Sarah Salisbury. Both of his grandfathers had served in the American Revolutionary War. Cole attended the common schools and graduated from Union College, Schenectady, New York, in 1843. He studied law, and, in 1845, he was admitted to the New York bar. That same year, after a brief stop in Chicago, he moved to Potosi, a lead mining town in Grant County, Wisconsin Territory. At Potosi, he entered a prosperous law practice partnership with William Biddlecome.

== Political office ==
In 1847, he was chosen as one of Grant County's delegates to the 2nd Wisconsin Constitutional Convention. The constitution was ratified by a referendum in May 1848, and, that fall, Orsamus was nominated by the Whig Party as their candidate for Congress in Wisconsin's 2nd congressional district. In the November general election, Cole defeated his opponents, Democrat A. Hyatt Smith and Free Soil candidate George W. Crabb, and earned a seat in the 31st United States Congress.

In Congress, Cole sided with the anti-slavery Whigs and refused to support the fugitive slave provisions of the Compromise of 1850. He ran for re-election in 1850, but was defeated by Democrat Ben C. Eastman.

He resumed the practice of law in Potosi, but, in 1853, stood on the consolidated Whig and Free Soil ticket as their candidate for Attorney General of Wisconsin. The Whig and Free Soil ticket was defeated in nearly all of the statewide races that year, and Cole again returned to his law practice.

== Supreme Court ==
Following their defeat in 1853, Whig and Free Soil remnants went on to form the new Republican Party. In the 1854 elections, the new Republican Party was very successful and captured a majority of the Wisconsin State Assembly. That winter, they selected Cole to be their candidate against incumbent Associate Justice Samuel Crawford in the April 1855 Supreme Court election.

Cole defeated Crawford, largely because of his opposition to the fugitive slave laws, and took office the following June. He was re-elected to six-year terms in 1861, 1867, 1873, and was then re-elected to ten-year term in 1879. In November 1880, Cole was appointed by Governor William E. Smith to fill the vacant Chief Justice role created by the death of Justice Edward George Ryan. He was elected to a full ten-year term as chief justice in April 1881.

Justice Cole served thirty six years and seven months on the Wisconsin Supreme Court, and was the longest-serving justice in the history of that court until he was surpassed by Chief Justice Shirley Abrahamson in 2013.

At the end of his term in 1892, he retired to Milwaukee, Wisconsin, where he died on May 5, 1903. He was interred in Forest Hill Cemetery, in Madison, Wisconsin.

== Personal life and family ==
He married his first wife Julia A. Houghton in 1848. They had two children, Sidney, who lived to adulthood, and Orsamus, who died as an infant in 1853. Julia died in 1874. He married his second wife, Roberta C. Noe Garnhart, the widow of John H. Garnhart, on January 1, 1879, at Madison, Wisconsin. She died June 17, 1884.

His former home, now known as the Carrie Pierce House, is listed on the National Register of Historic Places.

== Electoral history ==
=== U.S. House of Representatives (1848, 1850) ===
Wisconsin's 2nd Congressional District Election, 1848
| Party | Candidate | Votes | % | ±% |
|---|---|---|---|---|
General Election
| Whig | Orsamus Cole | 6,281 | 45.23% | |
| Democratic | A. Hyatt Smith | 5,690 | 40.97% | |
| Free Soil | George W. Crabb | 1,916 | 13.80% | |
| Plurality | | 591 | 4.26% | |
| Total votes | | 13,887 | 100.0% | |
| Whig gain from Democratic | | | | |

Wisconsin's 2nd Congressional District Election, 1850
| Party | Candidate | Votes | % | ±% |
|---|---|---|---|---|
General Election (partial returns)
| Democratic | Ben C. Eastman | 7,262 | 55.38% | |
| Whig | Orsamus Cole | 5,852 | 44.62% | |
| Plurality | | 1,410 | 10.75% | +6.50% |
| Total votes | | 13,114 | 100.0% | -5.57% |
| Democratic gain from Whig | | Swing | 15.01% | |

=== Wisconsin Attorney General (1853) ===
1853 Wisconsin Attorney General election
| Party | Candidate | Votes | % | ±% |
|---|---|---|---|---|
General Election
| Democratic | George Baldwin Smith | 31,705 | 57.15% | |
| Whig | Orsamus Cole | 23,776 | 42.85% | |
| Plurality | | 7,929 | 14.29% | |
| Total votes | | 55,481 | 100.0% | |
| Democratic hold | | | | |

=== Wisconsin Supreme Court (1855) ===
1855 Wisconsin Supreme Court election
| Party | Candidate | Votes | % | ±% |
|---|---|---|---|---|
General Election, April 3, 1855
| Nonpartisan | Orsamus Cole | 32,881 | 55.95% | |
| Nonpartisan | Samuel Crawford (incumbent) | 25,733 | 43.79% | |
| Nonpartisan | James H. Knowlton (Write-in) | 64 | 0.11% | |
| | Scattering | 90 | 0.15% | |
| Plurality | | 7,148 | 12.16% | |
| Total votes | | 58,768 | 100.0% | |

== Notes ==
Party political offices
| Preceded by John C. Truesdell | Whig nominee for Attorney General of Wisconsin; 1853 | Party disbanded |
U.S. House of Representatives
| Preceded by Mason C. Darling | Member of the U.S. House of Representatives from Wisconsin's 2nd congressional district 1849 – 1851 | Succeeded by Ben C. Eastman |
Legal offices
| Preceded by Samuel Crawford | Justice of the Wisconsin Supreme Court; 1855 – 1892 | Succeeded by Silas U. Pinney |
| Preceded by Edward George Ryan | Chief Justice of the Wisconsin Supreme Court; 1880 – 1892 | Succeeded by William P. Lyon |
