= Robert W. Hansen =

American judge, former justice of the Wisconsin Supreme Court

The Honorable Robert W. Hansen
- portrait photograph, as justice in the 1960s

Justice of the Wisconsin Supreme Court
- In office August 1, 1967 – July 31, 1977
- Preceded by: George R. Currie
- Succeeded by: William G. Callow

Wisconsin Circuit Court Judge for the 2nd Circuit, Branch 13
- In office January 2, 1961 – August 1, 1967
- Preceded by: Position created
- Succeeded by: Maurice Spracker

Personal details
- Born: Robert Wayne Hansen; April 29, 1911 Milwaukee, Wisconsin, U.S.
- Died: June 9, 1997 (aged 86) Okauchee Lake, Wisconsin, U.S.
- Spouse: Dorothy (m. 1941–1997)
- Children: Karen (Schaf); John; Susan; James
- Education: Marquette University Law School (JD)

Robert Wayne Hansen (April 29, 1911 – June 9, 1997) was an American lawyer and jurist, and was a justice of the Wisconsin Supreme Court.

== Early life ==
Born in Milwaukee, Wisconsin, Hansen graduated from Marquette University Law School in 1933. He was a devoted member of the Fraternal Order of Eagles, and served as the order's National President and editor of the order's national magazine.

In 1951, Hansen became chief examiner of the Milwaukee Board of Fire and Police Commissioners, and served in that role until he was appointed to the Milwaukee County District Court in 1954, by Governor Walter J. Kohler, Jr. He was elected in 1960 to the newly created 13th Milwaukee county branch of the 2nd Circuit of Wisconsin Courts, defeating Irene Gyzinski. The 13th branch was created as the family court division in Milwaukee county. He served from 1961 to 1968, winning re-election 1965 without opposition.

== Wisconsin Supreme Court ==
In 1967, he was elected to the Wisconsin Supreme Court, defeating the incumbent Chief Justice, George R. Currie. It was the first time that a sitting Wisconsin Chief Justice had been defeated for re-election. During the campaign, Hansen had pointed out that even if Currie had been re-elected, he would have to retire after two years due to the mandatory retirement law that was then in-effect for Wisconsin judges. Hansen served his ten-year term and did not seek re-election in 1977, noting that the same mandatory retirement law would impact him in only a few years if he were re-elected. His term ended July 31, 1977.

Hansen was an ideological conservative.

== Later years ==
Hansen and his wife Dorothy had four children. Justice Hansen died June 9, 1997.

== Electoral history ==
=== Wisconsin Circuit Court (1960, 1965) ===
Wisconsin Circuit Court, 2nd Circuit, Branch 13 Election, 1960
Party	Candidate	Votes	%	±%
Independent	Robert W. Hansen	220,095	79.08%	
Independent	Irene F. Gyzinski	58,231	20.92%	
Total votes		'278,326'	'100.0%'	

Wisconsin Circuit Court, 2nd Circuit, Branch 13 Election, 1965
Party	Candidate	Votes	%	±%
Independent	Robert W. Hansen (incumbent)	104,455	100.0%	
Total votes		'104,455'	'100.0%'	

=== Wisconsin Supreme Court (1967) ===
1967 Wisconsin Supreme Court election
Party	Candidate	Votes	%	±%
Independent	Robert W. Hansen	479,117	55.94%	
Independent	George R. Currie (incumbent)	377,426	44.06%	
Total votes		856,543	100.0%	
