= 1952 United States Senate election in Wisconsin =

- November 4, 1952

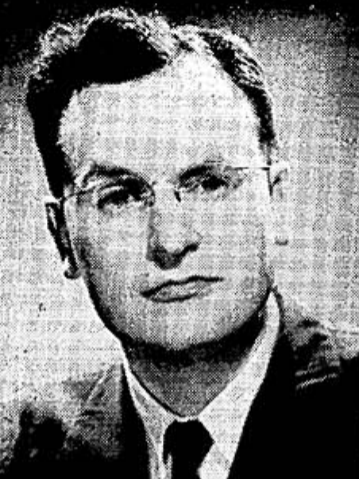
Nominee	Joseph McCarthy	Thomas E. Fairchild
Party	Republican	Democratic
Popular vote	870,444	731,402
Percentage	54.23%	45.57%
- County results McCarthy: 50–60% 60–70% 70–80% 80–90% Fairfield: 50–60% 60–70%
U.S. senator before election
Joseph McCarthy
Republican
Elected U.S. Senator
Joseph McCarthy
Republican

The 1952 United States Senate election in Wisconsin was held on November 4, 1952.

Incumbent Senator Joseph McCarthy was elected to a second term in office over Democrat Thomas E. Fairchild. McCarthy did not complete his term; he died on May 2, 1957, and was succeeded by William Proxmire in a special election.

As of 2024, this is the last time that a Republican has won the Class 1 Senate seat in Wisconsin. This is also the last time Portage County went Republican in the Class 1 Senate seat in Wisconsin.

== Republican primary ==
=== Candidates ===
- Edward J. Finan
- Andrew G. Jacobson
- Edmund Kerwer
- Joseph McCarthy, incumbent senator since 1947
- Leonard Schmitt, attorney and candidate for governor in 1950
- Perry J. Stearns, candidate for Senate in 1944 and 1946

=== Results ===
1952 Republican U.S. Senate primary
Party	Candidate	Votes	%
Republican	Joseph McCarthy (incumbent)	515,481	67.89%
Republican	Leonard Schmitt	213,701	28.15%
Republican	Andrew G. Jacobson	11,639	1.53%
Republican	Perry J. Stearns	10,353	1.36%
Republican	Edmund Kerwer	4,078	0.54%
Republican	Edward J. Finan	4,021	0.53%
Total votes		759,273	100.00%

== Democratic primary ==
=== Candidates ===
- Thomas E. Fairchild, U.S. Attorney for the Western District of Wisconsin, former Wisconsin attorney general, and nominee for governor in 1950
- Henry S. Reuss, Milwaukee County prosecutor and former anti-McCarthy Republican

=== Results ===
1952 Democratic U.S. Senate primary
Party	Candidate	Votes	%
Democratic	Thomas E. Fairchild	97,321	50.77%
Democratic	Henry S. Reuss	94,379	49.23%
Total votes		191,700	100.00%

== General election ==
=== Candidates ===
- James E. Boulton (Socialist Labor)
- Alfred L. Easterday (Honest Government)
- Thomas E. Fairchild, U.S. Attorney for the Western District of Wisconsin (Democratic)
- Joseph McCarthy, incumbent senator since 1947 (Republican)

=== Results ===
1952 U.S. Senate election in Wisconsin
Party	Candidate	Votes	%	±%
Republican	Joseph McCarthy (incumbent)	870,444	54.23%	▼7.05
Democratic	Thomas E. Fairchild	731,402	45.57%	▲8.16
Independent	Alfred L. Easterday	1,879	0.12%	N/A
Socialist Workers	James E. Boulton	1,442	0.09%	N/A
Total votes		1,605,167	100.00%	
Republican hold				

The 1952 race was much closer than McCarthy's 1946 victory, and he trailed Republican presidential candidate Dwight D. Eisenhower by around 100,000 votes in the state.

== See also ==
- 1952 United States Senate elections
- McCarthyism
