= Roland J. Steinle =

American judge

The Honorable Roland J. Steinle
- portrait photograph, circa 1954

Justice of the Wisconsin Supreme Court
- In office January 1, 1954 – March 2, 1958
- Appointed by: Walter J. Kohler Jr.
- Preceded by: Oscar M. Fritz
- Succeeded by: E. Harold Hallows

Wisconsin Circuit Court Judge for the 2nd Circuit, Branch 3
- In office January 2, 1940 – December 31, 1953
- Appointed by: Julius P. Heil
- Preceded by: John J. Gregory
- Succeeded by: Elmer W. Roller

Personal details
- Born: March 21, 1896 Milwaukee, Wisconsin, U.S.
- Died: December 22, 1966 (aged 70)
- Resting place: Calvary Cemetery, Milwaukee, Wisconsin
- Party: Republican
- Spouse: Helen Lucille Sharpe (died 1953)
- Children: Roland J. Steinle Jr.
- Education: Marquette Law School
- Profession: lawyer, judge

Military service
- Allegiance: United States
- Branch/service: United States Army
- Rank: 1st Lieutenant
- Battles/wars: World War I

Roland Joseph Steinle (March 21, 1896 – December 22, 1966) was an American lawyer, jurist, and Republican politician from the U.S. state of Wisconsin. He served four years on the Wisconsin Supreme Court and was the Republican nominee for United States Senator from Wisconsin in the 1958 election.

== Biography ==
Born in Milwaukee, Wisconsin, Steinle served in the United States Army during World War I. He graduated from Marquette Law School, was in private law practice, and served as a special district attorney. Steinle was appointed a Wisconsin circuit court judge in 1940 and was appointed to the Wisconsin Supreme Court in 1954. In 1958, he abruptly resigned from the court to run for election to the United States Senate as a Republican. After losing the election to William Proxmire, Steinle returned to private practice and served as a circuit court commissioner.

== Electoral history ==
=== Lieutenant Governor of Wisconsin (1936) ===
1936 Wisconsin lieutenant gubernatorial election
| Party | Candidate | Votes | % | ±% |
|---|---|---|---|---|
General Election, November 7, 1936
| Progressive | Henry Gunderson | 465,918 | 41.69% | +6.44% |
| Republican | Roland J. Steinle | 355,340 | 31.79% | +9.72% |
| Democratic | Edward Gervais | 289,964 | 25.95% | −10.33% |
| Socialist Labor | Alfred Potter | 3,882 | 0.35% | +0.30% |
| Prohibition | Vernon T. Groves | 2,496 | 0.22% | +0.10% |
| Plurality | | 110,578 | 9.89% | -8.86% |
| Total votes | | 1,117,600 | 100.0% | +25.57% |
| Progressive gain from Democratic | | | | |

=== Wisconsin Circuit Court (1940) ===
Wisconsin Circuit Court, 2nd Circuit, Branch 3 Election, 1940
| Party | Candidate | Votes | % | ±% |
|---|---|---|---|---|
General Election, April 5, 1940
| Nonpartisan | Roland J. Steinle (incumbent) | 131,959 | 50.15% | |
| Nonpartisan | Leonard C. Fons | 131,190 | 49.85% | |
| Plurality | | 769 | 0.29% | |
| Total votes | | 263,149 | 100.0% | |

=== Wisconsin Supreme Court (1954) ===
1954 Wisconsin Supreme Court election
| Party | Candidate | Votes | % | ±% |
|---|---|---|---|---|
Nonpartisan Primary, March 9, 1954
| Nonpartisan | Roland J. Steinle (incumbent) | 125,530 | 61.74% | |
| Nonpartisan | William H. Dieterich | 49,669 | 24.43% | |
| Nonpartisan | Perry J. Stearns | 28,134 | 13.84% | |
| Total votes | | 203,333 | 100.0% | |
General Election, April 6, 1954
| Nonpartisan | Roland J. Steinle (incumbent) | 297,369 | 59.76% | |
| Nonpartisan | William H. Dieterich | 200,224 | 40.24% | |
| Plurality | | 97,145 | 19.52% | |
| Total votes | | 497,593 | 100.0% | |

=== U.S. Senate (1958) ===
1958 United States Senate election in Wisconsin
| Party | Candidate | Votes | % | ±% |
|---|---|---|---|---|
General Election, November 4, 1958
| Democratic | William Proxmire (incumbent) | 682,440 | 57.13% | +0.69% |
| Republican | Roland J. Steinle | 510,398 | 42.73% | +2.22% |
| Socialist Workers | James E. Boulton | 1,226 | 0.10% | |
| Socialist Labor | Georgia Cozzini | 537 | 0.04% | −0.05% |
| Plurality | | 172,042 | 14.40% | -1.53% |
| Total votes | | 1,194,601 | 100.0% | +54.64% |
| Democratic hold | | | | |

Party political offices
| Preceded by Waldemar C. Wehe | Republican nominee for Lieutenant Governor of Wisconsin; 1936 | Succeeded by Walter Samuel Goodland |
| Preceded by Walter J. Kohler Jr. | Republican nominee for U.S. Senator from Wisconsin (Class 1); 1958 | Succeeded by Wilbur N. Renk |
Legal offices
| Preceded by John J. Gregory | Wisconsin Circuit Court Judge for the 2nd Circuit, Branch 3 January 2, 1940 – December 31, 1953 | Succeeded by Elmer W. Roller |
| Preceded by Oscar M. Fritz | Justice of the Wisconsin Supreme Court; January 1, 1954 – March 2, 1958 | Succeeded by E. Harold Hallows |
