= Thomas E. Fairchild =

American judge (1912 – 2007)

Thomas Fairchild
- portrait photograph, as Wisconsin State Supreme Court justice

Senior Judge of the United States Court of Appeals for the Seventh Circuit
- In office August 31, 1981 – February 12, 2007

Chief Judge of the United States Court of Appeals for the Seventh Circuit
- In office 1975–1981
- Preceded by: Luther Merritt Swygert
- Succeeded by: Walter Cummings

Judge of the United States Court of Appeals for the Seventh Circuit
- In office August 11, 1966 – August 31, 1981
- Appointed by: Lyndon B. Johnson
- Preceded by: F. Ryan Duffy
- Succeeded by: John Louis Coffey

Justice of the Wisconsin Supreme Court
- In office January 1, 1957 – August 11, 1966
- Preceded by: Edward Fairchild
- Succeeded by: Leo B. Hanley

United States Attorney for the Western District of Wisconsin
- In office March 20, 1951 – July 8, 1952
- President: Harry S. Truman
- Preceded by: Charles Cashin
- Succeeded by: Frank Nikolay

31st Attorney General of Wisconsin
- In office November 12, 1948 – January 1, 1951
- Governor: Oscar Rennebohm
- Preceded by: Grover L. Broadfoot
- Succeeded by: Vernon W. Thomson

Personal details
- Born: Thomas Edward Fairchild; December 25, 1912 Milwaukee, Wisconsin, U.S.
- Died: February 12, 2007 (aged 94) Madison, Wisconsin, U.S.
- Party: Democratic
- Spouse: Eleanor Dahl (Deceased 2005)
- Children: 4
- Relatives: Edward Fairchild (father)
- Education: Deep Springs College; Cornell University (BA); University of Wisconsin, Madison (LLB)

Thomas Edward Fairchild (December 25, 1912 – February 12, 2007) was an American lawyer and judge. He served forty years as a judge of the United States Court of Appeals for the Seventh Circuit. Earlier in his career he was a justice of the Wisconsin Supreme Court, United States Attorney for the Western District of Wisconsin, and the 31st attorney general of Wisconsin.

== Early life and career ==
Born on December 25, 1912, in Milwaukee, Wisconsin, Fairchild was the son of Edward T. Fairchild, who would serve on the Wisconsin Supreme Court from 1930 through 1957, and was chief justice for the last 3 years of his tenure.

Fairchild graduated from Riverside High School in 1929. He obtained a B.A. degree from Cornell University in 1934, and a Bachelor of Laws in 1938 from the University of Wisconsin Law School.

In 1938, he entered private practice in Portage, Wisconsin, partnering with Daniel H. Grady. In 1941, he was appointed a hearing commissioner for the Office of Price Administration in Chicago, Illinois, and Milwaukee, serving from 1941 to 1945. He returned to private practice in Milwaukee from 1945 to 1948.

== Political career ==
In 1948, Fairchild became involved in a project to revitalize the Democratic Party in the state of Wisconsin. At the time, Republicans had dominated state elections for the previous fifty years. That year, Fairchild ran for Attorney General of Wisconsin. The incumbent, Grover L. Broadfoot, was defeated in the Republican primary. He had been appointed to the position to fill the unexpired term of John E. Martin, who had resigned to accept appointment to the Wisconsin Supreme Court.

=== Attorney General ===
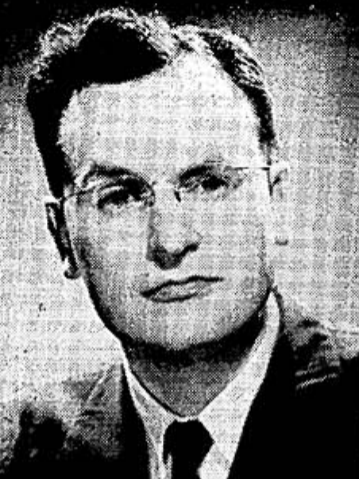
portrait photograph of Fairchild

Fairchild's Republican opponent in the election was Don Martin, who benefited from having the same last name as the previous five-term Attorney General John E. Martin. Martin, however, did dispel some of that confusion when he was charged with public intoxication for an incident in which he urinated on a bank teller window in downtown Madison in broad daylight. Fairchild went on to win the election, but he was the only Democrat to win state-wide office that year. After the election, the incumbent, Grover Broadfoot, who was only serving on an appointed basis, resigned. This cleared the way for Fairchild to be appointed to begin his term two months early.

As Attorney General, Fairchild was seen as pursuing policy that he believed in despite political consequences. He fought for expansion of civil rights and equal protection under law. Wisconsin did not have segregation laws like those that existed in the south at this time—in fact, Wisconsin had laws prohibiting the denial of equal enjoyment of public facilities—but there were still de facto segregation behaviors that Fairchild sought to challenge in the state. For instance, the situation of the two public pools in Beloit, Wisconsin, where Fairchild brought a suit against the City Manager, A. D. Telfer, for the apparent segregation of those public facilities. Fairchild dismissed the suit after securing sworn testimony from Telfer that African Americans would be welcomed at either public pool.

Fairchild boldly used his authority in other politically sensitive areas as well. He issued an opinion finding that a then-popular Baseball tally card which awarded prizes based on scores was a form of illegal gambling; he asserted the right of the state government to set standards for counties administering benefits funded jointly by the state and federal government, where many counties were currently not meeting the standards; he supported Socialist Milwaukee Mayor Frank Zeidler's rent control rules; he opined that public school release for religious instruction of Catholic students was a violation of the Constitution of Wisconsin. His most controversial decision, however, was his opinion finding that several radio and television programs which gave away prizes to the audience constituted a form of illegal gambling.

=== Federal office ===
In 1950, rather than running for re-election as Attorney General, Fairchild chose to challenge incumbent Republican United States Senator Alexander Wiley, who was seeking a third term. He narrowly won the Democratic party's nomination, fending off Milwaukee Mayor Daniel Hoan, labor pick William Sanderson, and former United States Congressman LaVern Dilweg, who also happened to be a famous retired athlete who won three championships with the Green Bay Packers. Fairchild ran on a liberal platform that endorsed Harry Truman's Fair Deal, advocating for expansion of Social Security to supplement or replace medical insurance and for the fair redistribution of income to prevent concentration of wealth in the hands of a small group of elites. He also took an early stand against Wisconsin's junior senator, Joseph McCarthy, who had, that year, begun making accusations of communist infiltration of the United States government. Fairchild said that McCarthy brought "shame to Wisconsin."

Despite his vigorous campaigning, Fairchild was defeated by the incumbent, Alexander Wiley, by about 80,000 votes. Nevertheless, his campaign had been noticed, and, in 1951, he was nominated by President Truman to become United States Attorney for the Western District of Wisconsin. His opponent in 1950, Alexander Wiley, wrote a statement endorsing his nomination and he was confirmed by the Senate in March 1951. He served briefly as a consultant for the Office of Price Stabilization in 1951 before his confirmation as U.S. Attorney.

In 1952, it was a priority of the Democratic Party of Wisconsin to defeat Senator Joseph McCarthy. Several prominent Democrats considered running, including Gaylord Nelson, Jim Doyle Sr., and Henry S. Reuss. Nelson and Doyle eventually bowed out of the contest in 1951, leaving Reuss, a previously unsuccessful candidate for Milwaukee Mayor and Wisconsin Attorney General. A "Draft Fairchild" movement began among Wisconsin Democrats and, in July 1952, Fairchild bowed to pressure and resigned as U.S. Attorney to enter the U.S. Senate primary. Reuss and Fairchild remained focused through the primary on campaigning against McCarthy, and, after a close race, Fairchild was chosen as the Democratic nominee.

The campaign to defeat McCarthy became a focus of attention from the national Democratic Party, as presidential candidate Adlai Stevenson and U.S. Senator Estes Kefauver visited the state to bolster Fairchild. Fairchild's was one of the first Wisconsin campaigns to receive large contributions from out-of-state and one of the first to feature large scale radio and television advertisement. Though Fairchild was considered soft-spoken, he was deeply critical of McCarthy's behavior in the Senate. He said of McCarthy's tactics: "When we destroy a man's character, we take away from his dignity of soul. We take from him something that money cannot buy, something which may never be regained. When we stop and examine this spectacle, it revolts us." Making up for Fairchild's lack of bombast, McCarthy was dogged by a Democratic "Truth Squad", composed of Gaylord Nelson, Jim Doyle Sr., and Henry Reuss, as well as Carl W. Thompson, Horace W. Wilkie, Miles McMillan, and Democratic gubernatorial candidate William Proxmire.

Despite diligent campaigning, strong Democratic support, and many Republican crossover votes, Fairchild was defeated by McCarthy. McCarthy went onto his consequential second term, which saw him chair the Senate Government Affairs Committee and reach the height of his power.

Fairchild returned to private law practice, forming a partnership with Floyd Kops and Irv Charne in Milwaukee. During this time, however, he remained active in public affairs and represented several Wisconsin citizens subpoenaed to testify before the House Un-American Activities Committee.

== Wisconsin Supreme Court ==
In 1956, his father Edward, who was then Chief Justice of the Wisconsin Supreme Court, decided that he would retire at the end of his term in January, 1957. Thomas Fairchild decided that he would run for the open seat. In the Spring election, Fairchild won a commanding victory over William H. Dieterich and Clair L. Finch in the primary, with an even larger majority over Dieterich in the general election, taking over 77% of the vote. He took office in January 1957, and was sworn in by his father. He was re-elected without opposition in 1966, but would resign later that year to accept his seat on the United States Court of Appeals.

During his tenure on the Supreme Court, he was chair of the 1960 and 1963 Governor's commissions on constitutional revision.

== Federal judicial service ==
Fairchild was nominated by President Lyndon B. Johnson on July 11, 1966, to a seat on the United States Court of Appeals for the Seventh Circuit vacated by Judge F. Ryan Duffy. He was confirmed by the United States Senate on August 10, 1966, and received his commission on August 11, 1966. He served as Chief Judge and as a member of the Judicial Conference of the United States from 1975 to 1981. He assumed senior status on August 31, 1981. His service terminated on February 12, 2007, due to his death.

== Personal life and family ==
Fairchild's father was Chief Justice Edward T. Fairchild. He met his future wife, Eleanor Dahl, when they were both students at the University of Wisconsin. They were married in 1937 at Lowell, Indiana, where Eleanor had grown up. Eleanor was active in supporting all of her husband's campaigns, but was especially active in the 1952 campaign against Joseph McCarthy. They had four children together.

Fairchild died on February 12, 2007, in Madison, Wisconsin. He was 94 years old.

== Electoral history ==
=== Wisconsin Attorney General (1948) ===
1948 Wisconsin Attorney General election
Party	Candidate	Votes	%	±%
Primary Election, September 21, 1948
Republican	Donald J. Martin	154,128	36.75%	
Republican	William H. Dieterich	104,187	24.84%	
Democratic	Thomas E. Fairchild	97,435	23.23%	
Republican	Frank X. Didier	27,316	6.51%	
Republican	Grover L. Broadfoot (incumbent)	26,572	6.34%	
Progressive	Michael Essin	6,180	1.47%	
Socialist	Anna Mae Davis	3,606	0.86%	
Total votes		'419,424'	'100.0%'	
General Election, November 2, 1948
Democratic	Thomas E. Fairchild	622,312	50.67%	+21.96%
Republican	Donald J. Martin	583,298	47.49%	−22.47%
Progressive	Michael Essin	11,908	0.97%	
Socialist	Anna Mae Davis	10,641	0.87%	−0.46%
Total votes		'1,228,159'	'100.0%'	+25.88%
Democratic gain from Republican				

=== U.S. Senate (1950, 1952) ===
United States Senate Election in Wisconsin, 1950
Party	Candidate	Votes	%	±%
Primary Election, September 19, 1950
Republican	Alexander Wiley (incumbent)	308,536	54.62%	
Republican	Edward J. Finan	87,929	15.57%	
Democratic	Thomas E. Fairchild	58,399	10.34%	
Democratic	Daniel Hoan	44,423	7.86%	
Democratic	William Sanderson	41,961	7.43%	
Democratic	LaVern Dilweg	21,609	3.83%	
Socialist	Edwin W. Knappe	2,002	0.35%	
Total votes		'564,859'	'100.0%'	
General Election, November 7, 1950
Republican	Alexander Wiley (incumbent)	595,283	53.34%	
Democratic	Thomas E. Fairchild	515,539	46.19%	
Socialist	Edwin W. Knappe	3,972	0.36%	
Independent	Perry J. Stearns	644	0.06%	
Socialist Workers	James E. Boulton	332	0.03%	
Socialist Labor	Artemio Cozzini	307	0.03%	
Total votes		'1,116,077'	'100.0%'	
Republican hold				

United States Senate Election in Wisconsin, 1952
Party	Candidate	Votes	%	±%
Primary Election, September 9, 1952
Republican	Joseph McCarthy (incumbent)	515,481	54.21%	
Republican	Leonard Schmitt	213,701	22.47%	
Democratic	Thomas E. Fairchild	97,321	10.34%	
Democratic	Henry S. Reuss	94,379	9.92%	
Republican	Andrew G. Jacobson	11,639	7.43%	
Republican	Perry J. Stearns	10,353	3.83%	
Republican	Edmund Kerwer	4,078	0.35%	
Republican	Edward J. Finan	4,021	0.35%	
Total votes		'950,973'	'100.0%'	
General Election, November 4, 1952
Republican	Joseph McCarthy (incumbent)	870,444	54.23%	+0.89%
Democratic	Thomas E. Fairchild	731,402	45.57%	−0.63%
Independent	Alfred L. Easterday	1,879	0.12%	
Socialist Workers	James E. Boulton	1,442	0.09%	+0.06%
Total votes		'1,605,167'	'100.0%'	+43.82%
Republican hold				

=== Wisconsin Supreme Court (1956, 1966) ===
1956 Wisconsin Supreme Court election
Party	Candidate	Votes	%	±%
Primary Election, March 6, 1956
Independent	Thomas E. Fairchild	250,442	71.77%	
Independent	William H. Dieterich	68,288	19.57%	
Independent	Clair L. Finch	30,244	8.67%	
Total votes		'348,974'	'100.0%'	
General Election, April 3, 1956
Independent	Thomas E. Fairchild	574,429	77.59%	
Independent	William H. Dieterich	165,953	22.41%	
Total votes		'740,382'	'100.0%'	

1966 Wisconsin Supreme Court election
Party	Candidate	Votes	%	±%
General Election, April 5, 1966
Independent	Thomas E. Fairchild (incumbent)	564,132	100.0%	
Total votes		'564,132'	'100.0%'	

Legal offices
Preceded by Grover L. Broadfoot	Attorney General of Wisconsin; 1948–1951	Succeeded by Vernon W. Thomson
Preceded by Charles H. Cashin	United States Attorney for the Western District of Wisconsin; 1951–1952	Succeeded by Frank Nikolay
Preceded by Edward T. Fairchild	Justice of the Wisconsin Supreme Court; 1957–1966	Succeeded by Leo B. Hanley
Preceded by F. Ryan Duffy	Judge of the United States Court of Appeals for the Seventh Circuit; 1966–1981	Succeeded by John Louis Coffey
Preceded by Luther Merritt Swygert	Chief Judge of the United States Court of Appeals for the Seventh Circuit; 1975–1981	Succeeded by Walter J. Cummings Jr.
Party political offices
Preceded by Elizabeth Hawkes	Democratic nominee for Attorney General of Wisconsin; 1948	Succeeded by Henry S. Reuss
Preceded by Howard J. McMurray	Democratic nominee for U.S. Senator from Wisconsin (Class 3); 1950	Succeeded by Henry Maier
Preceded by Howard J. McMurray	Democratic nominee for U.S. Senator from Wisconsin (Class 1); 1952	Succeeded by William Proxmire
