= James Ward Rector =

American judge

- portrait photograph, circa 1949

Justice of the Wisconsin Supreme Court
- In office April 1946 – December 31, 1947
- Preceded by: Joseph Martin
- Succeeded by: Henry P. Hughes

Personal details
- Born: June 24, 1903 Glenwood, Missouri
- Died: August 6, 1979 (aged 76)
- Spouse: Virginia Rector
- Children: 4
- Education: University of Wisconsin–Madison; University of Wisconsin Law School

James Ward Rector (June 24, 1903 – August 6, 1979) was an American jurist from Wisconsin who served as a justice on the Wisconsin Supreme Court.

== Early life, education, career ==
Rector was in Glenwood, Missouri. He graduated high school at the age of sixteen. He attended the University of Missouri, but left the school amid the recession of 1920–1921 in order to work in the logging industry to earn money to pay for his further education.

At the encouragement of family friend Glenn Frank, the president of the University of Wisconsin, Rector enrolled at the University of Wisconsin (in Madison, Wisconsin) in 1925. He lived at the Frank family residence and tutored Frank's son while attending the university. In 1930, he graduated from the University of Wisconsin Law School, and practicing for a law firm in Madison.

Rector worked for several governors of Wisconsin. He was executive secretary to Albert G. Schmedeman, special counsel to Julius P. Heil. He also served as Wisconsin's deputy attorney general during Heil's governorship, during which time he won fourteen cases he argued before Wisconsin Supreme Court.

== Wisconsin Supreme Court ==
In April 1946, Rector was appointed to the Wisconsin Supreme Court (filling the seat left vacant by the death on the bench of Joseph Maritn). He sought to retain his seat, was defeated by Henry P. Hughes in the 1947 election.

Rector ran again for state supreme court in 1949, but again lost.

== Subsequent career ==
After his re-election loss, Rector was offered a post as a Nuremberg war crimes trials judge, but declined the offer. Rector did not view such work as contributing to advancing the cause of law. Rector returned to the practice of law after losing re-election.

In 1948, Rector was appointed deputy council of the Wisconsin Public Service Commission, resigning the following year in order to become vice president of the First Wisconsin Trust Company of Milwaukee. He held this role until retiring in 1968.

== Personal life and death ==
Rector and his wife, Virginia, had four children: James Jr., Schuyler, Nancy, and Kathleen. Their son, James Jr., served as the commissioner of the Wisconsin Supreme Court.

Rector died at the age of 77 on August 6, 1979.
