= 1909 Wisconsin Supreme Court election =

- April 6, 1909
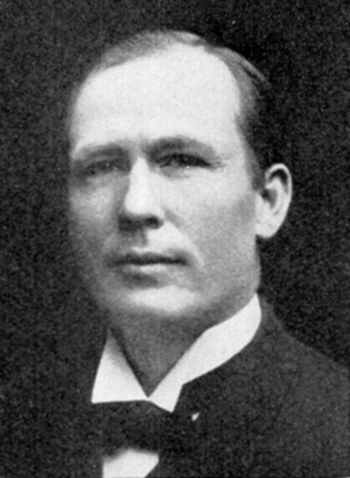
Candidate	John Barnes
Popular vote	155,662
Percentage	99.74%
Justice before election
John Barnes
Elected Justice
John Barnes

The 1909 Wisconsin Supreme Court election was held on Tuesday, April 6, 1909, to elect a justice to the Wisconsin Supreme Court. Incumbent justice John Barnes was re-elected, unopposed.

== Results ==
1909 Wisconsin Supreme Court election
Party	Candidate	Votes	%	±%
General election (April 6, 1909)
Nonpartisan	John Barnes	155,662	99.74	
	Scattering	412	0.26	
Total votes		156074	100	
