= Glenwood, Missouri =

- Village
- Location of Glenwood, Missouri
- Coordinates: 40°31′27″N 92°34′36″W
- Country: United States
- State: Missouri
- County: Schuyler

Area
  - Total: 0.74 sq mi (1.92 km^{2})
  - Land: 0.74 sq mi (1.91 km^{2})
  - Water: 0.0039 sq mi (0.01 km^{2})
- Elevation: 945 ft (288 m)

Population (2020)
  - Total: 181
  - Density: 245.3/sq mi (94.73/km^{2})
- Time zone: UTC-6 (Central (CST))
  - Summer (DST): UTC-5 (CDT)
- ZIP code: 63541
- Area code: 660
- FIPS code: 29-27514
- GNIS feature ID: 2398980

Glenwood is a village in Schuyler County, Missouri, United States. As of the 2020 census, its population was 181. It is part of the Kirksville Micropolitan Statistical Area.

== History ==
The town of Glenwood was laid out by Alexander and Stiles Forsha in November 1868 with the plat consisting of a town square and forty-four other blocks. The first home had been built in the town the previous month by John B. Glaze. By 1869, a schoolhouse had been constructed as well as a two-story block of brick buildings with room for four businesses. Being at the crossing point of two railroads, the St. Louis, Kansas City & Nebraska Railroad and the Keokuk & Western railway, Glenwood saw rapid early growth. By 1873, the town included a large woolen factory, a flour mill, foundry, machine shop, wagon factory and a multitude of other businesses. The Glenwood Citerion newspaper began publication in 1870 and Logan's Bank, the town's first, was established in 1875.
On July 26, 2011, the United States Postal Service announced plans to permanently close the Glenwood post office as part of a nationwide restructuring plan.

== Notable person ==
- James Ward Rector, (1903 - 1979), Wisconsin Supreme Court jurist; born in Glenwood.

== Geography ==
According to the United States Census Bureau, the village has a total area of 0.74 square miles (1.92 km^{2}), all land.

== Demographics ==
Historical population
Census	Pop.	Note	%±
1880	523		—
1890	451		−13.8%
1900	434		−3.8%
1910	375		−13.6%
1920	290		−22.7%
1930	333		14.8%
1940	315		−5.4%
1950	258		−18.1%
1960	242		−6.2%
1970	184		−24.0%
1980	218		18.5%
1990	195		−10.6%
2000	203		4.1%
2010	196		−3.4%
2020	181		−7.7%
U.S. Decennial Census

=== 2010 census ===
As of the census of 2010, there were 196 people, 89 households, and 52 families residing in the village. The population density was 264.9 inhabitants per square mile (102.3/km^{2}). There were 98 housing units at an average density of 132.4 per square mile (51.1/km^{2}). The racial makeup of the village was 99.5% White and 0.5% from two or more races. Hispanic or Latino of any race were 1.5% of the population.

There were 89 households, of which 27.0% had children under the age of 18 living with them, 47.2% were married couples living together, 6.7% had a female householder with no husband present, 4.5% had a male householder with no wife present, and 41.6% were non-families. 36.0% of all households were made up of individuals, and 23.6% had someone living alone who was 65 years of age or older. The average household size was 2.20 and the average family size was 2.88.

The median age in the village was 47.7 years. 21.4% of residents were under the age of 18; 6.6% were between the ages of 18 and 24; 16.9% were from 25 to 44; 34.6% were from 45 to 64; and 20.4% were 65 years of age or older. The gender makeup of the village was 48.0% male and 52.0% female.

=== 2000 census ===
As of the census of 2000, there were 203 people, 74 households, and 56 families residing in the village. The population density was 275.8 inhabitants per square mile (106.5/km^{2}). There were 93 housing units at an average density of 126.4 per square mile (48.8/km^{2}). The racial makeup of the village was 99.51% White and 0.49% Native American.

There were 74 households, out of which 41.9% had children under the age of 18 living with them, 70.3% were married couples living together, 4.1% had a female householder with no husband present, and 23.0% were non-families. 23.0% of all households were made up of individuals, and 16.2% had someone living alone who was 65 years of age or older. The average household size was 2.74 and the average family size was 3.25.

In the village, the population was spread out, with 32.5% under the age of 18, 5.9% from 18 to 24, 27.6% from 25 to 44, 21.2% from 45 to 64, and 12.8% who were 65 years of age or older. The median age was 36 years. For every 100 females, there were 88.0 males. For every 100 females age 18 and over, there were 93.0 males.

The median income for a household in the village was $32,500, and the median income for a family was $34,250. Males had a median income of $29,063 versus $25,313 for females. The per capita income for the village was $15,356. About 11.8% of families and 11.9% of the population were below the poverty line, including 18.6% of those under the age of eighteen and 5.4% of those 65 or over.

== Education ==
It is in the Schuyler County R-I School District.
