= 1947 Wisconsin Supreme Court election =

- April 1, 1947

Candidate	Henry P. Hughes	James Ward Rector
Popular vote	381,217	245,871
Percentage	51.23%	39.21%
Justice before election
James Ward Rector
Elected Justice
Henry P. Hughes

The 1947 Wisconsin Supreme Court election was held on Tuesday, April 1, 1947, to elect a justice to the Wisconsin Supreme Court for a ten-year term. Henry P. Hughes defeated incumbent justice James Ward Rector (who had been appointed after the death on the bench of Joseph Martin). This was the first instance in nearly three decades in which an incumbent justice of the Wisconsin Supreme Court lost an election for their seat on the court.

== Background ==
After the death of Joseph Martin, James Ward Rector was appointed justice in 1946. Prior to this appointment, Rector who had been working in an administrative role in the state government as deputy state attorney general

== Campaign ==
Rector was challenged by Henry P. Hughes, a circuit court judge who had unsuccessfully run the previous year for a different seat on the state's supreme court (having launched a strong challenge to Edward T. Fairchild). Hughes was a well-known trial judge. He was regarded to have been the better campaigner of the two candidates. A Green Bay Press-Gazette writer would recount eleven years later, "[Hughes] had a good campaign organization. He stumped actively and effectively." Hughes and his allies argued that Rector had had insufficient trial court experience to warrant holding a seat on the state's high court.

Hughes and Rector both received endorsements from prominent state Republicans: Rector was endorsed by Governor Walter Samuel Goodland (who died a month before the election), and Hughes was endorsed by recently elected U.S. senator Joseph McCarthy.

== Result ==
Hughes won 61% of the vote. Historically, Wisconsin voters had voted to return incumbent supreme court justices who lacked any controversial record. Rector's defeat (as well as the defeat of Emmert L. Wingert eleven years later in 1958) were seen as eroding this "tradition". Since then, three further Wisconsin Supreme Court elections have resulted in the unseating of incumbent justices: 1967, 2008, and 2020.

Hughes defeated Rector in all but four of the state's counties. Rector only carried Columbia, Sauk, and his home county of Dane (winning Columbia and Sauk only by slim margins). Hughes carried his home county of Winnebago by a five-to-one margin. Hughes also received substantial leads in nearby Manitowoc, Milwaukee, Outagamie, and Sheboygan counties. Hughes also received strong results in Kenosha, Marathon, Racine –performing particularly strong in the rural areas of those counties.

Hughes' win was seen as so impressive, that there was near-immediate speculation that he might be a strong candidate to challenge incumbent U.S. senator Alexander Wiley when he would be up for re-election in 1950.

1947 Wisconsin Supreme Court election
Party	Candidate	Votes	%
General Election, April 1, 1947
Nonpartisan	Henry P. Hughes	381,217	51.23
Nonpartisan	James Ward Rector (incumbent)	245,871	39.21
Plurality		135,346	21.58
Total votes		627,088	100
