= 1936 Wisconsin lieutenant gubernatorial election =

- November 3, 1936
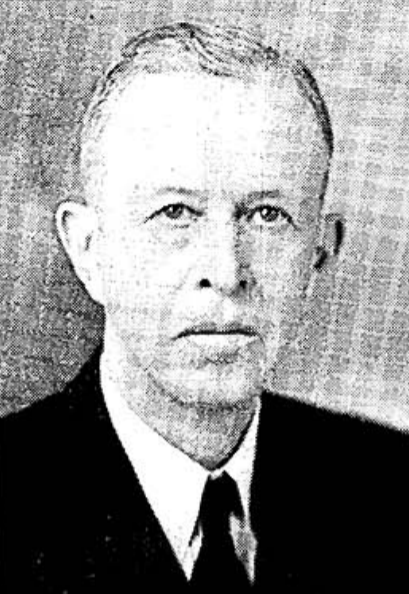

| Nominee | Henry Gunderson | Roland J. Steinle | Edward H. Gervais |
| Party | Progressive | Republican | Democratic |
| Popular vote | 465,918 | 355,340 | 289,964 |
| Percentage | 41.68% | 31.79% | 25.94% |
Lieutenant Governor before election
Vacant
Elected Lieutenant Governor
Henry Gunderson
Progressive

The 1936 Wisconsin lieutenant gubernatorial election was held on November 3, 1936, in order to elect the lieutenant governor of Wisconsin. Progressive nominee Henry Gunderson defeated Republican nominee Roland J. Steinle, Democratic nominee Edward H. Gervais and Socialist Labor nominee Alfred Potter. This election marked the first time and only in the state's history a lieutenant governor was elected who wasn't either a member of the Republican or Democratic Party.

== General election ==
On election day, November 3, 1936, Progressive nominee Henry Gunderson won the election by a margin of 110,578 votes against his foremost opponent Republican nominee Roland J. Steinle, thereby gaining Progressive control over the office of lieutenant governor. Gunderson was sworn in as the 27th lieutenant governor of Wisconsin on January 4, 1937.

=== Results ===
Wisconsin lieutenant gubernatorial election, 1936
| Party | Candidate | Votes | % |
|---|---|---|---|
| Progressive | Henry Gunderson | 465,918 | 41.68 |
| Republican | Roland J. Steinle | 355,340 | 31.79 |
| Democratic | Edward H. Gervais | 289,964 | 25.94 |
| Socialist Labor | Alfred Potter | 3,882 | 0.35 |
| | Scattering | 2,694 | 0.24 |
| Total votes | | 1,117,798 | 100.00 |
| Progressive gain from Democratic | | | |
