= 1958 United States Senate election in Wisconsin =

- November 4, 1958
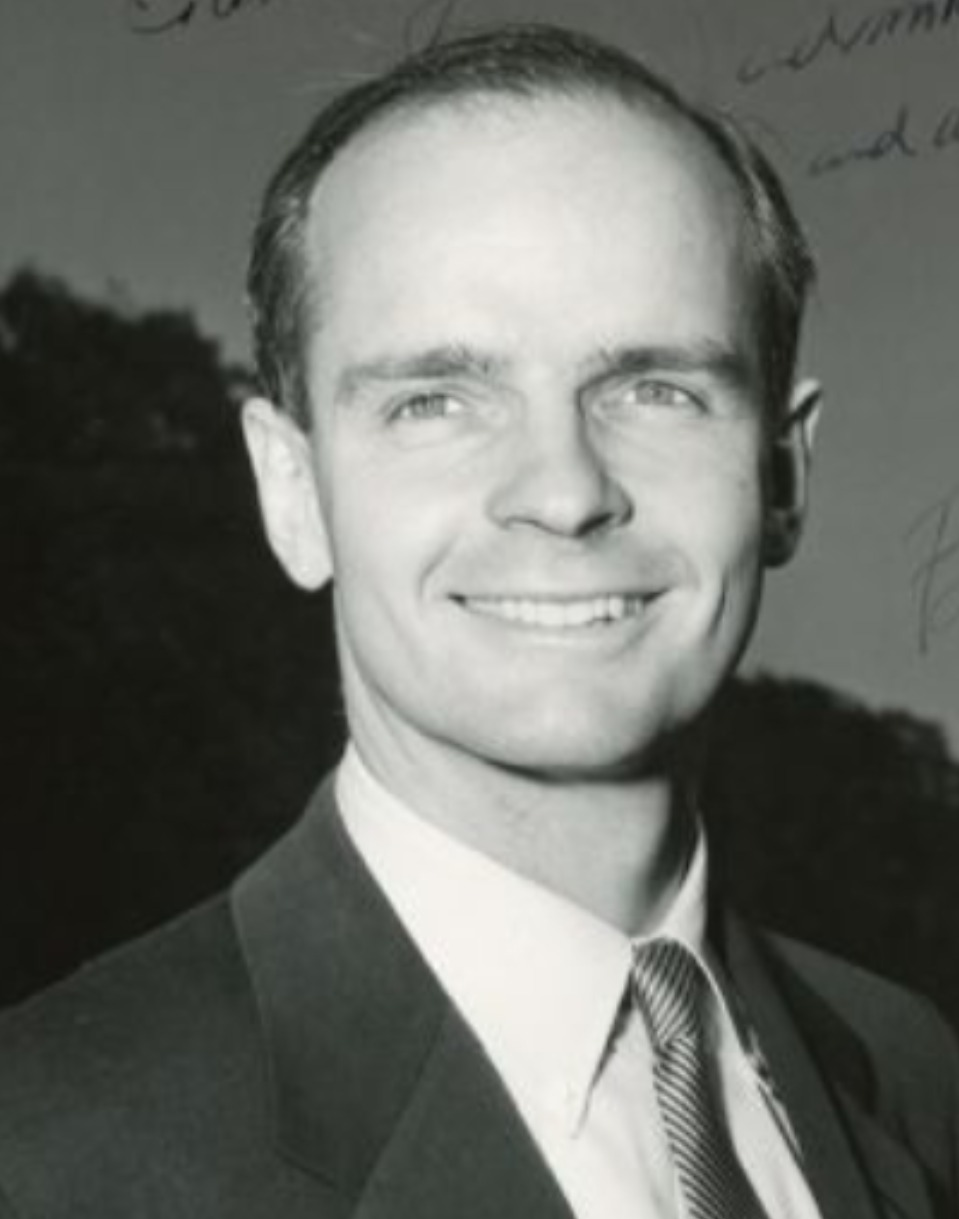

Nominee	William Proxmire	Roland J. Steinle
Party	Democratic	Republican
Popular vote	682,440	510,398
Percentage	57.13%	42.73%
- County results Proxmire: 50–60% 60–70% 70–80% Kohler: 50–60% 60–70%
U.S. senator before election
William Proxmire
Democratic
Elected U.S. Senator
William Proxmire
Democratic

The 1958 United States Senate election in Wisconsin was held on November 4, 1958. Incumbent Democrat William Proxmire, who had won a special election to finish the term of the late Senator Joe McCarthy, was re-elected to a full term in office over Wisconsin Supreme Court Justice Roland J. Steinle, a Republican.

== General election ==
=== Candidates ===
- James E. Boulton (Socialist Workers)
- Georgia Cozzini, perennial candidate (Socialist Labor)
- William Proxmire, incumbent Senator (Democratic)
- Roland J. Steinle, Justice of the Wisconsin Supreme Court (Republican)

=== Results ===
1958 United States Senate election in Wisconsin
Party	Candidate	Votes	%	±%
Democratic	William Proxmire (incumbent)	682,440	57.13%	▲0.69
Republican	Roland J. Steinle	510,398	42.73%	▲2.22
Socialist Workers	James E. Boulton	1,226	0.10%	N/A
Socialist Labor	Georgia Cozzini	537	0.05%	▼0.04
Total votes		1,194,601	100.00%	
Democratic hold		Swing		

== See also ==
- 1958 United States Senate elections
