= Robert M. Bashford House =

Historic house in Wisconsin, United States

- U.S. National Register of Historic Places
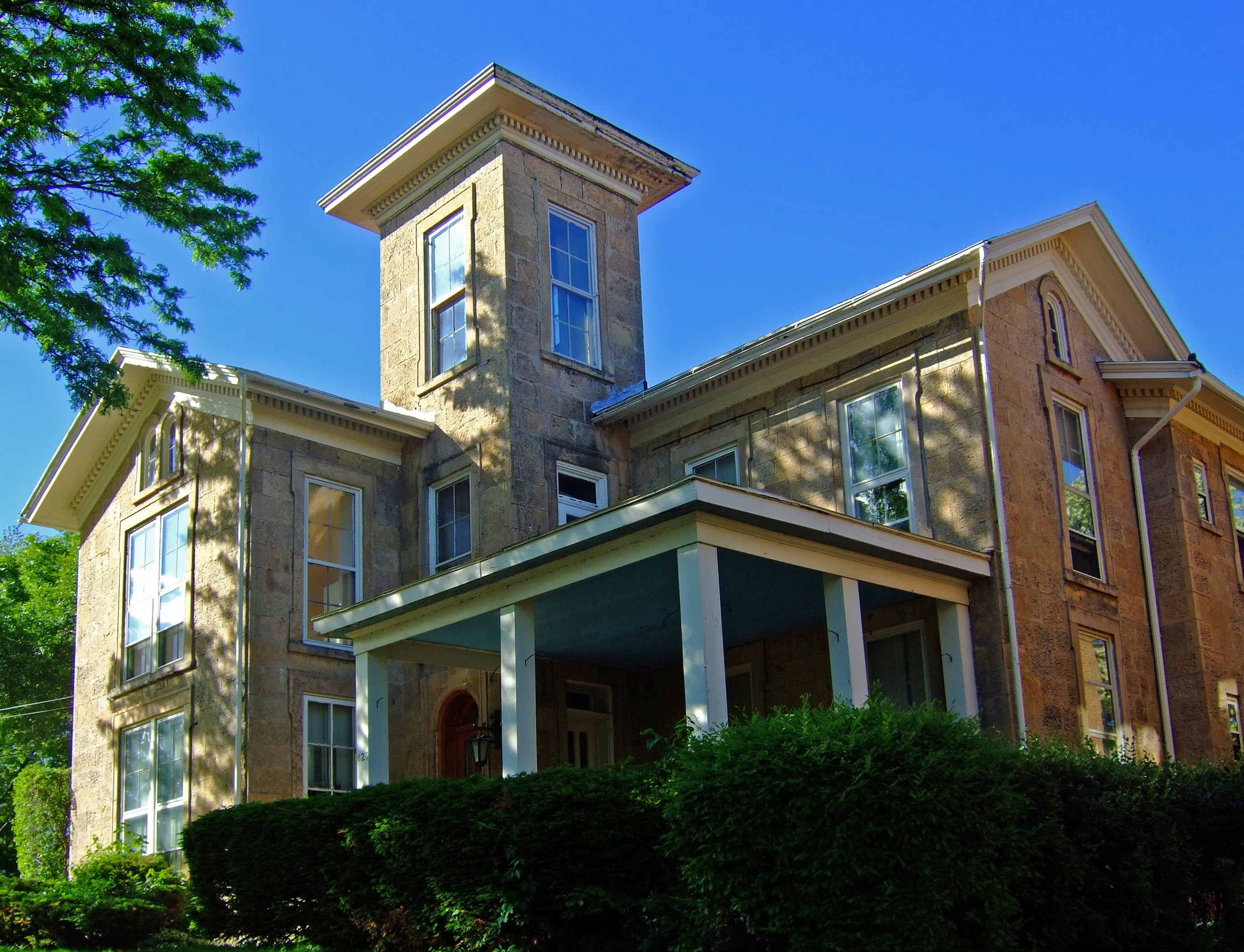

- Location within Wisconsin Location within the United States
- Location: 423 N. Pinckney St. Madison, Wisconsin
- Coordinates: 43°4′44″N 89°23′13″W
- Built: 1858
- Architect: Napoleon Bonaparte Van Slyke
- Architectural style: Italian Villa
- NRHP reference No.: 73000075
- Added to NRHP: March 14, 1973

The Robert M. Bashford House is an Italian Villa style house built around 1858 in Madison, Wisconsin, United States in which the governor of Wisconsin and the mayor of Madison lived. It was added to the National Register of Historic Places in 1973.

== History ==
The Bashford house was built around 1858, probably by local entrepreneur Napoleon Bonaparte Van Slyke, and possibly designed by August Kutzbock. The 3-story tower, the low-pitched roof, the frieze boards, and the round-arched windows in the gable end are typical of Italian Villa style. The style would typically include brackets under the eaves, but this design omits that element. The walls are clad in local sandstone.

Banker H.K. Lawrence was first to live in the house. He was followed by Governor Edward Salomon in the 1860s. Morris E. and Anna Fuller lived in the house from 1865 to 1889. Morris ran an agricultural implement dealership and bought supplies for Camp Randall during the Civil War. Robert McKee Bashford married the Fullers' daughter Sarah in 1889 and lived in the house until 1911. Bashford published the Madison Democrat newspaper, served as city attorney, mayor of Madison, state senator, and state supreme court justice. Dr. Corydon and Bessie Dwight owned the house from 1916 to 1928. Dwight was involved in the development of Vilas Park Zoo. In the 1930s the inside of the house was divided into boarding house rooms.

In 1972, the house was designated a landmark by the Madison Landmarks Commission. The building now serves as an apartment.
