= Emmert L. Wingert =

American lawyer and judge. Justice of the Wisconsin Supreme Court

The Honorable Emmert L. Wingert
- Portrait of Wingert as justice

Justice of the Wisconsin Supreme Court
- In office September 5, 1956 – January 1, 1959
- Appointed by: Walter J. Kohler, Jr.
- Preceded by: Edward J. Gehl
- Succeeded by: William H. Dieterich

Personal details
- Born: Emmert Laurson Wingert; April 2, 1899 Mount Carroll, Illinois
- Died: February 1, 1971 (aged 71) Wisconsin
- Resting place: Forest Hill Cemetery; Madison, Wisconsin
- Party: Republican
- Education: Beloit College; Harvard Law School
- Profession: lawyer, judge

Emmert Laurson Wingert (April 2, 1899 – February 1, 1971) was an American lawyer and judge from Wisconsin. He was a justice of the Wisconsin Supreme Court and executive counsel to Governor Walter J. Kohler, Sr.

== Biography ==
Wingert, circa 1958

Born in Mount Carroll, Illinois, Wingert graduated from Harvard Law School. He practiced law in Madison, Wisconsin, worked in office of the Wisconsin Attorney General, and was executive counsel to Walter J. Kohler, Sr., when he was Governor of Wisconsin. During Kohler's term, Wingert represented Wisconsin at the National Conference on Uniform State Laws. Years later, under Kohler's son, Governor Walter J. Kohler, Jr., Wingert was Vice Chairman of the Governor's Commission on the Study of Retirement Systems, and, after the death of Justice Edward J. Gehl, in 1956, Governor Kohler appointed Wingert to the Wisconsin Supreme Court. Wingert was defeated in his first Supreme Court election, in April 1958, and left office at the end of his term, on January 1, 1959.

== Electoral history ==
1958 Wisconsin Supreme Court election
Party	Candidate	Votes	%	±%
General Election, April 1, 1958
Nonpartisan	William H. Dieterich	232,955	52.43%	+30.02%
Nonpartisan	Emmert L. Wingert (incumbent)	211,319	47.57%	
Total votes		444,274	100.0%	-41.32%
