= Robert McKee Bashford =

American politician and judge (1845–1911)

The Honorable Robert M. Bashford
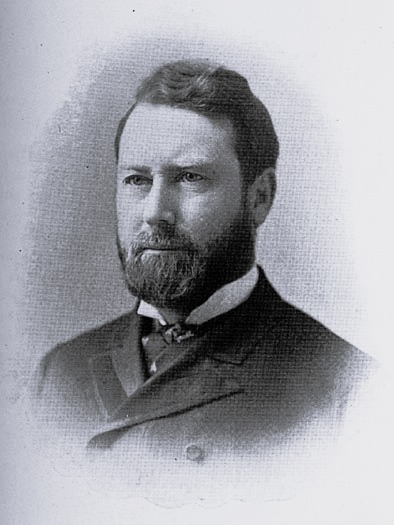
- Bashford c. 1880's

Justice of the Wisconsin Supreme Court
- In office January 8, 1908 – July 1, 1908
- Appointed by: James O. Davidson
- Preceded by: John B. Cassoday
- Succeeded by: John Barnes

Member of the Wisconsin Senate from the 26th district
- In office January 11, 1893 – January 13, 1897
- Preceded by: Willett Main
- Succeeded by: Chauncey B. Welton

25th Mayor of Madison, Wisconsin
- In office April 1890 – April 1891
- Preceded by: Moses Ransom Doyon
- Succeeded by: William H. Rogers

Personal details
- Born: Robert McKee Bashford; December 31, 1845 Fayette, Wisconsin
- Died: January 29, 1911 (aged 65) Madison, Wisconsin, U.S.
- Cause of death: Cardiovascular disease
- Resting place: Forest Hill Cemetery; Madison, Wisconsin
- Party: Democratic
- Spouses: Florence E. Taylor; (died 1886); Sarah Amelia Fuller; (died 1915)
- Children: Florence (Spensley)^{(b. 1875; died 1942)}
- Parents: Samuel Morris Bashford (father); Mary Ann (McKee) (Trousdale) (mother)
- Profession: Lawyer

Robert McKee Bashford (December 31, 1845 – January 29, 1911) was an American lawyer and politician who served as the 25th mayor of Madison, Wisconsin, and represented Dane County in the Wisconsin State Senate from 1893 to 1897. He also served briefly as a justice of the Wisconsin Supreme Court in 1908, after the death of Chief Justice John B. Cassoday.

== Biography ==
Born in Fayette, Wisconsin, Bashford graduated from the University of Wisconsin in 1870 and from the University of Wisconsin Law School in 1871. He later received his master's degree from the university in 1874. In 1871, Bashford along with two others purchased the Madison Democrat newspaper, where Bashford was editor until 1876. He then practiced law in Madison, Wisconsin, and served as city attorney from 1881 to 1886. In 1886, he moved to Chicago, Illinois, where he continued to practice law. While his firm was successful, he did not care for the work and moved back to Madison.

In 1890, Bashford became mayor of Madison, defeating Arthur Loomis Sanborn in the April election. During his tenure he assisted the state attorney general to prosecute former state treasurers of Wisconsin to get money they had collected from interest on the deposit of public funds. The state recovered nearly half a million dollars. From 1891 to 1895, he served in the Wisconsin State Senate. He resumed his law practice, including arguing before the United States Supreme Court in the 1905 case of United States v. Stinson, in which he successfully defended a land purchaser from the federal government's attempt to reclaim the land based on accusations of fraud. In 1908, Bashford was appointed to the Wisconsin Supreme Court, but lost a special election for the position four months later. He resumed his law practice and was on the faculty of the University of Wisconsin Law School.

== Personal life and family ==
Bashford was the son of Reverend Samuel Morris Bashford and his wife, Mary Ann (McKee) Parkinson Bashford. Bashford's father died when he was only five years old. His mother remarried to William Pearce Trousdale, who became Bashford's stepfather.

Bashford's first wife was Florence E. Taylor, the second daughter of Wisconsin Governor William Robert Taylor. They had one daughter together before her death in 1886. Bashford remarried with Sarah Amelia Fuller, who survived him.

== Bashford House ==
His former home, now known as the Robert M. Bashford House, is listed on the National Register of Historic Places.

== Electoral history ==
=== Madison mayor (1890) ===
Madison, Wisconsin, Mayoral Election, 1890
Party	Candidate	Votes	%	±%
General Election, April 1, 1890
Democratic	Robert M. Bashford	1,454	56.71%	
Republican	Arthur L. Sanborn	1,110	43.29%	
Plurality		344	13.42%	
Total votes		2,564	100.0%	
Democratic hold				

=== Wisconsin Supreme Court (1908) ===
1908 Wisconsin Supreme Court special election
Party	Candidate	Votes	%	±%
General Election, April 7, 1908
Nonpartisan	John Barnes	134,642	57.42%	
Nonpartisan	Robert M. Bashford (incumbent)	84,656	36.10%	
Nonpartisan	William Ruger	15,168	6.47%	
	Scattering	30	0.01%	
Plurality		49,986	21.32%	
Total votes		234,496	100.0%	

Wisconsin Senate
Preceded by Willett Main	Member of the Wisconsin Senate from the 26th district January 11, 1893 – January 13, 1897	Succeeded by Chauncey B. Welton
Political offices
Preceded by Moses Ransom Doyon	Mayor of Madison, Wisconsin; April 1890 – April 1891	Succeeded by William H. Rogers
Legal offices
Preceded by John B. Cassoday	Justice of the Wisconsin Supreme Court; January 8, 1908 – July 1, 1908	Succeeded by John Barnes
