= 1950 United States Senate election in Wisconsin =

- November 7, 1950
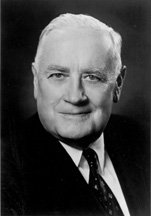

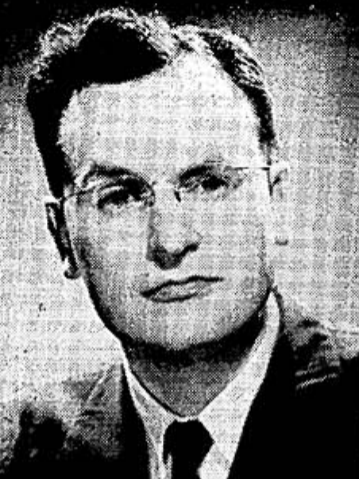
| Nominee | Alexander Wiley | Thomas E. Fairchild |
| Party | Republican | Democratic |
| Popular vote | 595,283 | 515,539 |
| Percentage | 53.34% | 46.19% |
- County results Wiley: 50–60% 60–70% 70–80% Fairchild: 50–60% 60–70%
U.S. senator before election
Alexander Wiley
Republican
Elected U.S. Senator
Alexander Wiley
Republican

The 1950 United States Senate election in Wisconsin was held on November 7, 1950. Incumbent Republican U.S. Senator Alexander Wiley was re-elected to a third term in office over Thomas E. Fairchild.

== Republican primary ==
=== Candidates ===
- Edward J. Finan
- Alexander Wiley, incumbent U.S. Senator since 1939

=== Results ===
1950 U.S. Senate Republican primary
| Party | Candidate | Votes | % |
|---|---|---|---|
| Republican | Alexander Wiley (incumbent) | 308,536 | 77.82% |
| Republican | Edward J. Finan | 87,929 | 22.18% |
| Total votes | | 396,465 | 100.00% |

== Democratic primary ==
=== Candidates ===
- LaVern Dilweg, former U.S. Representative from Green Bay
- Thomas E. Fairchild, Attorney General of Wisconsin
- Daniel Hoan, former Social-Democratic mayor of Milwaukee and nominee for Governor in 1944 and 1946
- William E. Sanderson

=== Results ===
1950 U.S. Senate Democratic primary
| Party | Candidate | Votes | % |
|---|---|---|---|
| Democratic | Thomas E. Fairchild | 58,399 | 35.10% |
| Democratic | Daniel Hoan | 44,423 | 26.70% |
| Democratic | William E. Sanderson | 41,961 | 25.22% |
| Democratic | LaVern Dilweg | 21,609 | 12.99% |
| Total votes | | 166,392 | 100.00% |

== General election ==
=== Candidates ===
- James E. Boulton (Socialist Workers)
- Artemio Cozzini (Socialist Labor)
- Thomas E. Fairchild, Attorney General of Wisconsin (Democratic)
- Edwin W. Knappe (Social-Democratic)
- Perry J. Stearns, perennial candidate (Constitutional Freedom)
- Alexander Wiley, incumbent U.S. Senator since 1939 (Republican)

=== Results ===
1950 U.S. Senate election in Wisconsin
| Party | Candidate | Votes | % | ±% |
|---|---|---|---|---|
| Republican | Alexander Wiley (incumbent) | 595,283 | 53.34% | |
| Democratic | Thomas E. Fairchild | 515,539 | 46.19% | |
| Social-Democratic | Edwin W. Knappe | 3,972 | 0.36% | |
| Independent | Perry J. Stearns | 644 | 0.06% | |
| Socialist Workers | James E. Boulton | 332 | 0.03% | |
| Socialist Labor | Artemio Cozzini | 307 | 0.03% | |
| Republican hold | | Swing | | |

== See also ==
- 1950 United States Senate elections
