= 1946 Wisconsin Supreme Court election =

- April 2, 1946

Candidate	Edward T. Fairchild	Henry P. Hughes
Popular vote	156,880	149,331
Percentage	51.23%	48.77%
Justice before election
Edward T. Fairchild
Elected Justice
Edward T. Fairchild

Newspaper advertisements

Fairchild advertisement

Hughes advertisement

The 1946 Wisconsin Supreme Court election was held on Tuesday, April 2, 1946, to elect a justice to the Wisconsin Supreme Court for a ten-year term. Incumbent justice Edward T. Fairchild narrowly defeated challenger Henry P. Hughes.

== Result ==
1946 Wisconsin Supreme Court election
Party	Candidate	Votes	%
General election (April 2, 1946)
Nonpartisan	Edward T. Fairchild (incumbent)	156,880	51.23
Nonpartisan	Henry P. Hughes	149,331	48.77
Majority		7,549	2.47
Total votes		306,211	100
