= 1954 Wisconsin Supreme Court election =

- April 6, 1954

Candidate	Roland J. Steinle	William H. Dieterich
Popular vote	297,369	200,224
Percentage	59.76%	40.24%
Justice before election
Roland J. Steinle
Elected Justice
Roland J. Steinle

The 1954 Wisconsin Supreme Court election was held on Tuesday, April 6, 1954 to elect a justice to a full ten-year seat the Wisconsin Supreme Court. Incumbent justice Roland J. Steinle (who had been appointed the previous year to fill a vacancy) won the election, defeating William H. Dieterich (a perennial candidate for state office) in the general election by a sizable margin. Prior to the general election, a nonpartisan primary was held in which both Steinle and Dieterich advanced over Perry J. Stearns.

== Background ==
In 1953, incumbent justice Oscar Fritz announced that he would not seek re-election in 1954. In December 1953, he retired early from his seat. Governor Walter J. Kohler Jr. appointed Roland J. Steinle (a 13-year incumbent of a Circuit Court judgeship in Milwaukee) to fill the Supreme Court vacancy.

Due to the timing of Fritz's retirement (coming shortly before the already-scheduled spring 1954 date for the next election to the seat) the next election did not need to be shifted. This was the first election to be held after an April 1953 referendum in which Wisconsin voters had ratified a amendment that made all elections to the supreme court for full ten-year terms (whether regularly scheduled or to fill a vacancy occurring before the expiration of a preceding term) though this change did not impact the 1954 election since a regularly scheduled ten-year election to this seat had already been scheduled in 1954 even before the vacancy arose.

The primary was the only statewide vote on the spring primary ballot. Stearns' late entrance into the race (filing his candidacy an hour before the deadline) necessitated that a primary be held to narrow the field to two candidates.

== Candidates ==
- Roland J. Steinle: incumbent justice (appointed in 1953), former circuit court judge
- William H. Dieterich: Hartford-based attorney; perennial candidate (Note: unsuccessful candidate for Wisconsin attorney general (1942, 1944, 1946 and 1948)) for state office; former special assistant attorney general (1937–1938); former Wisconsin commander of the Disabled American Veterans
- Perry J. Stearns, Milwaukee-based attorney and perennial candidate for state office (Note: unsuccessful candidate in the 1944 and 1946 Republican primaries for U.S. Senate; unsuccessful candidate for Supreme Court in 1953)

== Campaign ==
After the primary, the Associated Press reported, "there was little active campaigning in the Supreme Court race and a light [voter turnout] was recorded in most areas." Ahead of the general election, the same agency expected a low turnout for the general election, observing, "there has been very little activity by either candidate and there are few local issues that have caused interest."

Steinle was endorsed by the American Federation of Labor-affiliated North Central Labor Council.

== Results ==
1954 Wisconsin Supreme Court election
Party	Candidate	Votes	%
Nonpartisan primary (March 9, 1954)
Nonpartisan	Roland J. Steinle (incumbent)	125,530	61.74
Nonpartisan	William H. Dieterich	49,669	24.43
Nonpartisan	Perry J. Stearns	28,134	13.84
Total votes		203,333	100
General electiomn (April 6, 1954)
Nonpartisan	Roland J. Steinle (incumbent)	297,369	59.76
Nonpartisan	William H. Dieterich	200,224	40.24
Majority		97,145	19.52
Total votes		497,593	100
