= Henry P. Hughes =

20th century American judge

- Hughes, circa 1946

Justice of the Wisconsin Supreme Court
- In office January 1, 1948 – August 13, 1951
- Preceded by: James Ward Rector
- Succeeded by: George R. Currie

Wisconsin Circuit Judge for the 3rd Circuit
- In office December 3, 1937 – January 1, 1948
- Appointed by: Philip La Follette
- Preceded by: Fred Beglinger
- Succeeded by: Helmuth F. Arps

Personal details
- Born: August 13, 1904 Fountain Prairie, Wisconsin, U.S.
- Died: December 12, 1968 (aged 64) Nekimi, Wisconsin, U.S.
- Cause of death: Traffic collision
- Resting place: Lake View Memorial Park, Oshkosh
- Spouse: Dorothy Margaret Callahan (m. 1930–1968)
- Children: 4
- Education: Oshkosh State Teachers College; Marquette University; Georgetown University Law Center (LL.B.)
- Profession: Lawyer

Henry Patrick Hughes (August 13, 1904 – December 12, 1968) was an American lawyer and jurist from Oshkosh, Wisconsin. He was a justice of the Wisconsin Supreme Court from 1948 until resigning in 1951. He previously served ten years as a Wisconsin circuit court judge in east-central Wisconsin.

== Biography ==
Henry Hughes was born in Fountain Prairie, Wisconsin, in August 1904. He received his early education in Columbia County, Wisconsin, and then attended Oshkosh State Teachers College (now the University of Wisconsin–Oshkosh). He went on to attend Marquette University and Georgetown University Law Center where he earned his LL.B. in 1927.

He practiced law at an Oshkosh law firm from 1928 to 1934 and simultaneously served as city attorney in 1933 and 1934. In 1934, he was elected municipal judge for the city of Oshkosh. He continued in that office until December 1937, when he was appointed a Wisconsin circuit court judge by Governor Philip La Follette. Hughes presided over Wisconsin's 3rd judicial circuit, which then comprised Winnebago and Calumet counties. He was subsequently elected to a full term as judge in 1938, and was re-elected without opposition in 1944.

Hughes first ran for a seat on the Wisconsin Supreme Court in the April 1946 election. He challenged incumbent justice Edward T. Fairchild, who by then had been on the court for 16 years. The election was surprisingly competitive, but Fairchild ultimately prevailed with 51% of the vote.

Undeterred, Hughes ran again in 1947. This time, the incumbent justice, James Ward Rector, had just been appointed to the court and was running in his first election. Hughes alleged that Rector, who had been appointed from an administrative role as deputy state attorney general, did not have sufficient trial experience to warrant a seat on the high court. Hughes and Rector were both endorsed by prominent state Republicans, Rector was endorsed by Governor Walter Samuel Goodland (who died a month before the election), and Hughes was endorsed by recently elected U.S. senator Joseph McCarthy. Hughes won 61% of the vote in the April 1947 election, becoming the first person to defeat an incumbent Wisconsin Supreme Court justice in nearly 40 years.

Despite being elected to a ten-year term, after just two years rumors began to circulate that Hughes was planning to quit the court. Initially it was rumored that he might be planning to challenge senator McCarthy in the 1952 Senate primary, but ultimately, when Hughes announced his resignation in August 1951, he returned to his law practice, stating that he could not support his family on the salary of a Wisconsin Supreme Court justice (then $10,000 per year, or $117,000 adjusted for inflation to 2023).

Hughes remained a prominent attorney in Oshkosh for the rest of his life. He died in a car accident in 1968 when his car struck a stationary school bus on Wisconsin Highway 26 in Nekimi, Wisconsin. Several children were also injured in the accident, but Hughes was the only fatality. Hughes was on his way home from the funeral of chief justice John E. Martin.

== Personal life and family ==
Henry Hughes was the youngest of four children born to William Hughes (1870–1917) and Clara (née Hepp) Hughes (1872–1950). He married Dorothy Callahan in 1930, they had four sons together.

== Electoral history ==
=== Wisconsin Circuit Court (1938) ===
Wisconsin Circuit Courts, 3rd Circuit Election, 1938
Party	Candidate	Votes	%	±%
General Election, April 5, 1938
Nonpartisan	Henry P. Hughes (incumbent)	17,204	69.40%	
Nonpartisan	Lloyd D. Mitchell	7,586	30.60%	
Plurality		9,618	38.80%	
Total votes		24,790	100.0%	

=== Wisconsin Supreme Court (1946, 1947) ===
1946 Wisconsin Supreme Court election
Party	Candidate	Votes	%	±%
General Election, April 2, 1946
Nonpartisan	Edward T. Fairchild (incumbent)	156,880	51.23%	
Nonpartisan	Henry P. Hughes	149,331	48.77%	
Plurality		7,549	2.47%	
Total votes		306,211	100.0%	

1947 Wisconsin Supreme Court election
Party	Candidate	Votes	%	±%
General Election, April 1, 1947
Nonpartisan	Henry P. Hughes	381,217	51.23%	+12.02%
Nonpartisan	James Ward Rector (incumbent)	245,871	39.21%	
Plurality		135,346	21.58%	+19.12%
Total votes		627,088	100.0%	+104.79%

Legal offices
Preceded by Fred Beglinger	Wisconsin Circuit Judge for the 3rd Circuit; December 3, 1937 – January 1, 1948	Succeeded by Helmuth F. Arps
Preceded by James Ward Rector	Justice of the Wisconsin Supreme Court; January 1, 1948 – August 13, 1951	Succeeded by George R. Currie
