= Clair Finch =

American lawyer, member of the Wisconsin Assembly

Clair L. Finch

Member of the Wisconsin State Assembly from the Langlade district
- In office January 1, 1943 – September 13, 1949
- Preceded by: James T. Cavanaugh
- Succeeded by: Walter D. Cavers

Personal details
- Born: Clair L. Finch; July 31, 1911 Palisade, Colorado
- Died: December 1, 1976 (aged 65) Madison, Wisconsin
- Resting place: Antigo Cemetery; Antigo, Wisconsin
- Party: Republican
- Education: University of Wisconsin (B.A.); University of Wisconsin Law School (LL.B.)
- Profession: lawyer, politician

Clair L. Finch (July 31, 1911 – December 1, 1976) was an American lawyer and politician. He was a member of the Wisconsin State Assembly for four terms.

== Biography ==
Born in Palisade, Colorado, Finch graduated from Antigo High School in Antigo, Wisconsin. He received his bachelor's degree from University of Wisconsin and his law degree from University of Wisconsin Law School. Finch practiced law in Antigo, Wisconsin and was a Republican. Finch served in the Wisconsin State Assembly in 1943, 1945, 1947, and 1949. He resigned from the Assembly after the 1949 session. From 1940 to 1974, Finch served on the Wisconsin Board of Tax Appeals and was chairman of the tax appeal board. Finch died in a hospital in Madison, Wisconsin, and was buried in Antigo, Wisconsin.

Finch ran in the 1956 Wisconsin Supreme Court election.
