= List of justices of the Wisconsin Supreme Court =

This is a list of justices who have served or are currently serving on the Wisconsin Supreme Court.

== Territorial judges ==
Judge	Term as justice		Term as chief		Succeeded	Notes
Judge	Start	End	Start	End	Succeeded	Notes
Charles Dunn	1836	1848	1836	1848	New seat	Appointed by Andrew Jackson.
William C. Frazer	1836	1838			New seat	Appointed by Andrew Jackson. Died in office.
David Irvin	1836	1848			New seat	Appointed by Andrew Jackson.
Andrew G. Miller	1838	1848			William C. Frazer	Appointed by Martin Van Buren.

== Circuit justices serving as Supreme Court justices ==
Initially, Wisconsin's Supreme Court was just composed of the five judges of the five state judicial circuits. A sixth circuit was added in 1850.

Judge	Term as justice		Term as chief		Succeeded	Notes
Judge	Start	End	Start	End	Succeeded	Notes
Alexander W. Stow	1848	1851	1848	1851	New seat	Elected in 4th circuit.
Levi Hubbell	1848	1853	1851	1851	New seat	Elected in 2nd circuit.
Edward V. Whiton	1848	1853	1852	1853	New seat	Elected in 1st circuit.
Charles H. Larrabee	1848	1853			New seat	Elected in 3rd circuit.
Mortimer M. Jackson	1848	1853			New seat	Elected in 5th circuit.
Wiram Knowlton	1850	1853			New seat	Elected in 6th circuit.
Timothy O. Howe	1851	1853			Alexander W. Stow	Elected in 4th circuit.

== Justices since 1853 ==
In 1853, a separate Wisconsin Supreme Court was created with all members elected state-wide. Initially the court was three members; it grew to five seats in 1878, and to its current size of seven justices in 1907. Initially, the chief justice and associate justices were separate offices elected by the public, but a constitutional amendment ratified in 1889 converted all members of the court to "justices" and deemed that the "chief justice" would be the justice who had served longest on the court (seniority). 126 years later, another constitutional amendment changed the selection rules for chief justice, abolishing the "seniority" rule, and instead mandating that the justices of the court would elect a chief justice from their members every two years.

Judge	Term as justice		Term as chief		Succeeded	Notes
Judge	Start	End	Start	End	Succeeded	Notes
Edward V. Whiton	1853	1859	1853	1859	New seat	Elected (as chief justice) 1852, 1857. Died in office.
Samuel Crawford	1853	1855			New seat	Elected 1852. Lost re-election in 1855.
Abram D. Smith	1853	1859			New seat	Elected 1852.
Orsamus Cole	1855	1892	1880	1892	Sam. Crawford (as justice); E. G. Ryan (as chief justice)	Elected 1855. Appointed chief justice by William E. Smith. Elected (as chief justice) 1881.
Luther S. Dixon	1859	1874	1859	1874	E. V. Whiton	Appointed chief justice by Alexander Randall. Elected (as chief justice) 1860, 1863, 1868, 1869. Resigned.
Byron Paine	1859	1864			A. D. Smith	Elected 1859. Resigned.
Jason Downer	1864	1867			B. Paine	Appointed by James T. Lewis. Elected 1865. Resigned.
Byron Paine	1867	1871			J. Downer	Appointed by Lucius Fairchild. Elected 1868. Died in office.
William P. Lyon	1871	1894	1892	1894	B. Paine	Appointed by Lucius Fairchild. Elected 1871, 1877, 1883. Chief justice by seniority rule.
Edward George Ryan	1874	1880	1874	1880	L. S. Dixon	Appointed chief justice by William Robert Taylor. Elected (as chief justice) 1875. Died in office.
David Taylor	1878	1891			New seat	Elected 1878, 1885.
Harlow S. Orton	1878	1895	1894	1895	New seat	Elected 1877, 1887. Chief justice by seniority rule. Died in office.
John B. Cassoday	1880	1907	1895	1907	O. Cole	Appointed by William E. Smith. Elected 1881, 1889, 1899. Chief justice by seniority rule. Died in office.
John B. Winslow	1891	1920	1907	1920	D. Taylor	Appointed by George Wilbur Peck. Chief justice by seniority rule. Died in office.
Silas U. Pinney	1892	1898			O. Cole	Elected 1891. Resigned.
Alfred W. Newman	1894	1898			W. P. Lyon	Elected 1893. Died in office.
Roujet D. Marshall	1895	1918			H. S. Orton	Appointed by William H. Upham. Elected 1897, 1907. Lost election in 1917.
Charles V. Bardeen	1898	1903			A. W. Newman	Appointed by Edward Scofield. Died in office.
Joshua Eric Dodge	1898	1910			S. U. Pinney	Appointed by Edward Scofield. Elected 1899, 1901. Resigned.
Robert G. Siebecker	1903	1922	1920	1922	C. V. Bardeen	Appointed by Robert M. La Follette. Chief justice by seniority rule. Died in office.
James C. Kerwin	1905	1921			New seat	Elected 1904. Died in office.
William H. Timlin	1907	1916			New seat	Elected 1906. Died in office.
Robert McKee Bashford	1908	1908			J. B. Cassoday	Appointed by James O. Davidson. Lost election in 1908.
John Barnes	1908	1916			R. M. Bashford	Elected 1908, 1909. Resigned.
Aad J. Vinje	1910	1929	1922	1929	J. E. Dodge	Appointed by James O. Davidson. Elected 1911, 1921. Chief justice by seniority rule. Died in office.
Marvin B. Rosenberry	1916	1950	1929	1950	J. Barnes	Appointed by Emanuel L. Philipp. Elected 1919, 1929, 1939. Chief justice by seniority rule.
Franz C. Eschweiler	1916	1929			W. H. Timlin	Elected 1916; appointed to begin early. Re-elected 1916. Died in office.
Walter C. Owen	1918	1934			R. D. Marshall	Elected 1917, 1927. Died in office.
Burr W. Jones	1920	1926			J. B. Winslow	Appointed by Emanuel L. Philipp. Elected 1922.
Christian Doerfler	1921	1929			J. C. Kerwin	Appointed by John J. Blaine. Resigned.
Charles H. Crownhart	1922	1930			R. G. Siebecker	Appointed by John J. Blaine. Elected 1923. Died in office.
E. Ray Stevens	1926	1930			B. W. Jones	Elected 1925. Died in office.
Chester A. Fowler	1929	1948			A. J. Vinje	Appointed by Walter J. Kohler Sr. Elected 1930, 1931, 1941. Died in office.
Oscar M. Fritz	1929	1954	1950	1954	C. Doerfler	Appointed by Walter J. Kohler Sr. Elected 1934, 1944. Chief justice by seniority rule. Resigned.
Edward T. Fairchild	1929	1957	1954	1957	F. C. Eschweiler	Appointed by Walter J. Kohler Sr. Elected 1936, 1946. Chief justice by seniority rule.
John D. Wickhem	1930	1949			C. H. Crownhart	Appointed by Walter J. Kohler Sr. Elected 1933, 1943. Died in office.
George B. Nelson	1930	1942			E. R. Stevens	Appointed by Walter J. Kohler Sr. Elected 1935.
Theodore G. Lewis	1934	1934			W. C. Owen	Appointed by Albert G. Schmedeman. Died in office.
Joseph Martin	1934	1946			T. G. Lewis	Appointed by Albert G. Schmedeman. Elected 1937. Died in office.
Elmer E. Barlow	1942	1948			G. B. Nelson	Appointed by Julius P. Heil (after Heil had lost re-election). Elected 1945. Died in office.
James Ward Rector	1946	1947			J. Martin	Appointed by Walter Samuel Goodland. Lost election in 1947.
Henry P. Hughes	1948	1951			J. W. Rector	Elected in 1947. Resigned.
John E. Martin	1948	1962	1957	1962	C. A. Fowler	Appointed by Oscar Rennebohm. Elected 1950, 1951. Chief justice by seniority rule.
Grover L. Broadfoot	1948	1962	1962	1962	E. E. Barlow	Appointed by Oscar Rennebohm. Elected 1952, 1955. Chief justice by seniority rule. Died in office.
Timothy Brown	1949	1964	1962	1964	J. D. Wickhem	Appointed by Oscar Rennebohm. Elected 1953. Chief justice by seniority rule.
Edward J. Gehl	1950	1956			M. B. Rosenberry	Elected in 1949. Died in office.
George R. Currie	1951	1968	1964	1968	H. P. Hughes	Appointed by Walter J. Kohler Jr. Elected in 1957. Chief justice by seniority rule. Lost re-election in 1967.
Roland J. Steinle	1954	1958			O. M. Fritz	Appointed by Walter J. Kohler Jr. Elected 1954. Resigned.
Emmert L. Wingert	1956	1959			E. J. Gehl	Appointed by Walter J. Kohler Jr. Lost election in 1958.
Thomas E. Fairchild	1957	1966			E. T. Fairchild	Elected 1956, 1966. Resigned; appointed judge, U.S. 7th Circuit.
E. Harold Hallows	1958	1974	1968	1974	R. J. Steinle	Appointed by Vernon Wallace Thomson. Elected 1959, 1969. Chief justice by seniority rule. Resigned.
William H. Dieterich	1959	1964			E. L. Wingert	Elected 1958. Died in office.
Myron L. Gordon	1962	1967			J. E. Martin	Elected 1961. Resigned; appointed U.S. dist. judge, E.D.Wis.
Horace W. Wilkie	1962	1976	1974	1976	G. L. Broadfoot	Appointed by Gaylord Nelson. Elected 1964, 1974. Chief justice by seniority rule. Died in office.
Bruce F. Beilfuss	1964	1983	1976	1983	T. Brown	Elected 1963, 1973. Chief justice by seniority rule.
Nathan S. Heffernan	1964	1995	1983	1995	W. H. Dieterich	Appointed by John W. Reynolds Jr. Elected 1965, 1975, 1985. Chief justice by seniority rule.
Leo B. Hanley	1966	1978			T. E. Fairchild	Appointed by Warren P. Knowles. Elected 1968.
Connor Hansen	1967	1980			M. L. Gordon	Appointed by Warren P. Knowles. Elected 1970.
Robert W. Hansen	1967	1977			G. R. Currie	Elected 1967.
Roland B. Day	1974	1996	1995	1996	E. H. Hallows	Appointed by Patrick Lucey. Elected 1976, 1986. Chief justice by seniority rule.
Shirley S. Abrahamson	1976	2019	1996	2015	H. W. Wilkie	Appointed by Patrick Lucey. Elected 1979, 1989, 1999, 2009. Chief justice by seniority rule.
William G. Callow	1977	1992			R. W. Hansen	Elected 1977, 1987. Resigned.
John L. Coffey	1978	1982			L. B. Hanley	Elected 1978. Resigned; appointed judge, U.S. 7th circuit
Donald W. Steinmetz	1980	1999			C. Hansen	Elected 1980, 1990. Resigned.
Louis J. Ceci	1982	1993			J. L. Coffey	Appointed by Lee S. Dreyfus. Elected 1984.
William A. Bablitch	1983	2003			B. F. Beilfuss	Elected 1983, 1993.
Jon P. Wilcox	1992	2007			W. G. Callow	Appointed by Tommy Thompson. Elected 1997.
Janine P. Geske	1993	1998			L. J. Ceci	Appointed by Tommy Thompson. Elected 1994. Resigned.
Ann Walsh Bradley	1995	2025	2025	2025	N. Heffernan	Elected 1995, 2005, 2015. Chief justice by court majority.
N. Patrick Crooks	1996	2015			R. B. Day	Elected 1996, 2006. Died in office.
David T. Prosser	1998	2016			J. P. Geske	Appointed by Tommy Thompson. Elected 2001, 2011. Resigned.
Diane S. Sykes	1999	2004			D. W. Steinmetz	Appointed by Tommy Thompson. Elected 2000. Resigned; appointed judge, U.S. 7th circuit
Patience D. Roggensack	2003	2023	2015	2021	W. A. Bablitch	Elected 2003, 2013. Chief justice by court majority.
Louis B. Butler	2004	2008			D. S. Sykes	Appointed by Jim Doyle. Lost election in 2008.
Annette Ziegler	2007	Current	2021	2025	J. P. Wilcox	Elected 2007, 2017. Chief justice by court majority.
Michael Gableman	2008	2018			L. B. Butler	Elected 2008.
Rebecca Bradley	2015	2026			N. P. Crooks	Appointed by Scott Walker. Elected 2016.
Daniel Kelly	2016	2020			D. T. Prosser	Appointed by Scott Walker. Lost election in 2020.
Rebecca Dallet	2018	Current			M. Gableman	Elected 2018.
Brian Hagedorn	2019	Current			S. Abrahamson	Elected 2019.
Jill Karofsky	2020	Current	2025	Current	D. Kelly	Elected 2020. Chief justice by court majority.
Janet Protasiewicz	2023	Current			P. Roggensack	Elected 2023.
Susan M. Crawford	2025	Current			A. W. Bradley	Elected 2025.
Chris Taylor	2026	Current			R. Bradley	Elected 2026.

== Sources ==
- Trina E. Gray, Karen Leone de Nie, Jennifer Miller, and Amanda K. Todd, Portraits of Justice: The Wisconsin Supreme Court's First 150 Years, Second Edition (Wisconsin Historical Society Press, 2003).
