= James C. Kerwin =

American lawyer and judge, Justice of the Wisconsin Supreme Court

The Honorable James C. Kerwin
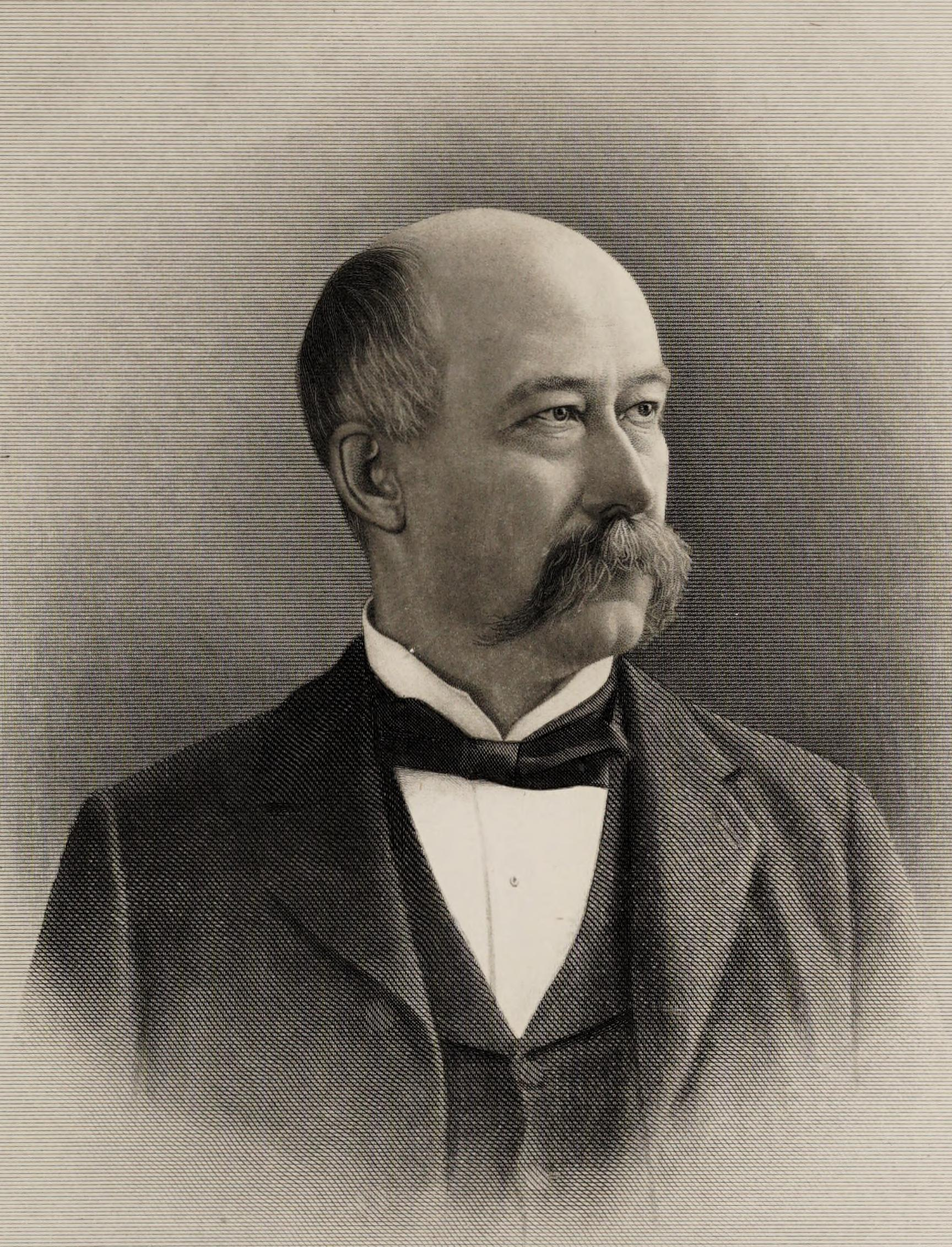

Justice of the Wisconsin Supreme Court
- In office January 1, 1905 – January 29, 1921
- Preceded by: New Seat
- Succeeded by: Christian Doerfler

Member of the University of Wisconsin Board of Regents
- In office February 1, 1901 – February 1, 1904
- Appointed by: Robert M. La Follette
- Preceded by: Orlando E. Clark
- Succeeded by: Florence Griswold Buckstaff

Personal details
- Born: James Charles Kerwin; May 14, 1850 Menasha, Wisconsin
- Died: January 29, 1921 (aged 70) Madison, Wisconsin
- Spouses: Helen Lawson; (m. 1877)
- Children: Jessie, Alice, Grace, Doris
- Parents: Michael Kerwin (father); Mary Buckley (mother)
- Relatives: Jim Sensenbrenner (great-grandson)
- Education: University of Wisconsin Law School
- Profession: lawyer, judge

James Charles Kerwin (May 14, 1850 – January 29, 1921) was an American lawyer and judge from Wisconsin. He was a justice of the Wisconsin Supreme Court for the last 16 years of his life (1905–1921).

== Biography ==
Born in Menasha, Wisconsin, he attended the common schools and graduated from Menasha High School. He studied at the University of Wisconsin Law School and, after his graduation in 1875, returned to Winnebago County, starting a law practice at Neenah. He was elected city attorney of Neenah, and served in that role for 12 years and was appointed to the University of Wisconsin Board of Regents in 1901 by Governor Robert M. La Follette.

In 1904, he was elected to the Wisconsin Supreme Court, taking office in January 1905. He was re-elected in 1914 and served until his death in 1921. He died unexpectedly at his home in Madison.

== Personal life and family ==
Kerwin married Helen Lawson in 1877. They had four daughters.

Jim Sensenbrenner, who represented Wisconsin for 42 years in the United States House of Representatives is the great-grandson of Justice Kerwin through his daughter, Grace, who married John Stilp Sensenbrenner of Neenah.

Legal offices
Preceded by New seat	Justice of the Wisconsin Supreme Court; January 1, 1905 – January 29, 1921	Succeeded by Christian Doerfler
