= Joshua Eric Dodge =

American judge (1854–1921)

Joshua E. Dodge
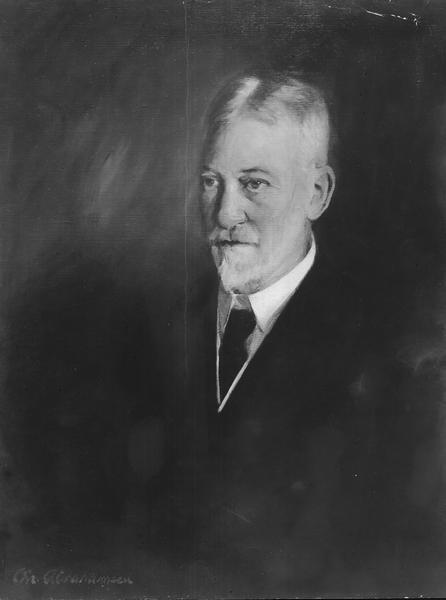
- Portrait from the Wisconsin Historical Society

Justice of the Wisconsin Supreme Court
- In office November 22, 1898 – September 1, 1910
- Appointed by: Edward Scofield
- Preceded by: Silas U. Pinney
- Succeeded by: Aad J. Vinje

Member of the Wisconsin State Assembly from the Racine district
- In office January 5, 1891 – January 2, 1893
- Preceded by: Alfred L. Buchan
- Succeeded by: Peter Nelson (1st dist.); Francis Reuschlein (2nd dist.)

Personal details
- Born: October 25, 1854 Arlington, Massachusetts, U.S.
- Died: May 2, 1921 (aged 66) Milwaukee County, Wisconsin, U.S.
- Party: Democratic
- Education: Grinnell College (B.A.); Boston University Law School (LL.B.)
- Profession: Lawyer, judge

Joshua Eric Dodge (October 25, 1854 – May 2, 1921) was an American lawyer, politician, and judge from the U.S. state of Wisconsin. He was a justice of the Wisconsin Supreme Court for 12 years (1898–1910). Earlier, he served as a United States Assistant Attorney General in the administration of President Grover Cleveland, and was a member of the Wisconsin State Assembly, representing Racine County in the 1891 session.

== Biography ==
Joshua Dodge was in Arlington, Massachusetts, in October 1854. He was raised and educated there, attending the Westford Academy, in Westford, Massachusetts, and then attending Iowa College, in Grinnell, Iowa. He graduated in 1875, then went on to study at the Boston University School of Law, graduating in 1877.

He was admitted to the bar in Boston, but moved to Wisconsin the following spring, settling in Racine, Wisconsin, in March 1878. He practiced law there for over a decade, and was involved in local politics with the Democratic Party. In 1890, he was elected to the Wisconsin State Assembly, running on the Democratic Party ticket.

Following his term in the Legislature, he was appointed to the national Board of Commissioners for the Promotion of Uniformity of Legislation in the United States. The following Summer, U.S. President Grover Cleveland appointed him United States Assistant Attorney General. He was confirmed in the Fall and served through the rest of the Cleveland administration, resigning in 1897 after his successor was confirmed.

In January 1898, he opened a new law office in Milwaukee in partnership with another young Racine lawyer, Samuel Field. The practice lasted only a short time, however, as Dodge was appointed to the Wisconsin Supreme Court in the Fall of 1898 by Governor Edward Scofield. Dodge replaced Silas U. Pinney, who was resigning due to poor health. Dodge was elected to finish Pinney's judicial term in the Spring 1899 election, and was subsequently elected to another ten-year term in April 1901. Dodge did not face an opponent in either election.

Dodge retired in the Fall of 1910, with a year left on his term. He died at his home in Milwaukee on May 2, 1921, after a long illness. Dodge never married and had no children.

== Electoral history ==
=== Wisconsin Assembly (1890) ===
Wisconsin Assembly, Racine District Election, 1890
Party	Candidate	Votes	%	±%
General Election, November 4, 1890
Democratic	Joshua E. Dodge	3,500	49.50%	+5.34%
Republican	Elias N. White	2,763	39.08%	−11.22%
Labor	A. B. Hayes	459	6.49%	
Prohibition	J. S. Blakie	348	4.92%	−0.62%
Plurality		737	10.42%	+4.28%
Total votes		7,070	100.0%	-11.40%
Democratic gain from Republican				

=== Wisconsin Supreme Court (1899, 1901) ===
1899 Wisconsin Supreme Court special election
Party	Candidate	Votes	%	±%
General Election, April 4, 1899
Nonpartisan	Joshua E. Dodge (incumbent)	103,372	99.06%	
	Scattering	982	0.94%	
Total votes		104,354	100.0%	

1901 Wisconsin Supreme Court election
Party	Candidate	Votes	%	±%
General Election, April 2, 1901
Nonpartisan	Joshua E. Dodge (incumbent)	130,161	99.06%	
	Scattering	3,651	2.73%	
Total votes		133,812	100.0%	

Wisconsin State Assembly
Preceded by Alfred L. Buchan	Member of the Wisconsin State Assembly from the Racine district January 5, 1891 – January 2, 1893	Succeeded by Peter Nelson (1st dist.); Francis Reuschlein (2nd dist.)
Legal offices
Preceded by Silas U. Pinney	Justice of the Wisconsin Supreme Court; November 22, 1898 – September 10, 1910	Succeeded by Aad J. Vinje
