= 1918 Wisconsin Supreme Court special election =

- April 2, 1918

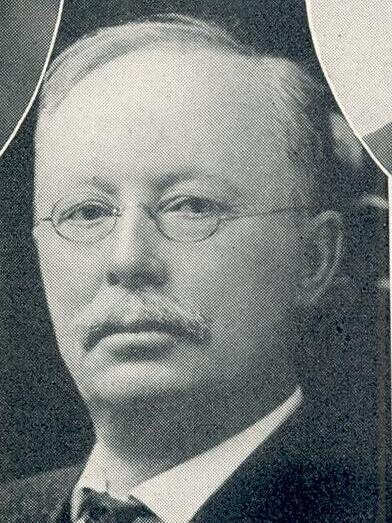
Candidate	Marvin B. Rosenberry	Charles H. Crownhart
Popular vote	212,727	159,190
Percentage	57.18%	42.79%
- County results Rosenberry: 50–60% 60–70% 70–80% Crownhart: 50–60% 60–70%
Justice before election
Marvin B. Rosenberry
Elected Justice
Marvin B. Rosenberry

The 1918 Wisconsin Supreme Court special election was a special election held on Tuesday, April 2, 1918, to elect a justice to the Wisconsin Supreme Court. Incumbent justice Marvin B. Rosenberry (who had been appointed to in 1916 to fill a vacancy) won re-election over Charles H. Crownhart (the former chairman of the Wisconsin Industrial Commission).

The election coincided with a special U.S. Senate election in the state, which garnered much greater public interest that the court election.

== Results ==
1918 Wisconsin Supreme Court special election
Party	Candidate	Votes	%
General Election (April 2, 1918)
Nonpartisan	Marvin B. Rosenberry (incumbent)	212,727	57.18
Nonpartisan	Charles H. Crownhart	159,190	42.79
Write-ins	scattering	129	0.03
Plurality		53,537	14.39
Total votes		372,046	100
