= River Styx, Ohio =

- Unincorporated community
- Location within Ohio Location within the United States
- Coordinates: 41°03′25″N 81°47′59″W
- Country: United States
- State: Ohio
- County: Medina
- Township: Guilford
- Elevation: 1,020 ft (310 m)

Population (2016)
  - Total: 39
- Time zone: UTC-5 (Eastern (EST))
  - Summer (DST): UTC-4 (EDT)
- ZIP Codes: 44256 (Medina); 44281 (Wadsworth)
- Area codes: 234 & 330
- GNIS feature ID: 1071119

River Styx is an unincorporated community in Medina County, Ohio, United States. River Styx is located 4.5 miles (7.2 km) from Wadsworth and 6.5 miles (10.5 km) from Medina.

A post office called River Styx was established in 1828, and remained in operation until it was discontinued in 1905. The community and the nearby Styx River derive their names from the Styx, a river in Greek mythology. The gloomy character of a nearby swamp caused the name to be selected. River Styx has been noted for its unusual place name.

There is a cemetery that was established as a pioneer homestead graveyard in 1821.

== Notable person ==
- Marvin B. Rosenberry, Chief Justice of the Wisconsin Supreme Court
