= John B. Winslow =

American judge, 10th Chief Justice of the Wisconsin Supreme Court

The Honorable John B. Winslow
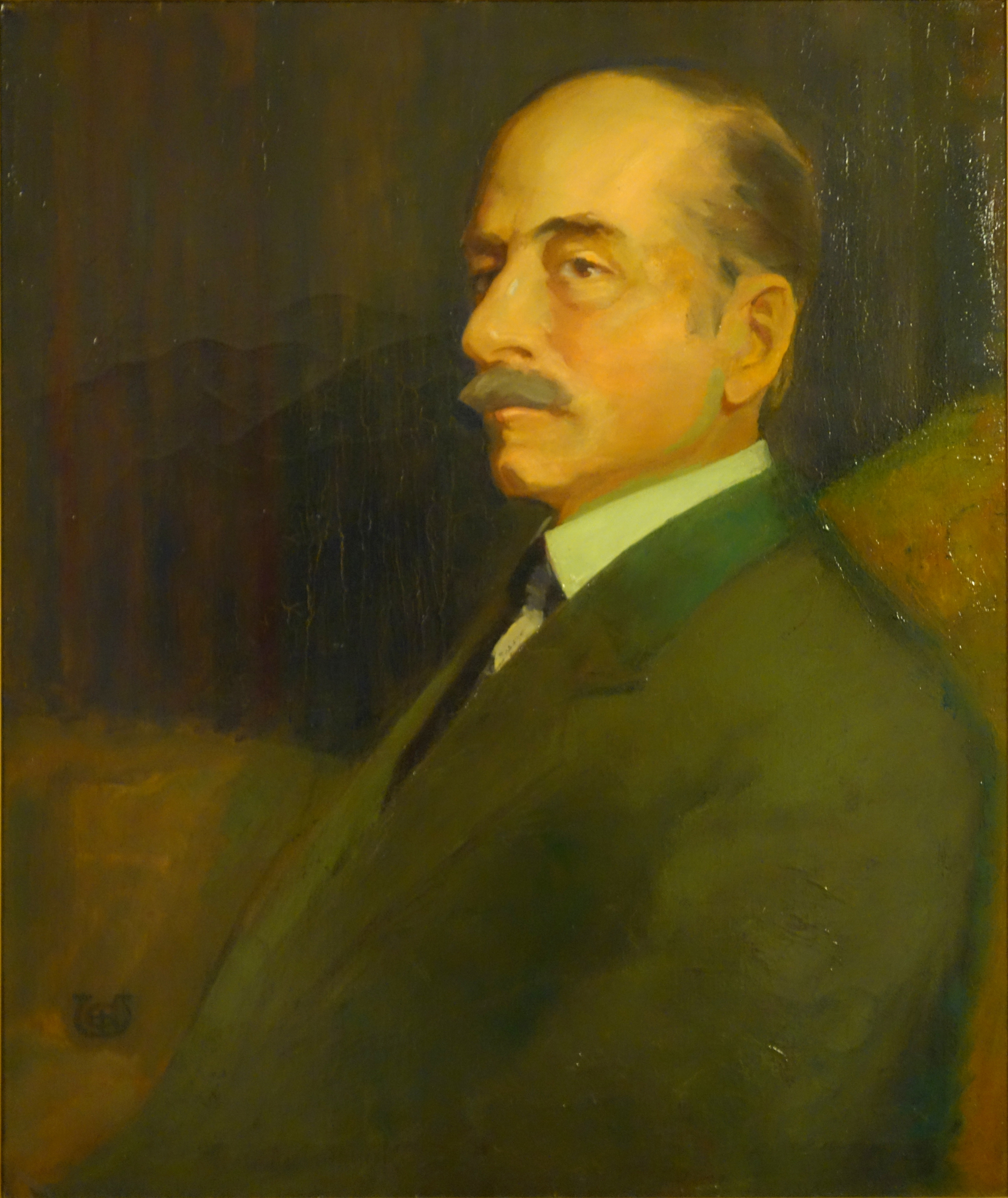

10th Chief Justice of the Wisconsin Supreme Court
- In office December 30, 1907 – July 13, 1920
- Preceded by: John B. Cassoday
- Succeeded by: Robert G. Siebecker

Justice of the Wisconsin Supreme Court
- In office May 4, 1891 – July 13, 1920
- Appointed by: George Wilbur Peck
- Preceded by: David Taylor
- Succeeded by: Burr W. Jones

Wisconsin Circuit Court Judge for the 1st circuit
- In office January 1, 1884 – May 4, 1891
- Preceded by: John T. Wentworth
- Succeeded by: Frank M. Fish

City Attorney of Racine, Wisconsin
- In office 1879–1883

Personal details
- Born: John Bradley Winslow; October 4, 1851 Nunda, New York, U.S.
- Died: July 13, 1920 (aged 68) Madison, Wisconsin, U.S.
- Resting place: Forest Hill Cemetery, Madison, Wisconsin
- Party: Democratic
- Spouse: Agnes Clancy (m. 1881–1920)
- Children: 2 sons, 4 daughters
- Education: Racine College; University of Wisconsin Law School
- Profession: lawyer, judge

John Bradley Winslow (October 4, 1851 – July 13, 1920) was an American lawyer and jurist. He was the 10th Chief Justice of the Wisconsin Supreme Court, serving from 1908 until his death in 1920. Before being appointed to the Wisconsin Supreme Court, Winslow served as a Wisconsin circuit court judge for seven years and was city attorney of Racine, Wisconsin, from 1879 to 1883.

== Early life and education ==
Winslow was born in Nunda, New York. He moved with his parents to Racine, Wisconsin, in 1855. Winslow graduated from Racine College in 1871 and began studying law at the offices of E. O. Hand. He continued his study at the law office of Fuller & Dyer. In September 1874, he entered the University of Wisconsin Law School and graduated with his law degree in 1875. After graduating from law school, he returned to Racine and established a successful legal practice.

== Judicial career ==
For many years, Winslow was a law partner with Joseph V. Quarles, who had been Mayor of Kenosha, Wisconsin, in 1876–1877, and would later become a U.S. senator and federal judge. Winslow also served as Racine City Attorney from 1879 until 1883.

In 1883, Winslow challenged incumbent Wisconsin circuit court judge John T. Wentworth. Winslow narrowly defeated Wentworth in the April election and assumed office in January 1884 as judge of the 1st circuit. At the time, the 1st circuit comprised the counties of Racine, Kenosha, and Walworth. He was subsequently re-elected without opposition in 1889.

In May 1891, following the death of Justice David Taylor, Governor George Wilbur Peck appointed Judge Winslow to the Wisconsin Supreme Court. He was unopposed when, in April 1892, he was elected to fill the remainder of Taylor's term. He was elected to a full term on the court in 1895, defeating a challenge from 5th circuit Judge George Clementson, and was subsequently re-elected without opposition in 1905 and 1915.

Portrait photograph of Winslow, taken in the 1910s

Following the death of Chief Justice John B. Cassoday, on December 30, 1907, as the next most senior member of the court, Justice Winslow became the 10th Chief Justice of the Wisconsin Supreme Court. He served as chief justice until his death in July 1920.

=== Winslow and Women's Suffrage ===
In 1887, when Winslow was a circuit judge, Wisconsin law permitted women to vote but only in elections "pertaining to school matters." At the spring election that year Racine officials rejected the ballot cast by Olympia Brown of Racine, the leader of Wisconsin Women's Suffrage Association, because she had voted for all municipal offices. Brown argued that her ballot should be counted because all municipal offices pertained to schools. Winslow agreed but the Wisconsin Supreme Court reversed his decision, holding women could not vote except on ballots limited to school offices. The state legislature did not authorize special ballots until 1901.

=== Winslow and Judicial Non-Partisanship ===
Winslow was a Democrat in a predominantly Republican state. Wisconsin judicial elections were officially non-partisan but judges' political affiliations were well known. Even though Winslow was well respected he faced Republican opposition in several elections and was sometimes reelected by narrow margins. He consistently urged greater separation of judicial elections from partisan politics.

Winslow's appointment to the Supreme Court, incidentally, marked the first time that a governor of one party (Republican George Wilbur Peck) had appointed a justice from the opposing political party to the Wisconsin Supreme Court. This built upon precedent set in 1890, when Republican governor William D. Hoard had been the first to appoint a judge of the opposing party to a Wisconsin Circuit Court (by appointing Democrat Robert G. Siebecker to the 9th circuit). Several years after Winslow's appointment, Democratic governor Edward Scofield would continue this practice by appointing Republican Willis C. Silverthorn to a Circuit Court judgeship.

=== Winslow and Progressive Attacks on Judges ===
Winslow served on Wisconsin's Supreme Court throughout the Progressive Era. During the Progressive Era many state courts struck down reform laws sponsored by the Progressives, using the substantive due process doctrine. Under the doctrine, courts gave little deference to legislative policy decisions: they protected individual liberty and property rights and individuals' rights to contract freely against governmental interference and interpreted government's power to promote the public welfare narrowly. Between 1902 and 1908 Wisconsin's Supreme Court struck down several reform laws including a law prohibiting "yellow dog" contracts requiring workers to agree not to join a union as a condition of employment and a law to improve tenement housing in Milwaukee.

Progressives became increasingly angry at courts that struck down reform laws. Beginning about 1910 they advocated changes to the judiciary, including recall of judges by popular vote. Theodore Roosevelt made judicial recall a central part of his 1912 presidential campaign.

After Winslow became Wisconsin's chief justice in 1907, he became concerned about the growing hostility toward judges. In 1909 he began a campaign to educate Progressives about judges' behavior and to persuade conservatives that Progressive calls for reform deserved serious consideration. In a 1909 address to the Milwaukee Loyal Legion, Winslow explained that judges "are sworn to protect and support both the federal and state constitutions as they are, not as [Progressives] would like to see them." He also urged conservatives to consider that "the rights and privileges once deemed essential to the perfect liberty of the individual are often found to stand in the way of the public welfare, and to breed wrong and injustice to the community at large." Winslow continued his campaign and gained a national audience through speeches and articles in popular magazines and law journals. He was several times considered for nomination to the U.S. Supreme Court but was not nominated.

== Winslow's Contributions to Progressivism ==
Winslow and his fellow justice Roujet D. Marshall engaged in a continuing debate over the proper interpretation of the federal and state constitutions in light of changing social needs. Marshall argued that "preservation of liberty is given precedent [even] over the establishment of government" and that courts must ensure that reform laws did not infringe it. A reform law, he said, cannot "be conclusively legitimate merely because it promotes, however trifling in degree, public health, comfort, or convenience." Winslow and Marshall continued their debate in a series of cases in which Winslow's philosophy ultimately prevailed:

- In Borgnis v. Falk Co. (1911), the Supreme Court upheld Wisconsin's new workers compensation law over objections that it violated employers’ liberty and property rights by forcing them to pay benefits even where they were not at fault. Winslow argued that constitutions must be interpreted flexibly in order to meet changing social conditions: "When an eighteenth century constitution forms the charter of liberty of a twentieth century government must its general provisions be construed and interpreted by an eighteenth century mind in the light of eighteenth century conditions and ideals? Clearly not. This were to command the race to halt in its progress, to stretch the state upon a veritable bed of Procrustes."
- Marshall agreed that the workers compensation law was unconstitutional but he disagreed with Winslow's philosophy: "If the constitution is to efficiently endure, the idea that it is capable of being re-squared, from time to time, to fit new legislative or judicial notions of necessities ... must be combated whenever and wherever advanced."
- In the Forestry Case (1915), the Court struck down a law that authorized the state to spend money to acquire land in northern Wisconsin, once the site of a huge white-pine forest that had been cut down by loggers during the nineteenth century, and turn it back into forest. Marshall held that the law violated a clause in Wisconsin's constitution that prohibited state financing of "works of internal improvement," and he argued that the law impermissibly interfered with private property and liberty rights. Winslow believed the law was invalid because of technical defects but he disagreed with Marshall that reforestation was an "internal improvement," and affirmed that land conservation was a matter of public welfare that the state could undertake.
- In 1911 Wisconsin Progressives enacted a law creating an Industrial Commission and giving it comprehensive power to regulate workplace conditions affecting safety. The law was the first in the nation to create an agency with such broad powers. In State v. Lange Canning Co. (1916), the Supreme Court struck down a portion of the law directing the agency to establish maximum working hours for women; it reasoned that the legislature had impermissibly delegated its policymaking powers to unelected agency officials. Winslow dissented, and when the state asked for a rehearing he was able to persuade his colleagues to change their minds. They now upheld the law, agreeing with Winslow that the legislature had set policy by requiring that workplaces be safe, and that when the Commission set women's working hours it was merely making a determination of fact as to what hours best promoted safety.

Marshall was defeated for reelection in 1917 largely because his decision in the Forestry Case was unpopular. By the time Winslow died in 1920, his philosophy of flexible constitutionalism and adaptation to modern conditions was generally accepted in Wisconsin. Several years later Walter C. Owen, the justice who replaced Marshall, stated for the Supreme Court that "It is thoroughly established in this country that the rights preserved to the individual by … constitutional provisions are held in subordination to the rights of society."

== Personal life and family ==
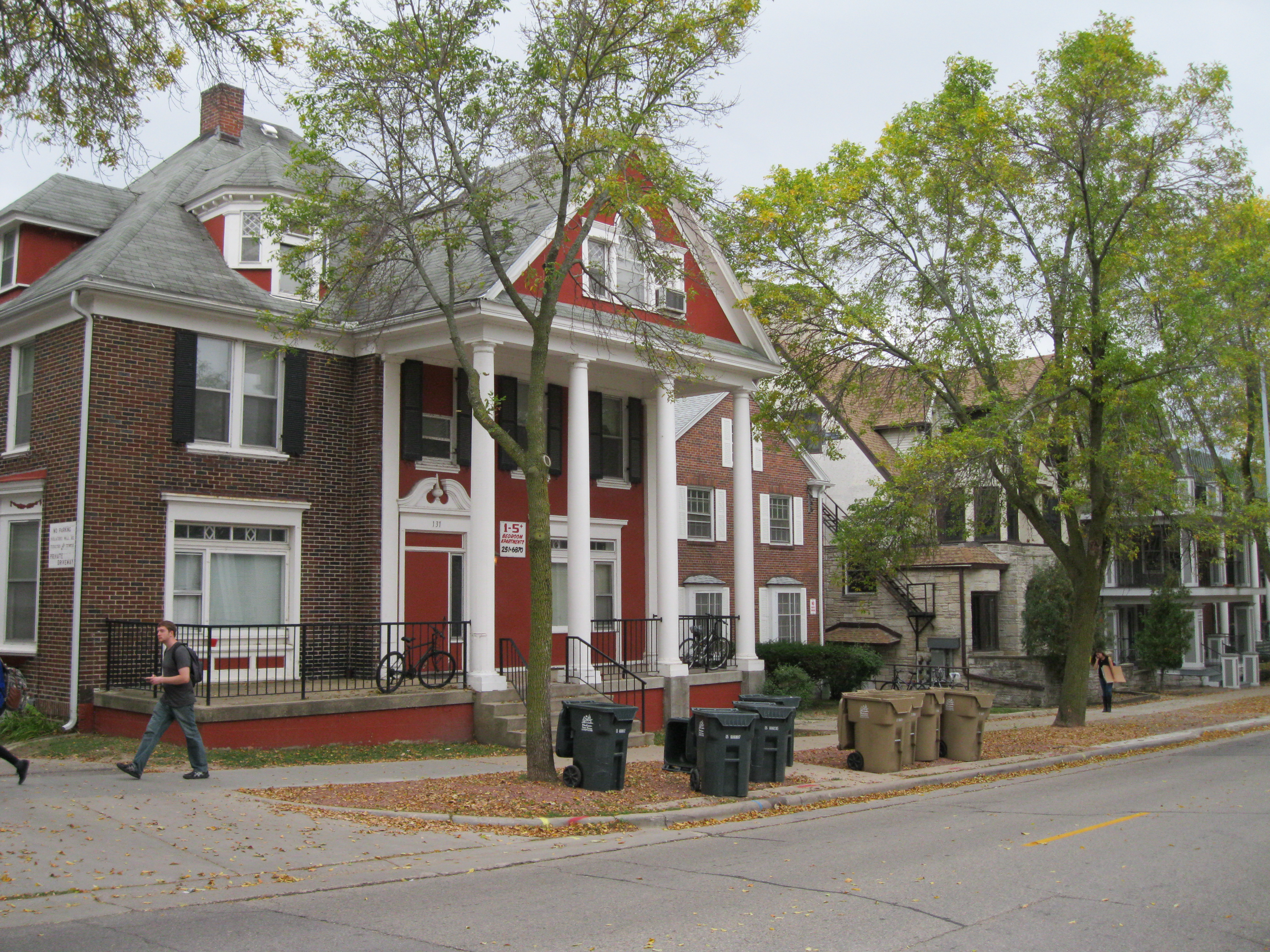
The Winslow House in Madison

John B. Winslow was the only son of Horatio G. Winslow and Emily Winslow (née Bradley). He was a direct descendant of Kenelm Winslow, brother of Edward Winslow, a Mayflower colonist and a governor of Plymouth Colony.

John B. Winslow married Agnes Clancy on January 19, 1881. They had two sons and four daughters. Their former home in Madison, Wisconsin, is located in what is now the Langdon Street Historic District. Judge Winslow died at this home in Madison on July 13, 1920, after a protracted illness.

== Books ==
- Winslow, John Bradley (1912). The Story of a Great Court. Chicago: T. H. Flood & Company. ISBN 9780722202937.

Legal offices
Preceded by John T. Wentworth	Wisconsin Circuit Court Judge for the 1st circuit January 1, 1884 – May 4, 1891	Succeeded by Frank M. Fish
Preceded by David Taylor	Justice of the Wisconsin Supreme Court; May 4, 1891 – July 13, 1920	Succeeded by Burr W. Jones
Preceded by John B. Cassoday	Chief Justice of the Wisconsin Supreme Court; December 30, 1907 – July 13, 1920	Succeeded by Robert G. Siebecker
