= John B. Cassoday =

American lawyer, politician, and judge (1830–1907)

The Honorable John B. Cassoday
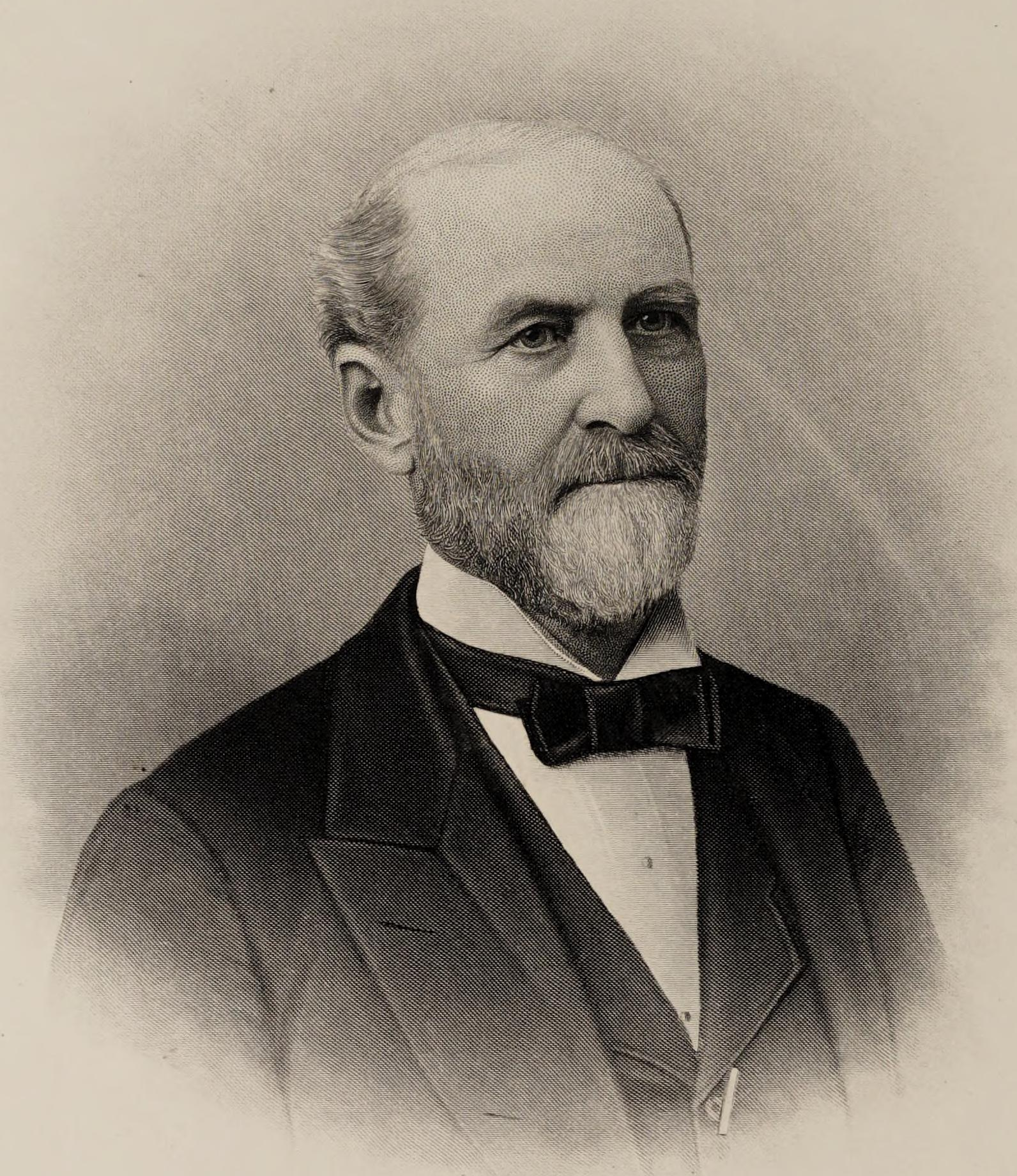

9th Chief Justice of the Wisconsin Supreme Court
- In office July 4, 1895 – December 30, 1907
- Preceded by: Harlow S. Orton
- Succeeded by: John B. Winslow

Justice of the Wisconsin Supreme Court
- In office November 11, 1880 – December 30, 1907
- Appointed by: William E. Smith
- Preceded by: Edward George Ryan
- Succeeded by: Robert McKee Bashford

27th Speaker of the Wisconsin Assembly
- In office January 10, 1877 – January 9, 1878
- Preceded by: Sam Fifield
- Succeeded by: Augustus Barrows

Member of the Wisconsin State Assembly from the Rock 2nd district
- In office January 1, 1877 – January 1, 1878
- Preceded by: Fenner Kimball
- Succeeded by: Charles R. Gleason

Member of the Wisconsin State Assembly from the Rock 5th district
- In office January 1, 1865 – January 1, 1866
- Preceded by: Hamilton Richardson
- Succeeded by: Allen C. Bates

Personal details
- Born: John Bolivar Cassoday; July 7, 1830 Herkimer County, New York, U.S.
- Died: December 30, 1907 (aged 77)
- Resting place: Forest Hill Cemetery; Madison, Wisconsin
- Party: Republican; National Union (1865)
- Spouses: Mary Prentice Spaulding; (died 1900)
- Children: Belle Ellsworth (Wheelock)^{(b. 1862; died 1931)}
- Profession: lawyer, judge
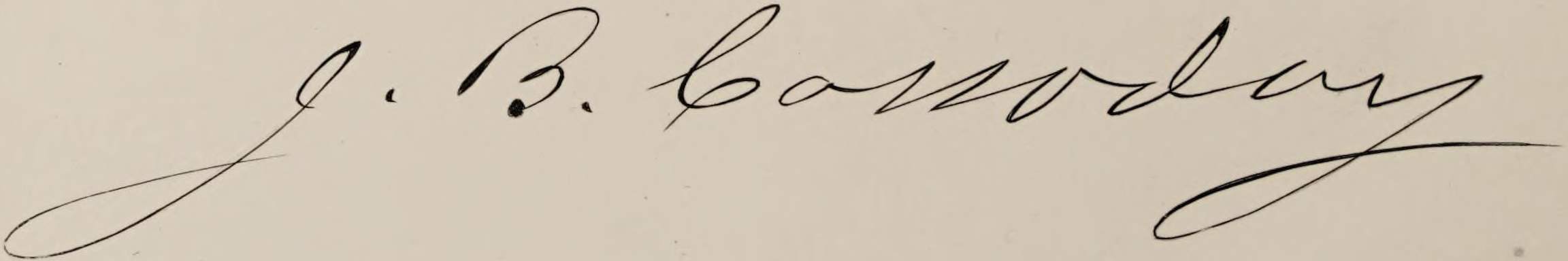
- Signature

John Bolivar Cassoday (July 7, 1830 – December 30, 1907) was an American lawyer, politician, and judge. He was the 9th Chief Justice of the Wisconsin Supreme Court and the 27th Speaker of the Wisconsin State Assembly.

== Biography ==
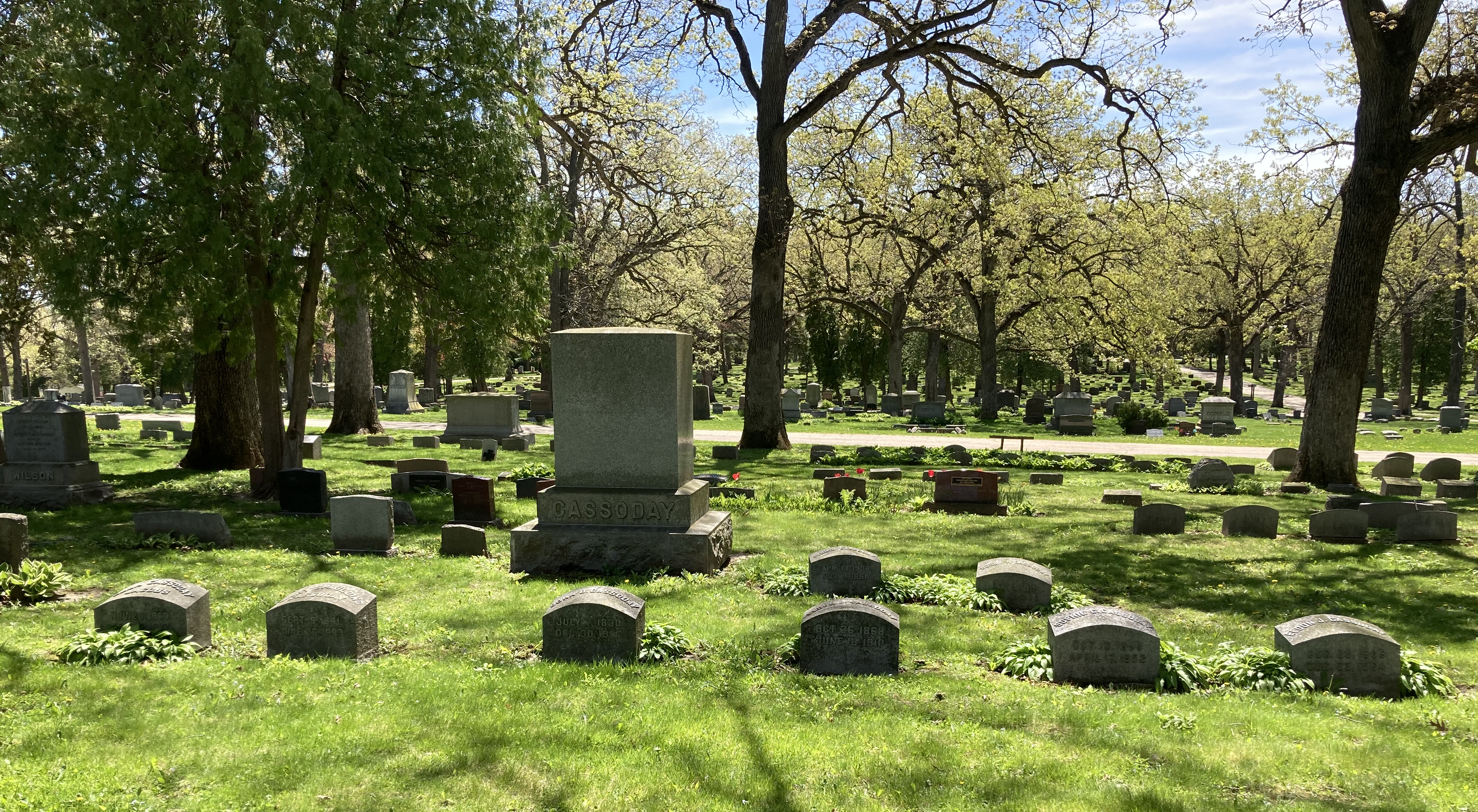
Cassoday's grave at Forest Hill Cemetery

Born in Herkimer County, New York, he moved with his widowed mother to Tioga County, Pennsylvania, at age 3. After one year at the University of Michigan, he attended the Albany Law School. He moved to Janesville, Wisconsin, in July 1857 and established a law practice.

Politically, Cassoday was a Republican. He was a delegate from Wisconsin to the 1864 National Union National Convention, which nominated Abraham Lincoln for re-election, and was also a candidate for Wisconsin State Assembly that year on Lincoln's National Union ticket. He was elected to represent Janesville in the Assembly for the 1865 session, and was later elected to the 1877 session. In the 1877 session, he was chosen as Speaker by a vote of the Assembly. In 1880, he was chairman of the Wisconsin delegation to the 1880 Republican National Convention.

Later in 1880, Cassoday was appointed to the Wisconsin Supreme Court by Governor William E. Smith, to fill the vacancy caused after Orsamus Cole was promoted by Cassody to the chief justice seat (after the death of Chief Justice Edward George Ryan). Cassoday was elected to remain in office in 1881, and was re-elected in 1889 and 1899. In 1895, Chief Justice Harlow S. Orton died in office. Since the court had moved to a seniority system for selecting its chief justices, and Cassoday was the next-most senior member of the court, Cassoday became the chief justice. He served twelve years as chief justice until his death in 1907. He was buried at Forest Hill Cemetery in Madison.

John B. Cassoday is the namesake of Cassoday, Kansas.

Political offices
Preceded by Sam Fifield	Speaker of the Wisconsin State Assembly; 1877 – 1878	Succeeded by Augustus Barrows
Legal offices
Preceded by Edward George Ryan	Justice of the Wisconsin Supreme Court; 1880 – 1907	Succeeded by Robert McKee Bashford
Preceded by Harlow S. Orton	Chief Justice of the Wisconsin Supreme Court; 1895 – 1907	Succeeded by John B. Winslow
