= Lois Carter Kimball Mathews Rosenberry =

American historian and educator

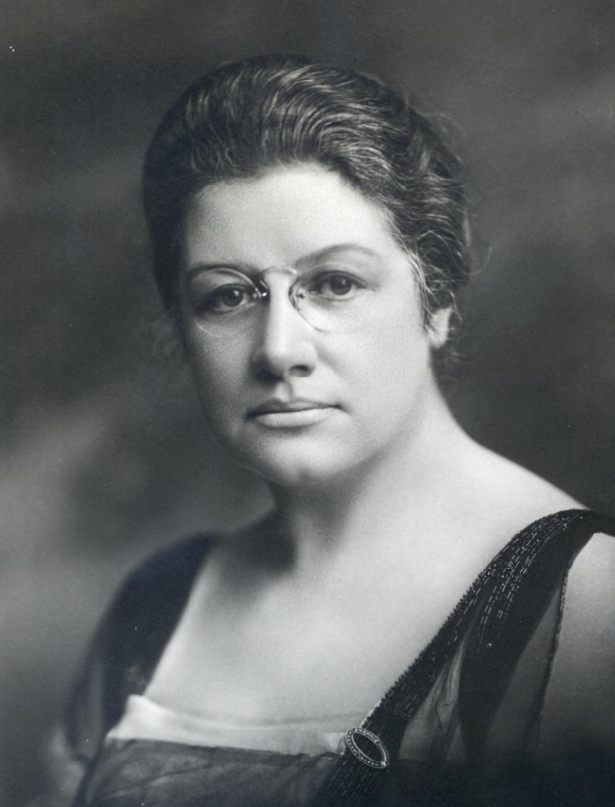
- Born: Lois Carter Kimball; January 30, 1873; Cresco, Iowa
- Died: September 1, 1958 (aged 85); Madison, Wisconsin
- Notable work: The Expansion of New England
- Spouse: George Reynolds Mathews (m. 1897–1899) Marvin B. Rosenberry (m. 1918–1958)

Lois Carter Kimball Mathews Rosenberry ( 1873 – 1958) was an American educator, writer and historian.

== Biography ==
Rosenberry née Kimball was born on January 30, 1873, in Cresco, Iowa. She studied at the State Normal School in Winona, Minnesota, Stanford University, and Radcliffe College. She was Dean of Women at the University of Wisconsin from 1911 through 1918.

In 1918 she married Marvin B. Rosenberry.

Rosenberry served as president of the Association of Collegiate Alumnae from 1917 through 1921 when it became the American Association of University Women.

Rosenberry was the author of several books including The Dean of Women published in 1915, and The History of the American Association of University Women, 1881-1931 (co-authored with Marion Talbot) published in 1931.

Rosenberry died on September 1, 1958, in Madison, Wisconsin.
