= Connor Hansen =

American judge (1913–1987)

The Honorable Connor T. Hansen
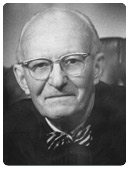

Justice of the Wisconsin Supreme Court
- In office March 13, 1967 – July 31, 1980
- Appointed by: Warren P. Knowles
- Preceded by: Myron L. Gordon
- Succeeded by: Donald W. Steinmetz

County Judge of Eau Claire County, Wisconsin, Branch 1
- In office June 3, 1958 – March 13, 1967
- Appointed by: Vernon Wallace Thomson
- Preceded by: Merrill R. Farr
- Succeeded by: Thomas H. Barland

District Attorney of Eau Claire County, Wisconsin
- In office January 1, 1939 – June 18, 1943
- Preceded by: Victor O. Tronsdal
- Succeeded by: John D. Kaiser

Chairman of the Eau Claire County, Wisconsin, Board of Supervisors
- In office April 1949 – April 1951
- Preceded by: George H. Zetzman
- Succeeded by: Henry Graff

Member of the Eau Claire County, Wisconsin, Board of Supervisors
- In office April 15, 1947 – January 1952

Personal details
- Born: Connor Theodore Hansen; November 1, 1913 Freeman, South Dakota
- Died: August 21, 1987 (aged 73) University of Wisconsin Hospital; Madison, Wisconsin
- Resting place: Rock Lake Cemetery; Lake Mills, Wisconsin
- Party: Republican
- Spouse: Annette Ferry (died 2006)
- Children: Annette, Peter, David, Jane
- Education: Eau Claire State Teachers College (B.S.); University of Wisconsin Law School (J.D.)

Connor Theodore Hansen (November 1, 1913 – August 21, 1987) was an American lawyer, jurist, and Republican politician from Eau Claire, Wisconsin. He was a justice of the Wisconsin Supreme Court for 13 years, from 1967 until 1980. Earlier in his career, he served as county judge and district attorney of Eau Claire County, and worked as a special agent of the Federal Bureau of Investigation during World War II.

== Early life and education ==
He was born in Freeman, South Dakota, and was educated in the Eau Claire public schools, graduating from Eau Claire High School. He earned his bachelor's degree from the Eau Claire State Teachers College in 1934 (now the University of Wisconsin–Eau Claire), and immediately went on to University of Wisconsin Law School, where he earned his J.D. in 1937.

== Legal and political career ==
After briefly practicing law in Eau Claire, in 1938, Hansen declared his candidacy for district attorney of Eau Claire County. Despite being only 24 years old, Hansen won the Republican Party primary election, defeating former district attorney Curt W. Augustine, and went on to win the general election, defeating incumbent district attorney, Progressive Victor O. Tronsdal. Hansen was subsequently re-elected in 1940 and 1942.

A few months into his third term, however, he resigned as district attorney to accept a position as special agent with the Federal Bureau of Investigation. He completed his service with the FBI and returned to Eau Claire in late 1944, and formed a law partnership with his former assistant district attorney, John D. Kaiser.

In 1945, Hansen returned to public office when he was appointed circuit court commissioner for Eau Claire County by 19th circuit judge Clarence E. Rinehard, and would continue in that role until his appointment as County Judge in 1958. He was elected to office as a member of the Eau Claire County Board of Supervisors in 1947, and would remain on the board until 1952, serving as chairman in 1949 and 1950.

He was a strong supporter of former Minnesota Governor Harold Stassen in his campaign for the Republican nomination for president in 1948, and was elected as a Stassen delegate to the 1948 Republican National Convention. That same year, he attempted a run for United States House of Representatives in Wisconsin's 9th congressional district. He fell far short of incumbent Merlin Hull in the Republican primary, however.

== Judicial career ==
Due to his role as circuit court commissioner, between 1945 and 1957, Hansen frequently served as acting County Judge in place of Judge Merrill R. Farr, when he was recused from cases or otherwise absent. In 1958, Hansen ran against Judge Farr for the Wisconsin Circuit Court seat in the newly created 24th circuit, but lost badly in the April general election. With Judge Farr vacating the County Judge seat, however, Hansen was appointed as his replacement by Governor Vernon W. Thomson, taking office in June 1958. His appointment was overwhelmingly confirmed in the April 1959 election for a full term as county judge. He was unopposed seeking re-election in 1965.

In 1967, President Lyndon B. Johnson nominated Wisconsin Supreme Court Justice Myron L. Gordon for a newly created seat on the United States District Court for the Eastern District of Wisconsin. Following his confirmation in March, Wisconsin Governor Warren P. Knowles chose Judge Hansen as Gordon's successor on the state's highest court. His appointment received general praise from attorneys and lower court judges, particularly because it added a justice with probate court experience. He was subsequently elected to a full ten-year term in 1970, without opposition. Hansen was considered to be an ideological conservative.

== Personal life and family ==
Connor Hansen married Annette Phillips Ferry in on June 17, 1939. Annette was a great granddaughter of Jonathan Phillips, an early settler at Lake Mills, Wisconsin, and, at the time of the wedding, her family was known as one of the most prominent families in southern Wisconsin. Together, they had four children—Annette, Peter, David, and Jane.

Justice Hansen died at Madison's University Hospital on August 21, 1987.

== Electoral history ==
=== Eau Claire District Attorney (1938, 1940, 1942) ===
Year	Election	Date	Elected				Defeated				Total	Plurality
1938	Primary	Sep. 20	Connor T. Hansen	Republican	2,083	70.23%	Curt W. Augustine	Rep.	883	29.77%	2,966	1,200
1938	General	Nov. 8	Connor T. Hansen	Republican	6,980	55.72%	Victor O. Tronsdal (incumbent)	Prog.	5,546	44.28%	12,526	1,434
1940	General	Nov. 5	Connor T. Hansen (inc)	Republican	11,613	66.02%	Ray E. Wachs	Prog.	5,978	33.98%	17,591	5,635
1942	General	Nov. 3	Connor T. Hansen (inc)	Republican	7,003	73.60%	F. E. Yates	Prog.	2,512	26.40%	9,515	4,491

=== U.S. House of Representatives (1948) ===
Wisconsin's 9th Congressional District Election, 1948
Party	Candidate	Votes	%	±%
Republican Primary, September 21, 1948
Republican	Merlin Hull (incumbent)	25,243	60.99%	
Republican	Connor T. Hansen	14,071	34.00%	
Republican	Lynn Mason	2,073	5.01%	
Plurality		11,172	26.99%	
Total votes		41,387	100.0%	

=== Wisconsin Circuit Court (1958) ===
Wisconsin Circuit Court, 24th Circuit Election, 1958
Party	Candidate	Votes	%	±%
Nonpartisan Primary, March 4, 1958
Nonpartisan	Merrill R. Farr	4,847	55.06%	
Nonpartisan	Connor T. Hansen	2,452	27.85%	
Nonpartisan	William H. Frawley	1,504	17.09%	
Total votes		8,803	100.0%	
General Election, April 1, 1958
Nonpartisan	Merrill R. Farr	7,016	84.26%	
Nonpartisan	Connor T. Hansen	1,311	15.74%	
Plurality		5,705	68.51%	
Total votes		8,327	100.0%	

=== Eau Claire County Judge (1959) ===
Eau Claire County Judge Election, 1959
Party	Candidate	Votes	%	±%
General Election, April 7, 1959
Nonpartisan	Connor T. Hansen (incumbent)	7,822	85.56%	
Nonpartisan	Homs A. Schwahn	1,320	14.44%	
Plurality		6,502	71.12%	
Total votes		9,142	100.0%	

Legal offices
Preceded by Victor O. Tronsdal	District Attorney of Eau Claire County, Wisconsin; January 1, 1939 – June 18, 1943	Succeeded by John D. Kaiser
Preceded by Merrill R. Farr	County Judge of Eau Claire County, Wisconsin, Branch 1 June 3, 1958 – March 13, 1967	Succeeded by Thomas H. Barland
Preceded by Myron L. Gordon	Justice of the Wisconsin Supreme Court; March 13, 1967 – July 31, 1980	Succeeded by Donald W. Steinmetz
