= 1905 Wisconsin Supreme Court election =

- April 4, 1905
Candidate	John B. Winslow
Popular vote	131,574
Percentage	99.72%
Justice before election
John B. Winslow
Elected Justice
John B. Winslow

The 1905 Wisconsin Supreme Court election was held on April 4, 1905. It saw the re-election of incumbent justice John B. Winslow, who ran unopposed.

== Candidate ==
- John B. Winslow, incumbent justice

== Result ==
1905 Wisconsin Supreme Court election
Party	Candidate	Votes	%	±%
Nonpartisan	John B. Winslow (incumbent)	131,574	99.90	
write-in	scattering	137	0.10	
Total votes		131,711	100	
undervotes	blank	744		
