= Charles H. Crownhart =

American judge (1863–1930)

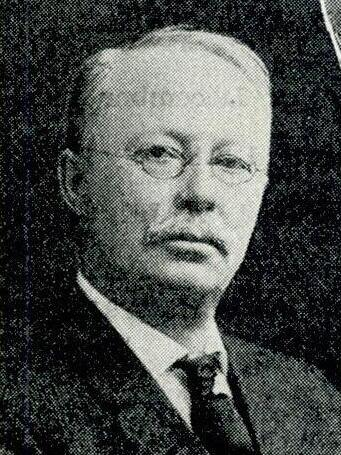
- Crownhart, circa 1929

Justice of the Wisconsin Supreme Court
- In office April 4, 1922 – May 2, 1930 (died)
- Appointed by: John J. Blaine
- Preceded by: Robert G. Siebecker
- Succeeded by: John D. Wickhem

Chairman of the Wisconsin Industrial Commission
- In office July 1, 1911 – June 30, 1915
- Preceded by: Position established
- Succeeded by: Joseph D. Beck

Chairman of the Republican Party of Wisconsin
- In office August 1910 – July 1911
- Preceded by: Edward A. Edmonds
- Succeeded by: George E. Scott

Personal details
- Born: April 16, 1863 Ashford, Wisconsin, U.S.
- Died: May 2, 1930 (aged 67) Madison, Wisconsin, U.S.
- Resting place: Forest Hill Cemetery, Madison
- Spouse: Jessie Elizabeth Evans (m. 1895–1930)
- Children: Jesse George Crownhart^{(b. 1896; died 1941)}; Charles Henry Crownhart Jr.^{(b. 1905; died 1974)}
- Education: River Falls Normal School; University of Wisconsin Law School
- Profession: Lawyer

Charles Henry Crownhart Sr. (April 16, 1863 – May 2, 1930) was an American lawyer, jurist, and progressive Republican politician from Wisconsin. He was a justice of the Wisconsin Supreme Court from 1922 until his death in 1930. Earlier, he served as revisor of Wisconsin's statutes (1919–1922), chairman of the Wisconsin Industrial Commission (1911–1915), chairman of the Republican Party of Wisconsin (1910–1911), and district attorney of Douglas County, Wisconsin (1901–1905). He was a friend, legal advisor, and campaign manager for progressive governor and U.S. senator Robert M. "Fighting Bob" La Follette.

== Early life and education ==
Charles Crownhart was born on his family's farm in Ashford, Wisconsin, in southeastern Fond du Lac County. Shortly after his birth, his father enlisted in the Union Army and went off to fight in the American Civil War. Upon his return, in 1866, the family relocated to a new farm in Pierce County, Wisconsin, in the far western part of the state, where Charles received most of his education. He attended River Falls Normal School then taught school for several years before entering the University of Wisconsin Law School, where he graduated in 1889.

== Legal and political career ==
After obtaining his law degree, Crownhart returned to Pierce County and briefly practiced law in Ellsworth, Wisconsin. In 1891, he moved to Superior, Wisconsin, to partner with Walter C. Owen in a new law firm there. The partnership later expanded to include William R. Foley. In 1900, Crownhart was elected to his first political office, serving as district attorney of Douglas County, Wisconsin.

In February 1906, Crownhart was appointed to the board of regents of the state normal schools, by governor James O. Davidson. He traveled the state considerably as a member of the board of regents at a time when the board was authorizing an expanding number of normal school campuses and facilities.

In 1910, he was hired as campaign manager for Robert M. La Follette and moved to Madison, Wisconsin. In 1910, U.S. senators were still elected by the state legislature, and the Republican Party nearly always held the legislative majority in Wisconsin in this era. So the campaign was largely focused on ensuring that La Follette's allies won Republican legislative primaries to serve in the 50th Wisconsin Legislature. As campaign manager, Crownhart introduced a catch phrase that became part of the La Follette mythos for the rest of his career—that his campaign was about "men against money". That fall, La Follette's allies prevailed in the primary election and Crownhart was elected chairman of the Republican Party of Wisconsin central committee.

Five days before the September primary, Frank T. Tucker, progressive candidate for Attorney General of Wisconsin, died by suicide. Despite his death—or possibly because his death was not yet widely known—he won the Republican primary for Attorney General. With their nominee dead, the Republican state central committee voted to name Crownhart as their nominee for Attorney General. Litigation ensued, however, as Levi H. Bancroft, who was defeated by Tucker in the primary, sought to have his name placed on the ballot as the Republican nominee. The Wisconsin Supreme Court ruled in October that the votes for Tucker should not be counted, since he was already dead at the time of the election, and therefore Bancroft should be the nominee as the runner up in the primary. After the unfavorable ruling from the Wisconsin Supreme Court, Crownhart and his allies proceeded with an independent Republican bid for Attorney General, contending that the votes cast for the deceased candidate, Tucker, were intended as opposition to Bancroft. Crownhart ultimately came in a distant third place in the general election, with Bancroft narrowly defeating Democratic opponent John H. Doherty.

In 1911, the Wisconsin Legislature created the Wisconsin Industrial Commission to take over the work of the Bureau of Labor and Industrial Statistics. Governor Francis E. McGovern appointed Crownhart to serve as chairman of the new three-member commission, taking office in July 1911. Crownhart ultimately served four years in the role, until his term expired in 1915. Crownhart then played a key role in organizing La Follette's bid for the 1916 Republican Party presidential nomination.

In 1918, Crownhart ran for Wisconsin Supreme Court, challenging justice Marvin B. Rosenberry, who had been appointed to the court in 1916. Rosenberry easily prevailed, however, taking about 57% of the vote. The following year, Crownhart was appointed state revisor of statutes.

Wisconsin Supreme Court chief justice Robert G. Siebecker died in February 1922, creating a vacancy on the court. Within days, Crownhart was mentioned as a potential appointee. Governor John J. Blaine officially selected Crownhart for the position on April 4, 1922. Crownhart had to stand for election to a full term the following year, but he faced no opposition in the 1923 election.

Crownhart served on the court until his death in 1930. He was admitted to Wisconsin General Hospital in Madison on May 1, 1930, for what was then described as indigestion. He died the next day.

== Personal life and family ==
Charles Crownhart was one of at least five children born to Napoleon Crownhart and his wife Mahitable Ann "Mina" (née Burgess). Napoleon Crownhart served in the 35th Wisconsin Infantry Regiment during the American Civil War, and rose to the rank of sergeant before his discharge in 1866.

Charles Crownhart married Jessie Elizabeth Evans in July 1895. Mrs. Crownhart served on the board of regents of the state teachers colleges. They had two sons:

- Jesse George Crownhart was active in the state medical society, but died of a heart attack at age 45.
- Charles Henry Crownhart Jr. followed his father into the legal profession and also served as an officer in the state medical society.

At his funeral, pallbearers included both of Wisconsin's incumbent U.S. senators—John J. Blaine and Robert M. La Follette Jr.—along with Philip La Follette and prominent attorney Fred M. Wylie.

== Electoral history ==
=== Wisconsin Supreme Court (1918) ===
1918 Wisconsin Supreme Court special election
Party	Candidate	Votes	%	±%
General Election (April 2, 1918)
Nonpartisan	Marvin B. Rosenberry (incumbent)	212,727	57.18%	
Nonpartisan	Charles H. Crownhart	159,190	42.79%	
Plurality		53,537	14.39%	
Total votes		372,046	100.0%	

Party political offices
Preceded by Edward A. Edmonds	Chairman of the Republican Party of Wisconsin; August 1910 – July 1911	Succeeded by George E. Scott
Government offices
New office	Chairman of the Wisconsin Industrial Commission; July 1, 1911 – June 30, 1915	Succeeded by Joseph D. Beck
Legal offices
Preceded by Robert G. Siebecker	Justice of the Wisconsin Supreme Court; April 4, 1922 – May 2, 1930 (died)	Succeeded by John D. Wickhem
