= George B. Nelson =

American judge (1876–1943)

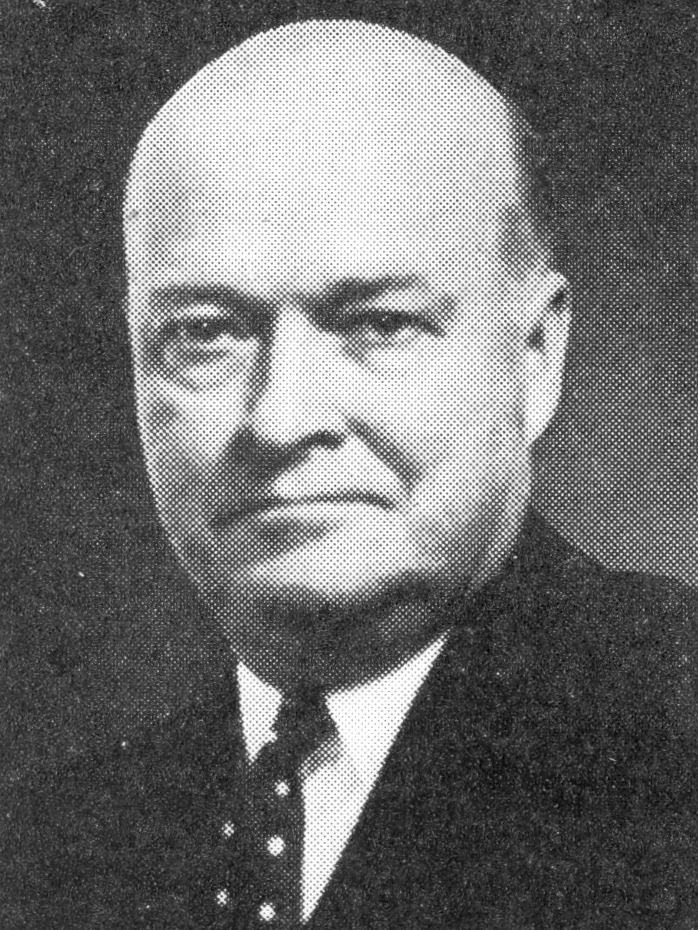
- Nelson circa 1940

Justice of the Wisconsin Supreme Court
- In office September 30, 1930 – December 11, 1942
- Appointed by: Walter J. Kohler Sr.
- Preceded by: E. Ray Stevens
- Succeeded by: Elmer E. Barlow

District Attorney of Portage County, Wisconsin
- In office January 1, 1907 – January 1, 1913
- Preceded by: G. M. Dahl
- Succeeded by: D. S. Sickelsteel

Personal details
- Born: May 21, 1876 Amherst, Wisconsin, U.S.
- Died: January 10, 1943 (aged 66) Madison, Wisconsin, U.S.
- Resting place: Forest Cemetery, Stevens Point, Wisconsin
- Party: Republican
- Spouse: Ruth Weller (m. 1912–1943)
- Children: Elizabeth Juniata Nelson^{(b. 1915; died 1918)}; George Bliss Nelson Jr.^{(b. 1921; died 1985)}
- Relatives: Reginald Heber Weller (father-in-law)
- Education: University of Wisconsin–Madison; George Washington University Law School
- Profession: Lawyer

George Bliss Nelson (May 21, 1876 – January 10, 1943) was an American lawyer from Portage County, Wisconsin. He was a justice of the Wisconsin Supreme Court from 1930 through 1942. He earlier served as district attorney of Portage County.

== Biography ==
Nelson was born George Bliss Nelson on May 21, 1876, in Amherst, Wisconsin. He attended the University of Wisconsin–Madison and George Washington University Law School and became a member of the Order of the Coif. After law school, he returned to Stevens Point, Wisconsin, where he was a partner for several years in the law firm Cate, Dahl, and Nelson.

== Public service ==
Nelson was District Attorney of Portage County, Wisconsin, from 1906 to 1913. Previously, he was City Attorney of Stevens Point, Wisconsin. Additionally, he was a delegate to the 1908 Republican National Convention. Nelson was appointed to the Supreme Court by Governor Walter J. Kohler Sr., in 1930. He was elected to a full term on the court in 1935, and served until 1942, when his health began to fail. He sent his formal resignation to the Governor in December 1942, and died a month later, on January 10, 1943.

== Personal life and family ==
Nelson was deeply religious and active in the Episcopal Church. He married Ruth Weller in 1912. Ruth was a daughter of the Episcopal bishop Reginald Heber Weller. George and Ruth Nelson had four children.

Legal offices
Preceded by G. M. Dahl	District Attorney of Portage County, Wisconsin; January 1, 1907 – January 1, 1913	Succeeded by D. S. Sickelsteel
Preceded by E. Ray Stevens	Justice of the Wisconsin Supreme Court; September 30, 1930 – December 11, 1942	Succeeded by Elmer E. Barlow
