= 1987 Wisconsin Supreme Court election =

- April 7, 1987
Candidate	William G. Callow
Popular vote	836,637
Percentage	unopposed
- County results Callow: >90%
Justice before election
William G. Callow
Elected Justice
William G. Callow

The 1987 Wisconsin Supreme Court election was held on April 7, 1987, to elect a justice to the Wisconsin Supreme Court for a ten-year term. Incumbent justice William G. Callow was re-elected unopposed.

== Results ==
1987 Wisconsin Supreme Court election
Party	Candidate	Votes	%	±%
General election (April 7, 1987)
Nonpartisan	William G. Callow (incumbent)	836,637	unopposed	
	Scattering			
Total votes				
