= 1953 Wisconsin Supreme Court election =

- April 7, 1953

Candidate	Timothy Brown	Perry J. Stearns
Popular vote	428,917	306,924
Percentage	58.29%	41.71%
Justice before election
Timothy Brown
Elected Justice
Timothy Brown

The 1953 Wisconsin Supreme Court election was held on Tuesday, April 7, 1953 to elect a justice to a full ten-year seat the Wisconsin Supreme Court. Incumbent justice Timothy Brown (appointed in 1949 to fill a vacancy) won election to a full ten-year term.

== Background ==
After a vacancy arose on the Supreme Court, Governor Oscar Rennebohm appointed Timothy Brown to the court. Brown had served as executive legal counsel to the governor.

== Candidates ==
- Timothy Brown, incumbent justice
- Perry J. Stearns, attorney; corporate executive; unsuccessful candidate in the 1944 and 1946 Republican primaries for U.S. Senate

== Results ==
1953 Wisconsin Supreme Court election
Party	Candidate	Votes	%
General election (April 7, 1953)
Nonpartisan	Timothy Brown (incumbent)	428,917	58.29
Nonpartisan	Perry J. Stearns	306,924	41.71
Plurality			
Total votes		735,841	100
