= Peter Nelson (b. 1852) =

Peter Nelson (November 26, 1852 – October 22, 1928) was a member of the Wisconsin State Assembly.

Nelson was born on November 26, 1852, in Jutland, Denmark. He was a Republican. He was elected to the Assembly in 1892. That year, he was also elected as an alderman of Racine, Wisconsin. Previously, Nelson had been elected to the county board of supervisors of Racine County, Wisconsin in 1889.

He moved to Los Angeles in 1922 and died there on October 22, 1928. He was buried at Inglewood Park Cemetery.
