= 1899 Wisconsin Supreme Court elections =

1899 Wisconsin Supreme Court election
- April 4, 1899

The 1899 Wisconsin Supreme Court elections were held during Wisconsin's 1899 spring election and featured two elections: a regular election and a special election. In both elections, incumbents were re-elected without opposition.

== Regular election ==
1899 Wisconsin Supreme Court election
- April 4, 1899
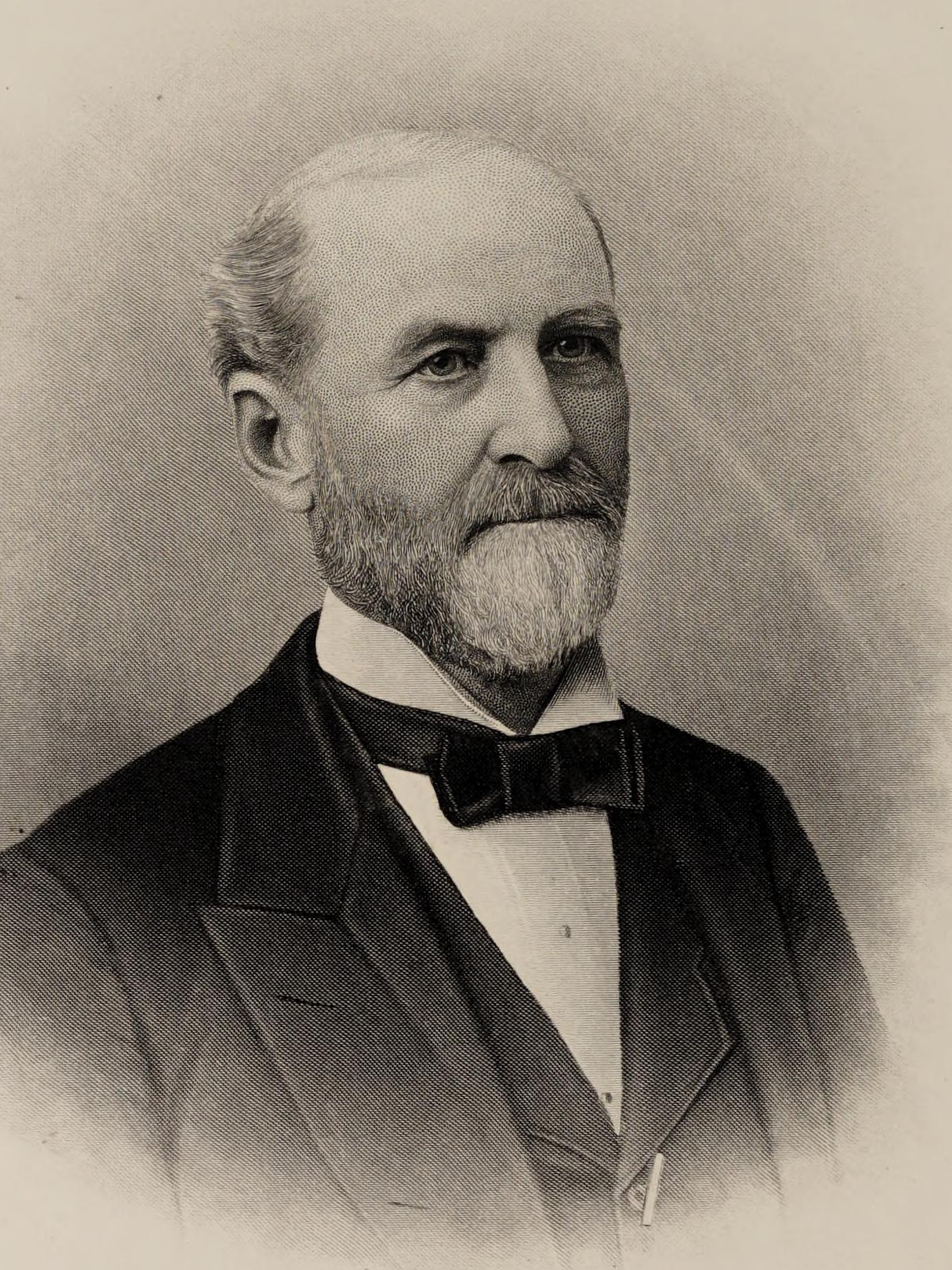
Candidate	John B. Cassoday
Popular vote	130,705
Percentage	99.47%
Justice before election
John B. Cassoday
Elected Justice
John B. Cassoday

The 1899 Wisconsin Supreme Court election was held to elect a justice to a full ten-year term. Incumbent justice John B. Cassoday was re-elected unopposed.

1889 Wisconsin Supreme Court election
Party	Candidate	Votes	%
General Election, April 4, 1899
Nonpartisan	John B. Cassoday (incumbent)	130,705	99.47
	Scattering	698	0.53
Total votes		131,402	100

== Special election ==
1899 Wisconsin Supreme Court special election
- April 4, 1899
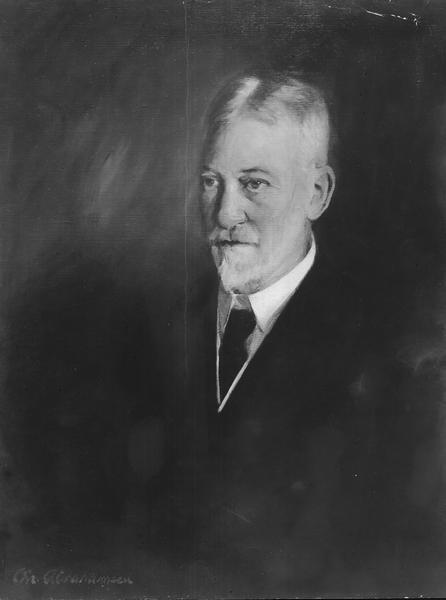
Candidate	Joshua Eric Dodge
Popular vote	103,372
Percentage	99.06%
Justice before election
Joshua Eric Dodge
Elected Justice
Joshua Eric Dodge

The 1899 Wisconsin Supreme Court special election was a special election that saw incumbent justice Joshua Eric Dodge (appointed to fill the seat left vacant by Silas U. Pinney) elected unopposed to complete Pinney's term.

1899 Wisconsin Supreme Court special election
Party	Candidate	Votes	%
General Election, April 4, 1899
Nonpartisan	Joshua Eric Dodge (incumbent)	103,372	99.06
	Scattering	982	0.94
Total votes		104,354	100
