= 1887 Wisconsin Supreme Court election =

- April 5, 1887
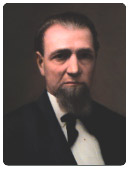
Candidate	Harlow S. Orton
Popular vote	127,944
Percentage	99.72%
Justice before election
Harlow S. Orton
Elected Justice
Harlow S. Orton

The 1887 Wisconsin Supreme Court election was held on April 5, 1887. It saw the re-election of incumbent justice Harlow S. Orton, who ran unopposed.

== Candidate ==
- Harlow S. Orton, incumbent justice

== Result ==
1887 Wisconsin Supreme Court election
Party	Candidate	Votes	%	±%
Nonpartisan	Harlow S. Orton (incumbent)	127,944	99.72	
write-in	scattering	364	0.28	
Total votes		128,308	100	
