= 1955 Wisconsin Supreme Court election =

- April 5, 1955

Candidate	Grover L. Broadfoot
Popular vote	520,544
Percentage	100%
Justice before election
Grover L. Broadfoot
Elected Justice
Grover L. Broadfoot

The 1955 Wisconsin Supreme Court election was held on April 5, 1955. It saw incumbent justice Grover L. Broadfoot re-elected without opposition.

== Results ==
1955 Wisconsin Supreme Court election
Party	Candidate	Votes	%
General election (April 5, 1955)
Nonpartisan	Grover L. Broadfoot	520,544	100
