= Elmer E. Barlow =

American judge (1887–1948)

- portrait photograph, circa 1945

Justice of the Wisconsin Supreme Court
- In office December 12, 1942 – June 26, 1948 (died)
- Appointed by: Julius P. Heil
- Preceded by: George B. Nelson
- Succeeded by: Grover L. Broadfoot

1st Commissioner of Taxation of Wisconsin
- In office October 4, 1939 – December 12, 1942
- Appointed by: Julius P. Heil
- Preceded by: Position established
- Succeeded by: Arthur E. Wegner

District Attorney of Trempealeau County, Wisconsin
- In office January 1, 1915 – January 1, 1929
- Preceded by: Earl F. Hensel
- Succeeded by: John A. Markham

Personal details
- Born: May 18, 1887 Arcadia, Wisconsin, U.S.
- Died: June 26, 1948 (aged 61) Baileys Harbor, Wisconsin, U.S.
- Resting place: Arcadia Cemetery, Arcadia, Wisconsin
- Party: Republican
- Spouses: Kate Haralda Clausen (m. 1913; died 1930); Antonette M. Wohlgenant (m. 1937–1948)
- Children: Harald R. Barlow^{(b. 1914; died 1915)}; Elizabeth Charlotte (Daft)^{(b. 1916; died 1992)}; Robert Clausen Barlow^{(b. 1921; died 2006)}
- Education: University of Wisconsin (LL.B.)
- Profession: Lawyer

Elmer Elbert Barlow (May 18, 1887 – June 26, 1948) was an American lawyer and jurist from Trempealeau County, Wisconsin. He served as a justice of the Wisconsin Supreme Court for the last six years of his life. He was appointed to the Court by Governor Julius P. Heil after Heil's November 1942 election defeat, but Barlow went on to win a full term as justice in 1945. Prior to his elevation to the court, Barlow had served three years as the first (Note: He was the first to hold the new singular leadership role of "commissioner"; before 1939 the department was run by a "commission" of 3 members who had also sometimes been referred to as "commissioners".) state Tax commissioner (1939–1942), where he had also been appointed by Heil, and before that served as executive counsel to Heil on his gubernatorial staff. Earlier in his career, he served as district attorney of Trempealeau County.

== Early life ==
Elmer Barlow was born on his family's small farm in the town of Arcadia, in Trempealeau County, Wisconsin. He was raised and educated there, and went on to attend the University of Wisconsin. While in college, he was catcher for the University baseball team. He toured Japan with the baseball team in 1909, and graduated from the law department that year. After graduation, he turned down offers to play professional baseball, deciding instead to open a legal practice back in Arcadia. He was admitted to the bar in June 1909.

== Career ==
In 1914, Barlow was elected district attorney of Trempealeau County running on the Republican Party ticket. He was re-elected six times and ultimately served 14 years in that office.

In 1928, he sought the Republican nomination for Wisconsin Senate in the 32nd Senate district, launching a primary challenge against incumbent Valentine S. Keppel of La Crosse County. Barlow was identified as the more conservative or stalwart candidate, as opposed to Keppel, who leaned toward the progressive faction. Keppel prevailed in the primary election by a wide margin, receiving about 60% of the vote.

Barlow remained highly active in local political affairs as a leader of Trempealeau County Republicans.

In 1939, Barlow moved to Madison, Wisconsin, when he was hired as executive counsel to the newly-elected governor, Julius P. Heil. His job was nominally to provide legal and policy advice to the governor, but he also made public relations appearances on behalf of the governor. One of Heil's legislative priorities was an overhaul of the state's tax commission. In the summer of 1939, Heil signed legislation abolishing the old tax commission and creating a new department of taxation under the leadership of a single commissioner. Heil initially nominated Stephen J. McMahon, but he was compelled to withdraw McMahon's nomination after the revelation of significant unpaid court judgements against him. A short time later, Heil named Barlow as his nominee for tax commissioner. Barlow's nomination was swiftly confirmed by the state Senate, and he became the first holder of the new office.

Barlow continued in that role for the remainder of Heil's gubernatorial administration. Heil lost re-election in 1942, to Progressive candidate Orland Steen Loomis. Shortly after the election, incumbent Wisconsin Supreme Court justice George B. Nelson wrote to the governor and resigned his seat; Nelson had been in poor health for more than a year, and had largely been absent from the court through 1941 and 1942. The timely resignation allowed Heil to make a final appointment, and he named Barlow to replace Nelson on the state Supreme Court.

Barlow ran for election to a full term on the court in 1945, defeating incumbent secretary of state Fred R. Zimmerman and Milwaukee attorney Peter F. Leuch in the April general election.

Barlow never completed that term, however. He suffered an apparent heart attack and died just three years later, collapsing during a round of golf at Maxwelton Braes Golf Course in Door County, Wisconsin, on June 26, 1948.

== Electoral history ==
=== Wisconsin Supreme Court (1945) ===
Wisconsin Supreme Court election, 1945
Party	Candidate	Votes	%
Nonpartisan	Elmer E. Barlow (incumbent)	220,145	57.75%
Nonpartisan	Fred R. Zimmerman	138,756	36.40%
Nonpartisan	Peter F. Leuch	22,271	5.84%
	Scattering	20	0.01%
Plurality		81,389	21.35%
Total votes		381,192	100.00%

== Notes ==
Political offices
Position established	Commissioner of Taxation of Wisconsin; October 4, 1939 – December 12, 1942	Succeeded by Arthur E. Wegner
Legal offices
Preceded by Earl F. Hensel	District Attorney of Trempealeau County, Wisconsin; January 1, 1915 – January 1, 1929	Succeeded by John A. Markham
Preceded by George B. Nelson	Justice of the Wisconsin Supreme Court; December 12, 1942 – June 26, 1948 (died)	Succeeded by Grover L. Broadfoot
