= Francis Reuschlein =

American politician

Francis Reuschlein (February 8, 1834 – April 24, 1913) was an American businessman and politician.

He was born in the Grand Duchy of Baden. Reuschlein emigrated to the United States in 1852 and settled in Burlington, Wisconsin. Reuschlein was in the mercantile and insurance businesses. Reuschlein served as postmaster of Burlington from 1887 to 1891 and was a Democrat. He also served as Burlington town clerk, Racine County, Wisconsin court commissioner, justice of the peace, and oil inspector. Reuschlein also served on the board of education. In 1893, Reuschlein served in the Wisconsin State Assembly. Reuschlein died at his home in Burlington, Wisconsin.
