= 1921 Wisconsin Supreme Court election =

- April 5, 1921
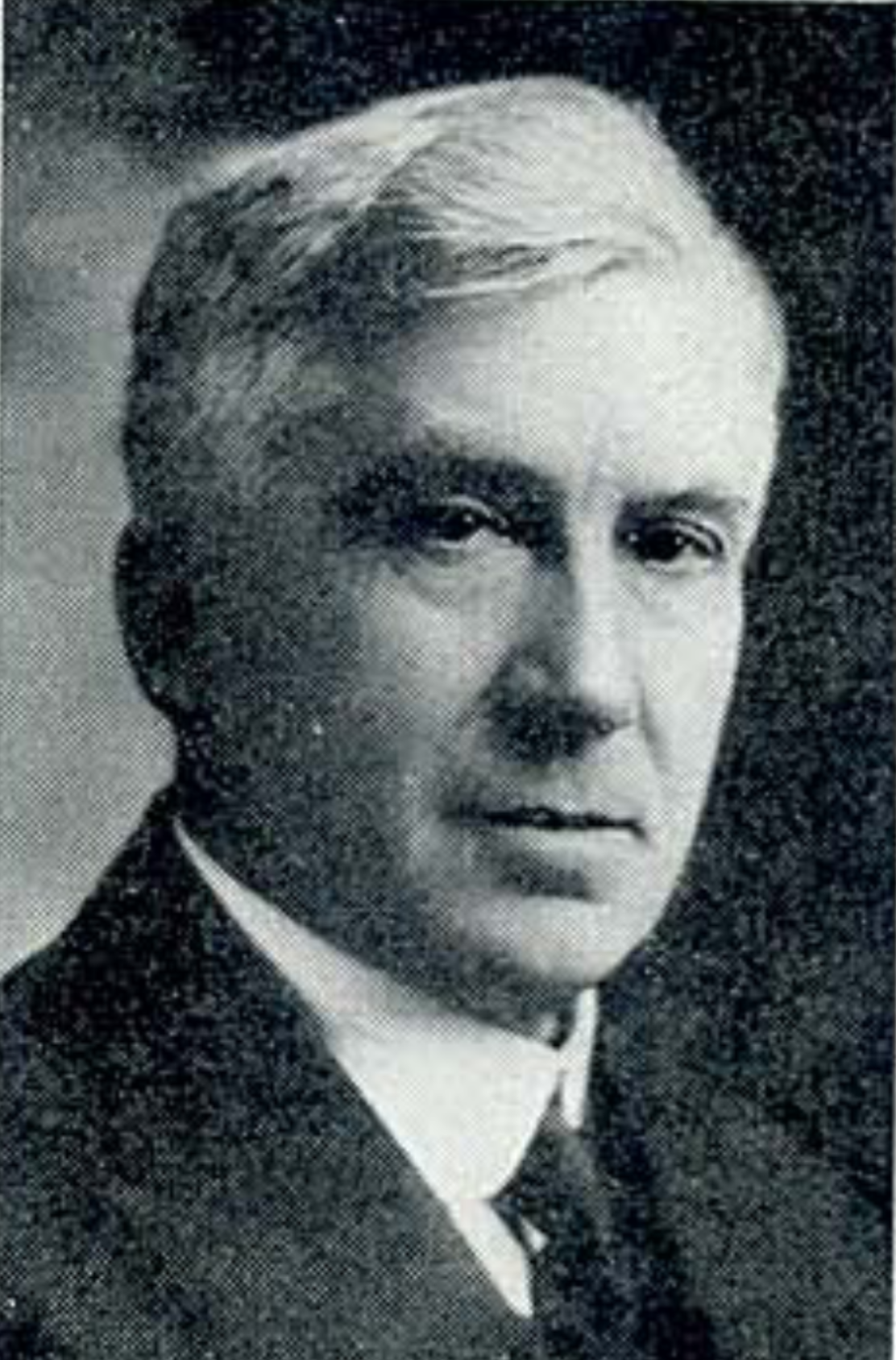
Candidate	Aad J. Vinje
Popular vote	309,022
Percentage	unopposed
Justice before election
Aad J. Vinje
Elected Justice
Aad J. Vinje

The 1921 Wisconsin Supreme Court election was held on Tuesday, April 5, 1921, to elect a justice to the Wisconsin Supreme Court for a ten-year term. Incumbent justice Aad J. Vinje was re-elected without opposition.

1921 Wisconsin Supreme Court election
Party	Candidate	Votes	%
General Election, April 5, 1921
Nonpartisan	Aad J. Vinje (incumbent)	300,022	Unopposed
