= Aad J. Vinje =

Chief Justice of the Wisconsin Supreme Court from 1922 to 1929

The Honorable Aad J. Vinje
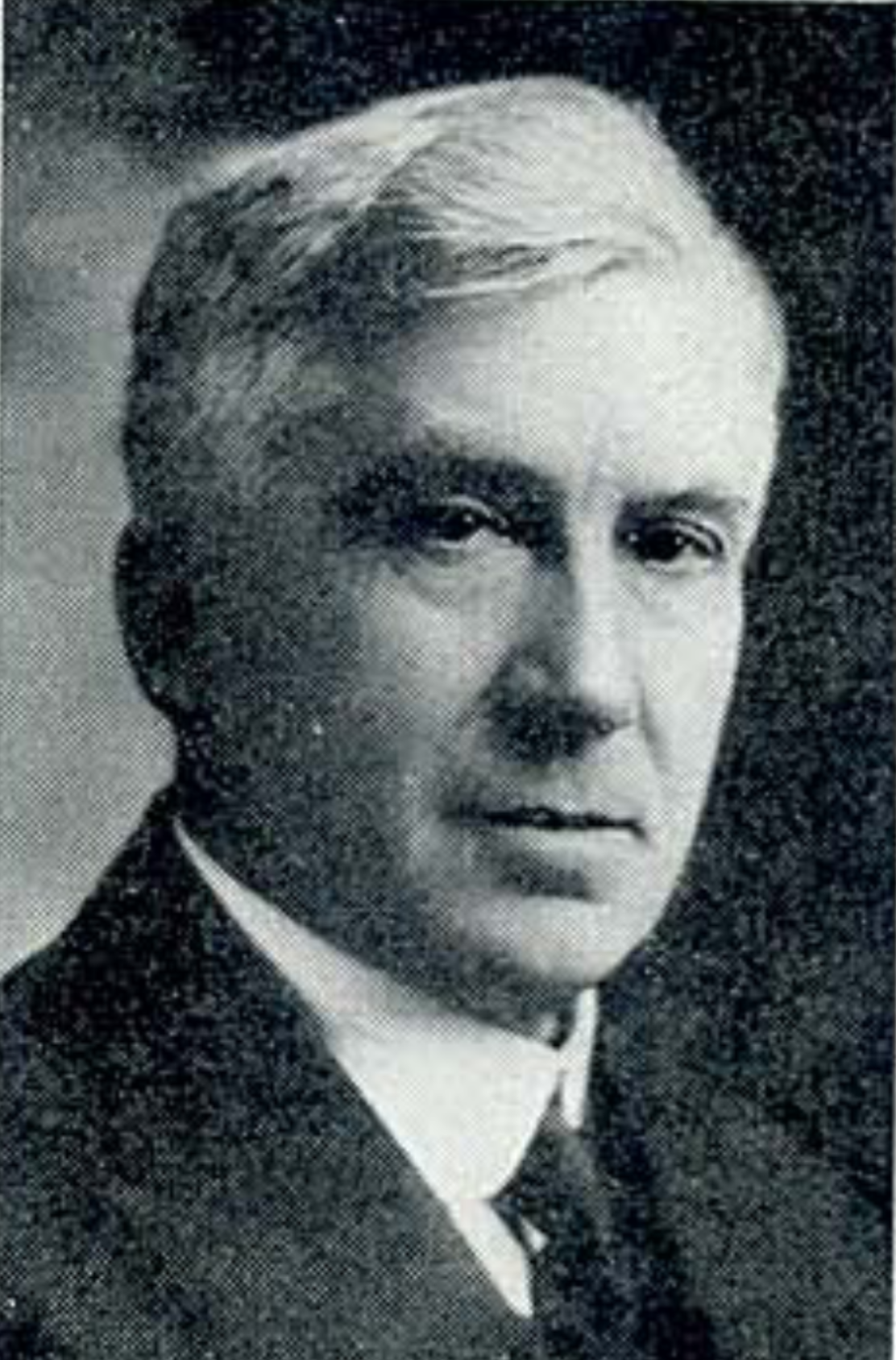

12th Chief Justice of the Wisconsin Supreme Court
- In office February 12, 1922 – March 23, 1929
- Preceded by: Robert G. Siebecker
- Succeeded by: Marvin B. Rosenberry

Justice of the Wisconsin Supreme Court
- In office September 10, 1910 – March 23, 1929
- Appointed by: James O. Davidson
- Preceded by: Joshua Eric Dodge
- Succeeded by: Chester A. Fowler

Wisconsin Circuit Court Judge for the 11th Circuit
- In office August 10, 1895 – September 10, 1910
- Appointed by: William H. Upham
- Preceded by: Roujet D. Marshall
- Succeeded by: Frank A. Ross

Personal details
- Born: Aad John Vinje; November 10, 1857 Voss, Hordaland, Norway
- Died: March 23, 1929 (aged 71) Madison, Wisconsin, U.S.
- Resting place: Forest Hill Cemetery, Madison
- Spouse: Alice Idell Miller (m. 1886–1929)
- Children: Arthur; David; Janet; Ethel
- Parent: Ingeborg Davidsdatter (Klove) Vinje (mother)
- Education: University of Wisconsin
- Profession: Lawyer, judge

Aad John Vinje (November 10, 1857 – March 23, 1929) was a Norwegian American immigrant, lawyer, and jurist. He was the 12th chief justice of the Wisconsin Supreme Court, serving from 1922 until his death in 1929. He previously served 15 years as a Wisconsin circuit court judge in the northwest of the state.

== Background ==
Aad John Vinje was born on the Vinje farm (Winje nedre) in Vangen parish in Voss Municipality, Hordaland county, Norway. His father died from injuries received in an accident in 1859 and his mother subsequently remarried. The family came to the United States in 1869 when Vinje was 12 years old. His parents, Mons Knudsen Vinje (1831-1923) and Ingeborg Davidsdatter (Klove) Vinje (1824–1901), immigrated together with their five children. His family settled in Marshall County, Iowa, where Vinje attended Iowa College (now Grinnell College) at Grinnell, Iowa from 1873 to 1874 and Northwestern University at Des Moines, Iowa from 1874 to 1875.

== Career ==
Vinje earned his law degree from the University of Wisconsin Law School (B.A., 1884; LL.B., 1887). While in school, he worked in the State Law Library. Vinje served as assistant Supreme Court reporter until 1891, when he established a law office in Superior, Wisconsin. In 1895, Vinje was appointed judge for the 11th Wisconsin Judicial Circuit where he served until 1910. He won election to 10-year terms on the Supreme Court in 1911 and 1921 . Upon the death of Chief Justice Robert G. Siebecker in February 1922, Vinje became the Chief Justice, a position he occupied until his death in 1929.

== Selected works ==
- "The Legal Aspect of Industrial Consolidations" (February 16, 1904), in Reports of the Proceedings of the Meetings of the State Bar Ass'n of Wisconsin, 1904–05, at 167, 171 (1906).

== Personal life ==
Vinje was married in 1886 to Alice Idell Miller (1863-1954). They were the parents of four children. Aad J. Vinje died during 1929 and was buried at the Forest Hill Cemetery in Dane County, Wisconsin.

Legal offices
Preceded by Roujet D. Marshall	Wisconsin Circuit Court Judge for the 11th Circuit; August 10, 1895 – September 10, 1910	Succeeded by Frank A. Ross
Preceded by Joshua Eric Dodge	Justice of the Wisconsin Supreme Court; September 10, 1910 – March 23, 1929	Succeeded by Chester A. Fowler
Preceded by Robert G. Siebecker	Chief Justice of the Wisconsin Supreme Court; February 12, 1922 – March 23, 1929	Succeeded by Marvin B. Rosenberry
