= 1970 Wisconsin Supreme Court election =

- April 7, 1970
Candidate	Connor Hansen
Popular vote	524,628
Percentage	100%
- County results Hansen: >90%
Justice before election
Connor Hansen
Elected Justice
Connor Hansen

The 1970 Wisconsin Supreme Court election was held on April 7, 1970, to elect a justice to the Wisconsin Supreme Court for a ten-year term. Incumbent justice Connor Hansen (who had been appointed in 1967 to fill a vacancy) won election, unopposed.

== Background ==
After Justice Myron L. Gordon stepped down from the state supreme court in order to accept a federal judgeship, governor Warren P. Knowles appointed Hansen (a circuit court judge) to fill the vacancy. Hansen was confirmed to the seat.. Prior to his elevation to the Supreme Court, Hansen had served for ten years as a county judge in Eau Claire County. His appointment received broad praise from state lawyers and lower court judges, particularly because it added a justice with prior probate court experience.

The Constitution of Wisconsin stipulates that early elections full terms can be triggered by a vacancy. The constitution stipulates that it is impermissible for more than one seat to be up for election in the same year. Elections must be moved to an earlier year after a vacancy, but only if there is a more immediate year without a scheduled contest. All supreme court elections are held during the spring elections in early April. The last election to the seat had taken place in 1961, and if the vacancy had not occurred no election would have been held for the seat until 1971. However, the vacancy advanced the next election by a year. Since there were was no supreme court election scheduled in 1970, but there were elections scheduled in 1968 and 1969, the vacancy moved the election to the next possible date, 1971. This allowed Hansen to serve as justice for three years before he was up for election.

The uncontested election came of several recent contested State Supreme Court races in preceding years, including upset victories (most notably the 1967 unseating of an incumbent). Due to this, Hansen had prepared himself for a competitive re-election race up until the ballot qualifying deadline passed without a challenger arising. Ahead of the deadline, he had had friends of his organize a voluntary campaign committee, and had conducted a months-long period of frequent speaking appearances.

== Result ==
1970 Wisconsin Supreme Court election
Party	Candidate	Votes	%
General election (April 7, 1970)
Nonpartisan	Connor Hansen (incumbent)	524,628	100
Total votes		524,628	100
