= 1911 Wisconsin Supreme Court election =

- April 4, 1911
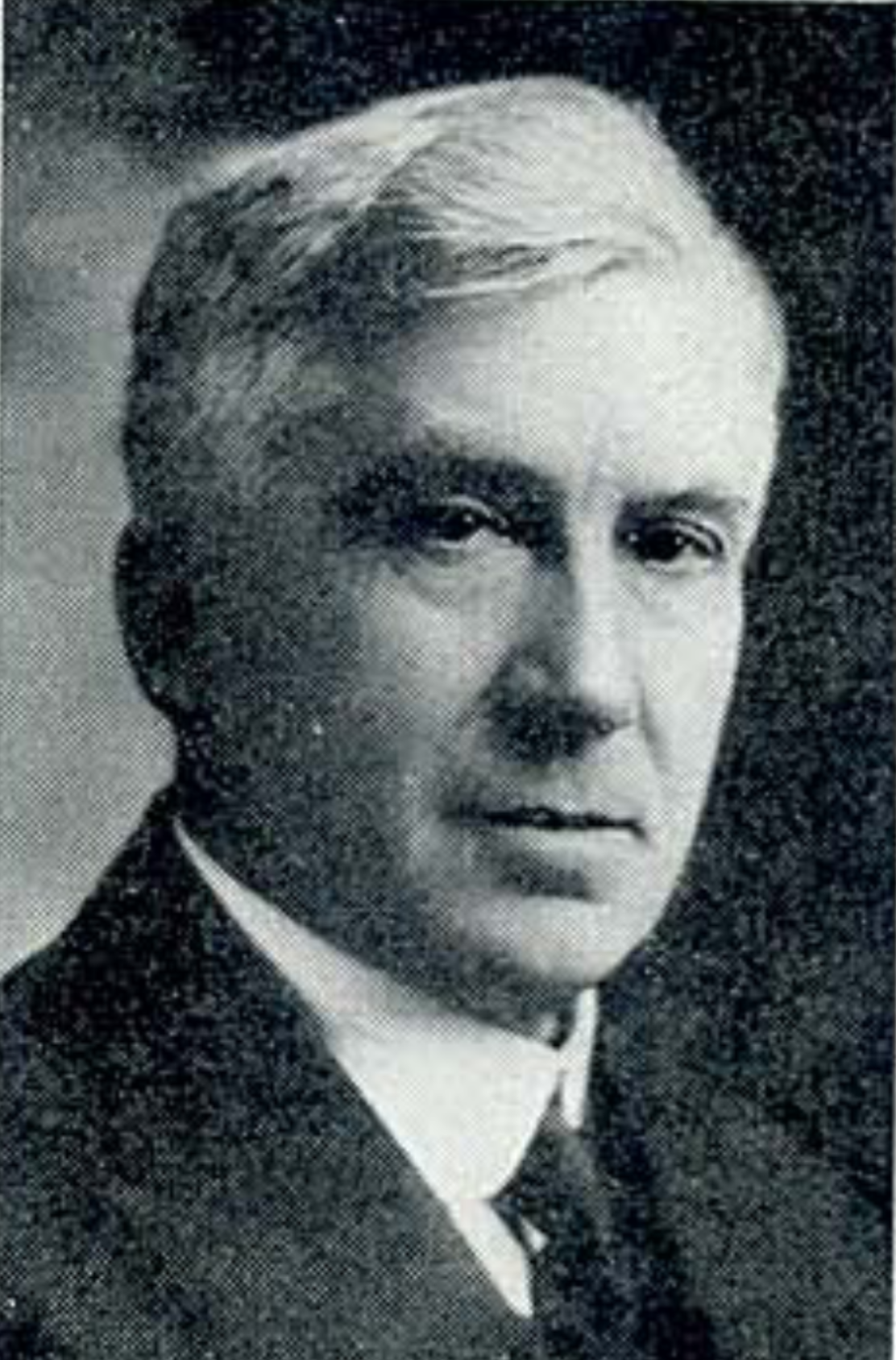
Candidate	Aad J. Vinje
Popular vote	159,281
Percentage	99.35%
Justice before election
Aad J. Vinje
Elected Justice
Aad J. Vinje

The 1911 Wisconsin Supreme Court election was held on Tuesday, April 4, 1911, to elect a justice to the Wisconsin Supreme Court for a ten-year term. Incumbent justice Aad J. Vinje (who had been appointed the previous year) was elected without opposition.

1911 Wisconsin Supreme Court election
Party	Candidate	Votes	%
General Election, April 4, 1911
Nonpartisan	Aad J. Vinje (incumbent)	159,281	99.35
	Scattering	1,047	0.65
Total votes		160,328	100
