= 1943 Wisconsin Supreme Court election =

- April 6, 1943
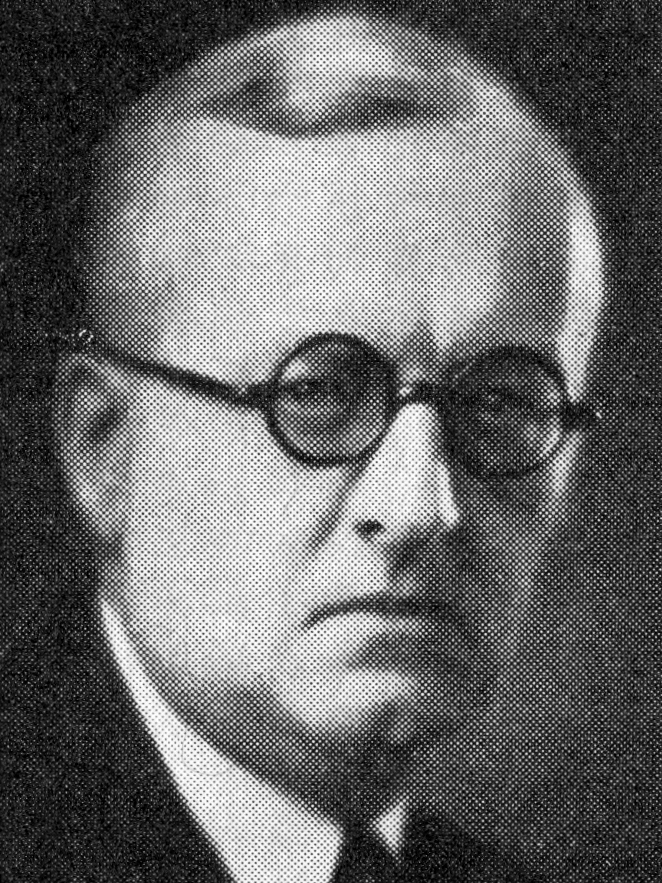

Candidate	John D. Wickhem
Popular vote	314,490
Percentage	100%
Justice before election
John D. Wickhem
Elected Justice
John D. Wickhem

The 1943 Wisconsin Supreme Court election was held on April 6, 1943. It saw incumbent justice John D. Wickhem re-elected without opposition.

== Results ==
1943 Wisconsin Supreme Court election
Party	Candidate	Votes	%
General election (April 6, 1943)
Nonpartisan	John D. Wickhem (incumbent)	314,490	100
