= John D. Wickhem =

20th century American judge

John D. Wickham
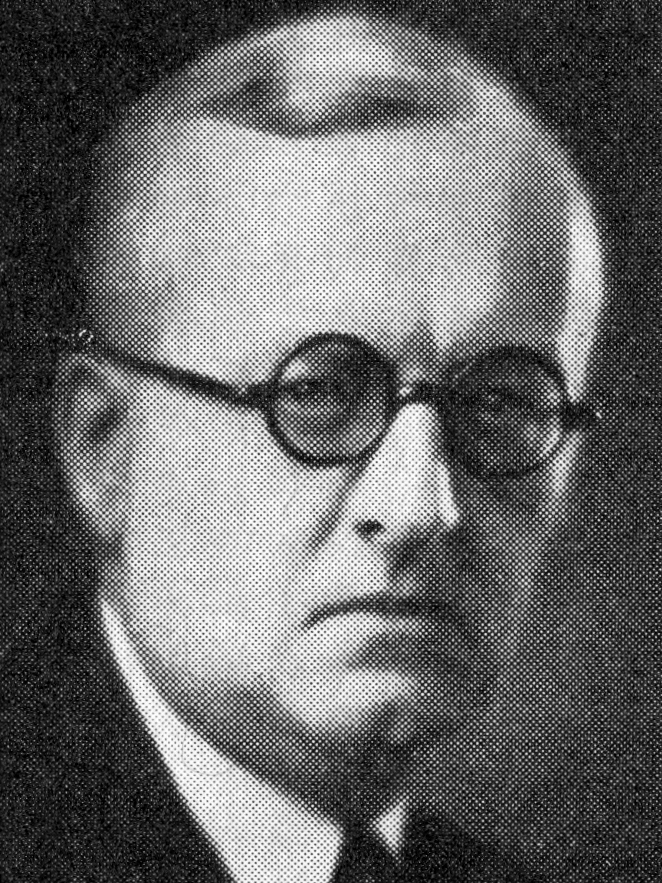
- ca. 1940

Justice of the Wisconsin Supreme Court
- In office September 25, 1930 – June 18, 1949 (died)
- Appointed by: Walter J. Kohler Sr.
- Preceded by: Charles H. Crownhart
- Succeeded by: Timothy Brown

Personal details
- Born: May 25, 1888 Beloit, Wisconsin, U.S.
- Died: June 19, 1949 (aged 61) Madison, Wisconsin, U.S.
- Resting place: Calvary Cemetery, Beloit
- Spouse: Mary Luella Carroll
- Children: 1
- Education: Beloit College; University of Wisconsin Law School
- Profession: Lawyer

John Dunne Wickhem (May 25, 1888 – June 19, 1949) was an American lawyer and jurist from Beloit, Wisconsin. He was a justice of the Wisconsin Supreme Court from 1930 until his death in 1949. Prior to joining the court, he worked as a professor at the University of Wisconsin Law School.

== Biography ==
John D. Wickhem was born in Beloit, Wisconsin, in May 1888. He was raised and educated in Beloit, and went on to earn his bachelor's degree from Beloit College in 1910. After graduating, he taught school in Beloit for four years until entering the University of Wisconsin Law School. He graduated after just two years, speeding up his progression with summer courses. After law school, he went to work in the law office of Burr W. Jones until 1917, when he moved to Milwaukee.

But he soon left for Washington, D.C., where he worked for the War Trade Intelligence Bureau through the end of World War I. Returning to Wisconsin in 1919, he was hired as an assistant professor at the University of Wisconsin Law School. He was subsequently promoted to full professor in 1925.

In 1930, he was appointed to the Wisconsin Supreme Court by Governor Walter J. Kohler Sr., to fill the vacancy caused by the death of Charles H. Crownhart. Although Kohler was a Republican, Wickhem at the time was described as a Democrat. He was subsequently elected to a full ten-year term in 1933 and was re-elected in 1943.

His most historically noteworthy opinion on the court was likely State ex rel Martin v. Heil, in which he wrote for a unanimous court that the lieutenant governor-elect would become the next governor following the death of the governor-elect.

On June 18, 1949, he complained of a slight illness after returning from a trip to Evanston, Illinois, and was taken to a hospital in Madison. He died the next day.

Legal offices
Preceded by Charles H. Crownhart	Justice of the Wisconsin Supreme Court; September 25, 1930 – June 18, 1949 (died)	Succeeded by Timothy Brown
