= 1889 Wisconsin Supreme Court election =

- April 2, 1889
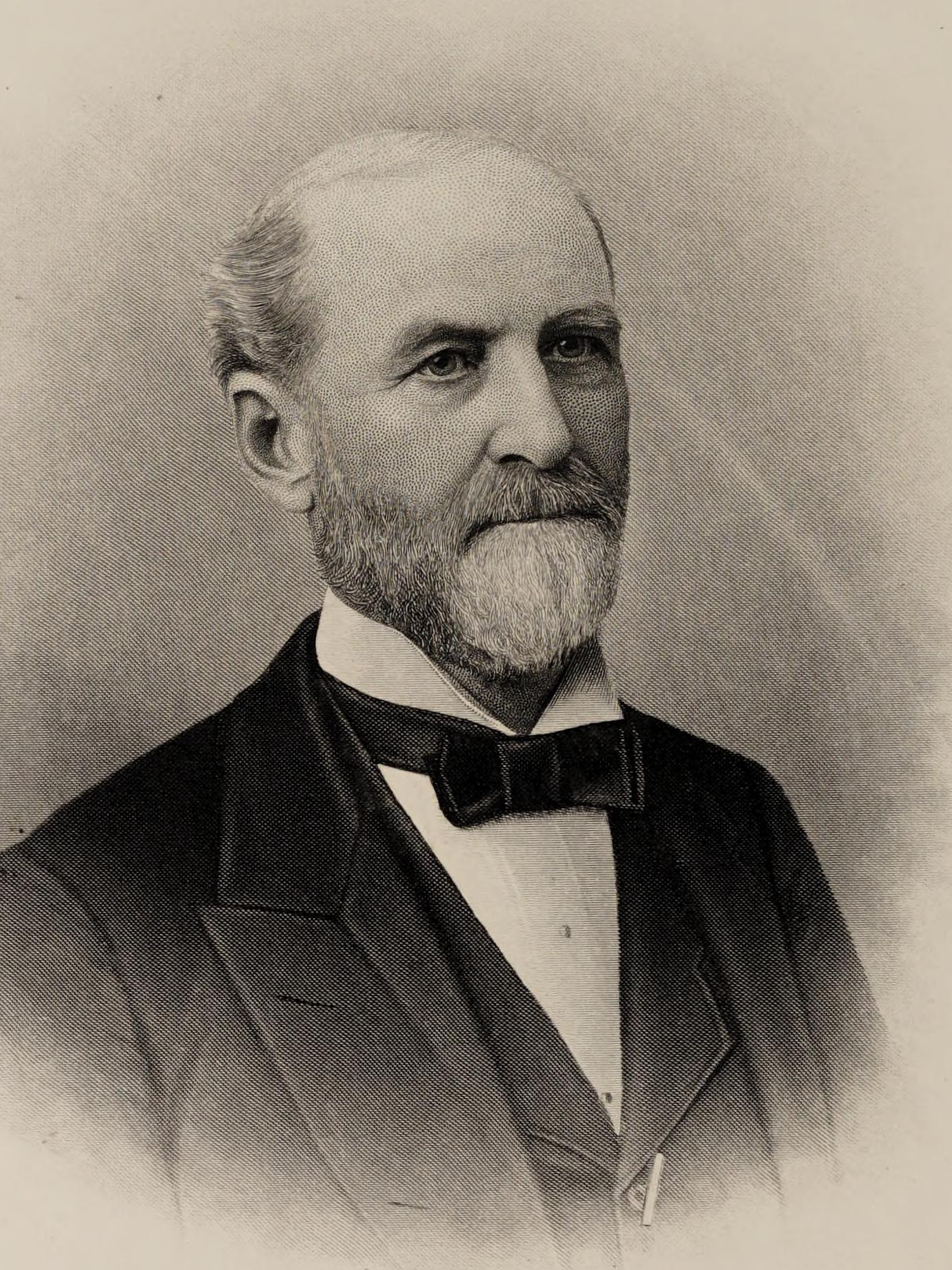
Candidate	John B. Cassoday
Popular vote	210899
Percentage	99.93%
Justice before election
John B. Cassoday
Elected Justice
John B. Cassoday

The 1889 Wisconsin Supreme Court election was held on April 2, 1889. It saw the re-election of incumbent justice John B. Cassoday, who ran unopposed.

== Candidate ==
- John B. Cassoday, incumbent justice

== Result ==
1889 Wisconsin Supreme Court election
Party	Candidate	Votes	%	±%
Nonpartisan	John B. Cassoday (incumbent)	210,899	99.93	
write-in	scattering	153	0.07	
Total votes		211052	100	
