= 1994 Wisconsin Supreme Court election =

- April 5, 1994
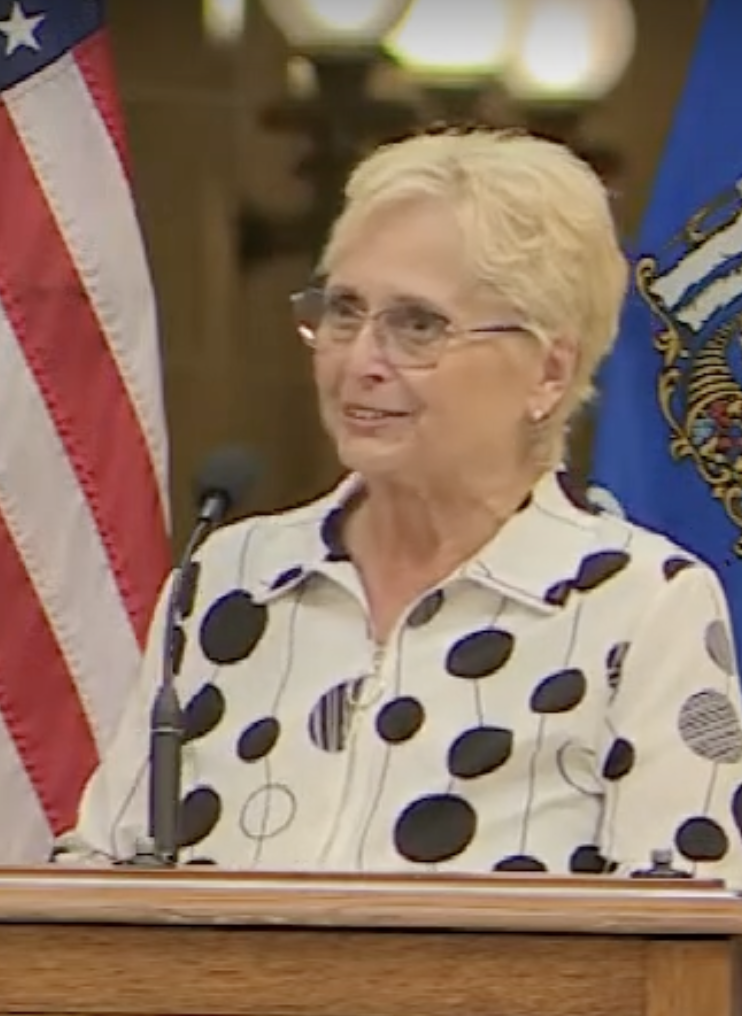

Candidate	Janine P. Geske	William A. Pangman
Popular vote	424,549	125,271
Percentage	77.22%	22.78%
- Geske: 50–60% 60–70% 70–80% 80–90%
Justice before election
Janine P. Geske
Elected Justice
Janine P. Geske

The 1994 Wisconsin Supreme Court election was held on April 5, 1994, to elect a justice to the Wisconsin Supreme Court for a ten-year term. Incumbent justice Janine P. Geske (who had been appointed the previous year to fill a vacancy on the seat) was re-elected over challenger William A. Pangman.

== Result ==
Gieske's victory was the largest margin in a contested Wisconsin Supreme Court election in decades. As of 2026, it remains the last time a candidate received more than 70% of the vote in a contested election to the court.

1994 Wisconsin Supreme Court election
Party	Candidate	Votes	%	±%
General election (April 5, 1994)
Nonpartisan	Janine P. Geske (incumbent)	424,549	77.22	
Nonpartisan	William A. Pangman	125,271	22.78	
Majority		299,278	54.43	
Total votes		549,820	100	
