= 1901 Wisconsin Supreme Court election =

- April 2, 1901
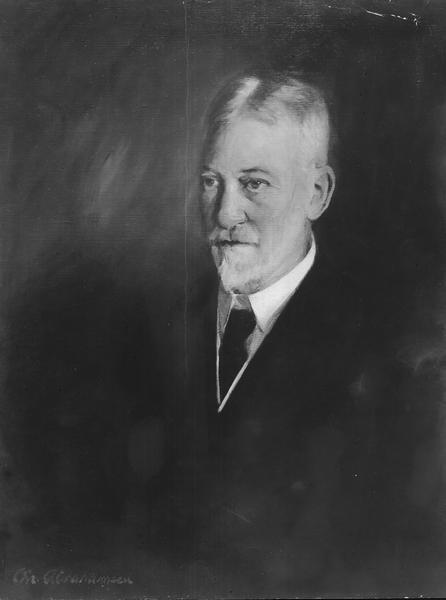
Candidate	Joshua Eric Dodge
Popular vote	130,161
Percentage	99.06%
Justice before election
Joshua Eric Dodge
Elected Justice
Joshua Eric Dodge

The 1901 Wisconsin Supreme Court election was held on Tuesday, April 2, 1901, to elect a justice to the Wisconsin Supreme Court for a ten-year term. Incumbent justice Joshua Eric Dodge was re-elected without opposition.

1901 Wisconsin Supreme Court election
Party	Candidate	Votes	%
General Election, April 2, 1901
Nonpartisan	Joshua Eric Dodge (incumbent)	130,161	99.06
	Scattering	3,651	2.73
Total votes		133,812	100.
