= Timothy Brown (judge) =

American judge, 18th Chief Justice of the Wisconsin Supreme Court

The Honorable Timothy Brown
- Brown, as a justice in the 1960s

18th Chief Justice of the Wisconsin Supreme Court
- In office May 18, 1962 – January 1, 1964
- Preceded by: Grover L. Broadfoot
- Succeeded by: George R. Currie

Justice of the Wisconsin Supreme Court
- In office July 14, 1949 – January 1, 1964
- Appointed by: Oscar Rennebohm
- Preceded by: John D. Wickhem
- Succeeded by: Bruce F. Beilfuss

Personal details
- Born: February 24, 1889 Madison, Wisconsin, U.S.
- Died: December 31, 1977 (aged 88) Madison, Wisconsin, U.S.
- Resting place: Forest Hill Cemetery; Madison, Wisconsin
- Party: Republican
- Spouses: Margaret Seymour Titchener (m. 1921; died 1936); Louise Coxon (m. 1936; died 1977)
- Children: Timothy Brown Jr.; (b. 1922; died 1977)
- Education: University of Wisconsin; Harvard Law School
- Profession: Lawyer

Military service
- Allegiance: United States
- Branch/service: United States Navy
- Battles/wars: World War I

Timothy Brown Sr. (February 24, 1889 – December 31, 1977) was an American lawyer and jurist from Madison, Wisconsin. He was the 18th chief justice of the Wisconsin Supreme Court (1962–1963), and served a total of 14 years on the court. Before joining the court, he was executive legal counsel to governors Walter S. Goodland and Oscar Rennebohm, the latter appointed him to the Supreme Court.

== Early life and education ==
Brown was born in Madison, Wisconsin. He graduated from the University of Wisconsin–Madison in 1911 with a bachelor of arts degree. In 1914, he graduated Harvard Law School with a bachelor of laws degree.

== Legal career ==
After graduating law school Brown practiced as an attorney (including in Milwaukee, Wisconsin) from 1914 through 1949, with exception of his period of service in the United States Navy in 1917 and 1918 (amid World War I).

From 1926 to 1949, Brown served as a court commissioner in Dane County, Wisconsin. He served as executive counsel to the governor of Wisconsin, both under Governor Walter Goodland (from 1945 to 1947) and under Governor Oscar Rennebohm (from 1947 to 1949). In 1949, Brown additionally served on the Wisconsin Public Service Commission.

== Justice of the Wisconsin Supreme Court ==
In 1949, Brown was appointed by Governor Rennebohm to join the Wisconsin Supreme Court. In 1962, he became chief justice of the court, ultimately retiring in 1964.

He became chief justice of the Wisconsin Supreme Court by rule of seniority on May 18, 1962, after the death of Chief Justice Grover L. Broadfoot. At the time he became chief justice, he was already expected to step down at the end of 1963, when his current term expired. This was due to a 1955 amendment to the state constitution, which set 70 as a mandatory retirement age for state judges. (Note: To avoid confusion on this point, the mandatory retirement age implemented in 1955 was repealed by another amendment in 1977, which instead said the legislature could set a mandatory retirement age. The legislature has never implemented this, which is why there is no mandatory retirement age for Wisconsin judges since 1977.)

== Personal life and family ==
On June 29, 1921, Timothy Brown married Margaret Seymour Titchener, at her parents' home in Ithaca, New York. Margaret Titchener was the eldest daughter of psychologist Edward B. Titchener. They met at the University of Wisconsin, while she was working on the staff of the Romance language department, where she earned her Ph.D. They had one son together, Timothy Jr. Margaret suffered from a long illness in the 1930s and died at age 40 in February 1936.

Later that year, on July 16, Brown married Louise Coxon, daughter of a prominent Madison family. Louise was a dress designer, and had studied under Bradshaw Crandell.

Brown, his second wife, and his son all died in the last quarter of 1977. Brown's son, Timothy Jr., followed his mother in the study of Romance languages and taught Spanish and Portuguese at the University of Arizona for 25 years. During World War II, he served as a first lieutenant in the U.S. 3rd Infantry Division. He died in Arizona at age 55 after suffering from a respiratory disease.

Brown's wife, Louise, died on December 5, 1977, at age 71, after 41 years of marriage. At the time of her death, she was celebrated as a civic leader and patron of the arts in Madison. Timothy Brown died just a few weeks later, in a nursing home in Madison, on December 31, 1977. He left an estate valued at $3 million (about $15 million adjusted for inflation to 2024). He was survived by three granddaughters.

== Notes ==
Legal offices
Preceded by John D. Wickhem	Justice of the Wisconsin Supreme Court; 1949 – 1964	Succeeded by Bruce F. Beilfuss
Preceded by Grover L. Broadfoot	Chief Justice of the Wisconsin Supreme Court; 1962 – 1964	Succeeded by George R. Currie
