= William G. Callow =

American judge, former justice of the Wisconsin Supreme Court

The Honorable William G. Callow
- portrait photograph, as a justice

Justice of the Wisconsin Supreme Court
- In office August 1, 1977 – September 1, 1992
- Preceded by: Robert W. Hansen
- Succeeded by: Jon P. Wilcox

Wisconsin County Court Judge for Waukesha County, Branch 4
- In office August 1, 1961 – July 31, 1977
- Preceded by: Position Created
- Succeeded by: Patrick L. Snyder

Personal details
- Born: William Grant Callow; April 9, 1921 Waukesha, Wisconsin, U.S.
- Died: March 6, 2018 (aged 96) Oconomowoc, Wisconsin, U.S.
- Spouse: Jean Zilavy (m. 1950–2018)
- Children: Grant; Christine (Vasquez); Katie (Wilkie)
- Education: University of Wisconsin–Madison (Ph.B.); University of Wisconsin Law School (JD)

Military service
- Allegiance: United States
- Branch/service: United States Marine Corps; United States Air Force
- Years of service: 1943–1945 (Marine Corps); 1951–1952 (Air Force)
- Rank: 2nd Lieutenant
- Battles/wars: World War II; Korean War

William Grant Callow (April 9, 1921 – March 6, 2018) was an American jurist who served as a justice of the Wisconsin Supreme Court from 1977 to 1992.

== Life and career ==
portrait, circa 1977

Callow was born in Waukesha, Wisconsin and graduated from Waukesha High School. He received his bachelor's and law degrees from the University of Wisconsin Madison and is a veteran of both World War II and the Korean War, serving in the United States Marine Corps in the former and in the United States Air Force in the latter. Following his discharge from the Air Force, Callow served as Waukesha City Attorney from 1952 to 1960. From 1961 to 1977, Callow served as a judge of the Waukesha County Court, presiding over a felony trial calendar. As a county judge, Callow gained notoriety for innovations in restorative justice practices and for his general prohibition of plea bargaining. In 1977, Callow was elected to a seat on the Wisconsin Supreme Court vacated by Justice Robert W. Hansen, defeating Milwaukee County Circuit Court judge Robert Watson Landry. Callow is the only Wisconsin county judge elected directly to the Supreme Court; county courts, trial courts of limited jurisdiction, were merged with the circuit court system in 1978.

Callow's judicial philosophy on the Supreme Court was categorized as both moderate and conservative. He served on the court until 1992, when he retired, citing a desire to "take time to smell the roses." Following his retirement, Callow has served as a reserve circuit court judge, as an arbitrator for the Wisconsin Employee Relations Commission, and as a mediator. Callow died, on March 6, 2018, in Oconomowoc, Wisconsin at AngelsGrace Hospice.
