= Christian Doerfler =

American judge

Doerfler, in the 1920s

Christian Doerfler (March 2, 1862 in Milwaukee, Wisconsin – June 10, 1934) was a justice of the Wisconsin Supreme Court. He graduated from the University of Wisconsin Law School in 1885. Doerfler was married to Julia Anderson. They had one son.

== Public service and career ==
Doerfler was Commissioner of Milwaukee Public Schools before serving as Assistant District Attorney of Milwaukee County, Wisconsin from 1889 to 1891. He was a delegate to the Republican National Convention in 1912 and 1916. In 1921, he was appointed to the Supreme Court by Governor John J. Blaine. Doerfler remained a member until his resignation in 1929 after he began to suffer from poor health.
