= Marvin B. Rosenberry =

American judge, 13th Chief Justice of the Wisconsin Supreme Court

The Honorable Marvin B. Rosenberry
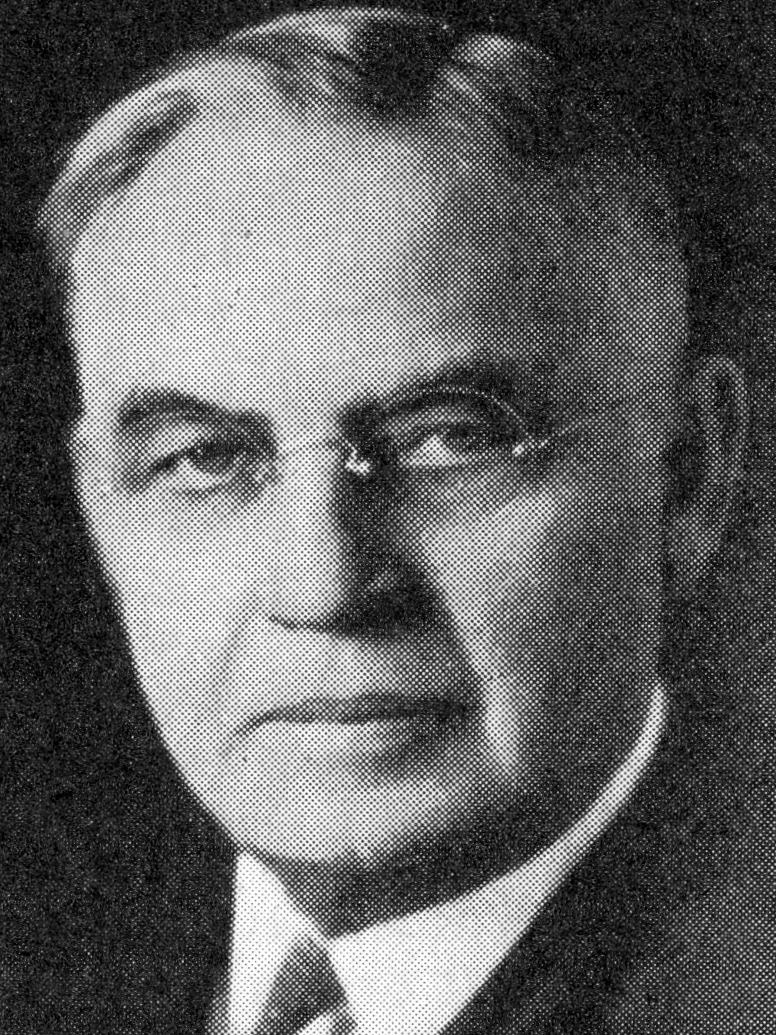
- Rosenberry circa 1940

13th Chief Justice of the Wisconsin Supreme Court
- In office March 23, 1929 – January 1950
- Preceded by: Aad J. Vinje
- Succeeded by: Oscar M. Fritz

Justice of the Wisconsin Supreme Court
- In office February 12, 1916 – January 1950
- Appointed by: Emanuel L. Philipp
- Preceded by: John Barnes
- Succeeded by: Edward J. Gehl

Personal details
- Born: Marvin Bristol Rosenberry; February 12, 1868 River Styx, Ohio, U.S.
- Died: February 15, 1958 (aged 90) University Hospital, Madison, Wisconsin, U.S.
- Resting place: Pine Grove Cemetery, Wausau, Wisconsin
- Spouses: Kate Landfair (m. 1897; died 1917) Lois Carter (Kimball) Mathews (m. 1918; died 1958)
- Children: 3 with Kate Landfair; Florence Amelia Rosenberry^{(b. 1898; died 1902)}; Katherine Landfair (White)^{(b. 1901; died 1947)}; Samuel Landfair Rosenberry^{(b. 1903; died 1973)}
- Parents: Samuel Charles Rosenberry (father); Mary Amelia Hitchcock (mother)
- Education: University of Michigan Law School
- Profession: lawyer, judge

Marvin Bristol Rosenberry (February 12, 1868 – February 15, 1958) was an American lawyer and judge from the U.S. state of Wisconsin. He was the 13th chief justice of the Wisconsin Supreme Court, and was the longest-serving chief justice in the court's history, having served nearly 21 years in the role (1929–1950). After his retirement from the court, he served as chairman of a special commission for Redistricting in Wisconsin in 1950; the commission was referred to as the Rosenberry Commission, and is the only example in Wisconsin history of a nonpartisan commission resulting in the successful enactment of a redistricting plan.

== Biography ==
Born in River Styx, Ohio, Rosenberry and his family moved to Fulton, Michigan, where they had a farm. Rosenberry went to what is now Eastern Michigan University and then taught school for a few years. He then received his law degree from the University of Michigan Law School and opened a law office in Wausau, Wisconsin.

In 1916, he was appointed to the Wisconsin Supreme Court and, in 1929, Rosenberry became chief justice of the Supreme Court serving until his retirement in 1950. For almost 21 of his nearly 34 years on the bench, Rosenberry served as chief justice. By the time of his retirement, his opinions were published in 91 volumes of the Wisconsin Reports and he had participated in more than 11,000 cases, approximately 50 percent of all cases heard before the Wisconsin Supreme Court since its inception.

== Rosenberry Redistricting Commission ==
In 1950, the state had not passed a full redistricting plan in 30 years. Responding to the courts and public opinion, the Legislature appointed a special redistricting committee and asked Judge Rosenberry to chair. Rosenberry took up the duty, the commission produced a viable plan within four months, and the Legislature passed the plan in the 1951 session (1951 Wisc. Act 728). After two more years of political wrangling, the plan was utilized in 1954 and remained the state district plan through 1963. During the wrangling over the plan, the Wisconsin Supreme Court ruled that the Legislature could only enact one redistricting plan per census.

== Personal life and family ==
Marvin Rosenberry was the eldest of at least 8 children born to Samuel Charles Rosenberry (1846–1928) and his wife Mary Amelia (née Hitchcock; 1845–1927). The Rosenberry family were descendants of Heinrich Rosenberger, who emigrated from the Swiss Confederacy to the Province of Pennsylvania in the early 1700s.

Marvin Rosenberry married Katherine A. Landfair on September 2, 1897, at Leslie, Michigan. They had three children together, though one died in childhood. Katherine died of a stroke in 1917. A year later, Rosenberry married Dr. Lois Carter Mathews (née Kimball), who was also a widow. Lois was a doctor of history, and dean of women at the University of Wisconsin at the time of their wedding, she had also previously been chair of the history departments at Wellesley College and Vassar College. Rosenberry's second marriage lasted the rest of his life, with Lois surviving him by 7 months.

Rosenberry's son, Samuel, went on to become a prominent attorney in New York City, working much of his career for the New York Stock Exchange.

Legal offices
Preceded by John Barnes	Justice of the Wisconsin Supreme Court; February 12, 1916 – January 1950	Succeeded by Edward J. Gehl
Preceded by Aad J. Vinje	Chief Justice of the Wisconsin Supreme Court; March 23, 1929 – January 1950	Succeeded by Oscar M. Fritz
