= Stewart G. Honeck =

American lawyer and politician (1906–1999)

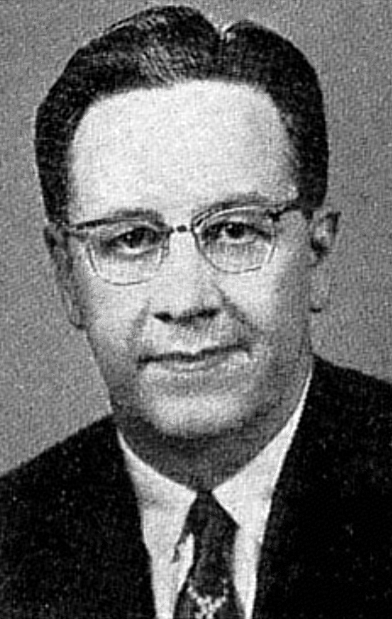

33rd Attorney General of Wisconsin
- In office January 7, 1957 – January 5, 1959
- Governor: Vernon W. Thomson
- Preceded by: Vernon W. Thomson
- Succeeded by: John W. Reynolds Jr.

Personal details
- Born: Stewart George Honeck Jr. December 25, 1906 Chicago, Illinois, U.S.
- Died: March 27, 1999 (aged 92) Fort Myers, Florida, U.S.
- Resting place: Wisconsin Memorial Park, Brookfield, Wisconsin
- Party: Republican
- Spouse: Lillian Carter Sewall (m. 1939–1999)
- Children: 4
- Education: Marquette University Law School
- Profession: Lawyer

Stewart George Honeck Jr. (December 25, 1906 – March 27, 1999) was an American lawyer and Republican politician from Milwaukee County, Wisconsin. He was the 33rd attorney general of Wisconsin, serving from 1957 to 1959.

== Biography ==
Born in Chicago, Illinois, Honeck graduated from Riverside High School in Milwaukee, Wisconsin, and went on to earn his LL.B. from Marquette University Law School in 1929. During his senior year, he was editor-in-chief of the Marquette Law Review. He was admitted to the bar that year and began practicing law in Milwaukee. He was active throughout his career with the Republican Party of Wisconsin, and served on several state commissions, including the Medical Grievance Committee and the Committee on Public Records. In 1846, he was appointed as deputy attorney general under Attorney General John E. Martin, and continued in that role under Martin's next three successors—both Democrat and Republican. He argued many cases on behalf of the state of Wisconsin, most notably the 1954 United States Supreme Court case Phillips Petroleum Co. v. Wisconsin, where Honeck successfully defended a Wisconsin law which sought to close a loophole in federal regulation of natural gas prices.

In 1956, he was the Republican nominee for Attorney General of Wisconsin and prevailed in the general election, receiving 54% of the vote. He sought re-election in 1958, but was defeated by Democrat John W. Reynolds Jr.

After leaving office, Honeck made two attempts to run for Wisconsin Supreme Court. He ran in the extremely crowded 1959 Wisconsin Supreme Court primary, challenging recently-appointed justice E. Harold Hallows. He survived the eight-person primary and went on to face Hallows in the April general election. Hallows narrowly prevailed, with just over 51% of the vote, and went on to later become the 20th chief justice of the Wisconsin Supreme Court. Honeck ran for Wisconsin Supreme Court again in 1961, after chief justice John E. Martin announced he would not seek re-election. Honeck received the most votes in the nonpartisan primary, but fell short again in the April general election, losing another close election this time to Myron L. Gordon.

Honeck did not run for public office again. He resumed his legal career in Milwaukee, co-founding the law firm Honeck, Manthye & Arndt, where he practiced for the next 20 years. He retired to Fort Myers, Florida, and died there of heart failure on March 27, 1999.

== Personal life and family ==
Stewart Honeck married Lillian "Lynn" Carter Sewall in 1939. They had one son and four daughters, and were married for 60 years before dying within a month of each other in 1999. While Honeck was serving as Attorney General, his wife Lynn hosted Madison's first television talk show, The Lynn Honeck Show, on WKOW. After moving to Milwaukee, she was also briefly co-host of the show Open House 12 on WISN-TV.

== Electoral history ==
=== Wisconsin Attorney General (1956, 1958) ===
1956 Wisconsin Attorney General election
Party	Candidate	Votes	%	±%
General Election, November 6, 1956
Republican	Stewart G. Honeck	805,353	54.31%	−1.90%
Democratic	Robert La Follette Sucher	629,861	42.48%	−1.32%
Independent	Frank Nikolay	47,643	3.21%	
Plurality		175,492	11.83%	-0.58%
Total votes		1,482,857	100.0%	+32.75%

1958 Wisconsin Attorney General election
Party	Candidate	Votes	%	±%
General Election, November 4, 1958
Democratic	John W. Reynolds Jr.	617,586	53.67%	+11.19%
Republican	Stewart G. Honeck	533,131	46.33%	−7.98%
Plurality		84,455	7.34%	-4.50%
Total votes		1,150,717	100.0%	-22.40%

=== Wisconsin Supreme Court (1959) ===
1959 Wisconsin Supreme Court election
Party	Candidate	Votes	%	±%
Nonpartisan Primary, March 10, 1959
Nonpartisan	E. Harold Hallows (incumbent)	61,697	27.55%	
Nonpartisan	Stewart G. Honeck	42,381	18.93%	
Nonpartisan	Bruno V. Bitker	39,297	17.55%	
Nonpartisan	Willis E. Donley	21,807	9.74%	
Nonpartisan	Harry Halloway	20,631	9.21%	
Nonpartisan	John E. Krueger	18,975	8.47%	
Nonpartisan	William S. Clark	14,380	6.42%	
Nonpartisan	Christ Alexopoulos	4,747	2.12%	
Total votes		223,915	100.0%	
General Election, April 7, 1959
Nonpartisan	E. Harold Hallows (incumbent)	326,510	51.28%	
Nonpartisan	Stewart G. Honeck	310,168	48.72%	
Plurality		16,342	2.57%	
Total votes		636,678	100.0%	

=== Wisconsin Supreme Court (1961) ===
1961 Wisconsin Supreme Court election
Party	Candidate	Votes	%	±%
Nonpartisan Primary, March 7, 1961
Nonpartisan	Stewart G. Honeck	177,890	51.21%	
Nonpartisan	Myron L. Gordon	145,270	41.82%	
Nonpartisan	Christ Alexopoulos	24,230	6.97%	
Total votes		347,390	100.0%	
General Election, April 4, 1961
Nonpartisan	Myron L. Gordon	399,408	52.16%	
Nonpartisan	Stewart G. Honeck	366,390	47.84%	
Plurality		33,018	4.31%	
Total votes		765,798	100.0%	

Party political offices
Preceded by Vernon Wallace Thomson	Republican nominee for Attorney General of Wisconsin; 1956, 1958	Succeeded by George Thompson
Legal offices
Preceded by Vernon W. Thomson	Attorney General of Wisconsin; 1957–1959	Succeeded by John W. Reynolds Jr.
