= 1979 Wisconsin Supreme Court election =

- April 3, 1979

Candidate	Shirley Abrahamson	Howard H. Boyle Jr.
Popular vote	547,003	292,919
Percentage	65.13%	34.87%
- Abrahamson: 50–60% 60–70% 70–80% 80–90% Boyle: 50–60%
Justice before election
Shirley Abrahamson
Elected Justice
Shirley Abrahamson

The 1979 Wisconsin Supreme Court election was held on April 3, 1979, to elect a justice to the Wisconsin Supreme Court for a ten-year term. Incumbent justice Shirley Abrahamson (who had been appointed to fill a vacancy) won the election, defeating Howard H. Boyle Jr.

== Background ==
On August 6, 1976, Governor Patrick Lucey appointed Shirley Abrahamson to fill the vacancy created by the death of Justice Horace W. Wilkie.

The Constitution of Wisconsin stipulates that early elections full terms can be triggered by a vacancy. The constitution stipulates that it is impermissible for more than one seat to be up for election in the same year. Elections must be moved to an earlier year after a vacancy, but only if there is a more immediate year without a scheduled contest. All supreme court elections are held during the spring elections in early April. Since there were was no supreme court election scheduled in 1979, but there were elections scheduled in 1977 and 1978, the vacancy moved the election to the next possible date, 1979. This allowed Wilkie's successor to serve as justice for two years before they would be up for election.

Ahead of the election, the court had 3 conservatives, 3 liberals, and 1 swing vote. Abrahamson was a member of the court's liberal wing.

== Candidates ==
- Shirley Abrahamson, incumbent justice (appointed)
- Howard H. Boyle Jr., attorney; unsuccessful candidate for Supreme Court in 1964 and 1965; unsuccessful candidate for U.S. Senate in 1956 and 1957

== Results ==
1979 Wisconsin Supreme Court election
Party	Candidate	Votes	%
General Election, April 3, 1979
Nonpartisan	Shirley Abrahamson (incumbent)	547,003	65.13
Nonpartisan	Howard H. Boyle Jr.	292,919	34.87
Plurality		254,084	30.25
Total votes		839,922	100
