= James Earl Leverich =

American politician (1891–1979)

Earl Leverich

Member of the Wisconsin Senate from the 31st district
- In office January 4, 1943 – January 2, 1967
- Preceded by: Amrose B. Coller
- Succeeded by: Raymond C. Johnson
- In office January 7, 1935 – January 2, 1939
- Preceded by: Orland Steen Loomis
- Succeeded by: Amrose B. Coller

Personal details
- Born: December 6, 1891 Angelo, Wisconsin, U.S.
- Died: December 27, 1979 (aged 88) Sparta, Wisconsin, U.S.
- Resting place: Woodlawn Cemetery, Sparta, Wisconsin
- Party: Republican; Progressive (1934–1946)
- Spouse: Ada Bertha Birr (m. 1919–1979)
- Children: Robert, James, Mary

James Earl Leverich (December 6, 1891 – December 27, 1979) was an American dairy farmer, strawberry grower, and Progressive Republican politician. He served 28 years in the Wisconsin State Senate (1935–1939, 1943–1967), and was chairman of the town of Angelo, Wisconsin, for 40 years (1931–1971). He went by his middle name Earl throughout his public career.

== Biography ==
Leverich was born, raised, and lived most of his life in the town of Angelo in Monroe County, Wisconsin. His father was a well-established farmer and prominent local leader, and Earl Leverich ultimately inherited the Leverich farm. He graduated from Sparta High School, in nearby Sparta, Wisconsin, and Madison College, in Madison, Wisconsin. He also attended the agricultural short course at the University of Wisconsin–Madison. In addition to running his farm, Leverich organized the Sparta Co-op Exchange, to market his strawberries, and was president of the Sparta Cooperative Creamery, which later became Hiawatha Valley Dairies, and now operates under Foremost Farms USA.

== Career ==
Leverich was a member of the Senate twice: first, during the 1935 and 1937 sessions, and second, from 1943 to 1965. He was a member of the Republican Party and of the Wisconsin Progressive Party.

Leverich was perhaps best known for his crusade against margarine, which continued throughout his entire political career. Margarine was seen as a threat to Wisconsin's dairy industry and was fiercely opposed by Wisconsin farmers. In 1931, Leverich helped organize an anti-margarine protest in Madison, Wisconsin. Six years later, as a member of the Senate, he worked to pass a ban on "colored" oleo, so that, in the state of Wisconsin, you could only purchase the pallid, uncolored oleomargarine, which resembled a lump of lard. As Chairman of the Senate Agriculture Committee, he maintained the ban on colored margarine until he left office. In the first year after he left office, the ban was repealed.

Leverich was defeated in the Republican primary in 1966. He had previously benefited from a state government apportionment practice which generally sacrificed equal representation for district compactness and strict adherence to county boundaries. In the 1964 court-ordered redistricting plan, the Wisconsin Supreme Court radically split from the past adherence to county boundaries in an attempt to draw districts with more equitable population distribution. The new 31st district added the more urban and populous Eau Claire County to Leverich's previously mostly-rural district. In the new district, Eau Claire County represented about half of the votes, and Republican primary voters chose young Eau Claire attorney Raymond C. Johnson over the Monroe County farmer, Leverich.

Leverich retired from local government a few years later, turning over his seat as chairman of the Angelo Town Board to his son, Tom, in 1971. Although Leverich was not a pilot, he was interested in aviation, and for many years offered to sell a tract of his property for the creation of a small municipal airport. The city of Sparta eventually purchased that land and created Sparta/Fort McCoy Airport.

Earl Leverich died in his sleep at St. Mary's Hospital, in Sparta, Wisconsin, on December 27, 1979. He had been hospitalized for planned surgery.

== Personal life and family ==
Leverich was the son of James Woodhull "J.W." Leverich, who was a prominent farmer in the town of Angelo. James Leverich was also involved in local politics, he served 44 years on the Monroe County Board of Supervisors and was chairman of the county board for 10 years. He was also chairman of the Angelo town board from 1899 until his death in 1931.

Earl Leverich married Ada Bertha Birr, of Watertown, Wisconsin, on September 3, 1919. Ada Leverich was a teacher in Angelo and Warrens, Wisconsin. Earl and Ada Leverich had two sons and one daughter. Ada died in 1983, at the time of her death, they had 9 grandchildren and 4 great-grandchildren.

Following his death, Earl was succeeded as town chair by his son, Robert "Tom" Leverich. When Tom retired in 2013, he ended a 124 year streak of the Leverich family governing as chairmen of Angelo, Wisconsin. His son, Jim, still serves on the town board, though, and maintains the family farm.

Wisconsin Senate
Preceded by Orland Steen Loomis	Member of the Wisconsin Senate from the 31st district January 7, 1935 – January 2, 1939	Succeeded by Amrose B. Coller
Preceded by Amrose B. Coller	Member of the Wisconsin Senate from the 31st district January 4, 1943 – January 2, 1967	Succeeded by Raymond C. Johnson
