= 1961 Wisconsin Supreme Court election =

- April 4, 1961

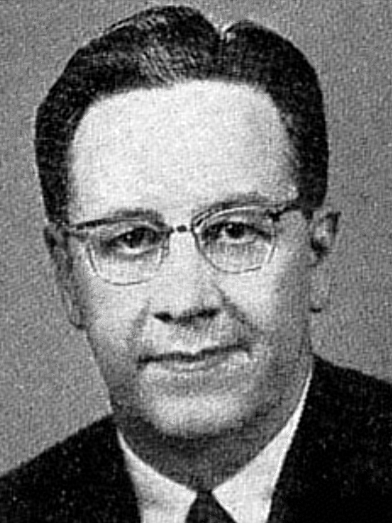
| Candidate | Myron L. Gordon | Stewart G. Honeck |
| Popular vote | 399,408 | 366,390 |
| Percentage | 52.16% | 47.84% |
Justice before election
John E. Martin
Elected Justice
Myron L. Gordon

The 1961 Wisconsin Supreme Court election was held on Tuesday, April 4, 1961 to elect a justice to the Wisconsin Supreme Court for a ten-year term. The April general election was preceded by a nonpartisan primary election on March 7, 1961. Circuit Court judge Myron L. Gordon won election to succeed incumbent justice John E. Martin (who did not seek re-election). He defeated Stewart G. Honeck (former Wisconsin attorney general) in the general election.

== Candidates ==
- Christ Alexopoulos, Milwaukee-based attorney and perennial judicial candidate (Note: Alexopolous had unsuccessfully run For Wisconsin Supreme Court in 1959; had unsuccessfully run for Circuit Court in 1960; and had run other civil court campaigns as far back as 1954. He would later unsuccessfully run again for Supreme Court in 1963, 1974, 1975, and 1976; and again for Circuit Court in 1962)
- Myron L. Gordon, circuit court judge
- Stewart G. Honeck, former Wisconsin attorney general (1957–59) and unsuccessful candidate in the 1959 Supreme Court election

== Results ==
1961 Wisconsin Supreme Court election
| Party | Candidate | Votes | % | ±% |
|---|---|---|---|---|
Nonpartisan Primary, March 7, 1961
| Nonpartisan | Stewart G. Honeck | 177,890 | 51.21 | |
| Nonpartisan | Myron L. Gordon | 145,270 | 41.82 | |
| Nonpartisan | Christ Alexopoulos | 24,230 | 6.97 | |
| Total votes | | 347,390 | 100 | |
General Election, April 4, 1961
| Nonpartisan | Myron L. Gordon | 399,408 | 52.16 | |
| Nonpartisan | Stewart G. Honeck | 366,390 | 47.84 | |
| Plurality | | 33,018 | 4.31 | |
| Total votes | | 765,798 | 100 | |
