= 1976 Wisconsin Supreme Court election =

- April 6, 1976

Candidate	Roland B. Day	Leander J. Foley Jr.
Popular vote	621,885	546,721
Percentage	53.22%	46.78%
Justice before election
Roland B. Day
Elected Justice
Roland B. Day

The 1976 Wisconsin Supreme Court election was held on April 6, 1976, to elect a justice to the Wisconsin Supreme Court for a ten-year term. Incumbent justice Roland B. Day (who had been appointed in 1974 to fill a vacancy) was elected.

== Background ==
Incumbent Justice Roland B. Day had been appointed in 1974 by Governor Patrick J. Lucey to fill a vacancy on the court created by the retirement of E. Harold Hallows, who retired due to the mandatory retirement age of 70. In accordance with the specifications of the state constitution, the 1976 election was an early contest for the seat and was for a fresh ten-year full term (as opposed to being a special election to only a partial unexpired term).

The general election coincided with the Wisconsin presidential primaries.

== Candidates ==
Advanced to general election

- Roland B. Day, incumbent justice since 1974
- Leander Foley, Wisconsin Circuit Court judge since 1959

Eliminated in primary

- Christ Alexopoulos, attorney from Milwaukee, perennial judicial candidate (Note: Alexopolous had unsuccessfully run For Wisconsin Supreme Court in 1959, 1961, 1963, 1974, 1975; had unsuccessfully run for Circuit Court in 1960 and 1962; and had run other civil court campaigns as far back as 1954)

== Campaign ==
Much of the discourse of the campaign centered upon the request of court's incumbent justices' (including Day) that the state establish an intermediate appellate court. Both Foley and Alexopolous were opponents of this proposal, arguing that such a court would be an unnecessary use of tax dollars and would increase the legal fees incurred by litigants seeking to fight their cases all the way to the Supreme Court. As an alternative, Foley proposed expanding the Supreme Court from seven justices to eleven, and splinting it into two panels (one sitting for civil cases, one sitting criminal cases, and the full court membership sitting only for the most consequential matters).

Foley also spoke against the general approach of many judges, who he argued often acted like legislators. He argued that many judges crafted solutions to social problems, rather than demanding that the legislature do its own job and legislate such solutions.

The Associated Press wrote of the political leanings of both Day and Foley, "both have Democratic trappings, but the Supreme Court ballot is nonpartisan."

Foley's lead over the incumbent Day in the primary election was widely regarded as a surprise. His vote lead in the primary was widely attributable to a strong showing for him in Milwaukee County, a populous county in which he was a longtime elected judge. During the general election, Day's rhetoric centered on asserting that Wisconsin courts needed to be harder on criminals, leading many analysts to believe he adopted "tough-on-crime" rhetoric in an attempt to overcome a deficit of support evidenced in the primary elections result. Foley accused Day of adopting a tough stance on crime in response to his showing in the primary, arguing that Day's record on crime was in-fact less tough than his own record on crime. Foley also characterized Day as inexperienced; noting that before his recent appointment to the Court, Day had lacked any judicial experience.

== Results ==
1976 Wisconsin Supreme Court election
Party	Candidate	Votes	%
Primary election (February 17, 1976)
Nonpartisan	Leander J. Foley Jr.	186,688	50.48
Nonpartisan	Roland B. Day (incumbent)	130,006	35.15
Nonpartisan	Christ Alexopoulos	53,127	14.37
Total votes		369,821	100
General election (April 6, 1976)
Nonpartisan	Roland B. Day (incumbent)	621,885	53.22
Nonpartisan	Leander J. Foley Jr.	546,721	46.78
Total votes		1,168,606	100
