= 1974 Wisconsin Supreme Court election =

- April 2, 1974

Candidate	Horace W. Wilkie	Raymond C. Johnson
Popular vote	441,241	317,346
Percentage	58.17%	41.83%
- Wilkie: 50–60% 60–70% 70–80% Johnson: 50–60% 60–70% 70–80%
Justice before election
Horace W. Wilkie
Elected Justice
Horace W. Wilkie

The 1974 Wisconsin Supreme Court election was held on April 2, 1974, to elect a justice to the Wisconsin Supreme Court for a ten-year term. Incumbent justice Horace W. Wilkie (who had held the seat since 1962) was re-elected to a second ten-year term.

== Background ==
Wilkie was the second-most senior tenured justice on the court. Since seniority of tenure determined the court's chief justice at the time, and incumbent chief justice E. Harold Hallows would imminently need to retire upon reaching the mandatory retirement age of 70, the 1974 election would have the impact of determining the court's next chief justice. If Wilkie were re-elected, he would be poised to soon become chief justice. However, if Wilkie were defeated, then Bruce F. Beilfuss (the next-most senior judge) would instead become chief justice.

== Primary election ==
=== Candidates ===
==== Advanced to general election ====
- Horace W. Wilkie, incumbent justice
- Raymond C. Johnson, Republican senate majority leader from the 31st district

==== Eliminated in primary ====
- Christ Alexopoulos, Milwaukee-based attorney and perennial judicial candidate (Note: Alexopolous had unsuccessfully run for Wisconsin Supreme Court in 1959, 1961, 1963; had unsuccessfully run for Circuit Court in 1960 and 1962; and had run other civil court campaigns as far back as 1954. He would later unsuccessfully run again for Supreme Court in 1975 and 1976)

=== Primary Campaign ===
While Wisconsin Supreme Court elections are non-partisan, Wilkie had earlier in his career run several campaigns for partisan office as a Democrat and Johnson was an incumbent Republican legislator.

At the close of the primary election campaign, Wilkie criticized Johnson's television ads. Wilkie called it "unethical" of Johnson to have run television and radio that characterized Wilkie of engaging in impropriety by accepting campaign contributions from attorneys while a sitting justice. Wilkie remarked, "suggestions have been made that lawyers should be prohibited from contributing in judicial campaigns. In my opinion this would take away a basic civil right of each lawyer in a totally discriminatory way." Johnson responded by arguing his ads merely raised the question of whether lawyers should be solicited for money by an incumbent justice, to which Wilkie noted his campaign committee was an independent committee and that he was not himself soliciting donations.

Despite projections of pleasant weather on the day of the primary, low turnout was anticipated due to the Supreme Court race (the only statewide office on the ballot) generating little excitement amongst the state's electorate.

=== Results ===
Primary results by county: Wilkie: Wilkie—30–40%; Wilkie—40–50%; Wilkie—50–60%; Wilkie—60–70%; Wilkie—70–80%; Johnson: Johnson—40–50%; Johnson—50–60%; Johnson—60–70%; Johnson—70–80%; Johnson—80–90%

1974 Wisconsin Supreme Court primary election
Party	Candidate	Votes	%
Nonpartisan	Horace W. Wilkie (incumbent)	128,800	52.14%
Nonpartisan	Raymond C. Johnson	93,967	38.04%
Nonpartisan	Christ Alexopoulos	24,276	9.82%
Total votes		247,043	100.0%

== General election ==
=== Campaign ===
Following the primary, Johnson was endorsed by several caucuses of the state Republican Party, as well as several elected Republican officials. Wilkie received the endorsement of Wisconsin Educators Politically Active and Concerned (WEPAC, the political arm of the Wisconsin Education Association Council). Shortly before the general election, Wisconsin Democratic senator Gaylord Nelson endorsed Wilkie for re-election. Johnson criticized the endorsement as "unethical", alleging it violated a judicial ethics code rule. Wilkie refuted Johnson's criticism as inaccurate, and hypocritical (given Johnson's endorsements from Republican officeholders).

=== Results ===
1974 Wisconsin Supreme Court election
Party	Candidate	Votes	%	±%
Nonpartisan	Horace W. Wilkie (incumbent)	441,241	58.17%	+4.97%
Nonpartisan	Raymond C. Johnson	317,346	41.83%	N/A
Total votes		758,587	100.0%	-27.50%
Majority		123,895	16.33	+9.93
