= Shirley Abrahamson =

American judge (1933–2020)

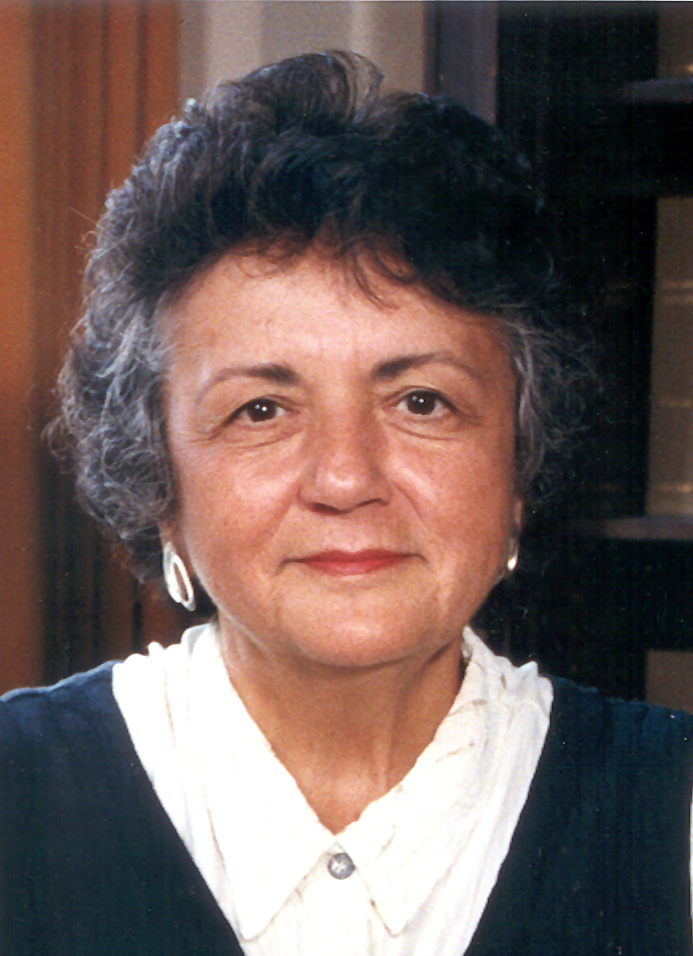

25th Chief Justice of the Wisconsin Supreme Court
- In office August 1, 1996 – April 29, 2015
- Preceded by: Roland B. Day
- Succeeded by: Patience D. Roggensack

Justice of the Wisconsin Supreme Court
- In office September 7, 1976 – August 1, 2019
- Appointed by: Patrick Lucey
- Preceded by: Horace W. Wilkie
- Succeeded by: Brian Hagedorn

Personal details
- Born: Shirley Schlanger; December 17, 1933 New York City, U.S.
- Died: December 19, 2020 (aged 87) Berkeley, California, U.S.
- Spouse: Seymour Abrahamson (m. 1953; died 2016)
- Children: 1
- Education: New York University (BA); Indiana University, Bloomington (JD); University of Wisconsin, Madison (LLM, SJD)

Shirley Schlanger Abrahamson (December 17, 1933 – December 19, 2020) was the 25th chief justice of the Wisconsin Supreme Court. An American lawyer and jurist, she was appointed to the court in 1976 by Governor Patrick Lucey, becoming the first female justice to serve on Wisconsin's highest court. She became the court's first female chief justice on August 1, 1996, and served in that capacity until April 29, 2015. In all, she served on the court for 43 years (1976–2019), making her the longest-serving justice in the history of the Wisconsin Supreme Court.

== Early life and career ==
Abrahamson was born Shirley Schlanger in New York City, the daughter of Polish Jewish immigrants, Leo and Ceil (Sauerteig) Schlanger. She graduated from New York's Hunter College High School and in 1953 received her bachelor's degree from New York University. She continued her education at Indiana University Law School, earning her J.D. in 1956 with high distinction and graduating first in her class. At Indiana, she met her husband, Seymour Abrahamson, and moved with him to Madison, Wisconsin, for his post-doctoral work in zoology.

In Madison, Abrahamson joined the University of Wisconsin faculty as a lecturer in constitutional law and political science, and worked as a research assistant at the law school. She continued her education at the University of Wisconsin Law School and earned a S.J.D. in American legal history in 1962, writing her doctoral thesis on the legal history of Wisconsin's dairy industry.

Also in 1962, at age 28, Abrahamson became the first female lawyer hired by the Madison law firm La Follette, Sinykin, Doyle & Anderson. Within a year, she was named a partner in the law firm. She practiced law at the firm (later known as La Follette, Sinykin, Anderson & Abrahamson) for the next 14 years and continued teaching at the University of Wisconsin Law School.

== Judicial career ==
Early portrait of Abrahamson as a justice

On August 6, 1976, Governor Patrick Lucey appointed Abrahamson to the Wisconsin Supreme Court, filling the vacancy caused by the death of justice Horace W. Wilkie. On September 7, she was sworn in as the first woman to serve on Wisconsin's highest court. Lucey said he hoped her appointment would encourage more women to become involved in law and government, adding, "It is appalling that currently there are no women serving on any level in the state judicial system." Abrahamson was elected to a full term on the court in 1979, with 65% of the vote. She was reelected in 1989, 1999, and 2009—one of the few Wisconsin judges to face an opponent in each of her elections.

Abrahamson was considered to be a member of the court's ideologically liberal wing.

Under the Wisconsin constitution, from 1889 until 2015, the chief justice of the Wisconsin Supreme Court was determined by seniority—the longest-serving member of the court would become the chief justice until death or retirement. In 1994, longtime chief justice Nathan Heffernan announced he would retire at the end of his term, set to expire July 31, 1995. His successor by seniority was Justice Roland B. Day, who, at age 76, was also planning to retire at the end of his current term, ending July 31, 1996. Abrahamson was the next most senior member of the court. On his ascension to chief justice, Day told Abrahamson, "I'm going to be chief for a year. You're going to be chief for a long time." On August 1, 1996, Abrahamson became the Wisconsin Supreme Court's first female chief justice. True to Day's prediction, she became the second longest-serving chief justice in Wisconsin history.

Abrahamson authored more than 450 majority opinions and participated in more than 3,500 written decisions of the court. She was involved in deciding more than 10,000 petitions for review, bypasses, certifications and lawyer and judicial discipline cases.

Abrahamson was a member of the Council of the American Law Institute and served on the board of directors of the Dwight D. Opperman Institute of Judicial Administration at New York University School of Law. She has been president of the Conference of Chief Justices and chair of the Board of Directors of the National Center for State Courts and has served on the Board of Visitors of several law schools. She served as a member of the United States National Academies Committee on Science, Technology and Law, and was chair of the National Institute of Justice Committee on the Future of DNA Evidence.

In 1997 Abrahamson was elected a Fellow of the American Academy of Arts and Sciences, and in 1998 she was elected a member of the American Philosophical Society, two scholarly societies in the United States. She was a member of the Wisconsin Academy of Arts and Sciences. In 2004 she was awarded the first annual Dwight Opperman Award for Judicial Excellence by the American Judicature Society. She has received the Margaret Brent Award from the American Bar Association.

Abrahamson has received numerous other awards and 15 honorary degrees from universities and colleges across the U.S. She is featured in Great (Top 100) American Judges: An Encyclopedia (2003), The Lawdragon 500 Leading Lawyers in America (2005), and The Lawdragon 500 Leading Judges in America (2006).

=== Chief Justice amendment controversy ===
In the April 2015 spring election, voters narrowly approved an amendment to the Wisconsin constitution that changed the way that the chief justice of the Supreme Court was selected. Since 1889, the justice with the most seniority held the position, but the amendment allowed court members to choose the chief. According to Abrahamson's opinion in the 2002 case State v. Gonzalez, "[U]nless a constitutional amendment provides otherwise, it takes effect upon the certification of a statewide canvass of the votes." Thus on April 29, 2015, the same day the Wisconsin Government Accountability Board certified the vote canvass, the conservative majority on the court elected Patience D. Roggensack as the new chief justice.

Abrahamson filed a federal lawsuit challenging the immediate implementation of the constitutional amendment, contending that she should remain chief justice until the expiration of her term in 2019. Her lawsuit was heard on May 15, 2015. Five of the seven justices asked the federal judge to dismiss Abrahamson's lawsuit. That day, the federal court denied Abrahamson's request for immediate reinstatement as chief justice. U.S. District Judge James D. Peterson determined there was no harm in Roggensack serving as chief justice while Abrahamson's lawsuit continued. Abrahamson appealed that decision to the U.S. Seventh Circuit Court of Appeals, but dropped the lawsuit on November 10, deciding that no matter what happened in her lawsuit, her term would be close to ending by the time the litigation finally ended.

=== Retirement ===
On May 30, 2018, Abrahamson announced she would not seek reelection to the Wisconsin Supreme Court in 2019. She left office July 31, 2019, having served for 43 years—the longest term in the Court's history. She was the only woman on the high court from 1976 until 1993; in her final three years, the court had a 5–2 female majority.

== Personal life ==
Shirley Schlanger took the last name Abrahamson when she married Seymour Abrahamson in August 1953. Seymour was a professor of zoology and a world-renowned geneticist. They had one son, Daniel, who followed his mother into the legal profession. The Abrahamsons had been married nearly 63 years at the time of Seymour's death from cancer in July 2016.

In August 2018, Justice Abrahamson announced she had been diagnosed with cancer. Following her retirement, she moved to Berkeley, California, to be closer to her son and his family and went into hospice care in 2020. Due to the COVID-19 pandemic, she was mostly only able to interact with her family through a window or via video call, but was able to see her son in person shortly before her death. She died of pancreatic cancer on December 19, 2020.

== Electoral history ==
=== Wisconsin Supreme Court (1979–2009) ===
1979 Wisconsin Supreme Court election
Party	Candidate	Votes	%
General Election, April 3, 1979
Nonpartisan	Shirley S. Abrahamson (incumbent)	547,003	65.13%
Nonpartisan	Howard H. Boyle Jr.	292,919	34.87%
Plurality		254,084	30.25%
Total votes		839,922	100.0%

1989 Wisconsin Supreme Court election
Party	Candidate	Votes	%
General Election, April 4, 1989
Nonpartisan	Shirley S. Abrahamson (incumbent)	485,169	54.97%
Nonpartisan	Ralph Adam Fine	397,378	45.03%
Plurality		87,791	9.95%
Total votes		882,547	100.0%

1999 Wisconsin Supreme Court election
Party	Candidate	Votes	%
General Election, April 6, 1999
Nonpartisan	Shirley S. Abrahamson (incumbent)	481,281	63.41%
Nonpartisan	Sharren B. Rose	276,584	36.44%
	Scattering	1,100	0.14%
Plurality		204,697	26.97%
Total votes		758,965	100.0%

2009 Wisconsin Supreme Court election
Party	Candidate	Votes	%
General Election, April 7, 2009
Nonpartisan	Shirley S. Abrahamson (incumbent)	473,712	59.67%
Nonpartisan	Randy R. Koschnick	319,706	40.27%
	Scattering	446	0.06%
Plurality		154,006	19.40%
Total votes		793,864	100.0%

== See also ==
- List of female state supreme court justices

Legal offices
Preceded by Horace W. Wilkie	Justice of the Wisconsin Supreme Court; 1976–2019	Succeeded by Brian Hagedorn
Preceded by Roland B. Day	Chief Justice of the Wisconsin Supreme Court; 1996–2015	Succeeded by Patience D. Roggensack
