= 1975 Wisconsin Supreme Court election =

- April 1, 1975

Candidate	Nathan Heffernan	Christ Alexopoulus
Popular vote	521,009	177,686
Percentage	74.57%	25.43%
- Heffernan: 60–70% 70–80% 80–90% Alexopoulus: 50–60%
Justice before election
Nathan Heffernan
Elected Justice
Nathan Heffernan

The 1975 Wisconsin Supreme Court election was held on April 1, 1975, to elect a justice to the Wisconsin Supreme Court for a ten-year term. Incumbent justice Nathan Heffernan (who had held the seat since 1964) was re-elected.

== Background ==
The election (for 10-year term as justice on the Wisconsin Supreme Court) coincided with the vote on four statewide ballot measures.

== Candidates ==
- Christ Alexopoulos, Milwaukee-based attorney and perennial judicial candidate (Note: Alexopolous had unsuccessfully run For Wisconsin Supreme Court in 1959, 1961, 1963, 1974; had unsuccessfully run for Circuit Court in 1960 and 1962; and had run for civil court in 1954. He would later unsuccessfully run again for Supreme Court in 1976)
- Nathan Heffernan, incumbent justice

== Campaign ==
The incumbent Heffernan was heavily favored to win over Alexopoloulos (a perennial candidate with seven previous unsuccessful judicial campaigns, who had never held public office). No significant controversies arose in the campaign.

== Results ==
1975 Wisconsin Supreme Court election
Party	Candidate	Votes	%	±%
General election (April 1, 1975)
Nonpartisan	Nathan Heffernan (incumbent)	521,009	74.6	+23.68
Nonpartisan	Christ Alexopoulos	177,686	25.4	
