= Lynn Adelman =

American judge (born 1939)

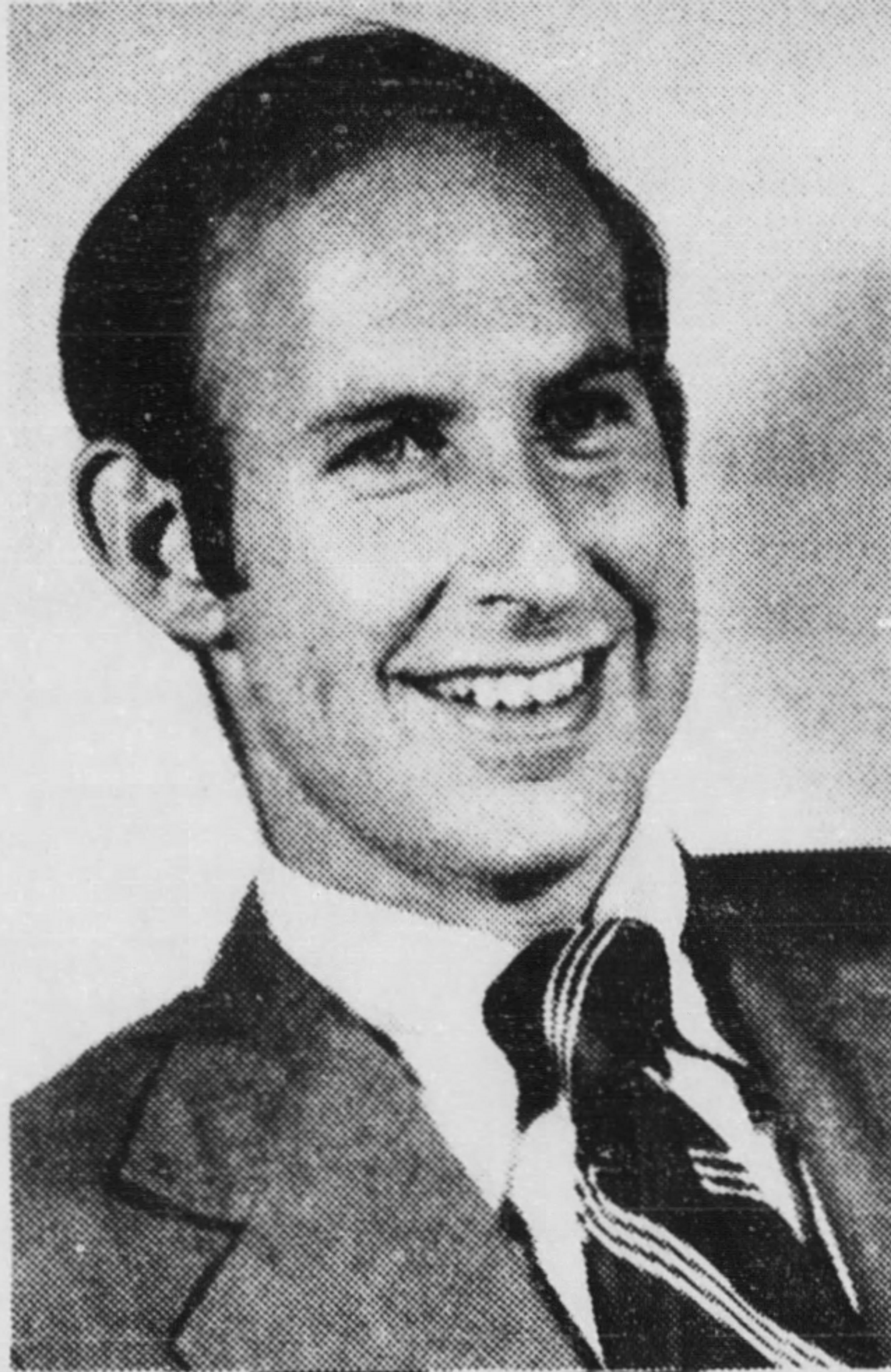

Judge of the United States District Court for the Eastern District of Wisconsin
- Incumbent
- Assumed office December 23, 1997
- Appointed by: Bill Clinton
- Preceded by: Thomas John Curran

Member of the Wisconsin Senate from the 28th district
- In office January 3, 1977 – December 23, 1997
- Preceded by: James Devitt
- Succeeded by: Mary Lazich

Personal details
- Born: Lynn Steven Adelman; October 1, 1939 (age 87) Milwaukee, Wisconsin, U.S.
- Party: Democratic
- Spouse: Elizabeth L. "Betty" Halmbacher (m. 1976)
- Education: Princeton University (BA); Columbia University (LLB)

Lynn Steven Adelman (born October 1, 1939) is an American lawyer and former politician. He has served as a United States district judge for the United States District Court for the Eastern District of Wisconsin since December 1997. Prior to becoming a federal judge, he served 20 years as a Democratic member of the Wisconsin Senate, representing southwest Milwaukee County and neighboring municipalities from 1977 to 1997. He also ran three times for the U.S. House of Representatives in 1974, 1982, and 1984.

== Early life and education ==
Adelman was born in Milwaukee. He received a Bachelor of Arts degree from Princeton University in 1961 and a Bachelor of Laws from Columbia Law School in 1965.

== Career ==
Adelman was a research assistant at Columbia from 1965 to 1966. He was a trial attorney for the Legal Aid Society of Wisconsin from 1967 to 1968, and then entered private practice in Milwaukee in 1968. In 1993, Adelman represented Todd Mitchell, a black man convicted of a racially motivated attack against a 14-year old white boy, in Wisconsin v. Mitchell, a landmark first amendment case.

=== Political career ===
Wisconsin's 9th congressional district 1972–1981.

Adelman made his first bid for elected office in 1974, running for U.S. House of Representatives and seeking to oust ten-term Republican incumbent Glenn Robert Davis from Wisconsin's 9th congressional district. Davis, who was a close ally of then-president Richard Nixon, was politically wounded by the Watergate scandal and Nixon's other recent controversies. Adelman focused much of his campaign on issues of executive overreach and the need for Congress to re-assert its authority. Davis, however, was defeated in the Republican primary by moderate Republican Bob Kasten. The general election was one of the most hotly-contested in the state, with both campaigns breaching campaign finance limits that had existed at that time—Adelman spent about $104,000 and Kasten spent about $89,000 (adjusted for inflation, $677,000 and $579,000, respectively). Kasten defeated Adelman with 52% of the vote.

In the aftermath of the election, Adelman was critical of some of Kasten's early votes in Congress and seemed intent on a rematch in 1976. Rather than running again for Congress in 1976, Adelman moved south from Shorewood, Wisconsin—in northern Milwaukee County—to New Berlin, Wisconsin—in southeast Waukesha County. The move immediately sparked speculation that Adelman would instead run for Wisconsin Senate against Republican incumbent James Devitt in the 28th Senate district. Shortly after Adelman's move, newspapers broke the story that Devitt was the subject of a John Doe investigation relating to campaign finance violations during his run for governor in 1974. Adelman officially announced his candidacy in June 1976. Devitt was indicted a month later. Despite the indictment, Devitt won renomination against two Republican challengers. Adelman won the general election in a landslide, receiving nearly two thirds of the vote.

Wisconsin's 4th congressional district 1982–1991.

While serving his second term in the state Senate, Adelman made two more runs for U.S. House of Representatives—the 1980s redistricting had shifted Adelman from the 9th congressional district to the 4th district. In the first election under those new maps, Adelman launched a primary challenge against 17-term incumbent congressman Clement Zablocki. Zablocki had not had a competitive primary or general election since winning the office in 1948. In the campaign, Adelman sought to tie Zablocki to the economic policies of the Reagan administration in the midst of the early 1980s recession. Zablocki was sometimes seen as too conservative for his safely Democratic district, but he fended off the criticisms and distanced himself from Reagan, winning the primary with 60% of the vote.

Zablocki died just a year later and Adelman made another run in the special election to succeed him in the spring of 1984. He lost the primary to state senator Jerry Kleczka—another popular Polish Catholic from Milwaukee's south side.

Adelman went on to win re-election four more times in the 28th Senate district. Through much of his tenure in the Senate, he served on the committee overseeing the judiciary, and was chairman in the years when Democrats held the majority.

=== Federal judicial service ===
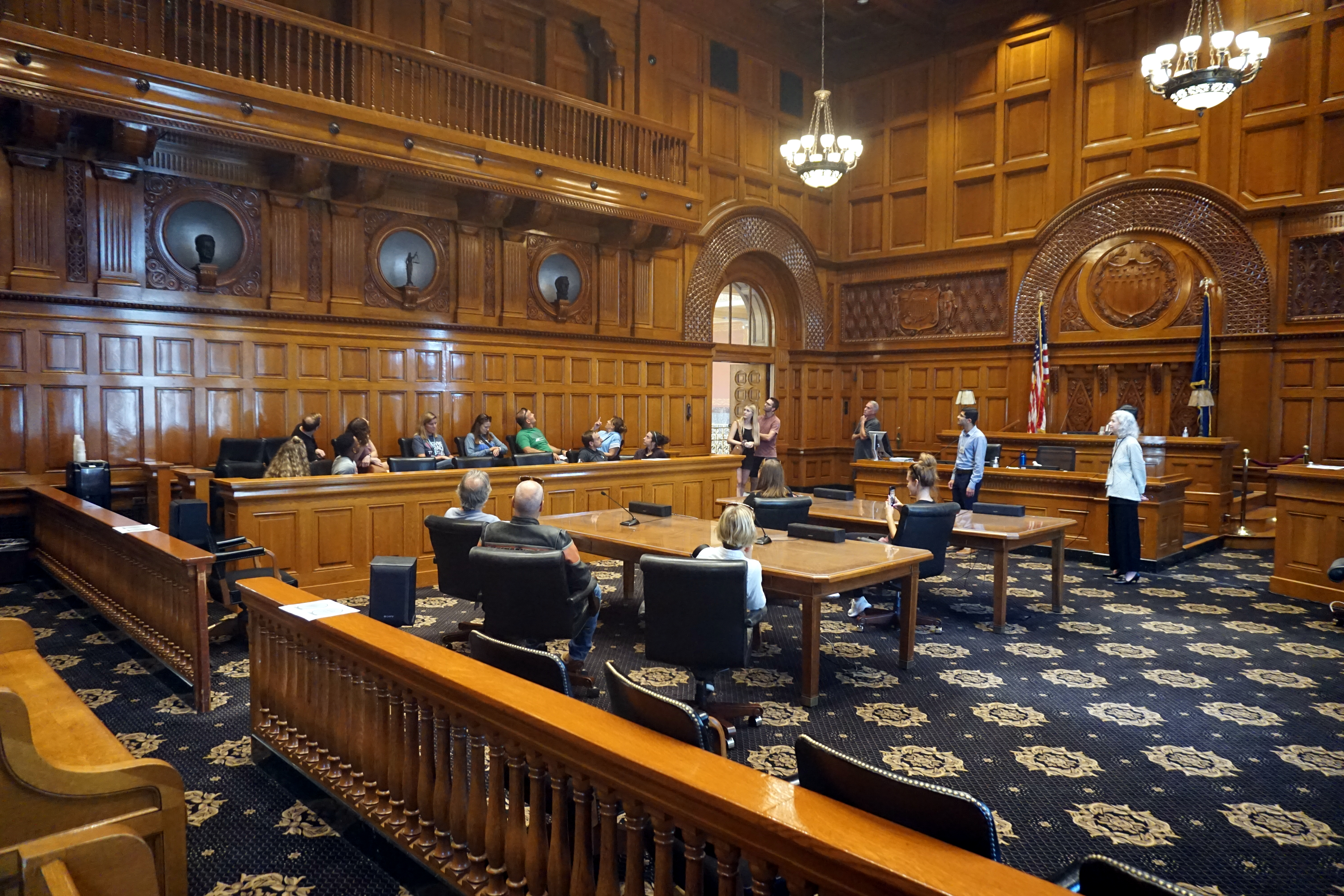
Courtroom of Hon. Lynn Adelman in Milwaukee's Federal Building

In 1997, Adelman chose to apply for appointment as U.S. district judge in the Eastern District of Wisconsin to fill the vacancy created when district judge Thomas John Curran took senior status at the beginning of that year. He was one of nineteen applicants, which included nine other state judges, two U.S. magistrate judges, and prominent state attorneys, including Maxine Aldridge White, Joan F. Kessler, and the then-chairman of the Democratic Party of Wisconsin Mark Sostarich. Adelman's application rose above the others as state Republicans embraced his candidacy and Republican then-governor Tommy Thompson wrote a glowing recommendation, describing Adelman as "thoughtful, fair, and open-minded." Newspapers at the time speculated that Republican praise for Adelman was at least partly motivated by their desire to flip his seat in a special election and thereby regain the majority in the state Senate.

Adelman was nominated to the seat by President Clinton on September 8, 1997. He received a hearing by the U.S. Senate Judiciary Committee on October 29, 1997. He was confirmed by the full United States Senate by voice vote on November 13, 1997, and received his commission on December 23, 1997.

=== Notable cases ===
==== Frank, et al vs Walker ====
The Wisconsin Voter ID law was a law passed by then Wisconsin governor Scott Walker in 2011. This law made voters of Wisconsin show a state-issued photo ID at the polls before they could vote. The reasoning behind this law was that Scott Walker wanted to stop the voter fraud that was allegedly happening within the state of Wisconsin. Adelman ruled, on April 29, 2014, that this law violated the fourteenth amendment and thus the law was unconstitutional. Adelman made this ruling because in the trial he saw no evidence of voter fraud and concluded that the law was unfair to minority voters because "Blacks and Latinos are more likely than whites to lack an ID".

Adelman was overturned on appeal with the Appeals Court offering a particularly stunning rebuke:

“the district judge found as a fact that the majority of the Supreme Court was wrong about benefits such as better record keeping and promoting public confidence. Maybe that testimony will eventually persuade the Justices themselves, but in our hierarchical judicial system a district court cannot declare a statute unconstitutional just because he thinks (with or without the support of a political scientist) that the dissent was right and the majority wrong.” [Frank v. Walker, 768 F.3d 744, 750 (7th Cir. 2014)] The Panel continued: “The district judge heard from one political scientist, whose view may or may not be representative of the profession's. After a majority of the Supreme Court has concluded that photo ID requirements promote confidence, a single district judge cannot say as a “fact” that they do not, even if 20 political scientists disagree with the Supreme Court.” [ Frank v. Walker, 768 F.3d 744, 750 (7th Cir. 2014)]

==== Johnny Kimble vs Wisconsin's Department of Workforce Development, et al. ====
In this case Johnny Kimble sued former Equal Rights Division Secretary Sheehan Donoghue for not giving him a pay raise based on his race and gender. The Equal Rights Division job is to investigate discrimination claims and to judge whether the claim of discrimination is true. Johnny Kimble is an ex employee of the Equal Rights Division and ran the office in Milwaukee. Sheehan Donoghue was appointed to this position in 1991 by then governor of Wisconsin Tommy Thompson. Adelman's ruling on this case was that Johnny Kimble was denied pay raises because of his race and that the Department of Workforce Development was to pay Johnny Kimble what he lost. This ruling was made on February 25, 2010. Adelman said that Sheehan Donoghue made statements that contradicted to what she said and what other witnesses said, she also got defensive and evasive during the questioning, and the evidence on the case did not support her claims. The evidence they found was when the Milwaukee office did well she credited the office, not Johnny, but when the Madison office did well she credited the section chief, who was white. Also, whenever Johnny said they need technical support she ignored him, but when it was a white employee, she promised help.

==== St. Augustine School v. Evers ====
In June 2017, Adelman found that Tony Evers, then Superintendent of Public Instruction of Wisconsin, did not violate the Constitution's Free Exercise Clause nor its Establishment Clause when he denied bussing to an independent Catholic school because there was a nearby archdiocesan school. In his opinion, Adelman referenced Wikipedia articles on Traditionalist Catholic and Montessori education. His judgment was affirmed by a divided panel of the United States Court of Appeals for the Seventh Circuit in October 2018.

==== United States vs. Sujata Sachdeva ====
In this trial, Koss Corporation's Chief Financial Advisor Sujata Sachdeva was charged with embezzling $34 million from the company. The other person involved in the embezzlement was Julie Mulvaney who was a senior accountant at Koss Corporation. The Koss Corporation is a manufacturer of headphones. Sachdeva used almost all of the $34 million she embezzled, from the Koss Corporation, to go on a wild shopping spree. The shopping spree consisted of shopping at designer, jewelry, department stores, and other high-end retailers. Sachdeva, along with Mulvaney, tried to cover up the embezzlement by creating false accounting records. Mulvaney created falsified journal records to cover Sachdeva's spending spree. Sachdeva's attorney's argued that Sachdeva was mentally ill with alcoholism, diagnosed bipolar disorder, and a shopping addiction, when she went on the shopping spree. The sentence the federal prosecutor wanted was 15–20 years in prison, and the lawyers for Sachdeva wanted the sentenced reduce to 6–7 years in prison, because of her mental condition. Adelman sentenced Sachdeva to 11 years in federal prison on November 17, 2010. Adelman gave some leniency to Sachdeva because of her cooperation with the FBI.

==== United States vs. William White ====
William White, a Neo-Nazi who ran the Virginia-based American Nationalist Socialist Workers Party, posted the address, name, and telephone numbers of a juror in Chicago who convicted a white supremacist to his website. The prosecutors claimed that White did this in hopes that the juror would be harmed for the conviction of the white supremacist. Adelman at first dismissed the indictment of White, because he did not threaten or actually caused harm to the man and he obtained the information legally, and that what White did was covered over the First Amendment. This judgement by Adelman was overturned and White went on to trial and was convicted by a jury in Chicago. After this sentencing Adelman reversed it for the same reasons he dismissed the case in the first place. Then on February 20, 2013, Adelman did sentence White to three and half years in prison for soliciting violence to a juror. When this sentencing happened, White was already in jail for other threats and intimidation practices.

==== United States vs. Hannah Dugan ====
In April 2025, federal agents arrested Wisconsin circuit court judge Hannah Dugan and charged her with obstructing a federal proceeding and concealing a person from arrest. The situation arose from the case of Eduardo Flores-Ruiz, an undocumented immigrant who was appearing in Dugan's courtroom as a defendant. After being informed that federal agents were waiting outside the main courtroom entrance to detain Flores-Ruiz for deportation, Dugan allowed him to leave out of an alternate door. Dugan was indicted on May 13, and the case was randomly assigned to Adelman. The case received a rush of national attention as Democrats and legal experts denounced the arrest as an assault on the independence of the judiciary and an attempt by the Donald Trump administration to intimidate political opponents.

Dugan's attorneys moved to dismiss the case on the basis of judicial immunity, official acts, and the Tenth Amendment. They wrote "The government's prosecution of Judge Dugan is virtually unprecedented and entirely unconstitutional". On August 26, 2025 Adelman ruled against Dugan, stating "There is no basis for granting immunity simply because some of the allegations in the indictment describe conduct that could be considered 'part of a judge's job'" and that Dugan "went well beyond her judicial role." After Dugan was convicted by the jury, Adelman denied her motions for acquittal and/or a new trial. On June 16, 2026, Adelman upheld the 2025 obstruction of justice verdict, declining the appeal of Dugan's 2025 felony conviction. On July 8, 2026, Adelman ordered Dugan to pay a fine of $5000 and declined to sentence her to serve any time in prison.

==== Federal lawsuits against Joseph Mensah ====
Adelman has presided over three separate civil trial lawsuits against former Milwaukee Police Department officer Joseph Mensah involving three people who Mensah shot to death, including Estate Of Antonio Gonzalez v. Joseph Anthony Mensah et al., Estate of Jay Anderson Jr., et al v. Joseph Anthony Mensah et al., and Estate of Alvin Cole et al. v. Joseph Anthony Mensah et al. All three lawsuits against Mensah were initially filed in 2021 and 2022, each of which alleged that Mensah used excessive force and that the Milwaukee Police Department promoted racism, and were then consolidated in September 2022. As of September 2025, Adelman has dismissed the lawsuits against Mensah of the deaths of Gonzalez and Anderson, but has allowed the lawsuit against Mensah for the death of Cole to continue. On September 11, 2025 the same day a second mistrial was ruled in Cole's case due to a hung jury, Adelman scheduled for a third civil trial against Mensah for Cole's death to start on May 4, 2026. On April 28, 2026, a third civil trial against Mensah over Cole's death would be avoided, with Cole's family in the process of finalizing an agreed settlement.

=== Criticism of the Supreme Court under John Roberts ===
In February 2020, Adelman wrote an article criticizing the recent record of the Supreme Court of the United States under Chief Justice John Roberts The article singled out Chief Justice Roberts and accused him of actively participating in "undermining American democracy," through activist decisions on voting rights and campaign finance by corporate interests. Adelman wrote, "Instead of doing what it can to ensure the maintenance of a robust democratic republic, the Court's decisions ally it with the most anti-democratic currents in American politics, forces that would be pleased if unlimited money could be spent on elections and if minorities could be deterred from voting."

The article specifically cited a number of partisan 5–4 decisions, such as Shelby County v. Holder, (which struck down part of the Voting Rights Act of 1965), Rucho v. Common Cause, (which decided that federal courts could not rule on cases of gerrymandering), Citizens United v. FEC, (which allowed unlimited corporate spending on elections), and Janus v. AFSCME (which held that it was unconstitutional for public employee unions to require collective bargaining fees). The article created waves in legal circles because of the unusually blunt criticism of the Court coming from a sitting federal judge. Legal scholar Jonathan Turley argued that the article makes "a better case of bias against himself than he does Chief Justice John Roberts" and noted previous articles where Adelman had also directly criticized conservatives while serving as a federal judge. The Judicial Council for the Seventh Circuit censured Judge Adelman for writing this article.

=== Consideration for Seventh Circuit ===
On January 22, 2010, United States Senators Herb Kohl and Russ Feingold forwarded four names to the Obama White House for consideration to fill the vacancy on the United States Court of Appeals for the Seventh Circuit created when Judge Terence T. Evans assumed senior status. Adelman was recommended along with Victoria F. Nourse, Richard Sankovitz and Dean Strang, but was not selected for the spot.

== Personal life and family ==
Lynn Adelman is the eldest of three sons born to Albert Adelman and his wife Edith (née Margoles) Adelman. Albert Adelman was a successful businessman in Milwaukee, and became a prominent member of the Milwaukee Jewish community, serving as national chairman of United Jewish Appeal, Wisconsin chairman of Israel Bonds, and president of the Milwaukee Jewish Federation. The Albert and Edith Adelman House in Fox Point, Wisconsin, was designed by Frank Lloyd Wright and is listed in the National Register of Historic Places.

Lynn Adelman married Elizabeth "Betty" Halmbacher on April 23, 1976, at Corrales, New Mexico. Through the marriage, Adelman became stepfather to Betty's two daughters from her previous marriage.

== Electoral history ==
=== U.S. House of Representatives (1974) ===
Wisconsin's Ninth Congressional District Election, 1974
Party	Candidate	Votes	%	±%
Primary Election, September 10, 1974
Republican	Robert W. Kasten Jr.	22,749	31.59%	
Democratic	Lynn Adelman	18,201	25.27%	
Republican	Glenn Robert Davis (incumbent)	17,054	23.68%	
Democratic	G. Sam Davis	12,000	16.66%	
American	William D. Quirk	77	0.11%	
Total votes		72,014	100.0%	
General Election, November 5, 1974
Republican	Robert W. Kasten Jr.	77,733	52.25%	−8.59%
Democratic	Lynn Adelman	66,071	44.41%	+8.07%
American	William D. Quirk	3,037	2.04%	+0.13%
Total votes		148,774	100.0%	-29.41%
Republican hold				

=== Wisconsin Senate (1976–1996) ===
Wisconsin Senate, 28th District Election, 1976
Party	Candidate	Votes	%	±%
General Election, November 2, 1976
Democratic	Lynn Adelman	45,439	66.24%	
Republican	James C. Devitt (incumbent)	23,158	33.76%	
Total votes		68,597	100.0%	
Democratic gain from Republican				

Wisconsin Senate, 28th District Election, 1980
Party	Candidate	Votes	%	±%
General Election, November 4, 1980
Democratic	Lynn Adelman (incumbent)	44,330	54.65%	−11.59%
Republican	Joseph E. Wimmer	36,786	45.35%	
Total votes		81,116	100.0%	+18.25%
Democratic hold				

Wisconsin Senate, 28th District Election, 1984
Party	Candidate	Votes	%	±%
General Election, November 6, 1984
Democratic	Lynn Adelman (incumbent)	41,690	64.85%	+10.20%
Republican	Raymond J. Gray	22,596	35.15%	
Total votes		64,286	100.0%	-20.75%
Democratic hold				

=== U.S. House of Representatives (1982, 1984) ===
Wisconsin's Fourth Congressional District Election, 1982
Party	Candidate	Votes	%	±%
Primary Election, September 14, 1982
Democratic	Clement J. Zablocki (incumbent)	56,047	60.60%	
Democratic	Lynn Adelman	36,102	39.04%	
Libertarian	Nicholas P. Youngers	223	0.24%	
Constitution	John Gudenschwager	111	0.12%	
Total votes		92,483	100.0%	
General Election, November 2, 1982
Democratic	Clement J. Zablocki (incumbent)	129,557	94.58%	
Libertarian	Nicholas P. Youngers	4,064	2.97%	
Constitution	John Gudenschwager	946	0.69%	
Independent	John F. Baumgartner	2,421	1.77%	
Total votes		136,988	100.0%	
Democratic hold				

Wisconsin's Fourth Congressional District Special Election, 1984
Party	Candidate	Votes	%	±%
Primary Election, February 21, 1984
Democratic	Gerald D. Kleczka	33,384	28.91%	
Democratic	E. Michael McCann	27,614	23.91%	
Democratic	Lynn Adelman	27,279	23.62%	
Democratic	Gary J. Barczak	15,827	13.70%	
Republican	Robert V. Nolan	7,742	6.70%	
Democratic	James Paul Buckley	1,149	0.99%	
Democratic	Roman R. Blenski	859	0.74%	
Republican	John F. Baumgartner	717	0.62%	
Republican	Ray Derringer	598	0.52%	
Republican	Joseph A. Ortiz	316	0.27%	
Total votes		115,485	100.0%	
General Election, April 3, 1984
Democratic	Gerald D. Kleczka	76,384	65.07%	
Republican	Robert V. Nolan	41,007	34.93%	
Total votes		117,391	100.0%	
Democratic hold				

== See also ==
- List of Jewish American jurists

Wisconsin Senate
Preceded by James Devitt	Member of the Wisconsin Senate from the 28th district 1977–1997	Succeeded by Mary Lazich
Legal offices
Preceded by Thomas John Curran	Judge of the United States District Court for the Eastern District of Wisconsin; 1997–present	Incumbent
