= 1965 Wisconsin Supreme Court election =

- April 6, 1965

Candidate	Nathan Heffernan	Howard H. Boyle Jr.
Popular vote	376,183	362,604
Percentage	50.92%	49.08%
- Heffernan: 50–60% 60–70% 70–80% Boyle: 50–60% 60–70% 70–80%
Justice before election
Nathan Heffernan
Elected Justice
Nathan Heffernan

The 1965 Wisconsin Supreme Court election was held on Tuesday, April 6, 1965, to elect a justice to the Wisconsin Supreme Court for a ten-year term. In the election, which saw low turnout, incumbent justice Nathan Heffernan (who had been appointed the previous year to fill a vacancy) narrowly defeated challenger Howard H. Boyle Jr.

== Background ==
In 1964, Heffernan was appointed by Governor John W. Reynolds Jr. to fill the vacancy on the court created by the death of then-incumbent justice William H. Dieterich. The 1965 election was the first election Heffernan faced to retain his seat. The vacancy resulted in an early election for the seat in 1965. In accordance with the specifications of the state constitution, the 1965 election was to contest a fresh ten-year full term (as opposed to a special election to only a partial unexpired term).

In October 1964, Heffernan sided with the majority in the Barnes v. State ruling in which the court set aside a known drug user's conviction for possession of marijuana after finding that the marijuana had been discovered by an search conducted on unreasonable grounds (rendering it fruit of the poisonous tree by virtue of the Fourth Amendment to the United States Constitution). While this ruling generated little media attention or public reaction, it would become a key topic of the 1965 judicial election.

The previous year, attorney Howard H. Boyle Jr. had challenged incumbent justice Horace W. Wilkie. Wilkie prevailed by a narrower-than-expected margin after Boyle ran a campaign centered on criticizing Wilkie as promoting "smut" due to siding in the majority in the early-1964 McCauley v. Tropic of Cancer decision, in which the court held that the novel Tropic of Cancer by Henry Miller was not legally obscene. The outcome of this case was unpopular with the public.

== Candidates ==
- Nathan Heffernan, incumbent justice since 1964 (appointed by governor)
- Howard H. Boyle Jr., Beaver Dam-based attorney; runner-up in the 1964 Supreme Court election; candidate U.S. senate candidate in 1956 and 1957.

== Campaign ==
Boyle centered his campaign by assailing the court's current composition for having what he characterized as an "ultraliberal" ideological lean. He pointed primarily to the Barnes ruling, and secondarily to the earlier Tropic of Cancer ruling. However, while the Tropic of Thunder ruling had received great attention and generated broad negative public sentiment that benefited Boyle's 1964 campaign, the Barnes ruling had gone largely unnoticed by the media and failed to attract the same vigorous public outrage. While the result of the election would be close, its low turnout indicated that (unlike 1964) there was not a strong sentiment motivating voters.

== Results ==
The voter turnout of the election was regarded to be very low.

1965 Wisconsin Supreme Court election
Party	Candidate	Votes	%
General election (April 6, 1965)
Nonpartisan	Nathan S. Heffernan (incumbent)	376,183	50.92
Nonpartisan	Howard H. Boyle Jr.	362,604	49.08
Total votes		738,787	100
