= Grover L. Broadfoot =

American politician and judge

The Honorable Grover L. Broadfoot
- Portrait as a justice

17th Chief Justice of the Wisconsin Supreme Court
- In office January 1, 1962 – May 18, 1962
- Preceded by: John E. Martin
- Succeeded by: Timothy Brown

Justice of the Wisconsin Supreme Court
- In office November 12, 1948 – May 18, 1962
- Appointed by: Oscar Rennebohm
- Preceded by: Elmer E. Barlow
- Succeeded by: Horace W. Wilkie

30th Attorney General of Wisconsin
- In office June 5, 1948 – November 12, 1948
- Appointed by: Oscar Rennebohm
- Preceded by: John E. Martin
- Succeeded by: Thomas E. Fairchild

Member of the Wisconsin State Assembly from the Buffalo and Pepin district
- In office January 1, 1945 – June 5, 1948
- Preceded by: David I. Hammergren
- Succeeded by: Edmund Hitt

Mayor of Mondovi, Wisconsin
- In office April 1943 – April 1947

District Attorney of Buffalo County
- In office January 1, 1923 – January 1, 1935
- Preceded by: Peter H. Urness
- Succeeded by: Peter H. Urness

Personal details
- Born: Grover Lee Broadfoot; December 27, 1892 Independence, Wisconsin, U.S.
- Died: May 18, 1962 (aged 69) Minneapolis, Minnesota, U.S.
- Resting place: Oak Park Cemetery; Mondovi, Wisconsin
- Party: Republican
- Spouses: Margaret Marion Jacobi; (m. 1925; died 1961)
- Children: John Alexander Broadfoot
- Parents: Alexander Broadfoot (father); Celia Eliza (Tillotson) Broadfoot (mother)
- Education: University of Wisconsin

Military service
- Allegiance: United States
- Branch/service: United States Army
- Years of service: 1918
- Battles/wars: World War I

Grover Lee Broadfoot (December 27, 1892 – May 18, 1962) was an American lawyer and judge from Wisconsin. He was a justice of the Wisconsin Supreme Court for thirteen years and was briefly Chief Justice for the last 5 months of his life. Earlier in his career, he had been the 30th Attorney General of Wisconsin, a member of the Wisconsin State Assembly, Mayor of Mondovi, Wisconsin, and District Attorney of Buffalo County for twelve years.

== Biography ==
Born in Independence, Wisconsin, Broadfoot moved with his family to Mondovi, Wisconsin, where he graduated from high school. Broadfoot graduated from the University of Wisconsin, where he also received his law degree in 1918, and then enlisted in the army during World War I. Later he was the district attorney of Buffalo County, Wisconsin and was mayor of Mondovi, Wisconsin from 1943 to 1947. In 1947 he served in the Wisconsin State Assembly until June 5, 1948, when he resigned to become Attorney General of Wisconsin. He then resigned on November 12, 1948, when he was appointed to the Wisconsin Supreme Court. In 1962 he became chief justice, serving until his death. He died of a heart ailment in Minneapolis.

== Notes ==
Legal offices
Preceded by John E. Martin	Attorney General of Wisconsin; 1948	Succeeded by Thomas E. Fairchild
Preceded by Elmer E. Barlow	Justice of the Wisconsin Supreme Court; 1948 – 1962	Succeeded by Horace W. Wilkie
Preceded by John E. Martin	Chief Justice of the Wisconsin Supreme Court; 1962	Succeeded by Timothy Brown
