= 1951 Wisconsin Supreme Court election =

- April 3, 1950
Candidate	John E. Martin
Popular vote	515,599
Percentage	100%
Justice before election
John E. Martin
Elected Justice
John E. Martin

The 1951 Wisconsin Supreme Court election was held on Tuesday, April 3, 1951, to elect a justice to a full ten-year seat the Wisconsin Supreme Court. Incumbent justice John E. Martin won re-election, unopposed.

== Results ==
1951 Wisconsin Supreme Court election
Party	Candidate	Votes	%	±%
Nonpartisan	John E. Martin (incumbent)	515,599	100	
Total votes		515,599	100	
