= 1950 Wisconsin Supreme Court special election =

- April 4, 1950

Candidate	John E. Martin	Marshall Peterson
Popular vote	300,476	209,720
Percentage	58.89%	41.11%
Justice before election
John E. Martin
Elected Justice
John E. Martin

newspaper advertisement for Peterson's campaign

The 1950 Wisconsin Supreme Court special election was a special election held on Tuesday, April 4, 1950, to elect a justice to the Wisconsin Supreme Court. Incumbent justice John E. Martin (appointed in 1948 to fill the vacancy created by the death on the bench of Chester A. Fowler) won election, defeating challenger Marshall Peterson.

== Candidates ==
- John E. Martin, incumbent justice
- Marshall L. Peterson, lawyer, former Green County judge (1938–43), former assistant district attorney of Green County, former public administrator, U.S. Navy veteran of World War II, candidate for Supreme Court in 1949

== Results ==
1950 Wisconsin Supreme Court special election
Party	Candidate	Votes	%
Nonpartisan	John E. Martin (incumbent)	300,476	58.89
Nonpartisan	Marshall Peterson	209,720	41.11
Total votes		510,196	100
