= Raymond C. Johnson =

American politician

Johnson, circa 1970

Raymond C. Johnson (August 20, 1936 - October 8, 1979) was a member of the Wisconsin State Senate.

== Biography ==
Johnson was born on August 20, 1936. He would graduate from what is now the University of Wisconsin-Eau Claire and George Washington University and serve in the United States Navy.

== Political career ==
Johnson was first elected to the Senate in 1966. Later, he would become Majority Leader. He was a Republican.

Whilst majority leader, Johnson was an unsuccessful candidate for the Wisconsin Supreme Court in 1974, challenging incumbent justice Horace W. Wilkie.
