= 2009 Wisconsin Supreme Court election =

- April 7, 2009
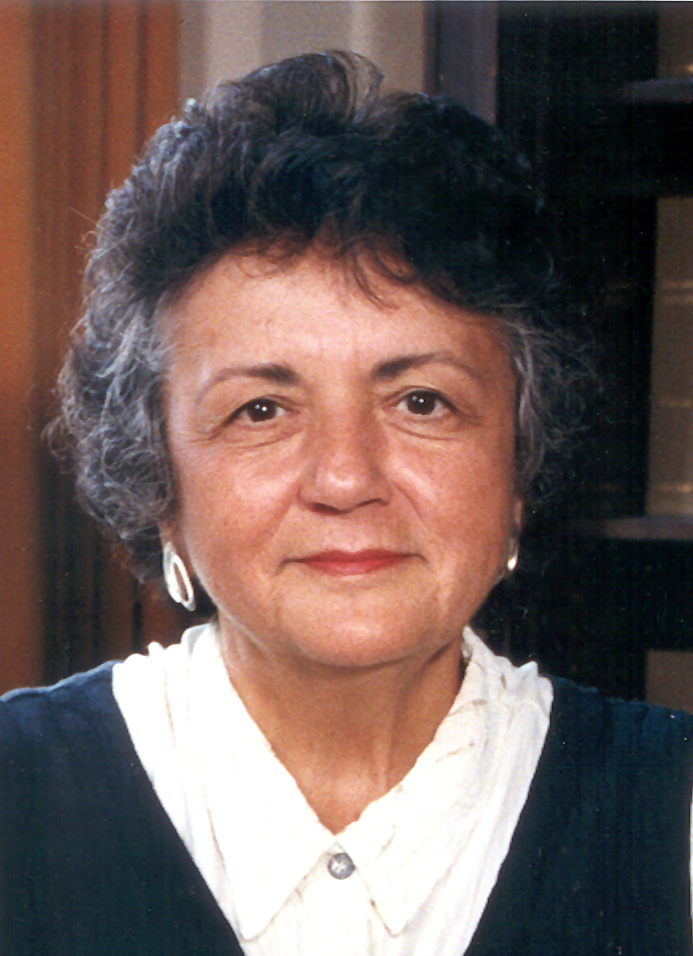

Candidate	Shirley Abrahamson	Randy Koschnick
Popular vote	473,712	319,706
Percentage	59.67%	40.27%
- County results Abrahamson: 50–60% 60–70% 70–90% Koschnick: 50–60%
Justice before election
Shirley Abrahamson
Elected Justice
Shirley Abrahamson

A regularly scheduled Wisconsin Supreme Court election was held as part of the Wisconsin Spring general election on April 7, 2009. Incumbent chief justice Shirley Abrahamson, first appointed by Governor Patrick Lucey in 1976, won her fourth ten-year term—the most Wisconsin Supreme Court elections won by any person. She defeated Jefferson County circuit judge Randy R. Koschnick, taking 59.67% of the general election vote.

== Candidates ==
- Shirley S. Abrahamson, incumbent justice
- Randy R. Koschnick, Jefferson County Circuit Court judge

== Campaign ==
Heading into the election, the court had a conservative ideological majority (4 conservatives, 2 liberals, and 1 centrist). Abrahmson's ideology placed her firmly in the court's liberal minority, while her challenger, Koschnick, was a conservative.

Abrahamson's advanced age (75 years old at the time of the election) was characterized as being an "unspoken issue" of the election.

While a candidate, Koschnick spoke supportively of the proposal for Wisconsin to adopt public financing of campaigns. However, he later filed a lawsuit seeking to challenge a public financing law that Governor Jim Doyle signed in December 2009.

== Results ==
2009 Wisconsin Supreme Court election
Party	Candidate	Votes	%	±%
General election (April 7, 2009)
Nonpartisan	Shirley S. Abrahamson (incumbent)	473,712	59.67%	−3.74pp
Nonpartisan	Randy R. Koschnick	319,706	40.27%	
	Scattering	446	0.06%	
Plurality		154,006	19.40%	-7.57pp
Total votes		793,864	100.0%	+4.60%

== Aftermath ==
The term was Abrahamson's final.

In 2016, Koschnick was one of five finalists for then-governor Scott Walker to appoint to the seat left vacant by the retirement of David Prosser Jr. However, he was not appointed Koschnick would later be appointed director of the Wisconsin Court System, a role from which he was dismissed from in August 2023 –one day after the court swung to a liberal majority.

== See also ==
- 2009 Wisconsin elections
