= 1999 Wisconsin Supreme Court election =

- April 6, 1999
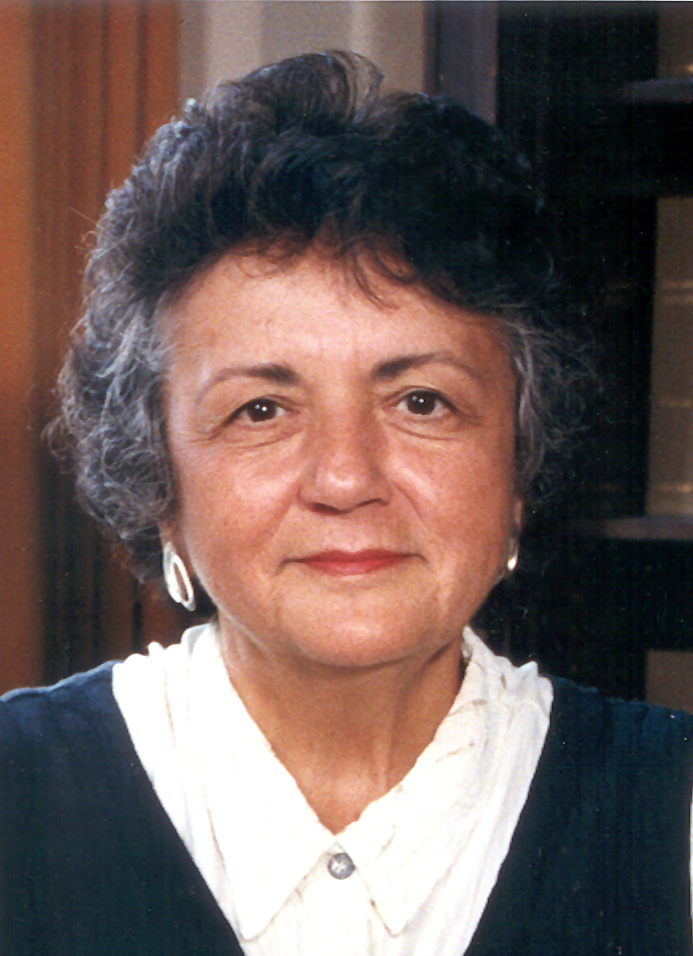

Candidate	Shirley Abrahamson	Sharren B. Rose
Popular vote	481,281	276,584
Percentage	63.41%	36.44%
- Abrahamson: 50–60% 60–70% 70–80% 80–90% Rose: 50–60%
Justice before election
Shirley Abrahamson
Elected Justice
Shirley Abrahamson

The 1999 Wisconsin Supreme Court election was held on April 6, 1999, to elect a justice to the Wisconsin Supreme Court for a ten-year term. Incumbent justice Shirley Abrahamson was re-elected over Sharren B. Rose.

== Results ==
1999 Wisconsin Supreme Court election
Party	Candidate	Votes	%
General Election, April 6, 1999
Nonpartisan	Shirley Abrahamson (incumbent)	481,281	63.41
Nonpartisan	Sharren B. Rose	276,584	36.44
	Scattering	1,100	0.14
Plurality		204,697	26.97
Total votes		758,965	100
