= 1985 Wisconsin Supreme Court election =

- April 2, 1985
Candidate	Nathan Heffernan
Popular vote	470,973
Percentage	100%
- County results Heffernan: >90%
Justice before election
Nathan Heffernan
Elected Justice
Nathan Heffernan

The 1985 Wisconsin Supreme Court election was held on April 2, 1985, to elect a justice to the Wisconsin Supreme Court for a ten-year term. Incumbent justice Nathan Heffernan (who had held the seat since 1964) was re-elected.

1985 Wisconsin Supreme Court election
Party	Candidate	Votes	%	±%
General election (April 2, 1985)
Nonpartisan	Nathan Heffernan (incumbent)	470,973	100%	
Total votes		470,973	100%	
