= Thomas John Curran =

American judge (1924–2012)

Senior Judge of the United States District Court for the Eastern District of Wisconsin
- In office January 1, 1997 – July 17, 2012

Judge of the United States District Court for the Eastern District of Wisconsin
- In office November 7, 1983 – January 1, 1997
- Appointed by: Ronald Reagan
- Preceded by: Myron L. Gordon
- Succeeded by: Lynn Adelman

Personal details
- Born: Thomas John Curran; April 30, 1924 Mauston, Wisconsin, U.S.
- Died: July 17, 2012 (aged 88) Mauston, Wisconsin, U.S.
- Education: Marquette University (B.N.S.); Marquette University Law School (LL.B.)

Thomas John Curran (April 30, 1924 – July 17, 2012) was a United States district judge of the United States District Court for the Eastern District of Wisconsin.

== Education and career ==
Born in Mauston, Wisconsin, Curran was in the United States Navy during World War II, from 1943 to 1946. He received a Bachelor in Naval Science degree from Marquette University in 1945 and a Bachelor of Laws from Marquette University Law School in 1948. He was in private practice in Mauston from 1948 to 1983.

== Federal judicial service ==
On September 20, 1983, Curran was nominated by President Ronald Reagan to a seat on the United States District Court for the Eastern District of Wisconsin vacated by Judge Myron L. Gordon. Curran was confirmed by the United States Senate on November 4, 1983, and received his commission on November 7, 1983. He assumed senior status on January 1, 1997, serving in that status until his death in Mauston on July 17, 2012.

== Sources ==
Legal offices
Preceded by Myron L. Gordon	Judge of the United States District Court for the Eastern District of Wisconsin; 1983–1997	Succeeded by Lynn Adelman
