= Myron L. Gordon =

20th century American judge

- portrait of Gordon, circa 1961

Senior Judge of the United States District Court for the Eastern District of Wisconsin
- In office February 12, 1983 – November 3, 2009

Judge of the United States District Court for the Eastern District of Wisconsin
- In office March 4, 1967 – February 12, 1983
- Appointed by: Lyndon B. Johnson
- Preceded by: Seat established by 80 Stat. 75
- Succeeded by: Thomas John Curran

Justice of the Wisconsin Supreme Court
- In office January 1, 1962 – March 4, 1967
- Preceded by: John E. Martin
- Succeeded by: Connor Hansen

Wisconsin Circuit Court Judge for the 2nd Circuit, Branch 3
- In office January 4, 1955 – January 1, 1962
- Preceded by: Elmer W. Roller
- Succeeded by: John A. Decker

Personal details
- Born: February 11, 1918 Kenosha, Wisconsin, U.S.
- Died: November 3, 2009 (aged 91) Palm Desert, California, U.S.
- Spouses: Ruth Peggy Siesel (m. 1942; died 1973); Myra
- Children: 3
- Education: University of Wisconsin (BA, MA); Harvard University (LLB)
- Profession: Lawyer, judge

Myron L. Gordon (February 11, 1918 – November 3, 2009) was an American lawyer and jurist from Kenosha, Wisconsin. He was a United States district judge for the Eastern District of Wisconsin, serving from 1967 until taking senior status in 1983. He previously served five years as a justice of the Wisconsin Supreme Court, and was a Wisconsin circuit court judge for seven years in Milwaukee County.

== Education and career ==
Portrait of Gordon as a justice

Born in Kenosha, Wisconsin, Gordon received a Bachelor of Arts degree from the University of Wisconsin in 1939 and a Master of Arts degree from the same institution in 1939. He received a Bachelor of Laws from Harvard Law School in 1942. He was Lieutenant in the United States Naval Reserve from 1944 to 1946. He was in private practice in Milwaukee from 1945 to 1950. He was a civil court judge in Milwaukee County from 1950 to 1954. He ran unsuccessfully for a Wisconsin circuit court judgeship in 1953, losing to Leo B. Hanley. He ran again the following year, and this time defeated incumbent judge Elmer W. Roller. He served a full six-year term as circuit judge and was re-elected in 1960.

In 1961, he sought election to the Wisconsin Supreme Court in the seat being vacated by the retirement of chief justice John E. Martin. Gordon survived the nonpartisan primary in March 1961, and went on to face former state attorney general Stewart G. Honeck in the general election. Gordon prevailed with 52% of the vote in the April general election.

=== Federal judicial service ===
Gordon was nominated by President Lyndon B. Johnson on January 16, 1967, to the United States District Court for the Eastern District of Wisconsin, to a new seat created by 80 Stat. 75. He was confirmed by the United States Senate on March 2, 1967, and received his commission on March 4, 1967. He assumed senior status on February 12, 1983. He served in that status until his death on November 3, 2009, in Palm Desert, California.

== Personal life and family ==
Myron Gordon was a son of Jewish immigrants Samuel R. and Janet (née Ruppa) Gordon. His father was born in Poland and his mother was born in Russia. Myron had one older brother, Norvan, who was a medical doctor in Milwaukee County.

Myron Gordon married Ruth Peggy Siesel on August 16, 1942. They had three children together before her death from post-surgical complications in 1973. Gordon subsequently remarried, and was survived by his second wife, Myra.

== Electoral history ==
=== Wisconsin Circuit Court (1953) ===
Wisconsin Circuit Courts, 2nd Circuit, Branch 1 Election, 1953
Party	Candidate	Votes	%	±%
General Election, April 7, 1953
Nonpartisan	Leo B. Hanley	105,303	51.41%	
Nonpartisan	Myron L. Gordon	99,546	48.59%	
Plurality		5,757	2.81%	
Total votes		204,849	100.0%	

=== Wisconsin Circuit Court (1954, 1960) ===
Wisconsin Circuit Courts, 2nd Circuit, Branch 3 Election, 1954
Party	Candidate	Votes	%	±%
General Election, April 6, 1954
Nonpartisan	Myron L. Gordon	98,900	63.91%	
Nonpartisan	Elmer W. Roller (incumbent)	55,837	36.09%	
Plurality		43,063	27.83%	
Total votes		154,737	100.0%	

Wisconsin Circuit Courts, 2nd Circuit, Branch 3 Election, 1960
Party	Candidate	Votes	%	±%
General Election, April 5, 1960
Nonpartisan	Myron L. Gordon	246,695	100.0%	
Total votes		246,695	100.0%	

=== Wisconsin Supreme Court (1961) ===
1961 Wisconsin Supreme Court election
Party	Candidate	Votes	%	±%
Nonpartisan Primary, March 7, 1961
Nonpartisan	Stewart G. Honeck	177,890	51.21%	
Nonpartisan	Myron L. Gordon	145,270	41.82%	
Nonpartisan	Christ Alexopoulos	24,230	6.97%	
Total votes		347,390	100.0%	
General Election, April 4, 1961
Nonpartisan	Myron L. Gordon	399,408	52.16%	
Nonpartisan	Stewart G. Honeck	366,390	47.84%	
Plurality		33,018	4.31%	
Total votes		765,798	100.0%	

== Sources ==
Legal offices
Preceded by Elmer W. Roller	Wisconsin Circuit Court Judge for the 2nd Circuit, Branch 3 January 4, 1955 – January 1, 1962	Succeeded by John A. Decker
Preceded by John E. Martin	Justice of the Wisconsin Supreme Court; January 1, 1962 – March 4, 1967	Succeeded by Connor Hansen
Seat established by 80 Stat. 75	United States District Judge for the Eastern District of Wisconsin; March 4, 1967 – February 12, 1983	Succeeded by Thomas John Curran
