= 1986 Wisconsin Supreme Court election =

- April 1, 1986
Candidate	Roland B. Day
Popular vote	461,118
Percentage	unopposed
Justice before election
Roland B. Day
Elected Justice
Roland B. Day

The 1986 Wisconsin Supreme Court election was held on April 1, 1986, to elect a justice to the Wisconsin Supreme Court for a ten-year term. Incumbent justice Roland B. Day was re-elected unopposed.

== Results ==
1986 Wisconsin Supreme Court election
Party	Candidate	Votes	%	±%
General election (April 1, 1986)
Nonpartisan	Roland B. Day (incumbent)	461,118	unopposed	
	Scattering			
Total votes				
