= Roland B. Day =

American jurist and politician (1919–2008)

The Honorable Roland B. Day
- portrait photograph, as a justice

24th Chief Justice of the Wisconsin Supreme Court
- In office August 1, 1995 – July 31, 1996
- Preceded by: Nathan Heffernan
- Succeeded by: Shirley Abrahamson

Justice of the Wisconsin Supreme Court
- In office August 1, 1974 – July 31, 1996
- Appointed by: Patrick Lucey
- Preceded by: E. Harold Hallows
- Succeeded by: N. Patrick Crooks

Personal details
- Born: Roland Bernard Day; June 11, 1919 Oshkosh, Wisconsin, U.S.
- Died: July 26, 2008 (aged 89) Madison, Wisconsin, U.S.
- Resting place: Forest Hill Cemetery; Madison, Wisconsin
- Spouse: Mary Jane Purcell
- Children: 1
- Education: University of Wisconsin
- Profession: lawyer

Military service
- Allegiance: United States
- Branch/service: United States Army
- Years of service: 1942–1946
- Battles/wars: World War II

Roland Bernard Day (June 11, 1919 – July 26, 2008) was an American lawyer, politician, and jurist. He was the 24th Chief Justice of the Wisconsin Supreme Court, in 1995 and 1996, after a 22-year career on the court.

== Early life and family ==
Roland B. Day was born June 11, 1919, in Oshkosh, Wisconsin, and was raised in Eau Claire, Wisconsin. He received his bachelor's and law degrees from the University of Wisconsin in 1942 and 1947, respectively. He served overseas in the United States Army during World War II.

Day was married to Mary Jane (Purcell). They had one daughter, Sarah.

== Career ==
portrait photograph, circa 1976

Day was a law trainee in the Office of the Attorney General in 1947, and was the first assistant district attorney for Dane County from 1949 to 1952. In 1954, Day managed the Wisconsin gubernatorial campaign of William Proxmire in the Democratic primary. His chief opponent in the primary was James Edward Doyle, whose campaign was managed by Patrick Lucey. Proxmire defeated Doyle in the primary but went on to defeat in the general election.

In 1957, Proxmire won a special election to the United States Senate and named Day as his legal counsel in Washington, D.C.

Upon returning to Madison, in 1958, Day resumed his law practice until 1974. During this period, he was chair of the Madison Public Housing Authority, which during his tenure built the first public housing units in Madison; served as special counsel to Governor John W. Reynolds in the 1964 reapportionment case before the Wisconsin Supreme Court, which became the first state court in the nation to reapportion legislative districts on the basis of one person, one vote. He also represented the mayor of Madison in a civil action challenging his right to go forward with the building of the Monona Terrace and served on the Board of Regents of the University of Wisconsin System from 1972 to 1974.

== Judicial service ==
In 1974, while a partner in the law firm of Wheeler, Van Sickle, Day and Anderson, Day was appointed to the Wisconsin Supreme Court by his 1954 campaign rival, Patrick J. Lucey, who was now Governor of Wisconsin. He was elected in 1976 and was re-elected in 1986. He became the chief justice August 1, 1995, and retired a year later, at the end of his second term. Day was considered to be a member of the court's ideologically liberal wing.

While on the Supreme Court, Day was a member of the Judicial Council and the Council of Criminal Justice. From 1986 to 1991, Day served as state chair of the Wisconsin Bicentennial Committee on the United States Constitution. His name appears on a Bicentennial commemorative plaque in the capitol rotunda, along with an original copy of the Wisconsin Constitution of 1848. Day was a member of the Supreme Court's Sesquicentennial Committee.

== Electoral history ==
1976 Wisconsin Supreme Court election
Party	Candidate	Votes	%	±%
General Election, February 17, 1976
Nonpartisan	Leander J. Foley Jr.	186,688	50.48%	
Nonpartisan	Roland B. Day (incumbent)	130,006	35.15%	
Nonpartisan	Christ Alexopoulos	53,127	14.37%	
Total votes		369,821	100.0%	
General Election, April 6, 1976
Nonpartisan	Roland B. Day (incumbent)	621,885	53.22%	
Nonpartisan	Leander J. Foley Jr.	546,721	46.78%	
Total votes		1,168,606	100.0%	

1986 Wisconsin Supreme Court election
Party	Candidate	Votes	%	±%
General Election, April 1, 1986
Nonpartisan	Roland B. Day (incumbent)	461,118	100.0%	
Total votes		461,118	100.0%	

Legal offices
Preceded by E. Harold Hallows	Justice of the Wisconsin Supreme Court; 1974 – 1996	Succeeded by N. Patrick Crooks
Preceded by Nathan S. Heffernan	Chief Justice of the Wisconsin Supreme Court; 1995 – 1996	Succeeded by Shirley S. Abrahamson
