= Angelo, Wisconsin =

- Town
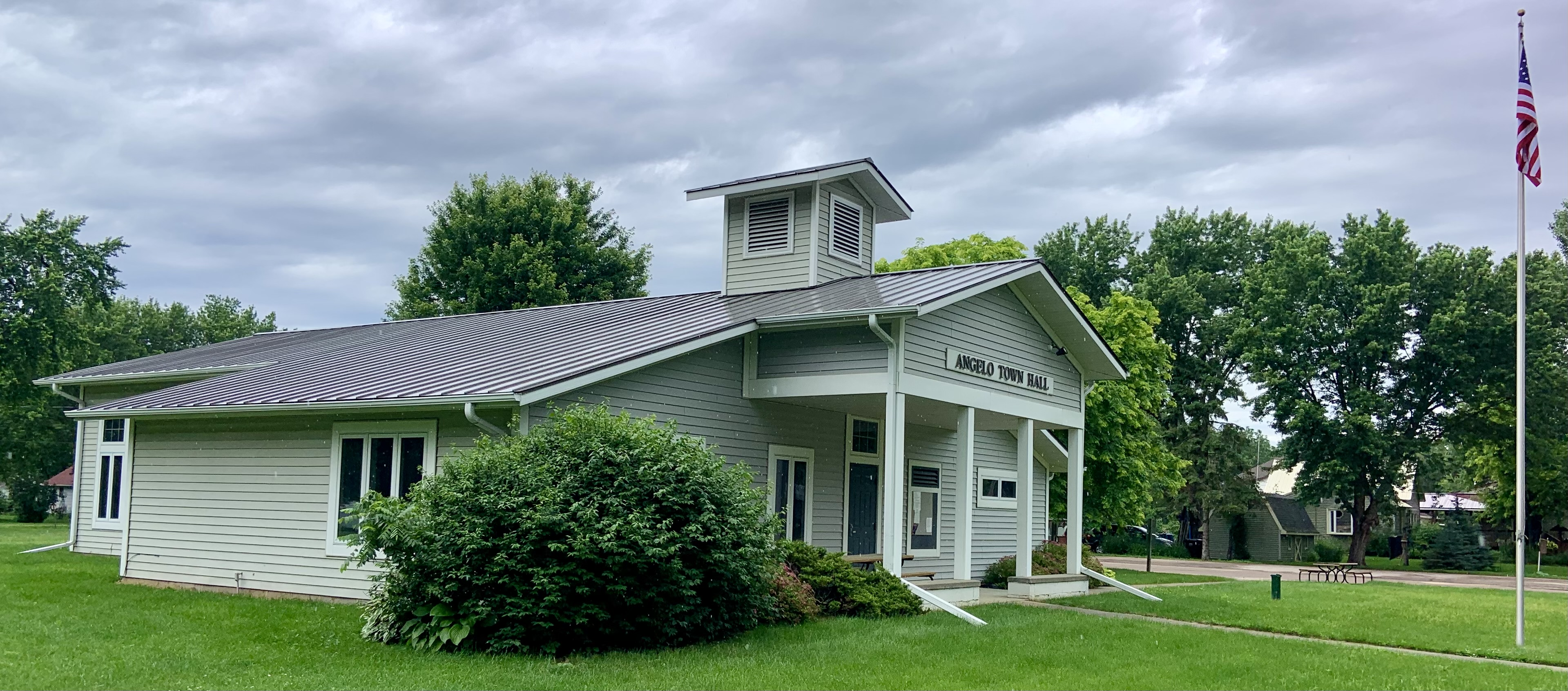
- Angelo Town Hall

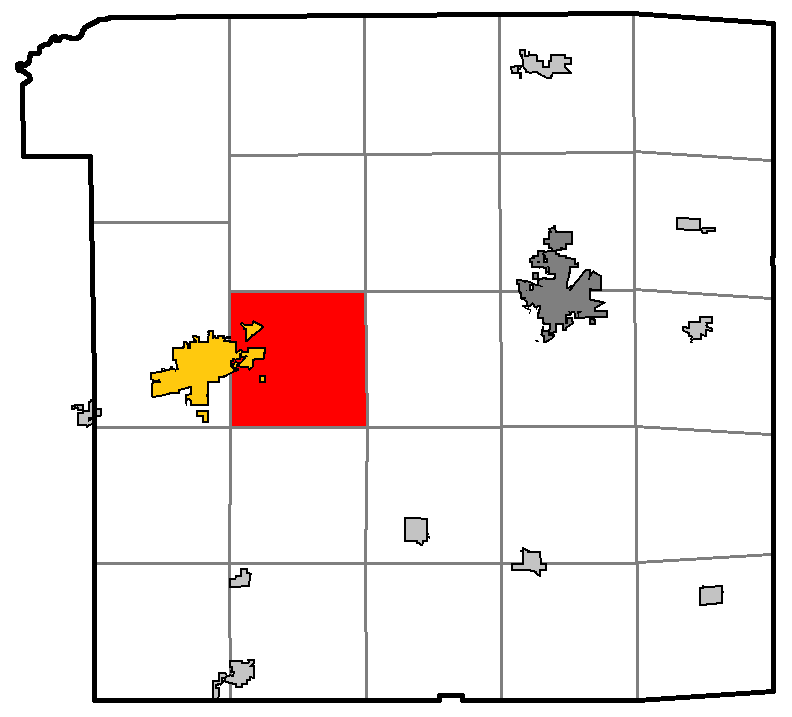
- Location of Angelo, Monroe County

- Location of Monroe County, Wisconsin
- Coordinates: 43°56′36″N 90°45′17″W
- Country: United States
- State: Wisconsin
- County: Monroe

Area
  - Total: 34.8 sq mi (90.1 km^{2})
  - Land: 34.7 sq mi (89.8 km^{2})
  - Water: 0.12 sq mi (0.3 km^{2})
- Elevation: 850 ft (260 m)

Population (2020)
  - Total: 1,697
  - Density: 48.9/sq mi (18.9/km^{2})
- Time zone: UTC-6 (Central (CST))
  - Summer (DST): UTC-5 (CDT)
- Area code: 608
- FIPS code: 55-02025
- GNIS feature ID: 1582696
- Website: https://townofangelo.com/

Angelo is a town in Monroe County, Wisconsin, United States. The population was 1,697 at the 2020 census. The unincorporated community of Farmers Valley is also located partially in the town.

== History ==
Angelo was named after the first settler of the town.

== Geography ==
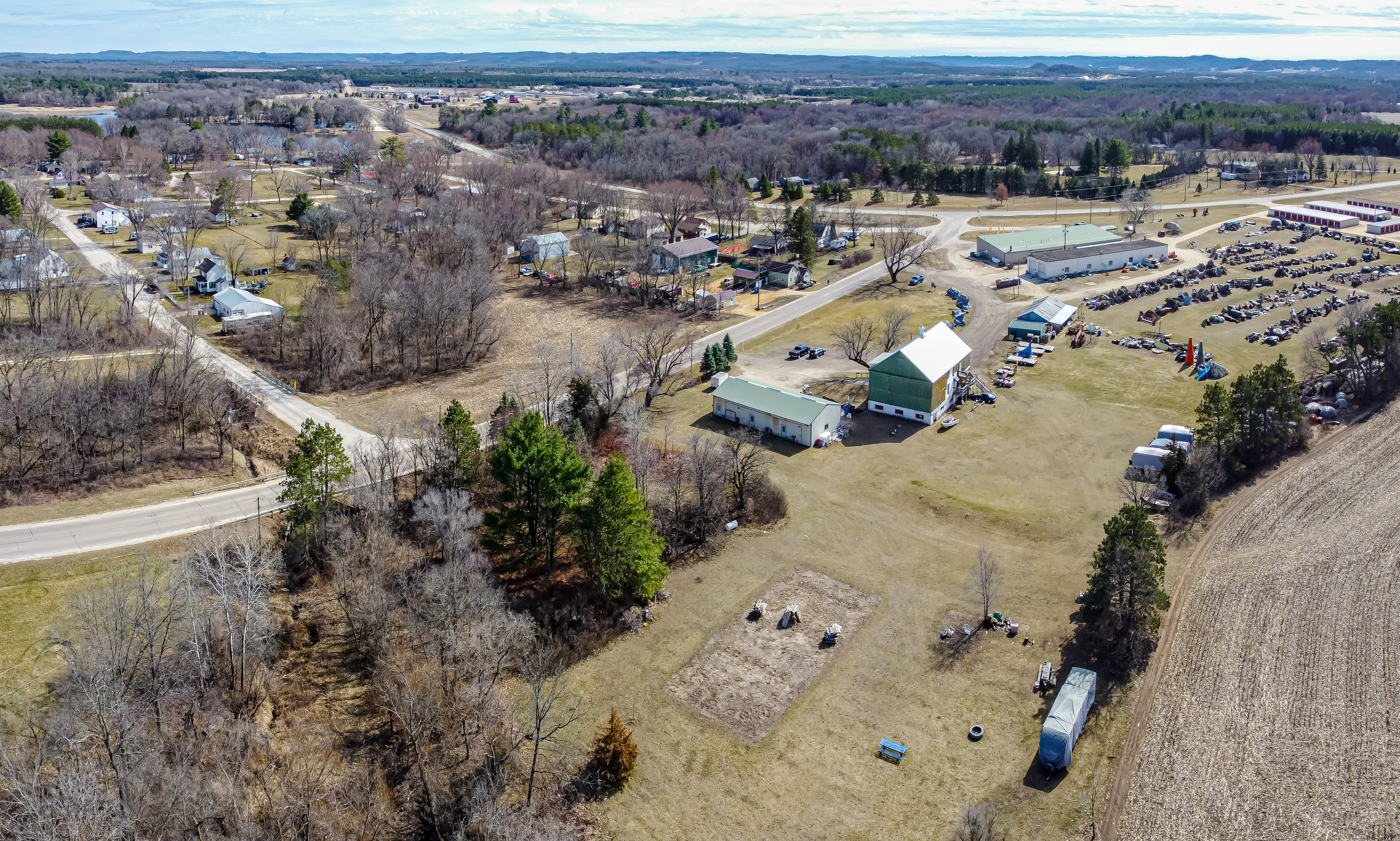
Wis-21 runs through town

According to the United States Census Bureau, the town has a total area of 34.8 square miles (90.1 km^{2}), of which 34.7 square miles (89.8 km^{2}) is land and 0.1 square mile (0.3 km^{2}) (0.37%) is water.

== Demographics ==
At the 2000 census there were 1,268 people, 465 households, and 360 families in the town. The population density was 36.6 people per square mile (14.1/km^{2}). There were 517 housing units at an average density of 14.9 per square mile (5.8/km^{2}). The racial makeup of the town was 96.53% White, 0.24% African American, 0.08% Native American, 0.16% Asian, 1.58% from other races, and 1.42% from two or more races. Hispanic or Latino of any race were 2.37%.

Of the 465 households 36.1% had children under the age of 18 living with them, 65.2% were married couples living together, 8.4% had a female householder with no husband present, and 22.4% were non-families. 18.5% of households were one person and 6.7% were one person aged 65 or older. The average household size was 2.72 and the average family size was 3.06.

The age distribution was 28.5% under the age of 18, 6.5% from 18 to 24, 29.7% from 25 to 44, 24.4% from 45 to 64, and 10.9% 65 or older. The median age was 37 years. For every 100 females, there were 105.5 males. For every 100 females age 18 and over, there were 101.6 males.

The median household income was $40,163 and the median family income was $41,776. Males had a median income of $28,906 versus $20,703 for females. The per capita income for the town was $15,727. About 6.9% of families and 9.1% of the population were below the poverty line, including 10.0% of those under age 18 and 7.6% of those age 65 or over.

== See also ==
- Fort McCoy (base) - the Sparta/Fort McCoy Airport is in Angelo and part of the Fort McCoy
