= 1964 Wisconsin Supreme Court election =

- April 7, 1964

Candidate	Horace W. Wilkie	Howard H. Boyle Jr.
Popular vote	556,639	489,703
Percentage	53.20%	46.80%
- Wilkie: 50–60% 60–70% 70–80% Boyle: 50–60% 60–70% 80–90%
Justice before election
Horace W. Wilkie
Elected Justice
Horace W. Wilkie

The 1964 Wisconsin Supreme Court election was held on Tuesday, April 7, 1964, to elect a justice to the Wisconsin Supreme Court for a ten-year term. The incumbent justice Horace W. Wilkie won re-election over challenger Howard H. Boyle Jr. Prior to the general election, a third candidate, Harry E. Larsen, was eliminated in a primary election held on March 10.

Boyle centered his candidacy on castigating Wilkie for joining the majority in the McCauley v. Tropic of Cancer ruling of early 1964, in which the court had held that the novel Tropic of Cancer by Henry Miller was not legally obscene, an outcome that had been very unpopular with the public. Boyle's decision to campaign in this manner attracted criticism accusing him of acting in violation of canon 30 of the American Bar Association's Canons of Judicial Ethics. Boyle's performance in the primary and general elections was unexpectedly competitive against Wilkie, who had originally been expected to have an easy re-election.

== Background ==
Wilkie had been appointed to the court in 1962 by Governor Gaylord A. Nelson. The 1964 election was his first election to retain his judgeship. The election was held during the state's spring elections. During the spring primaries, the judicial primary was the only statewide ballot item, as no additional statewide offices questions were presented to voters on the spring primary ballot.

The spring primary was the first Wisconsin election to be held after the state legislature had repealed an 1859 law previously mandating that taverns be closed during polling times. Following the state repeal, it was left for individual localities to decide whether or not to impose such tavern closures. Milwaukee opted to close its taverns, while Green Bay and Kenosha were among the communities to allow taverns to remain open during polling hours.

== Primary election ==
=== Candidates ===
==== Advanced ====
- Horace W. Wilkie, incumbent justice and former state senator (1957–1962)
- Howard H. Boyle Jr., Beaver Dam-based attorney; candidate U.S. Senate candidate in 1956 and 1957

==== Eliminated in the primary ====
- Harry E. Larsen, Superior-based attorney; runner-up of the 1963 Supreme Court election

=== Campaign ===
Wilkie (photographed) was perceived to be an overwhelming front-runner before the results of the primary

Wilkie was perceived as the overwhelming front-runner in the election. He received endorsements from most major elected officials and newspaper editorial boards in Wisconsin. Ahead of the primary, observers were confident in their expectation that the incumbent Wilkie would advance to the general election. However, many had mis-anticipated that Larsen would be his opponent. Boyle had been the last of the three candidates to launch his campaign, and his advancement to the general election came as a surprise. Boyle was a late entrant into the race. As the third candidate to qualify for the ballot, his entrance forced a primary election to be held (which would not have been necessary if only two candidates had run). Ahead of the primary election, Wilkie outlined a six-point proposal for improving the state's legal system. In this, he proposed that a reorganization of the state's court system could cut down on the case backlog that its trial courts were facing. He also called for court reforms to strengthen the Judicial Council.

Wilkie fiercely defended the ruling in McCauley v. Tropic of Cancer against Boyle's onslaught of attacks. He asserted that "pornography was not the issue" in the decision, but rather that the decision was about "affirming the right of free expression" in accordance with the United States Supreme Court's test for obscenity. Wilkie also made a case that the "independence of judges" was of paramount importance in Wisconsin's courts, remarking:

The integrity and independence of Wisconsin's judicial system would be endangered if the election of a judge were based on the momentary popularity of a decision.

During his primary campaign, Boyle positioned himself as an opponent of liberal judicial philosophy. Additionally, he highlighted bolstering the separation of powers between the state legislature and judiciary as another key concern of his campaign. In his relatively brief campaign ahead of the primary, Boyle used up only $318 in campaign expenditures. Spending very little time or funds, his strong performance in the primary was particularly unexpected. He greatly outperformed his vote total in either of his previous campaigns for the U.S. senate.

In both the primary and general elections, Boyle aggressively condemned Wilkie for joining the majority in the McCauley v. Tropic of Cancer ruling of early 1964, in which the court had held that the novel Tropic of Cancer by Henry Miller was not legally obscene. He argued that the ruling would be a slippery slope toward permitting pornography and that a vote for him against Wilkie would be a "Vote Against Smut". The outcome of the case had been publicly unpopular, and Boyle sought to capitalize off the public frustration. His tactic of framing his candidacy as one in opposition to smut attracted support for Boyle from the Roman Catholic Diocese of Green Bay. However, many in Wisconsin were highly critical of his campaign approach.

Harry E. Larsen, who was eliminated in the primary, spoke of his belief that protecting individual liberties under the law was of paramount importance when enforcing the rule of law. He also proposed imposing a 40-hour workweek for Wisconsin judges and capping their vacations in order to lessen the state court system's case backlog.

Larsen criticized Wilkie's six-point plan for judicial reform. Among his criticisms offered was a critique of Wilkie's for supporting a strengthening of the Judicial Council. Larsen argued that the council stood as an opponent to Wisconsin's voters' power to elect their judges, characterizing it as recently having been "the instigator and chief sponsor" of attempts to end Wisconsin's practice of electing its judges in favor of a Missouri Plan.

=== Primary results ===
Primary results by county: Wilkie: Wilkie—30–40%; Wilkie—40–50%; Wilkie—50–60%; Wilkie—60–70%; Boyle: Boyle—30–40%; Boyle—40–50%; Boyle—50–60%; Boyle—60–70%; Boyle—70–80%; Boyle—80–90%; Larsen: Larsen—30–40%; Larsen—40–50%; Larsen—50–60%; Larsen—60–70%; Larsen—70–80%

The narrowness of the margin by which Wilkie led in the primary left uncertainty heading into the general election as to which candidate might prevail. A race that had been widely seen as a near certain Wilkie victory suddenly became perceived as a competitive one.

The result of the primary election was unexpected; Boyle surprisingly advanced to the general election and came within only a few points of Wilkie's vote share. The result included a narrow margin between Boyle and Wilkie in the state's most populous county: Milwaukee County.

The primary saw 376,248 votes cast, out of 2.2 million eligible voters in the state. This was greater than the turnout of 355,000 that election officials had forecast. The higher-than-expected turnout may have been in part the result of good weather across the state on election day.

1964 Wisconsin Supreme Court election
Party	Candidate	Votes	%
Primary election (March 10, 1964)
Nonpartisan	Horace W. Wilkie (incumbent)	141,041	37.49
Nonpartisan	Howard H. Boyle Jr.	127,020	33.76
Nonpartisan	Harry E. Larsen	108,187	28.75
Total votes		376,248	100

== General election ==
=== Campaign ===
Newspaper advertisement for Wilkie's campaign, featuring a photograph of him with his family

After the primary, the Milwaukee Journal editorial board argued that Boyle's framing of his candidacy was "highly questionable...for a judicial candidate", as it appeared to indicate that as a justice he himself would disregard law and legal precedent in order to deliver a popular decision. All six of Wilkie's fellow justices rebuked Boyle as resorting to campaign tactics that "blatantly cater to prejudice" and "utterly lack the essential quality of judicial mind and temperament". Boyle also faced accusations that his campaign conduct violated canon 30 of the Canons of Judicial Ethics of the American Bar Association, a rule that stated:

A candidate for judicial positions should not make or suffer others to make for him, promises of conduct in office which appeal to the cupidity or prejuices of the appointing or electing power; he should not announce in advance his conclusion of law on disputed issues to secure class support, and he should do nothing while a candidate to create the impression that if chosen, he will administer his office with bias, partiality or improper discrimination.

The Milwaukee Junior Bar Association censured Boyle for what it asserted was a "clear and direct violation of canon 30 of the canons of judicial ethics." The editorial board of The Post-Crescent also believed that Boyle had violated canon 30.

During the campaign Wilkie fiercely defended the ruling in McCauley v. Tropic of Cancer against Boyle's onslaught of attacks. He asserted that "pornography was not the issue" in the decision, but rather that the decision was about "affirming the right of free expression" in accordance with the United States Supreme Court's test for obscenity. Wilkie also made a case that the "independence of judges" was of paramount importance in Wisconsin's courts, remarking:

The integrity and independence of Wisconsin's judicial system would be endangered if the election of a judge were based on the momentary popularity of a decision.

=== Results ===
Wilkie won re-election, though by a margin that was to many observers surprisingly narrow.

1964 Wisconsin Supreme Court election
Party	Candidate	Votes	%
General election (April 7, 1964)
Nonpartisan	Horace W. Wilkie (incumbent)	556,639	53.20
Nonpartisan	Howard H. Boyle Jr.	489,703	46.80
Total votes		1,046,342	100
