= Nathan Heffernan =

American judge (1920–2007)

The Honorable Nathan Heffernan
- Portrait photograph, circa 1983

23rd Chief Justice of the Wisconsin Supreme Court
- In office August 1, 1983 – July 31, 1995
- Preceded by: Bruce F. Beilfuss
- Succeeded by: Roland B. Day

Justice of the Wisconsin Supreme Court
- In office August 17, 1964 – July 31, 1995
- Appointed by: John W. Reynolds, Jr.
- Preceded by: William H. Dieterich
- Succeeded by: Ann Walsh Bradley

United States Attorney for the Western District of Wisconsin
- In office 1962–1964
- President: John F. Kennedy; Lyndon B. Johnson
- Preceded by: George E. Rapp
- Succeeded by: Michael J. Wyngaard

City Attorney of Sheboygan
- In office 1953–1959

Personal details
- Born: Nathan Stewart Heffernan; August 6, 1920 Frederic, Wisconsin, U.S
- Died: April 13, 2007 (aged 86) Madison, Wisconsin, U.S.
- Resting place: Forest Hill Cemetery; Madison, Wisconsin
- Spouse: Dorothy Lucile Hillemann
- Children: 3
- Education: University of Wisconsin; Harvard Business School; Wisconsin Law School

Nathan Stewart Heffernan (August 6, 1920 – April 13, 2007) was an American lawyer and judge. He was the 23rd Chief Justice of the Wisconsin Supreme Court from 1983 to 1995. Earlier in his career he served as United States Attorney for the Western District of Wisconsin.

== Early life and education ==
Heffernan was born on August 6, 1920 in Frederic, Wisconsin. He attended school in Sheboygan, Wisconsin, graduating from Sheboygan High School. In 1942, he graduated from the University of Wisconsin–Madison. Heffernan served in the Navy during World War II, and attended the Harvard Graduate School of Business. He then graduated Order of the Coif from the University of Wisconsin Law School in 1948.

== Career ==
Portrait photograph, circa 1965

Portrait photograph, circa 1969

Heffernan worked in a private law practice in Sheboygan at the firm of Buchen & Heffernan from 1948 to 1959. During this time he served as the Assistant District Attorney for Sheboygan County from 1951 to 1953, and as the City Attorney of Sheboygan from 1953 to 1959. At that time, Heffernan resigned his duties from his law firm and became Deputy Attorney General of Wisconsin, and remained in that position until 1962 when he was appointed as a United States Attorney for the Western District of Wisconsin by President John F. Kennedy.

In 1964, Wisconsin Governor John W. Reynolds appointed Heffernan to the Wisconsin Supreme Court. Heffernan won election to the seat in 1965, and was re-elected in 1975 and 1985. He became Chief Justice of that court in 1983, and retired in 1995. The 31 years that Heffernan spent on the Supreme Court make him the third longest-serving judge in Wisconsin history. Heffernan was considered to be a member of the court's ideologically liberal wing.

Heffernan taught summer courses on appellate administration and opinion writing at New York University School of Law and was an adjunct professor of appellate practice and procedure at the University of Wisconsin Law School for fifteen years.

== Personal life ==
Heffernan married Dorothy Hillemann. They had three children: Katie, Michael, and Thomas.

Heffernan died on April 13, 2007 in Madison, Wisconsin.

Legal offices
Preceded by George E. Rapp	United States Attorney for the Western District of Wisconsin; 1962–1964	Succeeded by Michael J. Wyngaard
Preceded by William H. Dieterich	Justice of the Wisconsin Supreme Court; 1964–1995	Succeeded by Ann Walsh Bradley
Preceded by Bruce F. Beilfuss	Chief Justice of the Wisconsin Supreme Court; 1983–1995	Succeeded by Roland B. Day
