= Amrose B. Coller =

American politician

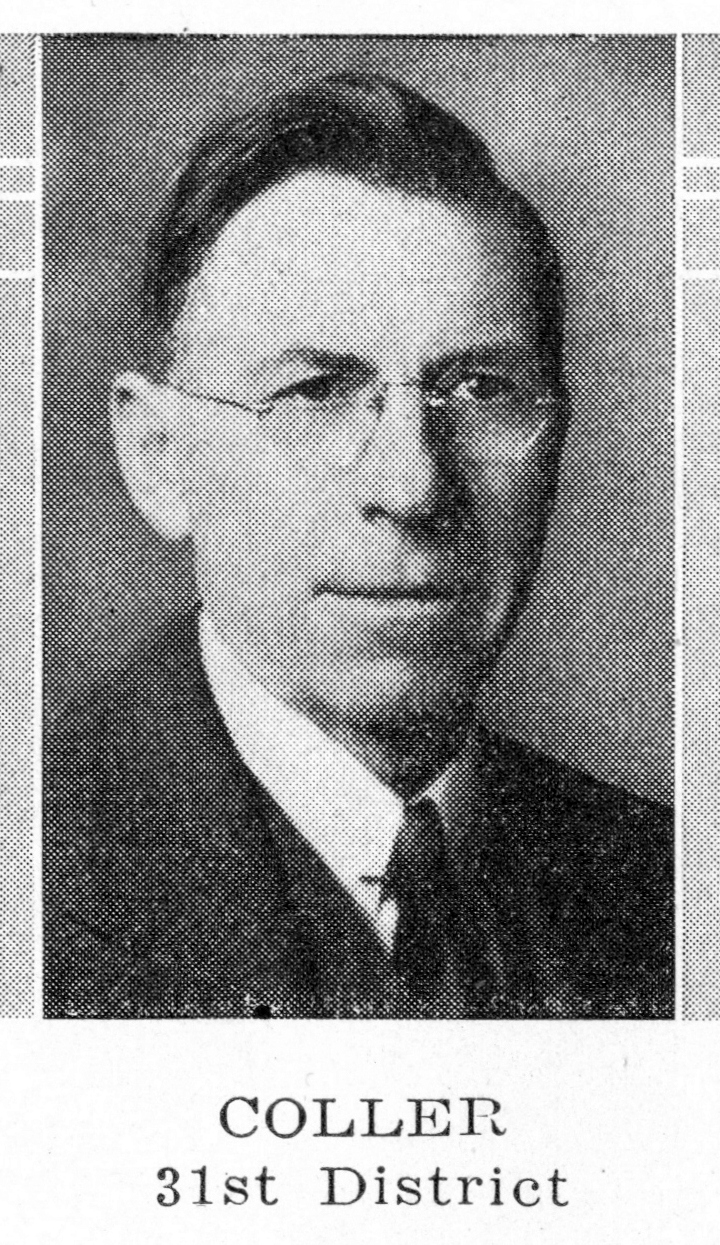
Ambrose Benson Coller

Amrose Benson Coller (September 6, 1885 – June 6, 1951) was a member of the Wisconsin State Senate.

== Biography ==
Coller was born on September 6, 1885, in Marquette, Wisconsin. On July 10, 1910, he married Anna Christine Martin. He died on June 6, 1951, in Madison, Wisconsin.

== Career ==
Coller was a member of the Senate during the 1939 and 1941 sessions. He was a Republican.
