= James Devitt (politician) =

American politician (1929 - 1989)

James C. Devitt (October 12, 1929 – March 2, 1989) was an American politician and businessman.

Born in La Crosse, Wisconsin, he graduated from St. John's Cathedral High School in Milwaukee, Wisconsin and went to Marquette University. He served in the United States Army Reserve and was a real estate developer.

A resident of Greenfield, he served in the Wisconsin State Assembly in 1967 as a Republican. In 1968, Devitt was elected to the Wisconsin State Senate.

In 1976, Devitt was convicted of a felony and removed from office after giving false testimony about his campaign finances.

Devitt died on March 2, 1989.
