= John E. Martin =

American politician and jurist

The Honorable John E. Martin
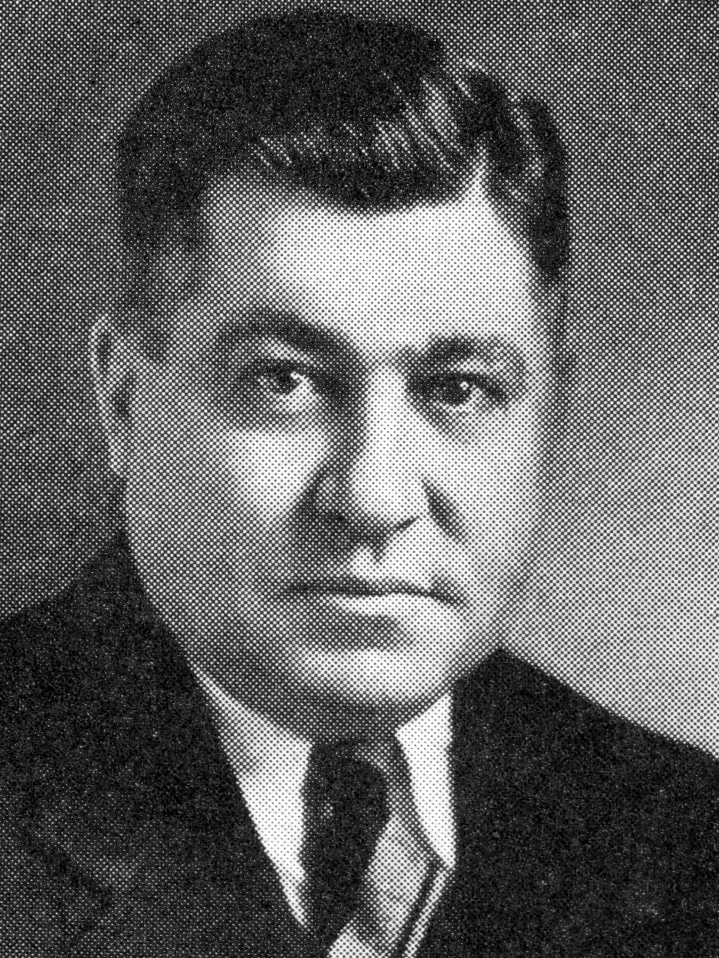
- Martin c. 1940

16th Chief Justice of the Wisconsin Supreme Court
- In office January 7, 1957 – January 1, 1962
- Preceded by: Edward T. Fairchild
- Succeeded by: Grover L. Broadfoot

Justice of the Wisconsin Supreme Court
- In office June 1, 1948 – January 1, 1962
- Appointed by: Oscar Rennebohm
- Preceded by: Chester A. Fowler
- Succeeded by: Myron L. Gordon

29th Attorney General of Wisconsin
- In office January 2, 1939 – June 1, 1948
- Governor: Julius P. Heil; Walter Samuel Goodland; Oscar Rennebohm
- Preceded by: Orland Steen Loomis
- Succeeded by: Grover L. Broadfoot

Personal details
- Born: John Edward Martin; November 15, 1891 Green Bay, Wisconsin, U.S.
- Died: December 9, 1968 (aged 77) Madison, Wisconsin, U.S.
- Resting place: Resurrection Cemetery; Madison, Wisconsin
- Party: Republican
- Spouses: Mary Kerwin; (died 1974)
- Children: John Edward Martin, Jr.; Mary Hope
- Parents: Patrick Henry Martin (father); Mary Ellen (Wigman) Martin (mother)
- Relatives: Joseph Martin (uncle)
- Education: University of Wisconsin–Madison; Notre Dame Law School

Military service
- Allegiance: United States
- Branch/service: United States Army; American Expeditionary Forces
- Years of service: 1917–1921
- Rank: Captain
- Unit: 127th Infantry Reg., 32nd Div.
- Battles/wars: World War I
- Awards: Purple Heart

John Edward Martin Sr. (November 15, 1891 – December 9, 1968) was an American lawyer, politician, and jurist from Green Bay, Wisconsin. He was the 16th chief justice of the Wisconsin Supreme Court (1957–1962), and served a total of 14 years on the high court (1948–1962). Before his appointment to the Supreme Court, he served as the 29th attorney general of Wisconsin, and is the only person to have been elected to five terms as attorney general of Wisconsin (1939–1948).

His uncle and law partner, Joseph Martin, also served as a justice of the Wisconsin Supreme Court.

== Early life and education ==
Born in Green Bay, Wisconsin, to Mary Ellen Wigman Martin and Patrick Henry Martin. A Roman Catholic, he was educated at parochial and public schools in Green Bay, graduating from Green Bay East High School in 1909. He attended the University of Wisconsin–Madison and Marquette University, and graduated from Notre Dame Law School in 1916 to become a practicing attorney.

== World War I ==
He enlisted in the U.S. Army in August 1917, and was commissioned a lieutenant after attending officer training at Fort Sheridan, Illinois. He fought in World War I as a first lieutenant in Company E, 127th Infantry Regiment, 32nd Division. He was wounded during the war, and awarded a Purple Heart. He was honorably discharged as a captain in 1921. During the war, he served alongside future Wisconsin Supreme Court justices Theodore G. Lewis, Edward J. Gehl, and Roland J. Steinle.

== Public office ==
Portrait photograph, as a justice

After the war, Martin returned to Green Bay and practiced law, partnering with his father and his uncle, Joseph Martin, who would also later serve on the Wisconsin Supreme Court. In 1933, John was appointed an assistant district attorney in Milwaukee.

In 1938, Martin was elected Wisconsin Attorney General, defeating incumbent Progressive Orland Steen Loomis. He would go on to serve nearly a decade in that office, earning re-election in 1940, 1942, 1944, and 1946.

In June, 1948, he was appointed to the Wisconsin Supreme Court by Governor Oscar Rennebohm to fill the vacancy created by the death of Justice Chester A. Fowler. Martin was elected in 1950 to complete the remainder of Fowler's term, and was elected to a full term in 1951. He became chief justice in 1957 upon the retirement of Chief Justice Edward T. Fairchild. In 1961, Martin was the first Wisconsinite to serve as chair of the National Conference of Chief Justices. Martin did not seek re-election in 1961, and his term expired January 1962. However, after his term, he was appointed the first court administrator of Wisconsin.

He retired due to poor health in 1967.

== Personal life and family ==
Martin was married to Mary Kerwin; they had two children, John Jr. and Mary Hope.

Martin died December 9, 1968, in Madison, Wisconsin. He was buried at Resurrection Cemetery, in northwest Madison.

== Electoral history ==
=== Wisconsin Attorney General (1938-1946) ===
1938 Wisconsin Attorney General election
Party	Candidate	Votes	%	±%
Primary Election
Progressive	Orland Steen Loomis (incumbent)	136,005	30.94%	
Republican	John E. Martin	117,509	26.73%	
Republican	Richard P. Murray	67,804	15.43%	
Democratic	James E. Finnegan	50,268	11.44%	
Democratic	John E. Martin	36,820	8.38%	
Democratic	LaVern Dilweg	30,794	7.56%	
Union	Mr. Tierney	343	0.08%	
Total votes		'439,543'	'100.0%'	
General Election
Republican	John E. Martin	431,678	48.04%	
Progressive	Orland Steen Loomis (incumbent)	316,657	35.24%	
Democratic	James E. Finnegan	148,426	16.52%	
Socialist Labor	Adolf Wiggert, Jr.	1,758	0.20%	
Total votes		'898,519'	'100.0%'	
Republican gain from Progressive				

1940 Wisconsin Attorney General election
Party	Candidate	Votes	%	±%
Primary Election
Republican	John E. Martin (incumbent)	199,766	35.74%	
Republican	William H. Markham	114,090	20.41%	
Democratic	Gustave J. Keller	112,700	20.16%	
Progressive	Otto F. Christensen	61,890	11.07%	
Progressive	G. Erle Ingram	39,493	7.07%	
Progressive	Charles A. Kading	30,970	5.54%	
Total votes		'558,909'	'100.0%'	
General Election
Republican	John E. Martin (incumbent)	605,680	49.12%	
Progressive	Otto F. Christensen	367,009	29.76%	
Democratic	Gustave J. Keller	257,786	20.91%	
Socialist Labor	Arnold Fortman	2,568	0.21%	
Total votes		'1,233,043'	'100.0%'	+37.23%
Republican hold				

1942 Wisconsin Attorney General election
Party	Candidate	Votes	%	±%
Primary Election
Republican	John E. Martin (incumbent)	209,871	66.76%	
Democratic	James A. Fitzpatrick	52,736	16.78%	
Progressive	William H. Dieterich	25,398	8.08%	
Progressive	Arthur Spence	21,270	6.77%	
Socialist	Anna Mae Davis	5,076	1.61%	
Total votes		'314,351'	'100.0%'	
General Election
Republican	John E. Martin (incumbent)	367,179	50.84%	
Progressive	William H. Dieterich	205,730	28.48%	
Democratic	James A. Fitzpatrick	135,889	18.81%	
Socialist	Anna Mae Davis	12,098	1.67%	
Socialist Labor	Alex Schaufelberger	1,376	1.67%	
Total votes		'722,272'	'100.0%'	-41.42%
Republican hold				

1944 Wisconsin Attorney General election
Party	Candidate	Votes	%	±%
Primary Election
Republican	John E. Martin (incumbent)	230,867	67.01%	
Democratic	Gustave J. Keller	85,617	24.85%	
Progressive	William H. Dieterich	15,204	4.41%	
Progressive	Lloyd Chambers	9,797	2.84%	
Socialist	Anna Mae Davis	3,041	0.88%	
Total votes		'344,526'	'100.0%'	
General Election
Republican	John E. Martin (incumbent)	645,261	53.13%	
Democratic	Gustave J. Keller	469,800	38.68%	
Progressive	William H. Dieterich	84,989	7.00%	
Socialist	Anna Mae Davis	14,406	1.19%	
Total votes		'1,214,456'	'100.0%'	+68.14%
Republican hold				

1946 Wisconsin Attorney General election
Party	Candidate	Votes	%	±%
Primary Election
Republican	John E. Martin (incumbent)	198,926	44.89%	
Republican	Herman C. Runge	95,041	21.45%	
Republican	William H. Dieterich	90,719	20.47%	
Democratic	Elizabeth Hawkes	54,874	12.38%	
Socialist	Anna Mae Davis	3,606	0.81%	
Total votes		'443,166'	'100.0%'	
General Election
Republican	John E. Martin (incumbent)	682,591	69.96%	
Democratic	Elizabeth Hawkes	280,145	28.71%	
Socialist	Anna Mae Davis	12,919	1.32%	
Total votes		'975,655'	'100.0%'	-19.66%
Republican hold				

=== Wisconsin Supreme Court (1950, 1951) ===
1950 Wisconsin Supreme Court special election
Party	Candidate	Votes	%	±%
Nonpartisan	John E. Martin (incumbent)	300,476	58.89	
Nonpartisan	Marshall Peterson	209,720	41.11	
Total votes		510,196	100	

1951 Wisconsin Supreme Court election
Party	Candidate	Votes	%	±%
Nonpartisan	John E. Martin (incumbent)	515,599	100	
Total votes		515,599	100	

Party political offices
Preceded by Herman C. Runge	Republican nominee for Attorney General of Wisconsin; 1938, 1940, 1942, 1944, 1946	Succeeded by Donald J. Martin
Legal offices
Preceded by Orland Steen Loomis	Attorney General of Wisconsin; 1939 – 1948	Succeeded by Grover L. Broadfoot
Preceded by Chester A. Fowler	Justice of the Wisconsin Supreme Court; 1948 – 1962	Succeeded by Myron L. Gordon
Preceded by Edward T. Fairchild	Chief Justice of the Wisconsin Supreme Court; 1957 – 1962	Succeeded by Grover L. Broadfoot
