= Willis E. Donley =

American politician and lawyer

Willis E. Donley (June 24, 1901 – June 6, 1985) was an American politician and lawyer.

Born in the Town of Frankfort, Pepin County, Wisconsin, Donley went to Durand High School. He then went to Ripon College and the Marquette University Law School. Donley then practiced law. In 1933, Donley served in the Wisconsin State Assembly and was a Democrat.

His son, Terrence Joseph Donley, was a career criminal, serving time for narcotics and cashing bad checks. One scam involved his claiming to be the son of Lowell Thomas. In the 1970s, Terrence Donley worked as an undercover operative for Wisconsin Attorney General Robert Warren. In 1983, he came forward, claiming that Warren had ordered him to commit illegal acts in order to frame Mafia chieftain Frank Balistrieri.
