= Horace W. Wilkie =

American judge and politician

The Honorable Horace W. Wilkie
- portrait photograph, as justice in the 1960s

21st Chief Justice of the Wisconsin Supreme Court
- In office August 1, 1974 – May 23, 1976
- Preceded by: E. Harold Hallows
- Succeeded by: Bruce F. Beilfuss

Justice of the Wisconsin Supreme Court
- In office June 5, 1962 – May 23, 1976
- Appointed by: Gaylord Nelson
- Preceded by: Grover L. Broadfoot
- Succeeded by: Shirley Abrahamson

Member of the Wisconsin Senate from the 26th district
- In office January 7, 1957 – June 5, 1962
- Preceded by: Gaylord Nelson
- Succeeded by: Fred A. Risser

Chairman of the Madison Housing Authority
- In office 1945–1950

Personal details
- Born: January 9, 1917 Madison, Wisconsin, U.S.
- Died: May 23, 1976 (aged 59) Pittsburgh, Pennsylvania, U.S.
- Cause of death: Heart attack
- Resting place: Roselawn Memorial Park, Monona, Wisconsin
- Party: Democratic
- Spouse: Marian Cora Beardsley (died 1998)
- Children: 5 daughters
- Parent: Harold M. Wilkie (father)
- Education: University of Wisconsin–Madison; George Washington University
- Profession: lawyer, judge

Military service
- Allegiance: United States
- Branch/service: United States Coast Guard

Horace White Wilkie (January 9, 1917 – May 23, 1976) was an American attorney, judge, and Democratic politician from the U.S. state of Wisconsin. He was the 21st Chief Justice of the Wisconsin Supreme Court (1974–1976) and served a total of 14 years on the court (1962–1976). Before being appointed to the Court, he served five years in the Wisconsin State Senate, representing Madison, Wisconsin.

== Early life, family, education, and career ==
Wilkie was in Madison, Wisconsin on January 19, 1917. Wilkie's father, Harold M. Wilkie, was a prominent Wisconsin lawyer, and served as member of the Board of Regents for the University of Wisconsin. One of Wilkie's brothers, Edwin (a member of the Republican Party) served as both the district attorney of Dane County and as a Dane County Circuit Court judge.

Wilkie attended elementary school and high school locally in Madison. He then attended what is now the University of Wisconsin–Madison, graduating in 1933 with a Bachelor of Arts. While attending undergrad, he joined the Phi Beta Kappa fraternity.

Wilkie completing some graduate work in the field of public administration at various institutions, including the University of Minnesota (1938–1939) and American University (1939–1940), and the National Institute of Public Affairs. While studying at American University, he was employed by the U .S. Budget Bureau as an analyst, and also was a consultant to the U.S. State Department. Wilkie studied law at George Washington University, where he graduated with a law degree in 1944. From 1942 to 1945, he also served in the United States Coast Guard, amid World War II.

== Private practice ==
After World War II, Wilkie returned to Madison to practice law, engaging in private practice from 1945 until 1962.

== Career in Democratic Party organizing ==
After World War II, Wilkie was involved in reviving the fortunes of the Democratic Party of Wisconsin with other young liberals and former members of the Wisconsin Progressive Party in what was known as the Democratic Organizing Committee.

Wilkie also served as chairman of the Dane County Democratic Club, and was involved in Young Democrats. Wilkie subsequently became chairman of the Dane County Democratic Party, and later became congressional district Democratic chairman district and vice-chairman of the Democratic Party of Wisconsin. For three years, he served as chairman of the Democratic Part of Wisconsin's state platform committee. In this role, he advocated stances in support of stricter anti-trust laws, national housing legislation, and implementation of a national government health insurance administrated by the Social Security Administration.

Wilkie unsuccessfully sought election to the state party chairmanship, being defeated by Philleo Nash.

== Municipal positions, unsuccessful congressional campaigns ==
From 1945 through 1950, Wilkie was the chairman of the Madison Housing Authority. From 1956 through 1958, he was a member of the city mayor's Metropolitan Development Committee.

Wilkie ran unsuccessfully for the United States House of Representatives: in 1948, 1950, and 1952.

== State senator ==
In 1956, Wilkie was elected to the Wisconsin State Senate, representing the 26th district. He was re-elected in 1960. As a state senator, he frequently backed liberal legislation. This included supporting more liberal laws regarding public welfare, stricter campaign finance and election laws, and pay increases for faculty at state universities. During the governorship of fellow Democrat Gaylord Nelson, Wilkie was a legislative ally of Nelson's.

Wilkie served on the Education; Welfare; Labor; Taxation; Insurance and Banking; and Joint Finance committees. He was a member of the ad hoc committee that crafted compromise legislation on state sales tax adopted in 1961.

== Supreme Court of Wisconsin ==
portrait photograph as justice, in the 1960s

In 1962, Nelson appointed Wilkie to the Wisconsin Supreme Court to fill the seat left vacant by the death of Grover L. Broadfoot. Wilkie was subsequently elected to two full terms on the court in 1964 and 1974. After Chief Justice E. Harold Hallows took ill in 1973, Wilkie assumed the role of chief justice on an acting basis. After Hallows retired in August 1974, he permanently became chief justice. Wilkie served until his death on May 23, 1976.

== Personal life and death ==
In 1939 Wilkie married the former Marian Beardsley.

Wilkie died of a heart attack in Pittsburgh, Pennsylvania on May 23, 1976. He was survived by his widow and by five daughters.

An odd coincidence of Justice Wilkie's career is that his successors in the Wisconsin State Senate and Wisconsin Supreme Court both became the longest-serving members of those respective bodies. Fred A. Risser, who succeeded him in the Senate, served from 1962 until 2021. Shirley Abrahamson, who succeeded him on the Wisconsin Supreme Court, served from 1976 until 2019.

Wisconsin Senate
Preceded by Gaylord Nelson	Member of the Wisconsin Senate from the 26th district January 7, 1957 – June 5, 1962	Succeeded by Fred A. Risser
Legal offices
Preceded by Grover L. Broadfoot	Justice of the Wisconsin Supreme Court; June 5, 1962 – May 23, 1976	Succeeded by Shirley Abrahamson
Preceded by E. Harold Hallows	Chief Justice of the Wisconsin Supreme Court; September 11, 1974 – May 23, 1976	Succeeded by Bruce F. Beilfuss
