= E. Harold Hallows =

American judge

The Honorable E. Harold Hallows
- portrait photograph, circa 1969

20th Chief Justice of the Wisconsin Supreme Court
- In office January 1, 1968 – August 1, 1974
- Preceded by: George R. Currie
- Succeeded by: Horace W. Wilkie

Justice of the Wisconsin Supreme Court
- In office May 1, 1958 – August 1, 1974
- Appointed by: Vernon Wallace Thomson
- Preceded by: Roland J. Steinle
- Succeeded by: Roland B. Day

Personal details
- Born: Emery Harold Hallows; April 20, 1904 Fond du Lac, Wisconsin, U.S.
- Died: September 11, 1974 (aged 70) University Hospital, Madison, Wisconsin, U.S.
- Cause of death: Leukemia
- Spouse: Mary Vivian Hurley (m. 1930; died 1973)
- Children: Joseph, Mary
- Education: Marquette University; University of Chicago Law School
- Profession: Lawyer, judge

Emery Harold Hallows (April 20, 1904 – September 11, 1974) was an American attorney and jurist who served as the 20th Chief Justice of the Wisconsin Supreme Court, from January 1968 until his resignation in August 1974.

== Biography ==
Born in Fond du Lac, Wisconsin, Hallows graduated from Marquette University and received his J.D. degree from the University of Chicago Law School. Hallows practiced law in Milwaukee, Wisconsin, and taught at the Marquette University Law School. In 1958, Hallows was appointed to the Wisconsin Supreme Court and became chief justice of the court in 1968 serving until his retirement in 1974.

Portrait photograph of Hallows as a justice

Hallows won elections to his seat on the court in 1959 and 1969.

Hallows authored the Court's opinion in the influential case Breunig v. American Family Insurance Company, which established the rule that a sudden mental incapacity, of which the defendant had no foreknowledge, was an adequate defense to tort liability. This rule is often known as the Breunig exception.

== Personal life and family ==
Hallows met his wife, Mary Vivian Hurley, while they were both students at Marquette University. They married February 15, 1930, at St. Catherine's Church in Milwaukee. They had at least two children together. Mary died in April 1973 after a long illness, stemming from a series of strokes. Judge Hallows announced a short time later that he was being treated for leukemia. He died on September 11, 1974, just a month after retiring from the Court.

Legal offices
Preceded by Roland J. Steinle	Justice of the Wisconsin Supreme Court; May 1, 1958 – August 1, 1974	Succeeded by Roland B. Day
Preceded by George R. Currie	Chief Justice of the Wisconsin Supreme Court; January 1, 1868 – August 1, 1974	Succeeded by Horace W. Wilkie
