= 1959 Wisconsin Supreme Court election =

- April 7, 1959

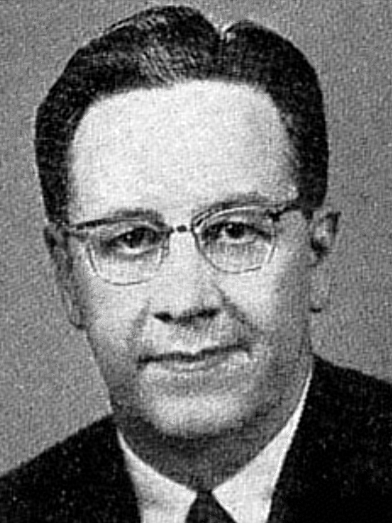
| Candidate | E. Harold Hallows | Stewart G. Honeck |
| Popular vote | 326,510 | 310,168 |
| Percentage | 51.28% | 48.72% |
Justice before election
E. Harold Hallows
Elected Justice
E. Harold Hallows

The 1959 Wisconsin Supreme Court election was held on Tuesday, April 7, 1959, to elect a justice to a full ten-year seat the Wisconsin Supreme Court. The general election was preceded by a nonpartisan primary held on March, from which E. Harold Hallows (the incumbent justice, who had been appointed in 1958 to fill a vacancy) and Stewart G. Honeck (former state attorney general) advanced from a field of eight candidates. Hallows was re-elected, defeating Honeck in the general election.

== Scheduling ==
Hallows was appointed in 1958 to fill a vacancy.

The Constitution of Wisconsin stipulates that early elections full terms can be triggered by a vacancy. The constitution stipulates that it is impermissible for more than one seat to be up for election in the same year. Elections must be moved to an earlier year after a vacancy, but only if there is a more immediate year without a scheduled contest. All supreme court elections are held during the spring elections in early April. While the previous election to this seat had been in 1954, which meant it normally would not have needed another election until 1964, the vacancy changed this. Since there were was no supreme court election scheduled in 1959, the election was shifted to then.

== Candidates ==
1959 portrait photograph of Hallows

Advanced to general election

- E. Harold Hallows, incumbent justice
- Stewart G. Honeck, former attorney general of Wisconsin

Eliminated in primary

- Christ Alexopoulos, attorney
- Bruno V. Bitker
- William S. Clark
- Willis E. Donley, attorney and former member of the Wisconsin State Assembly
- Harry Halloway, attorney
- John E. Krueger

== Results ==
1959 Wisconsin Supreme Court election
| Party | Candidate | Votes | % |
|---|---|---|---|
Nonpartisan primary (March 10, 1959)
| Nonpartisan | E. Harold Hallows (incumbent) | 61,697 | 27.55 |
| Nonpartisan | Stewart G. Honeck | 42,381 | 18.93 |
| Nonpartisan | Bruno V. Bitker | 39,297 | 17.55 |
| Nonpartisan | Willis E. Donley | 21,807 | 9.74 |
| Nonpartisan | Harry Halloway | 20,631 | 9.21 |
| Nonpartisan | John E. Krueger | 18,975 | 8.47 |
| Nonpartisan | William S. Clark | 14,380 | 6.42 |
| Nonpartisan | Christ Alexopoulos | 4,747 | 2.12 |
| Total votes | | 223,915 | 100 |
General election (April 7, 1959)
| Nonpartisan | E. Harold Hallows (incumbent) | 326,510 | 51.28 |
| Nonpartisan | Stewart G. Honeck | 310,168 | 48.72 |
| Majority | | 16,342 | 2.57 |
| Total votes | | 636,678 | 100 |
