= Charles Reynolds (legislator) =

American politician (1839–1914)

Member of the Wisconsin State Assembly from the Door County district
- In office January 5, 1903 – January 7, 1907
- Preceded by: Henry J. Overbeck
- Succeeded by: Thomas Reynolds

Personal details
- Born: November 15, 1839 County Longford, Ireland, UK
- Died: February 2, 1914 (aged 74) Biloxi, Mississippi, U.S.
- Resting place: Calvary Cemetery, Milwaukee, Wisconsin
- Party: Republican
- Spouse: Mary Mahan (m. 1870–1914)
- Children: Michael Lawrence Reynolds^{(b. 1871; died 1892)}; Charles Reynolds^{(b. 1888; died 1893)}; Ruth Reynolds^{(b. 1889; died 1893)}; Mary Reynolds^{(b. 1890; died 1893)}; Dwight Reynolds^{(died young)}
- Parents: Michael Reynolds (father); Mary Ann (McCann) Reynolds (mother)
- Relatives: Thomas Reynolds (brother); John W. Reynolds Sr. (nephew); John W. Reynolds Jr. (grand-nephew); Asa Mahan (father-in-law)

Military service
- Allegiance: United States
- Branch/service: United States Volunteers; Union Army
- Years of service: 1861–1865
- Rank: Captain, USV
- Unit: 12th Reg. Wis. Vol. Infantry
- Battles/wars: American Civil War

Charles Reynolds (November 15, 1839 – February 2, 1914) was an Irish American immigrant, businessman, and Republican politician. He was a member of the Wisconsin State Assembly, representing Door County during the 1903 and 1905 sessions.

== Early life and Civil War service ==
Reynolds was born on November 15, 1839, in County Longford, Ireland. He was raised and educated in Ireland, and emigrated to the United States in 1860, following his brother, John, to Madison, Wisconsin.

The American Civil War broke out shortly after his arrival in Wisconsin. He was among some of the earliest volunteers for the Union Army, joining up with a company that would become Company A of the 12th Wisconsin Infantry Regiment. As the 12th Wisconsin Infantry was being organized, Reynolds was selected to serve as sergeant major of the regiment.

The 12th Wisconsin Infantry mustered into federal service in October 1861 and was sent south for service in the western theater of the war. The regiment spent much of 1862 and 1863 guarding railroad lines in Kansas, Tennessee, and northern Mississippi. Reynolds was commissioned as a second lieutenant and transferred back to Company A in March 1862, and was then promoted to first lieutenant in April 1863.

With his regiment, he participated in the Siege of Vicksburg, the Meridian campaign, and the Atlanta campaign through the latter half of 1863 and 1864. After Atlanta, his captain resigned and Reynolds was promoted to captain of Company A. They then joined Sherman's March to the Sea and his subsequent Carolinas campaign. In the Spring of 1865, he was detailed to the brigade staff of general Charles Ewing as an assistant adjutant general, where he remained until the end of the war.

== Career ==
After returning to Wisconsin, Reynolds became involved in real estate and bought out a bankrupt property previously owned by his brother, John, in Jacksonport, Wisconsin. Under Charles Reynolds' management, the Jacksonport property prospered and drew in new settlers and commerce. Reynolds employed a large population of laborers for lumbering and sold the products around the region. In Door County, he became involved in politics and was elected to the Wisconsin State Assembly in 1902 and 1904. He did not run for re-election in 1906 and was succeeded by his brother, Thomas Reynolds.

After leaving the Assembly, he became involved with the Merchants Exchange Bank, and was vice president of the bank before his death. He spent the Winter of 1913–1914 in Biloxi, Mississippi, and died there on February 2, 1914.

== Personal life and family ==
Charles Reynolds was one of nine children born to Irish farmers Michael and Mary Ann (née McCann) Reynolds. His mother died when he was a child. Charles' older brother, John, was the first to come to America, followed by Charles in 1860, and then by his brother Michael in 1864. His younger brother Thomas and their sister Katherine came to America in 1866, followed finally, by their father and remaining siblings in 1867.

His brother, Thomas, also ended up in Door County and prospered there as a farmer. He also served two terms in the Wisconsin State Assembly. Thomas' son was John W. Reynolds Sr., the 26th attorney general of Wisconsin, and his grandson was John W. Reynolds Jr., a federal judge and the 36th governor of Wisconsin.

Charles Reynolds married Mary Mahan on April 9, 1870. Mary was a daughter of Asa Mahan, a Congregational minister who served as the first president of Oberlin College, and served as president of two other colleges. Charles and Mary had five children, though four of them died in childhood, and their last child died at age 21.

Wisconsin State Assembly
Preceded by Henry J. Overbeck	Member of the Wisconsin State Assembly from the Door County district January 5, 1903 – January 7, 1907	Succeeded by Thomas Reynolds
