= Jacksonport =

Jacksonport may refer to:

== Places ==
United States

- Jacksonport, Arkansas, a town
- Jacksonport, Wisconsin, a town
  - Jacksonport (community), Wisconsin, an unincorporated community
  - West Jacksonport, Wisconsin, an unincorporated community
