= 1940 United States Senate election in Wisconsin =

- November 5, 1940
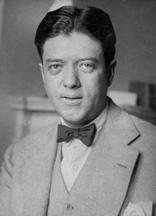

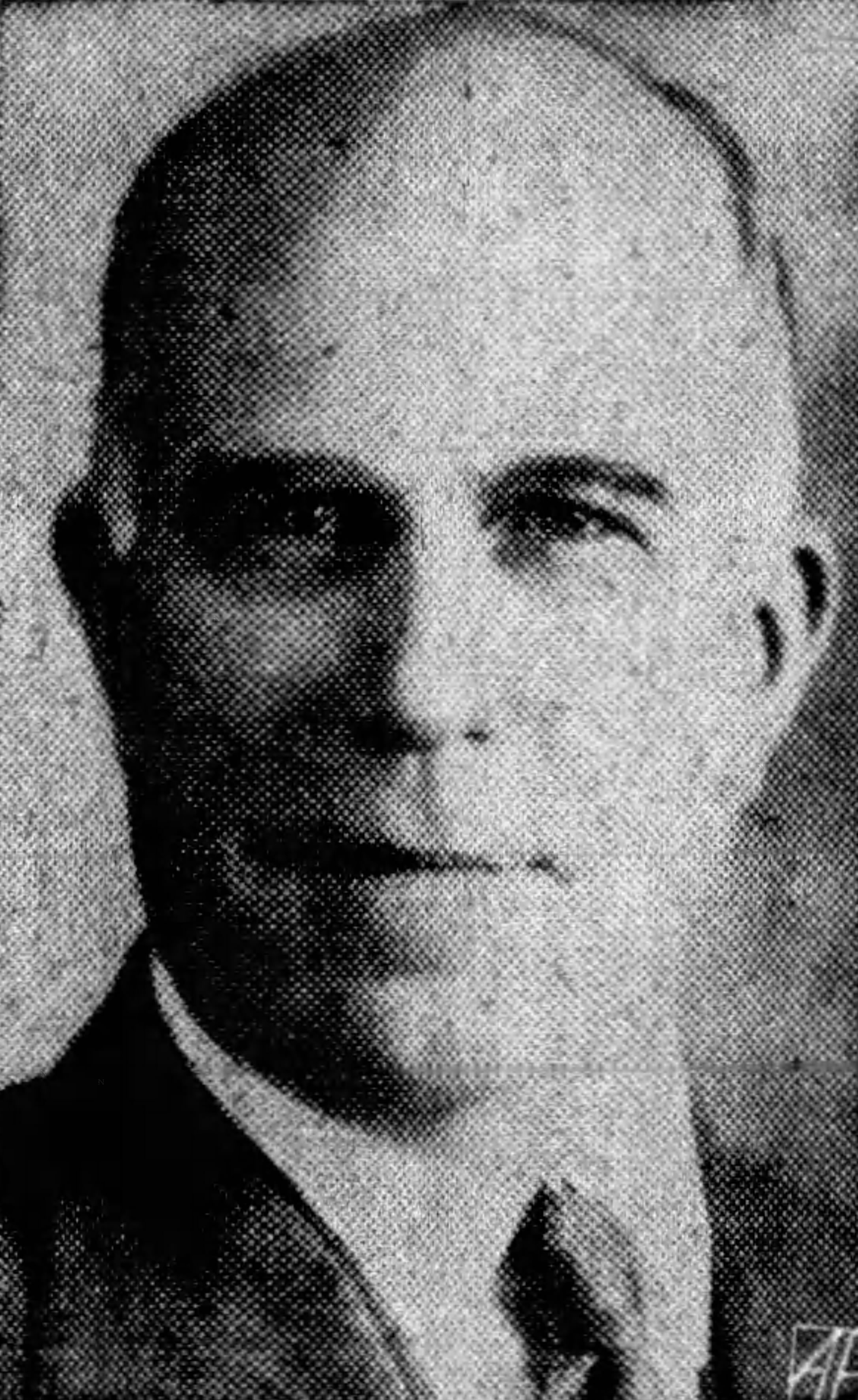

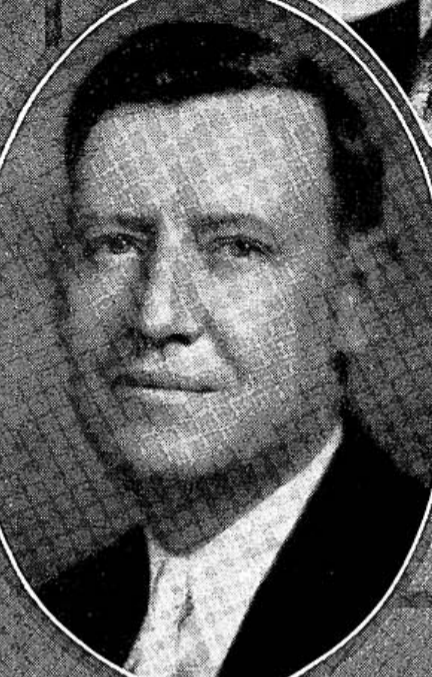
Nominee	Robert La Follette Jr.	Fred H. Clausen	James E. Finnegan
Party	Progressive	Republican	Democratic
Popular vote	605,609	553,692	176,688
Percentage	45.26%	41.38%	13.20%
- County results La Follete Jr.: 40–50% 50–60% 60–70% Clausen: 40–50% 50–60% 60–70%
U.S. senator before election
Robert La Follette Jr.
Progressive
Elected U.S. Senator
Robert La Follette Jr.
Progressive

The 1940 United States Senate election in Wisconsin was held on November 5, 1940.

Incumbent Progressive U.S. Senator Robert La Follette Jr. was elected to a third term in office over Republican Fred H. Clausen and Democrat James E. Finnegan.

== Progressive primary ==
=== Candidates ===
- Robert M. La Follette Jr., incumbent Senator since 1925

=== Results ===
1940 Progressive U.S. Senate primary
Party	Candidate	Votes	%
Progressive	Robert M. La Follette Jr. (incumbent)	144,692	100.00%
Total votes		144,692	100.00%

== Democratic primary ==
=== Candidates ===
==== Nominee ====
- James E. Finnegan, former Wisconsin Attorney General (1933–1937)

==== Eliminated in primary ====
- William D. Carroll, former State Senator (1933–1937)
- John Cudahy, former U.S. Ambassador to Poland, Luxembourg, Belgium, and the Irish Free State (write-in)
- James J. Kerwin

=== Results ===
1940 Democratic U.S. Senate primary
Party	Candidate	Votes	%
Democratic	James E. Finnegan	55,145	42.79%
Democratic	William D. Carroll	36,306	28.17%
Democratic	James J. Kerwin	22,642	17.57%
Democratic	John Cudahy (write-in)	14,773	11.46%
Total votes		128,866	100.00%

== Republican primary ==
=== Candidates ===
==== Nominee ====
- Fred H. Clausen, farming equipment manufacturer

==== Eliminated in primary ====
- Walter B. Chilsen, former State Assemblyman (1919–1921) and editor of the Merrill Daily Herald
- Michael G. Eberlein
- Glenn Frank, former President of the University of Wisconsin-Madison (deceased, remained on ballot)
- John P. Koehler, Health Commissioner of Milwaukee
- William C. Maas
- Reuben W. Peterson, former State Assemblyman (1937–1939)

==== Declined ====
- Frank Bateman Keefe, U.S. Representative from Wisconsin's 6th congressional district (1939–1951)

=== Results ===
1940 Republican U.S. Senate primary
Party	Candidate	Votes	%
Republican	Fred H. Clausen	109,293	31.23%
Republican	John P. Koehler	64,774	18.51%
Republican	Glenn Frank (deceased)	47,885	13.68%
Republican	Michael G. Eberlein	43,784	12.51%
Republican	William C. Maas	29,940	8.56%
Republican	Reuben W. Peterson	29,331	8.38%
Republican	Walter B. Chilsen	24,928	7.12%
Total votes		349,935	100.00%

== General election ==
=== Candidates ===
- Fred H. Clausen, farming equipment manufacturer (Republican)
- James E. Finnegan, former Wisconsin Attorney General (Democratic)
- Ted Furman (Communist)
- Robert M. La Follette Jr., incumbent Senator since 1925 (Progressive)
- Adolf Wiggert (Socialist Labor)

=== Results ===
1940 U.S. Senate election in Wisconsin
Party	Candidate	Votes	%	±%
Progressive	Robert M. La Follette Jr. (incumbent)	605,609	45.26%	▼2.52
Republican	Fred H. Clausen	553,692	41.38%	▲18.54
Democratic	James E. Finnegan	176,688	13.20%	▼11.04
Communist	Ted Furman	1,308	0.10%	N/A
Socialist Labor	Adolf Wiggert	838	0.06%	N/A
Total votes		1,538,135	100.00%	
Progressive hold				

== See also ==
- 1940 United States Senate elections
