= 1931 Wisconsin Supreme Court election =

- April 7, 1931
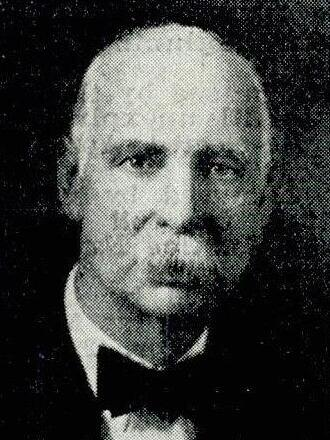

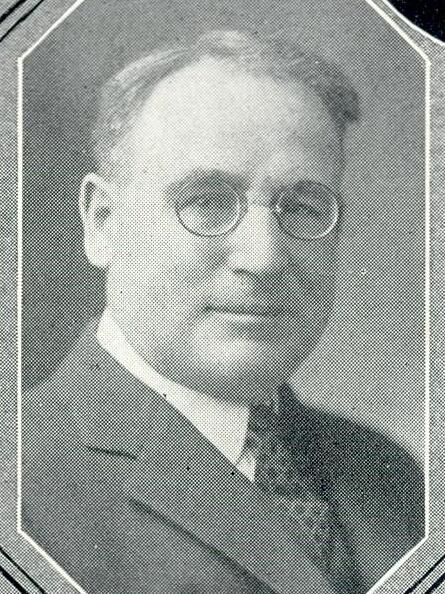

Candidate	Chester A. Fowler	John W. Reynolds Sr.	George L. Mensing
Popular vote	254,534	230,902	57,590
Percentage	46.87%	42.52%	10.61%
- Fowler: 40–50% 50–60% 60–70% 70–80% 80–90% Reynolds: 40–50% 50–60% 60–70% 70–80% Tie: 40–50%
Justice before election
Chester A. Fowler
Elected Justice
Chester A. Fowler

The 1931 Wisconsin Supreme Court election was held on Tuesday, April 7, 1931, to elect a justice to a full ten-year seat the Wisconsin Supreme Court. Incumbent justice Chester A. Fowler won re-election, defeating two challengers. His strongest challenger was John W. Reynolds Sr., the state's attorney general who had unsuccessfully challenged Fowler the previous year in a special election for the same seat on the court.

== Background ==
At the time, the court had a conservative ideological majority. Incumbent justice Chester A. Fowler had been one of five judges appointed by Governor Walter J. Kohler Sr. (himself a conservative member of the Republican Party) that had created this majority. Fowler had survived a special election the previous year, in which John W. Reynolds Sr. was one of his opponents. However, in order to retain his seat for a further ten-year term, he needed to win election again in 1931.

The election coincided with a statewide ballot measure, a legislatively referred vote on whether driver's licenses should be issued through county clerks rather than through a state agency. It also coincided with nonpartisan local and sub-unit elections, including various lower court judicial races and mayoral elections.

== Candidates ==
- Chester A. Fowler, incumbent justice since 1929
- George L. Mensing
- John W. Reynolds Sr., Wisconsin attorney general, unsuccessful candidate in the 1930 special election

=== Ideologic leanings and political affiliations of candidates ===
Fowler was a conservative member of the Republican Party. Reynolds was an ideological liberal, being a progressive member of the Republican Party aligned with the school of thought that had been championed in Wisconsin by Robert M. La Follette. Mensing was a Milwaukee-based member of the Socialist Party.

== Campaign ==
Fowler argued that he was an experienced and capable jurist, it would be unwise for voters to oust him from the court. Reynolds promised that, if elected, he would shift the court's ideological lean in a liberal direction. Mensing centered his campaign on the balance of power in state government, arguing that the court had assumed too much power and had acted against the popular will of the people.

Due to Reynolds having contested the previous judicial election a year earlier, as well as having won re-election as attorney general in November 1930 election, the 1931 judicial election was the third statewide race that Reynolds had run in a year's span.

== Results ==
1931 Wisconsin Supreme Court election
Party	Candidate	Votes	%	±%
General election (April 7, 1931)
Nonpartisan	Chester A. Fowler (incumbent)	254,534	46.87	+5.52%
Nonpartisan	John W. Reynolds Sr.	230,902	42.52	+4.14%
Nonpartisan	George L. Mensing	57,590	10.61	
Plurality		23,632	4.35	+1.38%
Total votes		543,026	100.0	+13.08%
