= John W. Reynolds Sr. =

American lawyer and politician (1876–1958)

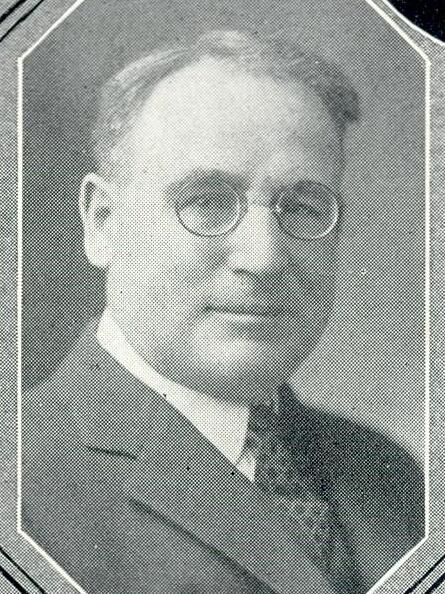

26th Attorney General of Wisconsin
- In office January 3, 1927 – January 2, 1933
- Governor: Fred R. Zimmerman; Walter J. Kohler Sr.; Philip La Follette
- Preceded by: Herman L. Ekern
- Succeeded by: James E. Finnegan

District Attorney of Brown County, Wisconsin
- In office January 1, 1907 – January 1, 1911
- Preceded by: John A. Kittell
- Succeeded by: Morton E. Davis

Personal details
- Born: John Whitcome Reynolds; October 1, 1876 Jacksonport, Wisconsin, U.S.
- Died: February 4, 1958 (aged 81) Green Bay, Wisconsin, U.S.
- Resting place: Allouez Catholic Cemetery And Chapel Mausoleum, Green Bay
- Party: Republican
- Spouses: Madge Flately (m. 1906; died 1937); Florence Frances Clarke (m. 1939–1958)
- Children: John W. Reynolds Jr.^{(b. 1921; died 2002)}
- Parents: Thomas Reynolds (father); Jennie (Foley) Reynolds (mother)
- Relatives: Charles Reynolds (uncle)

John Whitcome Reynolds Sr. (October 1, 1876 – February 4, 1958) was an American lawyer and progressive Republican politician from northeast Wisconsin. He was the 26th attorney general of Wisconsin, serving from 1927 to 1933; while serving as attorney general, he was an unsuccessful candidate for Wisconsin Supreme Court in the 1930 and 1931. Earlier in his career, he served as district attorney of Brown County, Wisconsin, and was chairman of the Brown County Republican Party.

Reynolds had several notable relatives. His father and uncle, Thomas and Charles Reynolds, served in the Wisconsin State Assembly; his son John W. Reynolds Jr. became the 34th attorney general of Wisconsin, 36th governor of Wisconsin, and a federal district court judge.

== Early life ==
John W. Reynolds was born on his family's farm in Jacksonport, in Door County, Wisconsin, the son of Jennie (Foley) and Thomas Reynolds. After completing his primary education, he taught school for several years in Door County, then worked as a traveling book salesman throughout northeast Wisconsin while saving money for college. He continued to work as a traveling book salesman in the summers while attending the University of Michigan. He later claimed that his sales trips took him to nearly every farm in Kewaunee, Manitowoc, Columbia, northern Outagamie, and southern Shawano counties.

He first heard a speech from then-former U.S. representative Robert M. "Fighting Bob" La Follette in 1898, while at school in Ann Arbor, Michigan, while he was advocating for the implementation of primary elections to replace the old conventional nominating system. After completing his college studies, Reynolds immediately entered the University of Wisconsin Law School, finishing his education in 1902. He was admitted to the bar and worked briefly at a law practice in Ashland, Wisconsin, before returning to Green Bay and partnering with Robert A. Kaftan—a friend he met at while attending the University of Wisconsin Law School who would be his partner on and off for the next 20 years. Green Bay remained Reynolds' home for the rest of his life.

== Political career ==
Reynolds began actively participating in politics in 1904, when he gave speeches in favor of the re-election of then-governor Robert La Follette, who by then was also the leader of the progressive faction in the Republican Party of Wisconsin.

In 1906, Reynolds made his first run for elected office, running for Brown County district attorney on the Republican Party ticket. He faced a crowded primary but prevailed, and went on to win the general election; he was re-elected in 1908. In 1910, Reynolds was accused of taking improper fees as district attorney. After an investigation, the county board exonerated him, finding that the fees were legitimately collected. Nevertheless, Reynolds lost his bid for re-nomination in 1910.

Reynolds increased his political activity after leaving office, and, in 1912, he was elected chairman of the Brown County Republican Party.

Wisconsin's 9th congressional district 1912–1931

In 1914, he entered the race for U.S. House of Representatives in Wisconsin's 9th congressional district, which then comprised roughly the northeast quadrant of the state. As the lone progressive in the Republican primary, Reynolds defeated his two conservative opponents. Despite a strong national environment for the Republican Party, however, Reynolds fell short of Democratic incumbent Thomas F. Konop in the general election, receiving just 44% of the vote.

There was an effort by Wisconsin Republicans to persuade Reynolds to run again in 1916, but he declined. In the fall, Reynolds received an in-person visit from Senator La Follette during a Reynolds family vacation in Door County, as La Follette was contemplating a break with the Republican Party over the nomination of Charles Evans Hughes for president.

Over the next several years, Reynolds focused on his legal practice; during those years, he served as defense counsel in several high profile criminal trials, including appearances before the Wisconsin Supreme Court. But Reynolds remained involved in civic and political affairs, serving as chairman of the county Red Cross during the American involvement in World War I, and holding public speeches and debates arguing against the United States joining the League of Nations.

In the 1920s, Reynolds began resuming more active political engagement, and was elected to another term as chairman of the Brown County Republicans. In 1924, he was elected a delegate to the 1924 Republican National Convention, supporting the presidential ambitions of Wisconsin's U.S. senator Robert La Follette. When the Republicans instead re-nominated Calvin Coolidge, Reynolds joined La Follette's 3rd party presidential campaign on the Progressive ticket. Reynolds was named to La Follette's slate of presidential electors in Wisconsin, and since La Follette won the state of Wisconsin in the general election, Reynolds was able to cast his vote for La Follette in the 1924 electoral college. When Senator La Follette died the following year, Reynolds was selected as an honorary pallbearer at the funeral.

=== Attorney general terms (1926–1931) ===
In April 1926, Reynolds announced that he would seek the Republican Party nomination for attorney general of Wisconsin, running as a progressive and touting his years of friendship with La Follette. Reynolds faced two opponents in the Republican primary, Albert Twesme and George M. Sheldon, but prevailed by a wide margin, receiving a true majority of all the votes cast. Reynolds' would-be Democratic opponent, David Gardner Jr., was disqualified from the receiving the official Democratic Party nomination because he failed to secure enough votes in the primary election—he faced no opponent in the primary and fell about 50 votes short of the 15,725 vote threshold. Gardner did then run as an independent Democrat, but was unable to mount a serious campaign. Reynolds cruised to election with more than 85% of the vote.

An early flash-point in Reynolds' term as attorney general occurred over his attempt to appoint his predecessor, Herman Ekern, to continue representing the state in a lawsuit to prevent the city of Chicago from diverting a large amount of Lake Michigan water for sanitation. In addition to having served as attorney general, Ekern had been the progressive candidate for governor of Wisconsin in 1926, but lost the Republican nomination to Fred R. Zimmerman. Zimmerman refused to authorize payment for Ekern to serve as special counsel; Ekern ultimately volunteered to serve without pay, and Reynolds accepted.

Reynolds was also drawn into an early feud between Zimmerman and the state adjutant general, Ralph Immell—another progressive political operative who had been appointed by the previous progressive governor. Zimmerman attempted to find a rationale to remove Immell from office, and sought a legal opinion from Reynolds on whether Immell held the legal qualifications for the office of adjutant general. Reynolds' opinion endorsed Immell's qualifications, and all but ended the attempts to remove him from office.

In the midst of Prohibition in the United States, Reynolds also used his office to offer the legal opinion that alcohol was fully legal in the privacy of the home, as long as the home was not being used as a business. His office further opined that wine and beer were exempt from prohibitions on possessing "intoxicating liquor" in public. These opinions were well received in Wisconsin, where prohibition was already extremely unpopular.

Reynolds faced competitive Republican primaries in both of his re-election campaigns, but prevailed by a comfortable margin in both elections. General elections were less competitive, and Reynolds secured more than two thirds of the general election vote in both of his re-election campaigns.

During his second term as attorney general, a vacancy occurred on the Wisconsin Supreme Court due to the death of Chief Justice Aad J. Vinje. The conservative governor, Walter J. Kohler Sr., quickly appointed veteran circuit court judge Chester A. Fowler to hold the seat on an interim basis. Reynolds almost immediately announced that he would challenge Fowler in the 1930 special election to fill the remainder of the term. Reynolds' candidacy was not initially well-received by progressive leaders in the state, who had been preparing for Herman Ekern to run in this election against Fowler. Ekern ultimately bowed out and the progressive organization grudgingly coalesced around Reynolds.

Reynolds path to the Supreme Court was further complicated by the entrance of populist lawyer Raymond J. Cannon, a former professional baseball player who had made a name as a lawyer representing players in the Black Sox Scandal and had then been part of an effort to organize a baseball players union; just months before declaring his candidacy, Cannon had been disbarred in Wisconsin for unethical client solicitation tactics. Cannon ultimately drew 20% of the vote in the April 1930 election, and Reynolds fell 14,000 votes short of unseating Fowler.

Reynolds challenged Fowler again in the regular Supreme Court election in 1931, but lost again by a similar margin.

== Later years ==
Reynolds refused to run for a fourth term as attorney general in 1932, and returned to his law practice in Green Bay. He founded a new legal partnership with his son, John Jr.

He continued practicing law nearly up to the day of his death. He died at his home in Green Bay, on February 4, 1958, after a brief illness; at the time of his death, he was the oldest active member of the Brown County bar.

== Personal life and family ==
John Reynolds Sr. was one of at 10 children born to Irish American immigrant Thomas Reynolds (1839–1919) and his first-generation Irish American wife, Jane (née Foley; 1852–1922). Thomas Reynolds and his brother, Charles Reynolds, both served in the Wisconsin State Assembly in the early 20th century.

John Reynolds Sr. married twice. His first wife was Madge Flatley, another child of Irish immigrants; they married in Wisconsin in 1906 and had four children before Madge's death in 1937. Two years later, Reynolds married the widow Florence Frances Stehn (née Clarke), and became stepfather to her children.

John Reynolds' youngest biological child was John W. Reynolds Jr., who followed his father into the legal and political professions, serving as the 34th attorney general of Wisconsin, the 36th governor of Wisconsin, then serving the last 38 years of his life as a United States district judge.

== Electoral history ==
=== Wisconsin attorney general (1926, 1928, 1930) ===
Year	Election	Date	Elected				Defeated				Total	Plurality
1926	Primary	Sep. 7	John W. Reynolds	Republican	201,342	53.57%	George M. Sheldon	Rep.	96,697	25.73%	375,853	104,645
1926	Primary	Sep. 7	John W. Reynolds	Republican	201,342	53.57%	Albert T. Twesme	Rep.	77,814	20.70%	375,853	104,645
1926	General	Nov. 2	John W. Reynolds	Republican	389,519	85.53%	Ben W. Reynolds	Soc.	35,066	7.70%	455,404	354,453
1926	General	Nov. 2	John W. Reynolds	Republican	389,519	85.53%	David Gardner Jr.	Ind.D.	18,888	4.15%	455,404	354,453
1926	General	Nov. 2	John W. Reynolds	Republican	389,519	85.53%	Burton S. Hawley	Proh.	11,931	2.62%	455,404	354,453
1928	Primary	Sep. 4	John W. Reynolds (inc)	Republican	221,540	52.05%	Edward L. Kelley	Rep.	118,746	27.90%	425,634	102,794
1928	Primary	Sep. 4	John W. Reynolds (inc)	Republican	221,540	52.05%	George M. Sheldon	Rep.	85,254	20.03%	425,634	102,794
1928	General	Nov. 6	John W. Reynolds (inc)	Republican	598,730	68.29%	John J. Boyle	Dem.	234,779	26.78%	876,792	363,951
1928	General	Nov. 6	John W. Reynolds (inc)	Republican	598,730	68.29%	George Mensing	Soc.	36,028	4.11%	876,792	363,951
1928	General	Nov. 6	John W. Reynolds (inc)	Republican	598,730	68.29%	Burton S. Hawley	Proh.	7,244	0.83%	876,792	363,951
1930	Primary	Sep. 16	John W. Reynolds (inc)	Republican	258,469	45.55%	Michael Eberlein	Rep.	175,147	30.86%	567,469	83,322
1930	Primary	Sep. 16	John W. Reynolds (inc)	Republican	258,469	45.55%	Alvin C. Reis	Rep.	133,739	23.57%	567,469	83,322
1930	General	Nov. 4	John W. Reynolds (inc)	Republican	375,616	68.09%	John J. Boyle	Dem.	125,315	22.72%	551,608	250,301
1930	General	Nov. 4	John W. Reynolds (inc)	Republican	375,616	68.09%	Glenn P. Turner	Soc.	35,169	6.38%	551,608	250,301
1930	General	Nov. 4	John W. Reynolds (inc)	Republican	375,616	68.09%	Burton S. Hawley	Proh.	12,636	2.29%	551,608	250,301
1930	General	Nov. 4	John W. Reynolds (inc)	Republican	375,616	68.09%	William Martilla	Com.	2,827	0.51%	551,608	250,301

=== Wisconsin Supreme Court (1930, 1931) ===
1930 Wisconsin Supreme Court special election
Party	Candidate	Votes	%	±%
General Election, April 1, 1930
Nonpartisan	Chester A. Fowler (incumbent)	198,572	41.39%	
Nonpartisan	John W. Reynolds	184,317	38.42%	
Nonpartisan	Raymond J. Cannon	96,908	20.20%	
	Scattering	433	0.09%	
Plurality		14,255	2.97%	
Total votes		480,230	100.0%	

1931 Wisconsin Supreme Court election
Party	Candidate	Votes	%	±%
General Election, April 7, 1931
Nonpartisan	Chester A. Fowler (incumbent)	254,534	46.87%	+5.52pp
Nonpartisan	John W. Reynolds	230,902	42.52%	+4.14pp
Nonpartisan	George L. Mensing	57,590	10.61%	
Plurality		23,632	4.35%	+1.38pp
Total votes		543,026	100.0%	+13.08%

Party political offices
Preceded by Herman Ekern	Republican nominee for Attorney General of Wisconsin; 1926, 1928, 1930	Succeeded by Levi H. Bancroft
Legal offices
Preceded by John A. Kittell	District Attorney of Brown County, Wisconsin; 1907 – 1911	Succeeded by Morton E. Davis
Preceded by Herman L. Ekern	Attorney General of Wisconsin; 1927 – 1933	Succeeded by James E. Finnegan
