= 1941 Wisconsin Supreme Court election =

- April 1, 1941
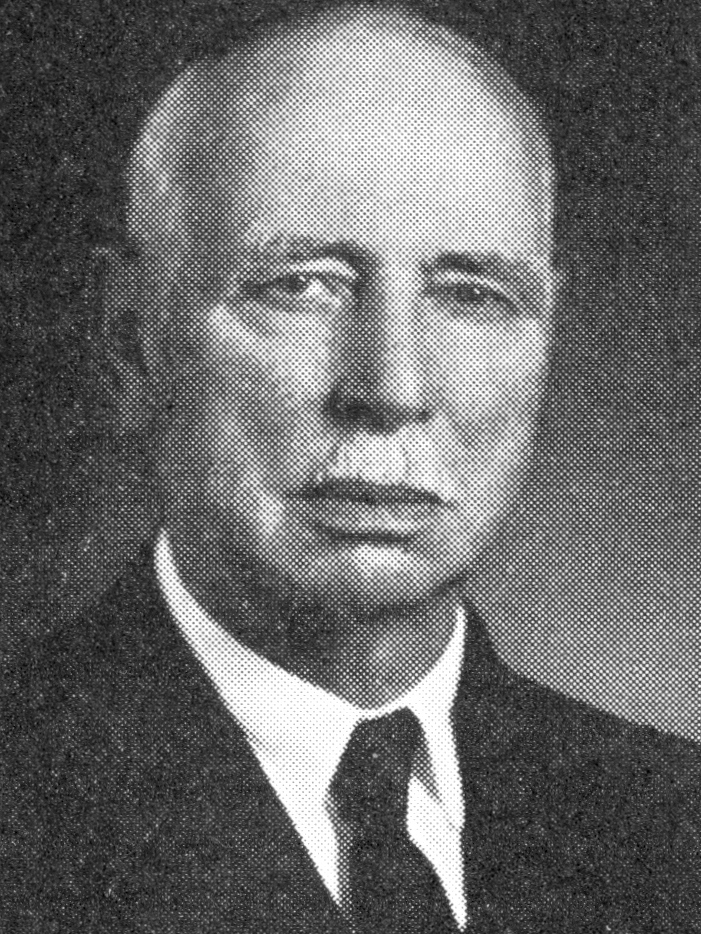

Candidate	Chester A. Fowler	Alvin C. Reis
Popular vote	290,276	238,562
Percentage	54.89%	45.11%
- Fowler: 50–60% 60–70% 70–80% Reis: 50–60% 60–70%
Justice before election
Chester A. Fowler
Elected Justice
Chester A. Fowler

The 1941 Wisconsin Supreme Court election was held on Tuesday, April 1, 1941, to elect a justice to a full ten-year seat the Wisconsin Supreme Court. Incumbent justice Chester A. Fowler won re-election, defeating a challenge from Alvin C. Reis (a circuit court judge and former state legislator)

== Results ==
1941 Wisconsin Supreme Court election
Party	Candidate	Votes	%	±%
General Election, April 1, 1941
Nonpartisan	Chester A. Fowler (incumbent)	290,276	54.89%	+8.02%
Nonpartisan	Alvin C. Reis	238,562	45.11%	
Plurality		51,714	9.78%	+5.43%
Total votes		528,838	100.0%	-2.61%
