= Gratiot, Wisconsin =

- Village
- Location of Gratiot in Lafayette County, Wisconsin.
- Coordinates: 42°34′5″N 90°2′29″W
- Country: United States
- State: Wisconsin
- County: Lafayette

Area
  - Total: 0.55 sq mi (1.42 km^{2})
  - Land: 0.55 sq mi (1.42 km^{2})
  - Water: 0 sq mi (0.00 km^{2})
- Elevation: 823 ft (251 m)

Population (2020)
  - Total: 224
  - Density: 409/sq mi (158/km^{2})
- Time zone: UTC-6 (Central (CST))
  - Summer (DST): UTC-5 (CDT)
- Area code: 608
- FIPS code: 55-30600
- GNIS feature ID: 1565778
- Website: www.gratiot.us

Gratiot is a village in Lafayette County, Wisconsin, United States. The population was 224 at the 2020 census. The village is surrounded by the Town of Gratiot.

== History ==
The village was named after Henry Gratiot, a French-American trader and Indian Agent. The post office was opened in the community by the first postmaster, Fortunatus Berry, in July 1834.

== Geography ==
Gratiot is located at 42°34′37″N 90°1′20″W (42.576947, -90.02234).

According to the United States Census Bureau, the village has a total area of 0.59 square miles (1.53 km^{2}), all land.

== Demographics ==
Historical population
Census	Pop.	Note	%±
1880	191		—
1900	335		—
1910	368		9.9%
1920	338		−8.2%
1930	287		−15.1%
1940	297		3.5%
1950	323		8.8%
1960	294		−9.0%
1970	249		−15.3%
1980	280		12.4%
1990	207		−26.1%
2000	252		21.7%
2010	236		−6.3%
2020	224		−5.1%
U.S. Decennial Census

=== 2010 census ===
As of the census of 2010, there were 236 people, 97 households, and 64 families living in the village. The population density was 400.0 inhabitants per square mile (154.4/km^{2}). There were 108 housing units at an average density of 183.1 per square mile (70.7/km^{2}). The racial makeup of the village was 97.9% White, 0.4% Asian, and 1.7% from two or more races.

There were 97 households, of which 32.0% had children under the age of 18 living with them, 47.4% were married couples living together, 14.4% had a female householder with no husband present, 4.1% had a male householder with no wife present, and 34.0% were non-families. 26.8% of all households were made up of individuals, and 14.4% had someone living alone who was 65 years of age or older. The average household size was 2.43 and the average family size was 2.91.

The median age in the village was 41.3 years. 24.2% of residents were under the age of 18; 11% were between the ages of 18 and 24; 22.1% were from 25 to 44; 24.7% were from 45 to 64; and 18.2% were 65 years of age or older. The gender makeup of the village was 53.8% male and 46.2% female.

=== 2000 census ===
As of the census of 2000, there were 252 people, 97 households, and 71 families living in the village. The population density was 432.6 people per square mile (167.8/km^{2}). There were 103 housing units at an average density of 176.8 per square mile (68.6/km^{2}). The racial makeup of the village was 99.21% White, 0.40% Black or African American, and 0.40% from two or more races. 0.00% of the population were Hispanic or Latino of any race.

There were 97 households, out of which 32.0% had children under the age of 18 living with them, 54.6% were married couples living together, 15.5% had a female householder with no husband present, and 25.8% were non-families. 23.7% of all households were made up of individuals, and 15.5% had someone living alone who was 65 years of age or older. The average household size was 2.60 and the average family size was 2.97.

In the village, the population was spread out, with 28.6% under the age of 18, 7.5% from 18 to 24, 28.6% from 25 to 44, 21.8% from 45 to 64, and 13.5% who were 65 years of age or older. The median age was 38 years. For every 100 females, there were 104.9 males. For every 100 females age 18 and over, there were 89.5 males.

The median income for a household in the village was $41,944, and the median income for a family was $45,208. Males had a median income of $28,625 versus $20,125 for females. The per capita income for the village was $16,902. About 5.2% of families and 9.2% of the population were below the poverty line, including 8.1% of those under the age of eighteen and 14.6% of those 65 or over.

== Recreation ==
The Cheese Country Trail passes through the village.

== Notable natives ==
- John J. Boyle, U.S. Attorney, was born in Gratiot.
- Willis C. Cook, U.S. diplomat, was born in Gratiot.
- Abner Dalrymple, baseball outfielder, was born in Gratiot.
