= Chester A. Fowler =

20th century American judge

The Honorable Chester A. Fowler
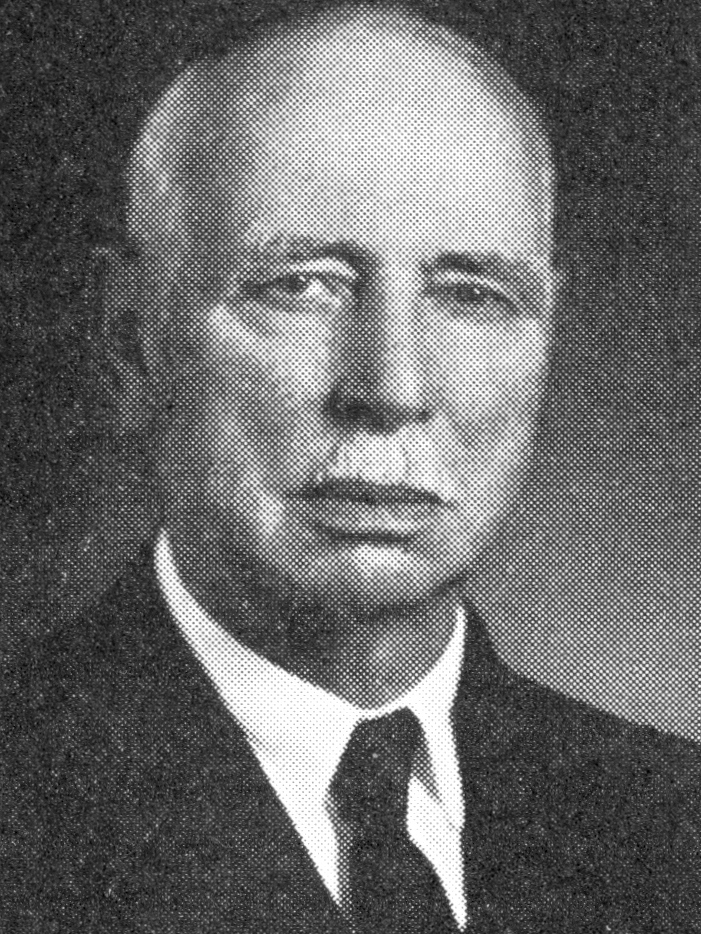
- Fowler circa 1940

Justice of the Wisconsin Supreme Court
- In office December 1929 – April 8, 1948
- Appointed by: Walter J. Kohler Sr.
- Preceded by: Aad J. Vinje
- Succeeded by: John E. Martin

Wisconsin Circuit Court Judge for the 18th Circuit
- In office January 1, 1905 – December 1929
- Preceded by: Position established
- Succeeded by: Clayton F. Van Pelt

Personal details
- Born: Chester Almeron Fowler; December 24, 1862 Rubicon, Wisconsin, U.S.
- Died: April 8, 1948 (aged 85) Madison, Wisconsin, U.S.
- Resting place: Forest Hill Cemetery; Madison, Wisconsin
- Spouses: Carrie J. Smith; (m. 1892; died 1946)
- Children: Mary (Boynton)^{(b. 1893; died 1964)}; Dwight Fowler^{(b. 1894; died 1981)}
- Parents: Franklin Dwight Fowler (father); Maria Antoinette (Cole) Fowler (mother)
- Education: University of Wisconsin

Chester Almeron Fowler (December 24, 1862 – April 8, 1948) was an American judge in the state of Wisconsin. He was a justice of the Wisconsin Supreme Court for the last 19 years of his life, after serving 25 years as a Wisconsin Circuit Court Judge.

== Biography ==
Fowler was born Chester Almeron Fowler to Franklin Dwight and Maria Fowler in Rubicon, Wisconsin. On May 30, 1892, he married Carrie J. Smith. He graduated from what is now the University of Wisconsin–Whitewater and taught school. He studied law in Iowa and graduated from the University of Wisconsin. He then practiced law in Omaha, Nebraska, until returning to Wisconsin with his law partner.

== Career ==
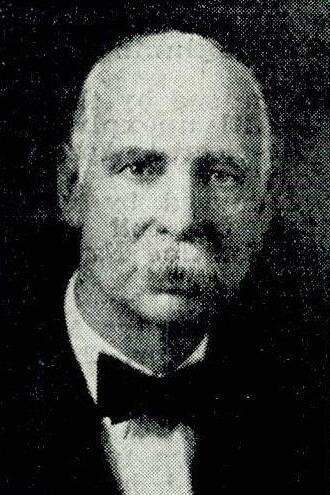
Fowler, circa 1929

Fowler was a circuit judge in Wisconsin from 1905 to 1929. He was appointed to the Wisconsin Supreme Court at the end of 1929 to replace the deceased Chief Justice Aad J. Vinje. The following spring, he won election to the remainder of the term and was re-elected twice more before dying in office in 1948.

== Electoral history ==
=== Wisconsin Supreme Court (1916) ===
1916 Wisconsin Supreme Court election
Party	Candidate	Votes	%	±%
General Election, April 1916
Nonpartisan	Franz C. Eschweiler	70,380	23.40%	
Nonpartisan	William J. Turner	64,568	21.46%	
Nonpartisan	Ellsworth B. Belden	57,670	19.17%	
Nonpartisan	Walter D. Corrigan	56,666	18.84%	
Nonpartisan	Chester A. Fowler	51,033	16.97%	
	Scattering	489	0.16%	
Plurality		5,812	1.93%	
Total votes		300,806	100.0%	

=== Wisconsin Supreme Court (1930, 1931, 1941) ===
1930 Wisconsin Supreme Court special election
Party	Candidate	Votes	%	±%
General Election, April 1, 1930
Nonpartisan	Chester A. Fowler (incumbent)	198,572	41.39%	
Nonpartisan	John W. Reynolds Sr.	184,317	38.42%	
Nonpartisan	Ray J. Cannon	96,908	20.20%	
	Scattering	433	0.09%	
Plurality		14,255	2.97%	
Total votes		480,230	100.0%	

1931 Wisconsin Supreme Court election
Party	Candidate	Votes	%	±%
General Election, April 7, 1931
Nonpartisan	Chester A. Fowler (incumbent)	254,534	46.87%	+5.52%
Nonpartisan	John W. Reynolds, Sr.	230,902	42.52%	+4.14%
Nonpartisan	George L. Mensing	57,590	10.61%	
Plurality		23,632	4.35%	+1.38%
Total votes		543,026	100.0%	+13.08%

1941 Wisconsin Supreme Court election
Party	Candidate	Votes	%	±%
General Election, April 1, 1941
Nonpartisan	Chester A. Fowler (incumbent)	290,276	54.89%	+8.02%
Nonpartisan	Alvin C. Reis	238,562	45.11%	
Plurality		51,714	9.78%	+5.43%
Total votes		528,838	100.0%	-2.61%

Legal offices
New circuit	Wisconsin Circuit Court Judge for the 18th Circuit; 1905 – 1929	Succeeded by Clayton F. Van Pelt
Preceded by Aad J. Vinje	Justice of the Wisconsin Supreme Court; 1929 – 1948	Succeeded by John E. Martin
