= Alvin C. Reis =

American politician (1892–1956)

The Honorable Alvin C. Reis
- portrait, circa 1929

Wisconsin Circuit Court Judge for the 9th Circuit, Branch 1
- In office July 1936 – January 24, 1956
- Preceded by: Albert G. Zimmerman
- Succeeded by: Richard W. Bardwell

Member of the Wisconsin Senate from the 26th district
- In office January 1, 1933 – January 1, 1935
- Preceded by: Glenn D. Roberts
- Succeeded by: Harold M. Groves

Member of the Wisconsin State Assembly from the Dane 1st district
- In office January 1, 1927 – January 1, 1931
- Preceded by: Herman W. Sachtjen
- Succeeded by: Harold M. Groves

Personal details
- Born: March 24, 1892 Evansville, Indiana
- Died: January 24, 1956 (aged 63) Madison, Wisconsin
- Resting place: Forest Hill Cemetery; Madison, Wisconsin
- Party: Republican

Military service
- Allegiance: United States
- Branch/service: United States Army
- Years of service: 1918–1919
- Rank: Major
- Battles/wars: World War I: Belleau Wood Campaign; Battle of Château-Thierry (1918); German spring offensive; Second Battle of the Marne; Hundred Days Offensive; Battle of Saint-Mihiel; Meuse–Argonne offensive

Alvin C. Reis (March 24, 1892 – January 24, 1956) was an American lawyer, politician, and judge. He was a Wisconsin Circuit Court Judge for the last 20 years of his life. Earlier in his career, he was a member of the Wisconsin State Assembly and the Wisconsin State Senate, and served as a United States Army officer in World War I.

== Biography ==
Reis, circa 1941

Reis was born on March 24, 1892, in Evansville, Indiana. He graduated from the University of Wisconsin-Madison and Harvard Law School. During World War II, he served as a major in the United States Army. Battles Reis took part in include the Battle of Château-Thierry, the Battle of Saint-Mihiel and the Meuse-Argonne Offensive. He died on January 24, 1956, in Madison, Wisconsin, and is buried at Forest Hill Cemetery.

== Political career ==
Reis was elected to the Assembly in 1926 and 1928 and to the Senate in 1932. Later, he became a judge on the Wisconsin Circuit Court. He was a Republican.

== Electoral history ==
=== Wisconsin Assembly (1926, 1928) ===
Wisconsin Assembly, Dane 1st District Election, 1926
Party	Candidate	Votes	%	±%
General Election, November 2, 1926
Republican	Alvin C. Reis	10,127	96.60%	
Prohibition	Portia Taynton	356	3.40%	
Total votes		'10,483'	'100.0%'	
Republican hold				

=== Wisconsin Attorney General (1930) ===
1930 Wisconsin Attorney General election
Party	Candidate	Votes	%	±%
General Election, April 1930
Republican	John W. Reynolds, Sr.	258,469	43.35%	
Republican	Michael Eberlein	175,147	29.37%	
Republican	Alvin C. Reis	133,739	22.43%	
Democratic	John J. Boyle	16,138	2.71%	
Socialist	Glenn P. Turner	11,549	1.94%	
Prohibition	Burton S. Hawley	1,218	0.20%	
General Election, November 4, 1930
Republican	John W. Reynolds, Sr.	375,616	68.10%	−0.19%
Democratic	John J. Boyle	125,315	22.72%	−4.06%
Socialist	Glenn P. Turner	35,169	6.38%	+2.27%
Prohibition	Burton S. Hawley	12,636	2.29%	+1.46%
Communist	William Martilla	2,827	0.51%	
Total votes		'551,563'	'100.0%'	-37.09%
Republican hold				

=== Wisconsin Senate (1932) ===
Wisconsin Senate, 26th District Election, 1932
Party	Candidate	Votes	%	±%
Primary Election, September 1932
Republican	Alvin C. Reis	20,935	56.89%	
Republican	Hovey	14,087	38.28%	
Democratic	Miles C. Riley	1,600	4.35%	
Socialist	Sam Mintz	137	0.37%	
Prohibition	W. J. Robinson	39	0.11%	
Total votes		'36,798'	'100.0%'	
General Election, November 8, 1932
Republican	Alvin C. Reis	23,277	52.18%	
Democratic	Miles C. Riley	20,057	44.96%	
Prohibition	W. J. Robinson	650	1.46%	
Socialist	Sam Mintz	629	1.41%	
Total votes		'44,613'	'100.0%'	
Republican hold				

=== Wisconsin Circuit Court (1937) ===
Wisconsin Circuit Court, 9th Circuit Branch 1 Election, 1937
Party	Candidate	Votes	%	±%
General Election, April 1937
Independent	Alvin C. Reis	18,812	100.0%	
Total votes		'18,812'	'100.0%'	

=== Wisconsin Supreme Court (1941) ===
1941 Wisconsin Supreme Court election
Party	Candidate	Votes	%	±%
General Election, April 1, 1941
Independent	Chester A. Fowler (incumbent)	290,276	54.89%	+8.02%
Independent	Alvin C. Reis	238,562	45.11%	
Total votes		'528,838'	'100.0%'	-2.61%

== See also ==
- Alvin C. Reis at Find a Grave

Legal offices
Preceded by Albert G. Zimmerman	Wisconsin Circuit Court Judge for the 9th Circuit, Branch 1; 1936 – 1956	Succeeded by Richard W. Bardwell
