= John J. Boyle (attorney) =

20th century American politician

United States Attorney for the Western District of Wisconsin
- In office February 20, 1935 – March 9, 1944 (death)
- Appointed by: Franklin D. Roosevelt
- Preceded by: Stanley M. Ryan
- Succeeded by: Charles H. Cashin

District Attorney of Lafayette County, Wisconsin
- In office January 1, 1921 – January 1, 1925
- Preceded by: Charles F. McDaniel
- Succeeded by: Harold J. Marcoe

Personal details
- Born: July 23, 1884 Gratiot, Wisconsin, U.S.
- Died: March 9, 1944 (aged 59) Madison, Wisconsin, U.S.
- Resting place: Holy Rosary Cemetery, Darlington, Wisconsin
- Party: Democratic
- Spouse: Mabel K. (Meyer) Stansell (m. 1917–1944)
- Children: John J. Boyle Jr.^{(b. 1918; died 1979)}; Mary E. (Wickhem)^{(b. 1922; died 2013)}; Roseann C. (Westphal)^{(b. 1928; died 2020)}; 4 stepchildren
- Education: Creighton University
- Profession: Lawyer

John Joseph Boyle Sr. (July 23, 1884 – March 9, 1944) was an American lawyer and Democratic politician from Lafayette County, Wisconsin. He served as United States Attorney for the Western District of Wisconsin for the last nine years of his life, through most of the presidency of Franklin D. Roosevelt. He previously served as district attorney of Lafayette County; he was an unsuccessful candidate for Attorney General of Wisconsin in 1928 and 1930, and for U.S. House of Representatives in 1932.

== Early life ==
John Joseph Boyle was born on July 23, 1884, in Gratiot, Wisconsin. He was raised and educated in Lafayette County, Wisconsin, before going west to O'Neill, Nebraska. In Nebraska, he attend law school at Creighton University, and graduated in 1910. He returned to Wisconsin in 1912, and started a law practice in Darlington.

== Career ==
After several years practicing law in Lafayette County, Boyle made his first run for district attorney in 1918, running on the Democratic Party ticket. He lost that election, but ran again in 1920 and was elected without opposition. He served two terms but was defeated running for a third term in 1924.

By 1928, Boyle had earned a reputation as a strong orator and that year he was an enthusiastic supporter of Catholic Al Smith in his presidential campaign. That year, Boyle also ran for Attorney General of Wisconsin, seeking to challenge incumbent John W. Reynolds Sr. Boyle won the Democratic nomination, narrowly defeating James E. Finnegan by 617 votes, but lost in a landslide to Reynolds in the general election, receiving only 27% of the vote.

Boyle was renominated for Attorney General again in 1930, without opposition in the primary. He was soundly beaten by Reynolds again in the general election, receiving only 23% this time.

In 1932, Boyle switched his allegiance from Al Smith to Franklin D. Roosevelt, and became an early supporter of Roosevelt's presidential campaign. He was elected as a Roosevelt delegate to the 1932 Democratic National Convention, and later that year he won the Democratic nomination for United States House of Representatives in Wisconsin's 3rd congressional district, defeating William Victora. He would lose the general election again, to incumbent Gardner R. Withrow.

Roosevelt, however, won the presidency and shortly after made clear his intention to appoint Boyle as a U.S. attorney. The incumbent U.S. Attorney, Hoover appointee Stanley Ryan, took note of Roosevelt's intentions and named Boyle as an assistant U.S. attorney in his office until the expiration of his term in 1935. That year, Roosevelt officially nominated Boyle to become United States Attorney for the Western District of Wisconsin; he was confirmed by the United States Senate on February 20, 1935. Boyle moved to Madison, Wisconsin, for his new job, where he resided until his death. He was re-appointed by Roosevelt to another four-year term in 1939, and again in 1943.

He died five months into his third term. He suffered from a bout of pneumonia, was hospitalized several times beginning in November 1943, but returned to work. He became critically ill on March 9, 1944, was hospitalized again, and died that night.

== Personal life and family ==
John J. Boyle was the eldest of nine children born to merchant John J. Boyle and his wife Rose Anna (née Gallagher). The Boyles were Irish Americans, his father emigrated from Ireland and his mother was a first generation American. Three of John's brothers, Wilfred, Bernard, and Hugh, were also attorneys.

John J. Boyle married widow Mabel K. Stansell (née Meyer) in Denver, Colorado, on June 6, 1916, and became stepfather to her four young children. They ultimately had three more children together. Their son, John Jr., became a prominent lawyer and a county judge in Rock County, Wisconsin. Their daughter, Mary (Wickhem), became one of the first women elected to the Rock County board of supervisors and served on the Governor's Commission on the Status of Women and the Wisconsin Welfare Council.

The Boyles were Catholics, and John Boyle was a member of the Knights of Columbus.

== Electoral history ==
=== Wisconsin Attorney General (1928, 1930) ===
1928 Wisconsin Attorney General election
| Party | Candidate | Votes | % | ±% |
|---|---|---|---|---|
Democratic Primary, September 4, 1928
| Democratic | John J. Boyle | 20,486 | 50.71% | |
| Democratic | James E. Finnegan | 19,869 | 49.18% | |
| | Scattering | 45 | 0.11% | |
| Plurality | | 617 | 1.53% | |
| Total votes | | 40,400 | 100.0% | |
General Election, November 6, 1928
| Republican | John W. Reynolds Sr. (inc.) | 598,730 | 68.29% | −17.25% |
| Democratic | John J. Boyle | 234,779 | 26.78% | |
| Socialist | George Mensing | 36,028 | 4.11% | −3.59% |
| Prohibition | Burton S. Hawley | 7,244 | 0.83% | −1.79% |
| Plurality | | 363,951 | 41.51% | -36.32% |
| Total votes | | 876,781 | 100.0% | +92.53% |
| Republican hold | | | | |

1930 Wisconsin Attorney General election
| Party | Candidate | Votes | % | ±% |
|---|---|---|---|---|
General Election, November 4, 1930
| Republican | John W. Reynolds Sr. (inc.) | 375,616 | 68.10% | −0.19% |
| Democratic | John J. Boyle | 125,315 | 22.72% | −4.06% |
| Socialist | Glenn P. Turner | 35,169 | 6.38% | +2.27% |
| Prohibition | Burton S. Hawley | 12,636 | 2.29% | +1.46% |
| Communist | William Martilla | 2,827 | 0.51% | |
| Plurality | | 250,301 | 45.38% | +3.87% |
| Total votes | | 551,563 | 100.0% | -37.09% |
| Republican hold | | | | |

=== U.S. House of Representatives (1932) ===
Wisconsin's 3rd Congressional District election, 1932
| Party | Candidate | Votes | % | ±% |
|---|---|---|---|---|
Democratic Primary, September 20, 1932
| Democratic | John J. Boyle | | | |
| Democratic | William Victora | | | |
| Total votes | | | | |
General Election, November 8, 1932
| Republican | Gardner R. Withrow | 59,535 | 60.64% | |
| Democratic | John J. Boyle | 38,646 | 39.36% | |
| Plurality | | 20,889 | 21.28% | |
| Total votes | | 98,181 | 100.0% | +116.24% |
| Republican hold | | | | |

Party political offices
| Preceded by J. Allan Simpson (1924) | Democratic nominee for Attorney General of Wisconsin; 1928, 1930 | Succeeded by James E. Finnegan |
Legal offices
| Preceded by Charles F. McDaniel | District Attorney of Lafayette County, Wisconsin; January 1, 1921 – January 1, 1925 | Succeeded by Harold J. Marcoe |
| Preceded by Stanley M. Ryan | United States Attorney for the Western District of Wisconsin; February 20, 1935 – March 9, 1944 (death) | Succeeded by Charles H. Cashin |
