= Walter Chilsen =

American politician (1923–2018)

Minority Leader of the Wisconsin Senate
- In office January 5, 1981 – January 3, 1983
- Preceded by: Clifford Krueger
- Succeeded by: James Harsdorf

Member of the Wisconsin Senate from the 29th district
- In office January 7, 1991 – January 2, 1967
- Preceded by: Charles F. Smith Jr.
- Succeeded by: Russ Decker

Personal details
- Born: Walter John Chilsen; November 18, 1923 Merrill, Wisconsin, U.S.
- Died: December 25, 2018 (aged 95) Wausau, Wisconsin, U.S.
- Party: Republican
- Spouse: Rose
- Relatives: Walter B. Chilsen (father)
- Education: Lawrence University
- Profession: Former TV News Director

Walter John Chilsen (November 11, 1923 – December 25, 2018) was an American politician who was a Republican Member of the Wisconsin Senate, representing the 29th District from 1967 to 1990.

== Biography ==
Chilsen attended Northwestern University, and later graduated with a BS from Lawrence University in 1949. He was a veteran of World War II, serving in the United States Army Air Forces from 1943 to 1945. He was a co-founder and board member of the Marathon County Workshop for the Handicapped.

Chilsen ran in the April 1, 1969 special election for Wisconsin's 7th congressional district to succeed Melvin Laird (R), who had been appointed and confirmed to be Secretary of Defense. Chilsen lost by 48-52% to David Obey (D), who held the seat another 41 years.

He died on December 25, 2018, at the age of 95. His father was Walter B. Chilsen who also served in the Wisconsin Legislature.
