= Thomas Reynolds (state representative) =

American politician

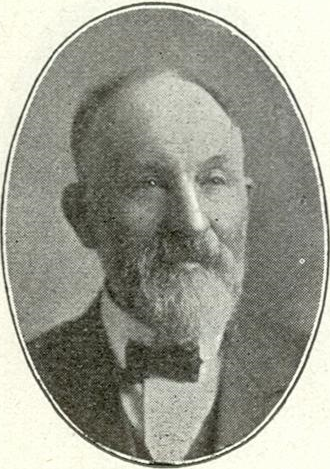

Member of the Wisconsin State Assembly from the Door County district
- In office January 7, 1907 – January 2, 1911
- Preceded by: Charles Reynolds
- Succeeded by: Lewis L. Johnson

Personal details
- Born: March 17, 1840 County Longford, Ireland, UK
- Died: January 11, 1919 (aged 78) Jacksonport, Wisconsin, U.S.
- Resting place: Saint Michaels Catholic Church Cemetery, Jacksonport, Wisconsin
- Party: Republican
- Spouse: Jane Foley (m. 1871–1919)
- Children: 10, including John W. Reynolds Sr.
- Relatives: Charles Reynolds (brother)
- Occupation: Farmer, politician

Thomas Reynolds (March 17, 1840 – January 11, 1919) was an Irish American immigrant, farmer, and Republican politician. He was a member of the Wisconsin State Assembly, representing Door County during the 1907 and 1909 sessions. He also served as chairman of the town of Jacksonport, Wisconsin.

He was the father of John W. Reynolds Sr.—the 26th attorney general of Wisconsin—and the grandfather of John W. Reynolds Jr.—a federal judge and the 36th governor of Wisconsin.

== Biography ==
Thomas Reynolds was born in County Longford, Ireland. He fled Ireland around 1865 due to involvement in a plot to incite an Irish revolt against British rule. In 1866, he moved to Madison, Wisconsin. He later settled in Jacksonport, Wisconsin, in Door County, and became involved in the lumber and farming industries. Reynolds died in Jacksonport in 1919 following an illness.

== Family ==
Reynolds married Jane Foley (1852–1922). They had ten children. His brother Charles Reynolds was also a member of the Assembly. Thomas Reynolds was the father of John W. Reynolds Sr., the 26th Attorney General of Wisconsin, and the grandfather of John W. Reynolds Jr., the 36th governor of Wisconsin and a federal judge.

== Political career ==
Reynolds was a member of the Assembly during the 1907 and 1909 sessions. In addition, he was chairman (similar to mayor) and a member of the town board (similar to city council) of Jacksonport. He was a Republican.
