= Glenn D. Roberts =

20th century American politician

Chairman of the Wisconsin Progressive Party
- In office October 1942 – March 1946
- Preceded by: J. K. Kyle
- Succeeded by: Position abolished

Member of the Wisconsin Senate from the 26th district
- In office January 7, 1929 – January 2, 1933
- Preceded by: Harry Sauthoff
- Succeeded by: Alvin C. Reis

District Attorney of Dane County, Wisconsin
- In office January 1, 1927 – January 7, 1929
- Preceded by: Philip La Follette
- Succeeded by: Fred E. Risser

Personal details
- Born: August 31, 1897 Sparta, Wisconsin, U.S.
- Died: September 2, 1989 (aged 92) Sparta, Wisconsin, U.S.
- Resting place: Mound Prairie Cemetery, Sparta, Wisconsin
- Party: Republican; Progressive (1934–1946)
- Spouse: Melva Frances Bickel (m. 1924–1989)
- Children: Barbara (Munson)^{(b. 1928; died 2008)}; Owen John Roberts^{(b. 1933; died 2021)}
- Education: Beloit College; University of Wisconsin Law School
- Profession: Lawyer

Military service
- Allegiance: United States
- Branch/service: United States Army
- Years of service: 1918–1919
- Rank: Corporal
- Unit: 426th Motor Truck Co.
- Battles/wars: World War I

Glenn David Roberts (August 31, 1897 – September 2, 1989) was an American lawyer and Progressive Republican politician from Madison, Wisconsin. He represented Dane County in the 1929 and 1931 sessions of the Wisconsin Senate. Throughout his political career, he was a close ally of Philip La Follette and served as a member of the central committee of La Follette's Wisconsin Progressive Party for its entire existence, from 1934 through 1946; he was the last chairman of the party.

== Early life ==
Glenn D. Roberts was born in Sparta, Wisconsin, in 1897. He was raised and educated there, attending the public schools, and then attended Beloit College for two years. He interrupted his studies to enlist in the United States Army for service in World War I. He served in a supply company and was briefly deployed in France with the American Expeditionary Forces.

After mustering out of service, he returned to his education, graduating from the University of Wisconsin Law School in 1922. He remained in Madison, Wisconsin, after graduating and went to work for the law firm Richmond, Jackman, Wilkie, and Toebaas. In November 1924, he was recommended as an assistant district attorney by Dane County's then-district attorney Philip La Follette. In addition to working with La Follette in the office of the district attorney, Roberts also joined La Follette's law firm, La Follette, Rogers and La Follette. Roberts' career for the next two decades would be tied to La Follette.

== Political career ==
In 1926, La Follette announced he would not run for another term as district attorney and Roberts launched a campaign to succeed him. Roberts faced no opposition in either the primary or general election and took office as district attorney in January 1927. During his term as district attorney, the Dane County board passed new regulations stating that, after January 1929, the district attorney would be prohibited from working as a private attorney while holding office. Roberts declared in February 1928 that he would not be a candidate to for re-election and would leave office in January 1929.

That summer, however, the incumbent state senator for Dane County, Harry Sauthoff, announced that he would not run for re-election in the state senate. La Follette, a leader of the progressive faction within the Republican Party, convinced Roberts to enter the race for Wisconsin Senate. With the backing of La Follette, Roberts defeated his stalwart Republican opponent, T. G. Murray, in the Republican primary. He went on to win the general election with 71% of the vote, defeating Democrat Thomas Quinn and Probitionist Warren J. Robinson. He went on to represent the 26th Senate district for the 1929 and 1931 legislative sessions.

Roberts sought renomination in 1932 with the strong backing of Philip La Follette, who by then had become Governor of Wisconsin. Many of La Follette's Dane County operatives, however, had already decided to support Alvin C. Reis for the nomination. Roberts was considered tainted by his serving as attorney for William J. Hobbins, who had been accused of falsifying records in his role as president of the Capital City Bank, after its collapse in the early days of the Great Depression. The matter was further complicated for La Follette by the involvement of many prominent progressives in the bank. La Follette briefly managed to convince his lieutenants to get in line and endorse Roberts, but they came back to him and reiterated their concerns that Roberts' candidacy was not salvageable, and they managed to convince La Follette to yield. Roberts dropped out of the race in favor of Reis, who went on to win the election.

After leaving office, Roberts worked briefly as a lobbyist for the Wisconsin Retail Furniture Dealers' Association, the Electrical Contractors and Dealers Association, and the Manufacturing Lumberman's Underwriters. In the meantime, Roberts continued his legal career and was made a partner in the La Follette law firm, renaming it La Follette, Rogers & Roberts. He also continued representing William J. Hobbins in his legal case, appealing his conviction to the Wisconsin Supreme Court. Roberts ultimately won a partial victory, getting one of the two charges against Hobbins dismissed in Hobbins v. State.

Roberts also remained active in politics. He joined La Follette's Wisconsin Progressive Party when it formally split from the Republicans in 1934 and became was a member of the state central committee of the party, serving several years as treasurer. Over the next decade, he made many political speeches on behalf of progressive candidates in person and over the radio. Through the late 1930s, he served as counsel to the Wisconsin Development Authority, a state corporation established to manage many of the state's Works Progress Administration funds. He ascended to become chairman of the Wisconsin Progressive Party in 1942, but the party dissolved four years later at a 1946 convention at which he advocated for reunification with the Republican Party.

== Later years ==
After the dissolution of the Progressive Party, Roberts largely stayed out of politics, but remained active as a lobbyist for the rest of his career. He devoted most of his time, however, to managing the former La Follette law firm, which by the late 1950s had become Roberts, Boardman, Suhr, Bjork, and Curry. He also became the owner of WEMP-FM, which then operated as a radio station covering much of southwestern Wisconsin.

He suffered a series of heart attacks and hospitalizations in the late 1950s and 1960s, before finally retiring from active legal work in 1967.

== Personal life and family ==
Glenn D. Roberts was born on the Roberts family farm in Monroe County, Wisconsin, the son of farmer John Roberts and his wife Winifred (née Williams).

He married Melva F. Bickel on September 2, 1924. They met while they were both employed in the law office of Richmond, Jackman, Wilkie, and Toebaas, in Madison. They had two children.

Glenn Roberts died at St. Mary's Hospital in Sparta, Wisconsin, at age 92. His wife lived until age 100, dying in 2004; at the time of her death, both children were still living, and they had three grandchildren and ten great-grandchildren.

Party political offices
Preceded by J. K. Kyle	Chairman of the Wisconsin Progressive Party; October 1942 – March 1946	Party abolished
Wisconsin Senate
Preceded by Harry Sauthoff	Member of the Wisconsin Senate from the 26th district January 7, 1929 – January 2, 1933	Succeeded by Alvin C. Reis
Legal offices
Preceded by Philip La Follette	District Attorney of Dane County, Wisconsin; January 1, 1927 – January 7, 1929	Succeeded by Fred E. Risser
