= James E. Finnegan =

American politician

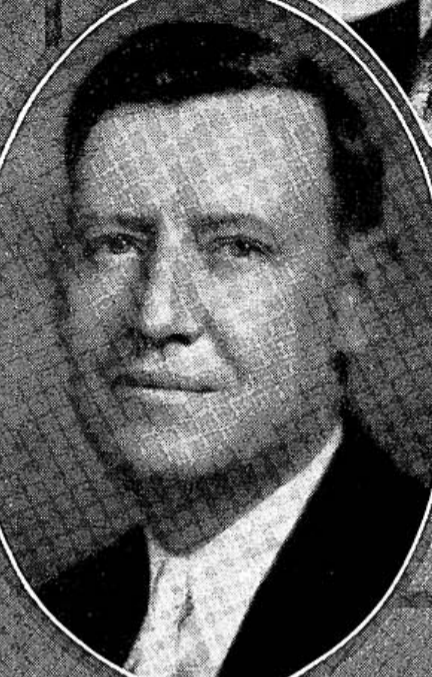

27th Attorney General of Wisconsin
- In office January 2, 1933 – January 4, 1937
- Governor: Albert G. Schmedeman; Philip La Follette
- Preceded by: John W. Reynolds, Sr.
- Succeeded by: Orland Steen Loomis

Personal details
- Born: November 26, 1892 Milwaukee, Wisconsin
- Died: November 21, 1966 (aged 73)
- Party: Democratic
- Spouse: Olive M. Frawley (m. 1916)
- Education: Marquette University

James E. Finnegan (November 26, 1892 – November 21, 1966) was an American politician from Wisconsin.

== Biography ==
Finnegan was born James Edward Finnegan on November 26, 1892 to Irish parents John and Julia Finnegan in Milwaukee, Wisconsin. On September 12, 1916 he married Olive M. Frawley. Finnegan received his law degree from Marquette University and was receiving clerk for the Milwaukee County courts. He also taught evening high school classes. Finnegan was Roman Catholic and was a member of the Knights of Columbus.

== Career ==
Finnegan served as Attorney General of Wisconsin from 1933 to 1937. He was an unsuccessful candidate for U.S. Senate from Wisconsin in 1940, losing to incumbent Robert M. La Follette, Jr. He was a Democrat.

== Death ==
Finnegan died on November 21, 1966, from cardiovascular disease.

== See also ==
- List of attorneys general of Wisconsin

Party political offices
Preceded by John J. Boyle	Democratic nominee for Attorney General of Wisconsin; 1932, 1934, 1936, 1938	Succeeded by Gustav J. Keller
Preceded by John M. Callahan	Democratic nominee for U.S. Senator from Wisconsin (Class 1); 1940	Succeeded by Howard J. McMurray
Legal offices
Preceded by John W. Reynolds, Sr.	Attorney General of Wisconsin; 1933–1937	Succeeded by Orland Steen Loomis
