= Kenneth Philip Grubb =

American judge

Judge of the United States District Court for the Eastern District of Wisconsin
- In office June 16, 1955 – October 8, 1965
- Appointed by: Dwight D. Eisenhower
- Preceded by: Seat established by 68 Stat. 8
- Succeeded by: John W. Reynolds Jr.

Personal details
- Born: Kenneth Philip Grubb; September 14, 1895 Mauston, Wisconsin
- Died: March 11, 1976 (aged 80)
- Education: University of Wisconsin Law School (LL.B.)

Kenneth Philip Grubb (September 14, 1895 – March 11, 1976) was a United States district judge of the United States District Court for the Eastern District of Wisconsin.

== Education and career ==
Born in Mauston, Wisconsin, Grubb was a United States Army Lieutenant in World War I, and thereafter received a Bachelor of Laws from the University of Wisconsin Law School in 1921. He was in private practice in Milwaukee, Wisconsin from 1921 to 1955.

== Federal judicial service ==
On May 13, 1955, Grubb was nominated by President Dwight D. Eisenhower to a new seat on the United States District Court for the Eastern District of Wisconsin created by 68 Stat. 8. He was confirmed by the United States Senate on June 15, 1955, and received his commission the next day. Grubb served in that capacity until his retirement on October 8, 1965. He died on March 11, 1976.

== Sources ==
Legal offices
Preceded by Seat established by 68 Stat. 8	Judge of the United States District Court for the Eastern District of Wisconsin; 1955–1965	Succeeded by John W. Reynolds Jr.
