= 1962 Wisconsin gubernatorial election =

- November 6, 1962
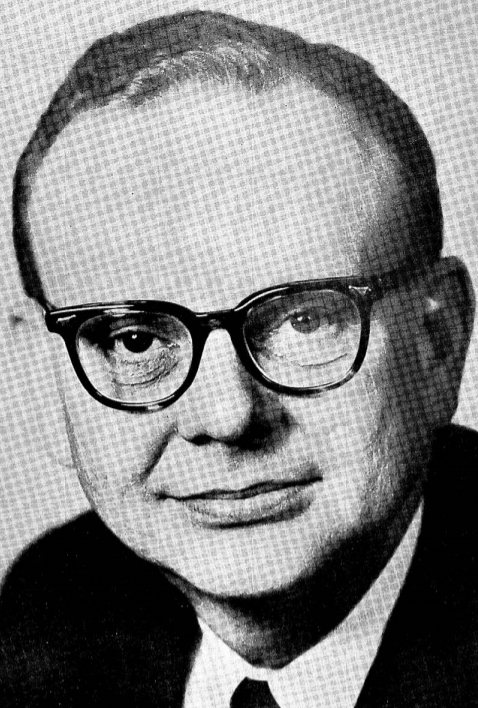

| Nominee | John W. Reynolds | Philip Kuehn |
| Party | Democratic | Republican |
| Popular vote | 637,491 | 625,536 |
| Percentage | 50.36% | 49.41% |
- County results Reynolds: 40–50% 50–60% 60–70% Kuehn: 40–50% 50–60% 60–70%
Governor before election
Gaylord A. Nelson
Democratic
Elected Governor
John W. Reynolds
Democratic

The 1962 Wisconsin gubernatorial election was held on November 6, 1962. Democrat John W. Reynolds won the election with 50.36% of the vote, narrowly defeating Republican Philip Kuehn in the state's closest gubernatorial election since 1940. To date, this is the only time Menominee County has voted for the Republican candidate in a gubernatorial election.

== Primary election ==
The primary election was held on September 11, 1962.

=== Democratic party ===
==== Candidates ====
- John W. Reynolds, Attorney General of Wisconsin

==== Results ====
Democratic primary results
| Party | Candidate | Votes | % |
|---|---|---|---|
| Democratic | John W. Reynolds | 199,940 | 100.00% |
| Total votes | | 199,940 | 100.00% |

=== Republican party ===
==== Candidates ====
- Philip G. Kuehn, former chairman of the Wisconsin Republican Party (1955–1958) and nominee for governor in 1960
- Wilbur N. Renk
- Robert L. Sucher, grandson of Robert M. La Follette and Democratic nominee for Attorney General in 1956

==== Results ====
Republican primary results
| Party | Candidate | Votes | % |
|---|---|---|---|
| Republican | Philip G. Kuehn | 250,539 | 53.87% |
| Republican | Wilbur N. Renk | 199,616 | 42.92% |
| Republican | Robert L. Sucher | 14,952 | 3.21% |
| Total votes | | 465,107 | 100.00% |

== General election ==
=== Candidates ===
- John W. Reynolds, Democrat
- Philip G. Kuehn, Republican
- Adolf Wiggert, Independent

=== Results ===
1962 Wisconsin gubernatorial election
| Party | Candidate | Votes | % | ±% |
|---|---|---|---|---|
| Democratic | John W. Reynolds | 637,491 | 50.36% | −1.20% |
| Republican | Philip G. Kuehn | 625,536 | 49.41% | +0.97% |
| Independent | Adolf Wiggert | 2,477 | 0.20% | |
| | Scattering (Note: These are not listed in the Blue Book but are listed in the Board of Canvassers report.) | 396 | 0.03% | |
| Majority | | 11,955 | 0.94% | |
| Total votes | | 1,265,900 | 100.00% | |
| Democratic hold | | Swing | -2.17% | |

=== Results by county ===
After this election, Rock County would not vote for the losing candidate again until 2010 and Brown County would not vote for the losing candidate again until 2002.

| County | John W. Reynolds Democratic | | Philip G. Kuehn Republican | | Adolf Wiggert Independent | | Scattering Write-in | | Margin | | Total votes cast |
| County | # | % | # | % | # | % | # | % | # | % | Total votes cast |
|---|---|---|---|---|---|---|---|---|---|---|---|
| Adams | 1,453 | 52.25% | 1,320 | 47.46% | 7 | 0.25% | 1 | 0.04% | 133 | 4.78% | 2,781 |
| Ashland | 3,846 | 59.90% | 2,574 | 40.09% | 1 | 0.02% | 0 | 0.00% | 1,272 | 19.81% | 6,421 |
| Barron | 4,172 | 44.85% | 5,118 | 55.02% | 12 | 0.13% | 0 | 0.00% | -946 | -10.17% | 9,302 |
| Bayfield | 2,468 | 55.70% | 1,955 | 44.12% | 8 | 0.18% | 0 | 0.00% | 513 | 11.58% | 4,431 |
| Brown | 19,178 | 49.11% | 19,790 | 50.67% | 86 | 0.22% | 0 | 0.00% | -612 | -1.57% | 39,054 |
| Buffalo | 1,861 | 46.63% | 2,130 | 53.37% | 0 | 0.00% | 0 | 0.00% | -269 | -6.74% | 3,991 |
| Burnett | 1,755 | 53.34% | 1,530 | 46.50% | 5 | 0.15% | 0 | 0.00% | 225 | 6.84% | 3,290 |
| Calumet | 2,926 | 43.04% | 3,871 | 56.93% | 2 | 0.03% | 0 | 0.00% | -945 | -13.90% | 6,799 |
| Chippewa | 6,937 | 52.61% | 6,235 | 47.29% | 13 | 0.10% | 0 | 0.00% | 702 | 5.32% | 13,185 |
| Clark | 4,604 | 49.80% | 4,634 | 50.12% | 7 | 0.18% | 0 | 0.00% | -30 | -0.32% | 9,245 |
| Columbia | 5,121 | 43.56% | 6,622 | 56.32% | 9 | 0.08% | 5 | 0.04% | -1,501 | -12.77% | 11,757 |
| Crawford | 2,536 | 48.69% | 2,671 | 51.29% | 0 | 0.00% | 1 | 0.02% | -135 | -2.59% | 5,208 |
| Dane | 39,321 | 55.56% | 31,144 | 44.00% | 224 | 0.32% | 85 | 0.12% | 8,177 | 11.55% | 70,774 |
| Dodge | 8,068 | 42.72% | 10,799 | 57.18% | 7 | 0.04% | 11 | 0.06% | -2,731 | -14.46% | 18,885 |
| Door | 2,591 | 34.07% | 4,987 | 65.58% | 3 | 0.04% | 23 | 0.30% | -2,396 | -31.51% | 7,604 |
| Douglas | 10,514 | 65.16% | 5,603 | 34.72% | 19 | 0.12% | 0 | 0.00% | 4,911 | 30.44% | 16,136 |
| Dunn | 3,031 | 42.84% | 4,039 | 57.09% | 4 | 0.06% | 1 | 0.01% | -1,008 | -14.25% | 7,075 |
| Eau Claire | 9,349 | 49.84% | 9,378 | 49.99% | 31 | 0.17% | 1 | 0.01% | -29 | -0.15% | 18,759 |
| Florence | 753 | 51.58% | 706 | 48.36% | 0 | 0.00% | 1 | 0.07% | 47 | 3.22% | 1,460 |
| Fond du Lac | 9,855 | 43.31% | 12,864 | 56.54% | 27 | 0.12% | 6 | 0.03% | -3,009 | -13.23% | 22,752 |
| Forest | 1,724 | 57.18% | 1,286 | 42.65% | 5 | 0.17% | 0 | 0.00% | 438 | 14.53% | 3,015 |
| Grant | 3,910 | 35.02% | 7,242 | 64.86% | 11 | 0.10% | 3 | 0.03% | -3,332 | -29.84% | 11,166 |
| Green | 2,552 | 35.12% | 4,706 | 64.76% | 7 | 0.10% | 2 | 0.03% | -2,154 | -29.64% | 7,267 |
| Green Lake | 1,715 | 32.98% | 3,484 | 67.00% | 1 | 0.02% | 0 | 0.00% | -1,769 | -34.02% | 5,200 |
| Iowa | 2,499 | 41.02% | 3,583 | 58.81% | 4 | 0.07% | 6 | 0.10% | -1,084 | -17.79% | 6,092 |
| Iron | 1,741 | 60.85% | 1,112 | 38.87% | 8 | 0.28% | 0 | 0.00% | 629 | 21.99% | 2,861 |
| Jackson | 2,187 | 44.80% | 2,689 | 55.08% | 6 | 0.12% | 0 | 0.00% | -502 | -10.28% | 4,882 |
| Jefferson | 7,004 | 42.99% | 9,259 | 56.84% | 15 | 0.09% | 13 | 0.08% | -2,255 | -13.84% | 16,291 |
| Juneau | 2,498 | 43.78% | 3,204 | 56.15% | 2 | 0.04% | 2 | 0.04% | -706 | -12.37% | 5,706 |
| Kenosha | 18,812 | 57.77% | 13,710 | 42.10% | 41 | 0.13% | 0 | 0.00% | 5,102 | 15.67% | 32,563 |
| Kewaunee | 3,277 | 52.14% | 3,006 | 47.83% | 2 | 0.03% | 0 | 0.00% | 271 | 4.31% | 6,285 |
| La Crosse | 10,410 | 43.81% | 13,251 | 55.76% | 102 | 0.43% | 0 | 0.00% | -2,841 | -11.96% | 23,763 |
| Lafayette | 2,085 | 41.65% | 2,913 | 58.19% | 3 | 0.06% | 5 | 0.10% | -828 | -16.54% | 5,006 |
| Langlade | 3,384 | 51.56% | 3,172 | 48.33% | 7 | 0.11% | 0 | 0.00% | 212 | 3.23% | 6,563 |
| Lincoln | 3,269 | 43.48% | 4,238 | 56.36% | 11 | 0.15% | 1 | 0.01% | -969 | -12.89% | 7,519 |
| Manitowoc | 14,860 | 58.01% | 10,697 | 41.76% | 61 | 0.24% | 0 | 0.00% | 4,163 | 16.25% | 25,618 |
| Marathon | 14,895 | 50.99% | 14,253 | 48.80% | 55 | 0.19% | 6 | 0.02% | 642 | 2.20% | 29,209 |
| Marinette | 5,560 | 47.92% | 6,028 | 51.95% | 12 | 0.10% | 3 | 0.03% | -468 | -4.03% | 11,603 |
| Marquette | 1,013 | 35.73% | 1,805 | 63.67% | 2 | 0.07% | 15 | 0.53% | -792 | -27.94% | 2,835 |
| Menominee | 283 | 49.05% | 292 | 50.61% | 2 | 0.35% | 0 | 0.00% | -9 | -1.56% | 577 |
| Milwaukee | 192,446 | 57.98% | 138,371 | 41.69% | 998 | 0.30% | 110 | 0.03% | 54,075 | 16.29% | 331,925 |
| Monroe | 4,006 | 44.20% | 5,051 | 55.73% | 6 | 0.07% | 0 | 0.00% | -1,045 | -11.53% | 9,063 |
| Oconto | 3,856 | 46.54% | 4,421 | 53.36% | 9 | 0.11% | 0 | 0.00% | -565 | -6.82% | 8,286 |
| Oneida | 4,079 | 48.66% | 4,299 | 51.29% | 3 | 0.04% | 1 | 0.01% | -220 | -2.62% | 8,382 |
| Outagamie | 12,689 | 42.46% | 17,100 | 57.22% | 95 | 0.32% | 0 | 0.00% | -4,411 | -14.76% | 29,884 |
| Ozaukee | 5,654 | 41.26% | 8,037 | 58.66% | 11 | 0.08% | 0 | 0.00% | -2,383 | -17.39% | 13,702 |
| Pepin | 1,215 | 51.42% | 1,147 | 48.54% | 1 | 0.04% | 0 | 0.00% | 68 | 2.88% | 2,363 |
| Pierce | 2,849 | 44.38% | 3,562 | 55.48% | 7 | 0.11% | 2 | 0.03% | -713 | -11.11% | 6,420 |
| Polk | 3,501 | 50.29% | 3,454 | 49.62% | 6 | 0.09% | 0 | 0.00% | 47 | 0.68% | 6,961 |
| Portage | 7,706 | 61.76% | 4,766 | 38.20% | 0 | 0.00% | 6 | 0.05% | 2,940 | 23.56% | 12,478 |
| Price | 2,546 | 50.65% | 2,473 | 49.19% | 8 | 0.16% | 0 | 0.00% | 73 | 1.45% | 5,027 |
| Racine | 25,130 | 53.31% | 21,966 | 46.60% | 38 | 0.08% | 1 | 0.00% | 3,164 | 6.71% | 47,135 |
| Richland | 2,070 | 38.02% | 3,367 | 61.84% | 6 | 0.11% | 2 | 0.04% | -1,297 | -23.82% | 5,445 |
| Rock | 13,807 | 41.90% | 19,098 | 57.96% | 39 | 0.12% | 7 | 0.02% | -5,291 | -16.06% | 32,951 |
| Rusk | 2,892 | 55.33% | 2,323 | 44.44% | 10 | 0.19% | 2 | 0.04% | 569 | 10.89% | 5,227 |
| Sauk | 4,414 | 40.16% | 6,552 | 59.62% | 12 | 0.11% | 12 | 0.11% | -2,138 | -19.45% | 10,990 |
| Sawyer | 1,334 | 41.19% | 1,896 | 58.54% | 9 | 0.28% | 0 | 0.00% | -562 | -17.35% | 3,239 |
| Shawano | 4,055 | 39.77% | 6,127 | 60.09% | 15 | 0.15% | 0 | 0.00% | -2,072 | -20.32% | 10,197 |
| Sheboygan | 17,136 | 53.65% | 14,720 | 46.08% | 71 | 0.22% | 15 | 0.05% | 2,416 | 7.56% | 31,942 |
| St. Croix | 4,531 | 49.88% | 4,478 | 49.30% | 74 | 0.81% | 0 | 0.00% | 53 | 0.58% | 9,083 |
| Taylor | 2,907 | 54.52% | 2,414 | 45.27% | 11 | 0.21% | 0 | 0.00% | 493 | 9.25% | 5,332 |
| Trempealeau | 3,351 | 50.21% | 3,317 | 49.70% | 5 | 0.07% | 1 | 0.01% | 34 | 0.51% | 6,674 |
| Vernon | 3,665 | 45.34% | 4,416 | 54.63% | 2 | 0.02% | 1 | 0.01% | -751 | -9.29% | 8,084 |
| Vilas | 1,724 | 38.65% | 2,724 | 61.08% | 11 | 0.25% | 1 | 0.02% | -1,000 | -22.42% | 4,460 |
| Walworth | 5,489 | 34.33% | 10,484 | 65.57% | 14 | 0.09% | 2 | 0.01% | -4,995 | -31.24% | 15,989 |
| Washburn | 1,711 | 46.58% | 1,955 | 53.23% | 7 | 0.19% | 0 | 0.00% | -244 | -6.64% | 3,673 |
| Washington | 6,226 | 42.82% | 8,299 | 57.07% | 8 | 0.06% | 8 | 0.06% | -2,073 | -14.26% | 14,541 |
| Waukesha | 23,574 | 43.31% | 30,734 | 56.46% | 99 | 0.18% | 24 | 0.04% | -7,160 | -13.15% | 54,431 |
| Waupaca | 3,976 | 34.57% | 7,520 | 65.39% | 5 | 0.04% | 0 | 0.00% | -3,544 | -30.81% | 11,501 |
| Waushara | 1,771 | 31.43% | 3,861 | 68.52% | 3 | 0.05% | 0 | 0.00% | -2,090 | -37.09% | 5,635 |
| Winnebago | 14,129 | 41.97% | 19,483 | 57.87% | 49 | 0.15% | 4 | 0.01% | -5,354 | -15.90% | 33,665 |
| Wood | 9,035 | 49.41% | 9,221 | 50.43% | 23 | 0.13% | 6 | 0.03% | -186 | -1.02% | 18,285 |
| Total | 637,491 | 50.36% | 625,536 | 49.41% | 2,477 | 0.20% | 396 | 0.03% | 11,955 | 0.94% | 1,265,900 |

==== Counties that flipped from Republican to Democratic ====
- Adams
- Marathon
- Price
- Sheboygan

==== Counties that flipped from Democratic to Republican ====
- Brown
- Buffalo
- Crawford
- Eau Claire
- Oneida
- Pierce
- Vernon
- Washburn
