= Reuben W. Peterson =

American politician

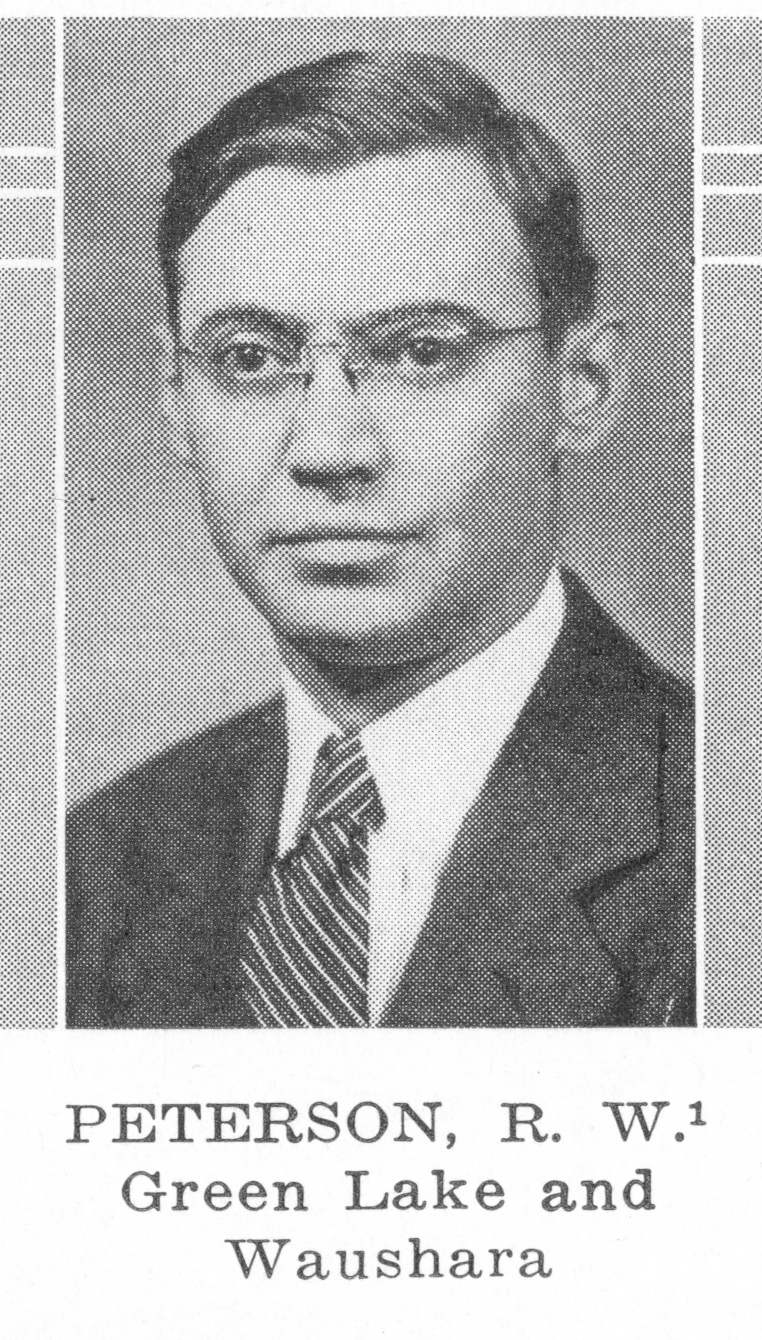
Reuben W. Peterson

Reuben W. Peterson (November 22, 1899 – April 1, 1979) was a member of the Wisconsin State Assembly. He was a Republican.

== Biography ==
Peterson was born on November 22, 1899, in Berlin, Wisconsin, to Nels and Martha Peterson. During World War I, he served with the United States Navy.

== Political career ==
Peterson was a member of the Assembly from 1935 until his resignation in 1939. In 1927, he was District Attorney of Green Lake County, Wisconsin. Additionally, he was a delegate to the 1936 Republican National Convention.
