= Henry J. Overbeck =

American politician

Henry J. Overbeck (February 2, 1853 – March 3, 1921) was an insurance agent, telegraph operator, and politician.

Born in Tonawanda, New York, Overbeck moved with his parents to Lake Mills, Wisconsin in 1855. Overbeck was the manager of Western Union in Sturgeon Bay, Wisconsin and was a telegraph operator and insurance agent. Overbeck was involved with the Republican Party. From 1897 to 1903, Overbeck served in the Wisconsin State Assembly. Overbeck died in a hospital in Milwaukee, Wisconsin from pneumonia due to from surgery for a throat infection.
