= Walter B. Chilsen =

American newspaper editor and politician

Walter Bert Chilsen
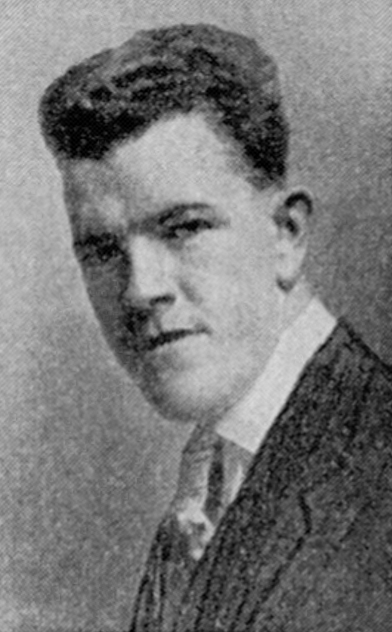
- Chilsen, c. 1919
- In office 1919–1920

Personal details
- Born: June 22, 1885 Merrill, Wisconsin, U.S.
- Died: July 2, 1982 (aged 97) Merrill, Wisconsin, U.S.

Walter Bert Chilsen (June 22, 1885 – July 2, 1982) was an American newspaper editor and politician.

== Biography ==
Chilsen was born in Merrill, Wisconsin and was educated in the public schools. He worked in the railroad construction business as a commissary clerk and in the mercantile business. Chilsen also worked as a rural mail carrier. Chilsen was also in the printing business and was one of the editors of the Merrill Daily Herald. Chilsen served on the Merrill City Council and on the Lincoln County Board. Chilsen was a Republican. Chilsen served in the Wisconsin State Assembly in 1919 and 1920. He ran for the United States House of Representative in 1928 and for the United States Senate seat in 1940 on the Republican ticket and lost both elections. Chilsen died at Holy Cross Hospital in Merrill, Wisconsin. His son was Walter Chilsen who also served in the Wisconsin Legislature.
