= John W. Reynolds Jr. =

American politician (1921–2002)

The Honorable John W. Reynolds Jr.
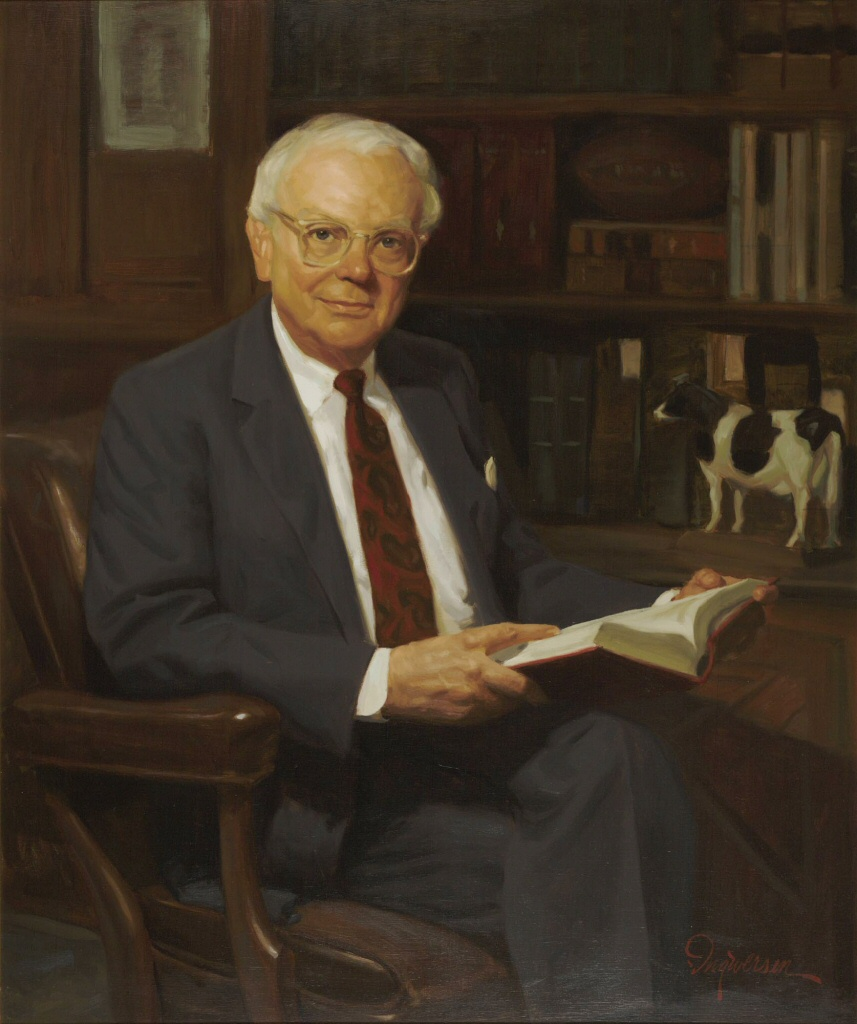

Senior Judge of the United States District Court for the Eastern District of Wisconsin
- In office August 31, 1986 – January 6, 2002

Chief Judge of the United States District Court for the Eastern District of Wisconsin
- In office 1971–1986
- Preceded by: Robert Emmet Tehan
- Succeeded by: Robert W. Warren

Judge of the United States District Court for the Eastern District of Wisconsin
- In office October 21, 1965 – August 31, 1986
- Appointed by: Lyndon B. Johnson
- Preceded by: Kenneth Philip Grubb
- Succeeded by: Joseph Peter Stadtmueller

36th Governor of Wisconsin
- In office January 7, 1963 – January 4, 1965
- Lieutenant: Jack B. Olson
- Preceded by: Gaylord Nelson
- Succeeded by: Warren P. Knowles

34th Attorney General of Wisconsin
- In office January 5, 1959 – January 7, 1963
- Governor: Gaylord Nelson
- Preceded by: Stewart G. Honeck
- Succeeded by: George Thompson

Personal details
- Born: John Whitcome Reynolds Jr. April 4, 1921 Green Bay, Wisconsin, US
- Died: January 7, 2002 (aged 80) Milwaukee, Wisconsin, US
- Party: Democratic
- Spouses: Patricia Ann Brody (m. 1947–1967); Jane Conway
- Children: 5
- Parents: John W. Reynolds Sr. (father); Madge (Flately) Reynolds (mother)
- Relatives: Thomas Reynolds (grandfather)
- Education: University of Wisconsin–Madison (Ph.B.); University of Wisconsin Law School (LL.B.)
- Profession: Attorney, judge

Military service
- Allegiance: United States
- Branch/service: United States Army
- Years of service: 1942–1946
- Rank: 1st Lieutenant
- Battles/wars: World War II

John Whitcome Reynolds Jr. (April 4, 1921 – January 6, 2002) was the 36th governor of Wisconsin (1963–1965) and served 21 years as a United States district judge in the Eastern District of Wisconsin (1965–1986). A Democrat, he previously served as the 34th attorney general of Wisconsin (1959–1963).

His father, John W. Reynolds Sr., was the 26th Attorney General of Wisconsin; his grandfather, Thomas Reynolds, was a member of the Wisconsin State Assembly.

== Early life ==
John W. Reynolds Jr. was born April 4, 1921, in Green Bay, Wisconsin, the son of Madge (Flatley) and John W. Reynolds Sr. He was educated at Green Bay, and graduated from Green Bay East High School. He attended the University of Wisconsin–Madison, but interrupted his studies in 1942 to enlist in the United States Army for service in World War II. He initially served in the infantry, rising to the rank of master sergeant by 1944. That year, he was commissioned as an officer and transferred to the Counterintelligence Corps, where he continued to serve until 1946. He was honorably discharged in 1946 as a first lieutenant, but remained in the United States Army Reserve into the 1950s. After leaving active duty, he completed his bachelor's degree at the University of Wisconsin. He immediately entered University of Wisconsin Law School, where he earned his LL.B. in 1949. While in law school, he became involved with the Democratic Party of Wisconsin and the Young Democrats and worked as a legal research assistant in the office of the Attorney General of Wisconsin. After graduation, he moved with his wife back to Green Bay, Wisconsin, and started a legal practice there.

== Political career ==
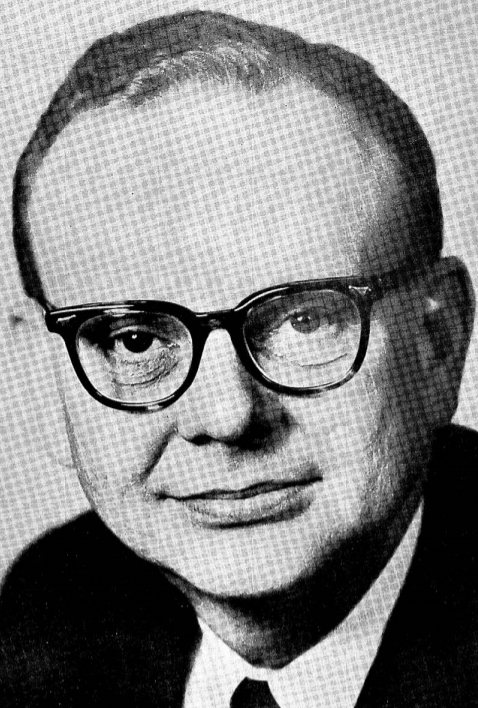
Reynolds as governor

In 1950, Reynolds entered the race for United States House of Representatives in Wisconsin's 8th congressional district, challenging three-term incumbent Republican John W. Byrnes. Reynolds unanimously received the Democratic nomination, but fell far short of Byrnes in the general election, taking only 38% of the vote. Shortly after the election, however, he was appointed district director of the Office of Price Stabilization, where he served until 1953. He also remained influential in local politics and was chairman of the Brown County Democratic Party from 1952 to 1956. In 1955, he was appointed court commissioner for the northern region of the United States District Court for the Eastern District of Wisconsin, where he served until beginning his campaign for Attorney General of Wisconsin in 1958.

At the urging of Democratic State Party Chairman Patrick Lucey, Reynolds entered the race for Attorney General in 1958, hoping to unseat incumbent Stewart G. Honeck. Reynolds faced a difficult Democratic primary against Milwaukee County Democratic Chairman Christ T. Seraphim, who had the endorsement of the state AFL–CIO. Reynolds, however, earned the enthusiastic endorsement of influential Madisonians, Arthur J. Altmeyer, known as the father of the Social Security Act, and James Edward Doyle, the former chairman of the state party. Reynolds went on to win the primary with a comfortable margin, taking over 60% of the vote. He went on to defeat Honeck with nearly 54% of the general election vote. He was reelected in 1960, and was elected Governor of Wisconsin in 1962. He was defeated seeking reelection in 1964.

=== 1960s redistricting ===
Following the 1960 United States census, the Wisconsin Legislature failed to pass a redistricting plan in the 1961–1962 session as required by the Wisconsin Constitution. In his capacity as Attorney General of Wisconsin, Reynolds brought a lawsuit in federal court to compel the Legislature to fulfill that obligation. The U.S. District Court appointed former Wisconsin Supreme Court justice Emmert L. Wingert as special master to investigate the issue and interview the relevant parties. After completing his investigation, Judge Wingert reported that he believed the redistricting suit should be dismissed and found no evidence that the failure to redistrict would result in "discrimination". The court accepted his recommendation and dismissed the suit, though they did warn that the issue could be renewed if no redistricting plan was passed by August 1963.

Following the ruling, Reynolds was elected Governor and resumed his push for a redistricting law. The Legislature passed a new map, but Reynolds rejected it as failing to provide equal representation for all Wisconsin voters. Finally, in July 1963, the Legislature attempted to circumvent Reynolds by passing their redistricting law as a joint resolution. Reynolds, in response, brought suit to the Wisconsin Supreme Court, which ruled in State ex rel. Reynolds v. Zimmerman (22 Wis. 2d 544) that the Wisconsin Constitution did not permit the Legislature to bypass the Governor in redistricting. They further stated that if no redistricting law was passed by May 1, 1964, they would issue their own plan for the 1964 elections.

A last-ditch effort was made by the Legislature, but their final attempt was again rejected by Governor Reynolds, who criticized the partisan bias of the map, calling it "a fraud upon the people".

On May 14, 1964, the Wisconsin Supreme Court issued its plan in a filing in State ex rel. Reynolds v. Zimmerman (23 Wis. 2d 606). The new plan was embraced by Governor Reynolds, who called it, "the culmination of my four-year fight for equal voting rights for the people of the state of Wisconsin." This was the first time in United States history that a state court had stepped in to draw legislative districts. Subsequent to 1964, three of the next four redistricting cycles in Wisconsin would result in court-ordered plans.

=== Presidential surrogate candidacy ===
Reynolds opposed segregationist George Wallace in the Wisconsin contest during the 1964 Democratic presidential primaries, who would otherwise have run unopposed, as President Lyndon B. Johnson refused to say he was in the race. Like the other "favorite sons" who ran in Johnson's place (such as Matthew E. Welsh and Daniel Brewster), he won his state's primaries. As is required, Wisconsin delegates to the 1964 Democratic National Convention voted for Reynolds on the first ballot, then voted for Johnson.

== Federal judicial service ==
Reynolds was nominated by President Lyndon B. Johnson on October 13, 1965, to a seat on the United States District Court for the Eastern District of Wisconsin vacated by Judge Kenneth Philip Grubb. He was confirmed by the United States Senate on October 21, 1965, and received his commission on October 21, 1965. He served as Chief Judge from 1971 to 1986. He assumed senior status on August 31, 1986. His service terminated on January 7, 2002, due to his death in Milwaukee, Wisconsin.

=== Notable case ===
As a judge, Reynolds ordered the desegregation of Milwaukee's schools in 1976. That decision was appealed and appealed again to the Supreme Court in Brennan v. Armstrong (1977). The case was remanded to his court for reconsideration. Reynolds supervised the resulting five-year plan to integrate Milwaukee schools.

== Personal life and family ==
Reynolds was the son of John W. Reynolds Sr., the 26th Attorney General of Wisconsin. His father was active in Wisconsin politics throughout his childhood as a member of Robert M. La Follette's Progressive Republican faction, and joined the Wisconsin Progressive Party after its split from the Republicans. His paternal grandfather was also active in politics and was elected to the Wisconsin State Assembly from Door County in 1906.

John Reynolds Jr. married Patricia Ann Brody of La Crosse, Wisconsin, in 1947. They met at a Young Democrats meeting at the University of Wisconsin while they were both students there. Brody's father, Lawrence, was also involved in politics and had been district attorney of La Crosse County in the 1920s and 1930s. John and Patricia had three children together, Kate, Molly, and Jim, before her death in 1967. After Patricia's death, Reynolds married Jane Conway and had five more children.

== Electoral history ==
=== U.S. House of Representatives (1950) ===
Wisconsin's 8th Congressional District Election, 1950
Party	Candidate	Votes	%	±%
General Election, November 7, 1950
Republican	John W. Byrnes (incumbent)	71,908	62.10%	+5.48%
Democratic	John W. Reynolds	43,877	37.89%	−4.82%
Socialist	Lee Schaal	1	0.00%	−0.19%
Plurality		28,031	24.21%	+10.30%
Total votes		115,786	100.0%	-7.54%
Republican hold				

=== Wisconsin Attorney General (1958, 1960) ===
Wisconsin Attorney General Election, 1958
Party	Candidate	Votes	%	±%
Democratic Primary, September 9, 1958
Democratic	John W. Reynolds	143,866	62.47%	
Democratic	Christ T. Seraphim	86,431	37.53%	
Plurality		57,435	24.94%	
Total votes		230,297	100.0%	
General Election, November 4, 1958
Democratic	John W. Reynolds	617,586	53.67%	+11.19%
Republican	Stewart G. Honeck (incumbent)	533,131	46.33%	−7.98%
Plurality		84,455	7.34%	-4.50%
Total votes		1,150,717	100.0%	-22.40%
Democratic gain from Republican		Swing	19.17%	

Wisconsin Attorney General Election, 1960
Party	Candidate	Votes	%	±%
General Election, November 8, 1960
Democratic	John W. Reynolds (incumbent)	841,445	50.89%	−2.78%
Republican	George Thompson	811,959	49.11%	
Plurality		29,486	1.78%	-5.56%
Total votes		1,653,404	100.0%	+43.68%
Democratic hold				

=== Wisconsin Governor (1962, 1964) ===
Wisconsin Gubernatorial Election, 1962
Party	Candidate	Votes	%	±%
General Election, November 6, 1962
Democratic	John W. Reynolds	637,491	50.36%	−1.20%
Republican	Philip G. Kuehn	625,536	49.41%	+0.97%
Independent	Adolf Wiggert	2,477	0.20%	
	Scattering	396	0.03%	
Plurality		11,955	0.94%	-2.17%
Total votes		1,265,900	100.0%	-26.74%
Democratic hold				

Wisconsin Gubernatorial Election, 1964
Party	Candidate	Votes	%	±%
Democratic Primary, September 8, 1964
Democratic	John W. Reynolds (incumbent)	241,170	70.26%	
Democratic	Dominic H. Frinzi	102,066	29.74%	
Plurality		139,104	40.53%	
Total votes		343,236	100.0%	
General Election, November 3, 1964
Republican	Warren P. Knowles	856,779	50.55%	+1.14%
Democratic	John W. Reynolds (incumbent)	837,901	49.44%	−0.92%
	Scattering	207	0.01%	
Plurality		18,878	1.11%	+0.17%
Total votes		1,694,887	100.0%	+33.89%
Republican gain from Democratic		Swing	2.06%	

Party political offices
Preceded by Robert LaFollette Sucher	Democratic nominee for Attorney General of Wisconsin; 1958, 1960	Succeeded by William H. Evans
Preceded by Gaylord Nelson	Democratic nominee for Governor of Wisconsin; 1962, 1964	Succeeded by Patrick Lucey
Political offices
Preceded by Gaylord Nelson	Governor of Wisconsin; 1963 – 1965	Succeeded by Warren P. Knowles
Legal offices
Preceded by Stewart G. Honeck	Attorney General of Wisconsin; 1959 – 1963	Succeeded by George Thompson
Preceded by Kenneth Philip Grubb	Judge of the United States District Court for the Eastern District of Wisconsin; 1965 – 1986	Succeeded by Joseph Peter Stadtmueller
Preceded by Robert Emmet Tehan	Chief Judge of the United States District Court for the Eastern District of Wisconsin; 1971 – 1986	Succeeded by Robert W. Warren
