= 1930 Wisconsin Supreme Court special election =

- April 1, 1930
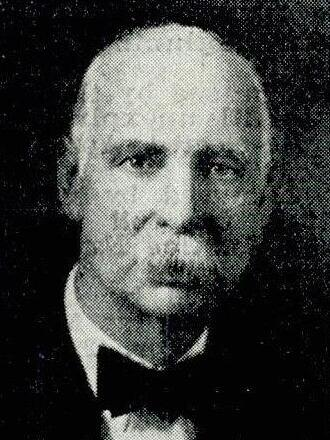

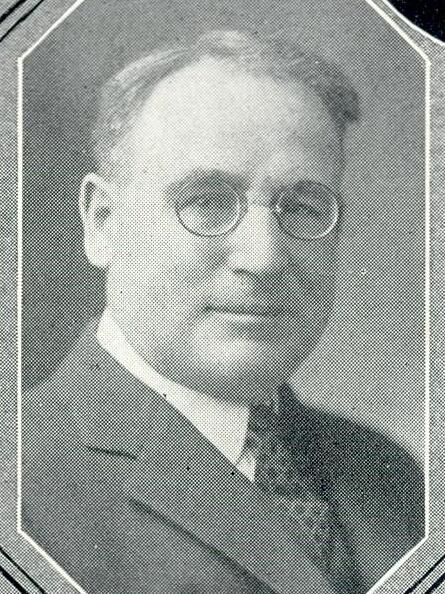

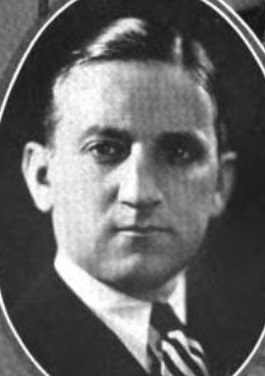
Candidate	Chester A. Fowler	John W. Reynolds Sr.	Raymond J. Cannon
Popular vote	198,572	184,317	96,908
Percentage	41.39%	38.42%	20.20%
- Fowler: 30–40% 40–50% 50–60% 60–70% 70–80% Reynolds: 30–40% 40–50% 50–60% 60–70% 70–80% Cannon: 30–40% 40–50%
Justice before election
Chester A. Fowler
Elected Justice
Chester A. Fowler

The 1930 Wisconsin Supreme Court special election was a special election held on Tuesday, April 1, 1930, to elect a justice to the Wisconsin Supreme Court. Incumbent justice Chester A. Fowler (appointed to fill a vacancy after the death on the bench of Aad J. Vinje) won election to the remainder of Vinje's term, defeating two challengers.

== Background ==
Incumbent justice Chester A. Fowler had been appointed by Governor Walter J. Kohler Sr. in April 1929 to fill the vacancy created by the death of Justice Aad J. Vinje. Being 66 years of age when appointed, Fowler was the court's oldest judge.

== Candidates ==
- Chester A. Fowler, incumbent justice (appointed in 1929), unsuccessful candidate in the 1916 Supreme Court election, former circuit court judge
- Raymond J. Cannon, attorney and former baseball player
- John W. Reynolds Sr., Wisconsin attorney general

=== Ideologic leanings and political affiliations of candidates ===
Fowler was a conservative member of the Republican Party, and had been appointed by a governor who was similarly a conservative Republican. Reynolds was an ideological liberal, being a progressive member of the Republican Party aligned with the school of thought that had been championed in Wisconsin by Robert M. La Follette.

== Results ==
1930 Wisconsin Supreme Court special election
Party	Candidate	Votes	%	±%
General election (April 1, 1930)
Nonpartisan	Chester A. Fowler (incumbent)	198,572	41.39	
Nonpartisan	John W. Reynolds Sr.	184,317	38.42	
Nonpartisan	Raymond J. Cannon	96,908	20.20	
	Scattering	433	0.09	
Plurality		14,255	2.97	
Total votes		480,230	100	
