= West Jacksonport, Wisconsin =

- Unincorporated community
- Location within the state of Wisconsin
- Coordinates: 45°1′N 87°13′W
- Country: United States
- State: Wisconsin
- County: Door
- Town: Jacksonport
- Time zone: UTC-6 (Central (CST))
  - Summer (DST): UTC-5 (CDT)
- Area code: 920

West Jacksonport is a small unincorporated community located in Door County, Wisconsin, United States. The community is located at the intersection of County Highway V and County Highway T, in the center of the Door Peninsula, in the town of Jacksonport.

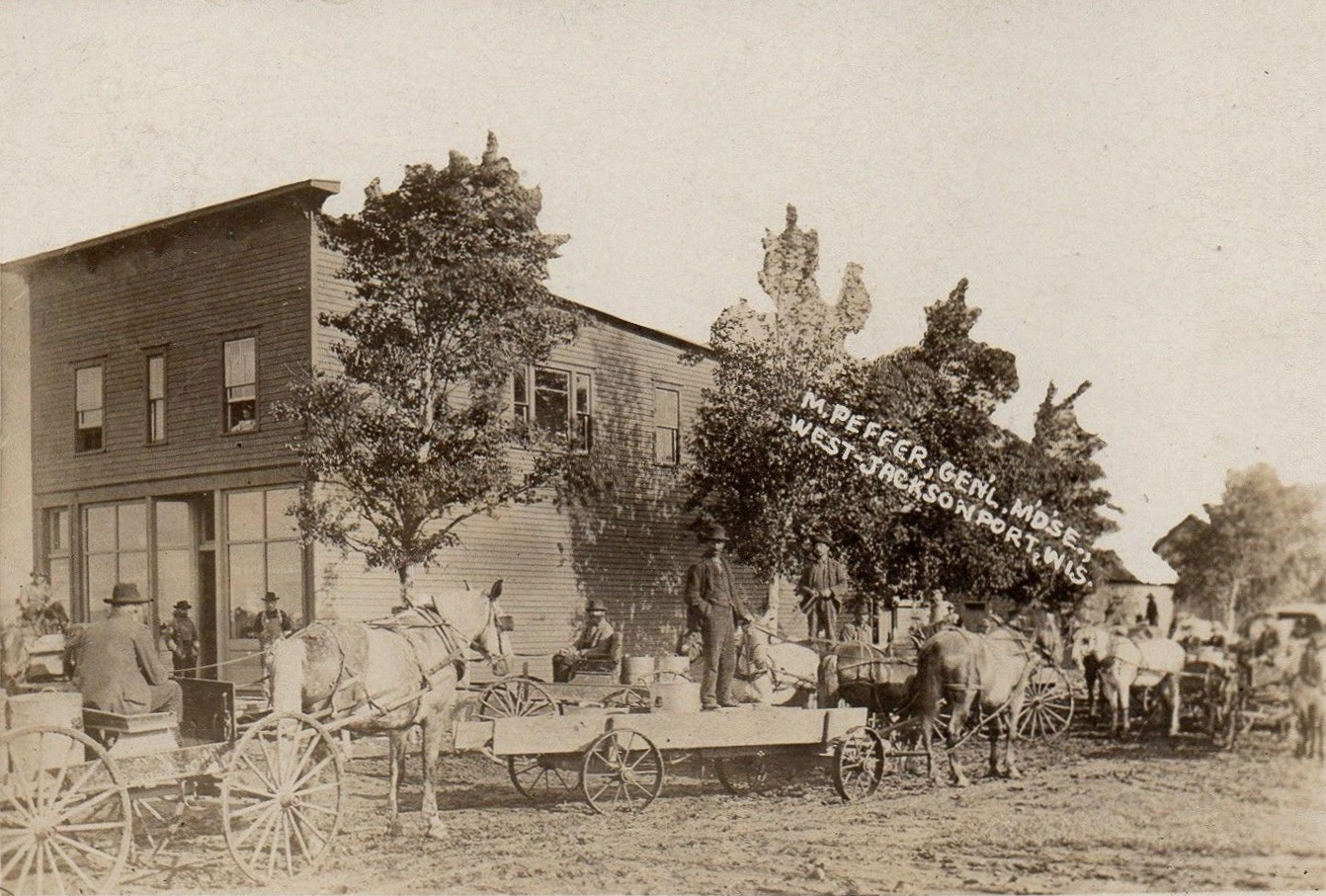
M. Peffer General Merchandise in West Jacksonport; from a postcard postmarked in 1908
