= Jacksonport, Wisconsin =

- Town
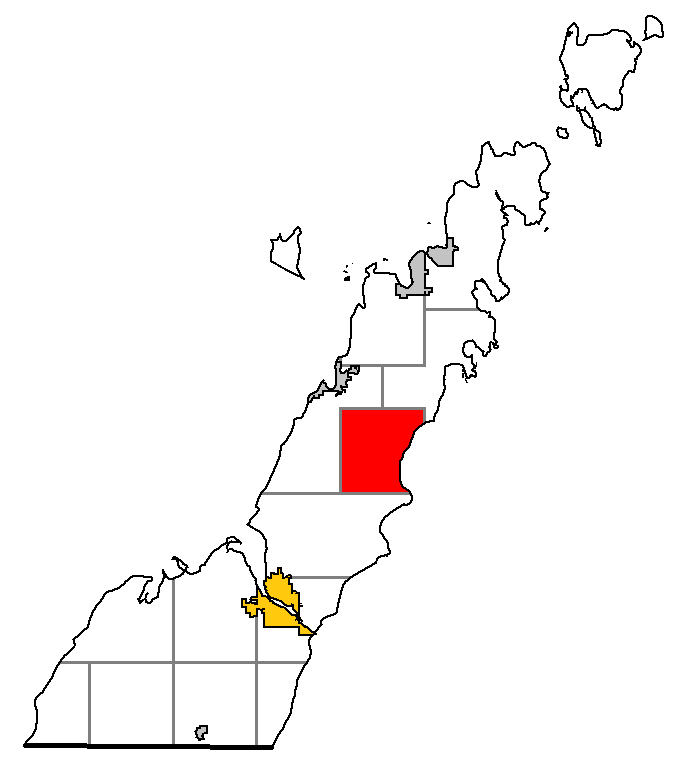
- Location of Jacksonport, within Door County
- Coordinates: 44°58′34″N 87°12′46″W
- Country: United States
- State: Wisconsin
- County: Door

Area
  - Total: 58.3 sq mi (151.0 km^{2})
  - Land: 29.0 sq mi (75.2 km^{2})
  - Water: 29.3 sq mi (75.8 km^{2})
- Elevation: 584 ft (178 m)

Population (2020)
  - Total: 878
  - Density: 30.2/sq mi (11.7/km^{2})
- Time zone: UTC-6 (Central (CST))
  - Summer (DST): UTC-5 (CDT)
- Area code: 920
- FIPS code: 55-37750
- GNIS feature ID: 1583445
- Website: https://jacksonportwi.gov/

Jacksonport is a town in Door County, Wisconsin, United States. The population was 878 at the 2020 census. The unincorporated communities of Jacksonport and West Jacksonport are located in the town. Part of Clark Lake is in the Town of Jacksonport.

== Geography ==
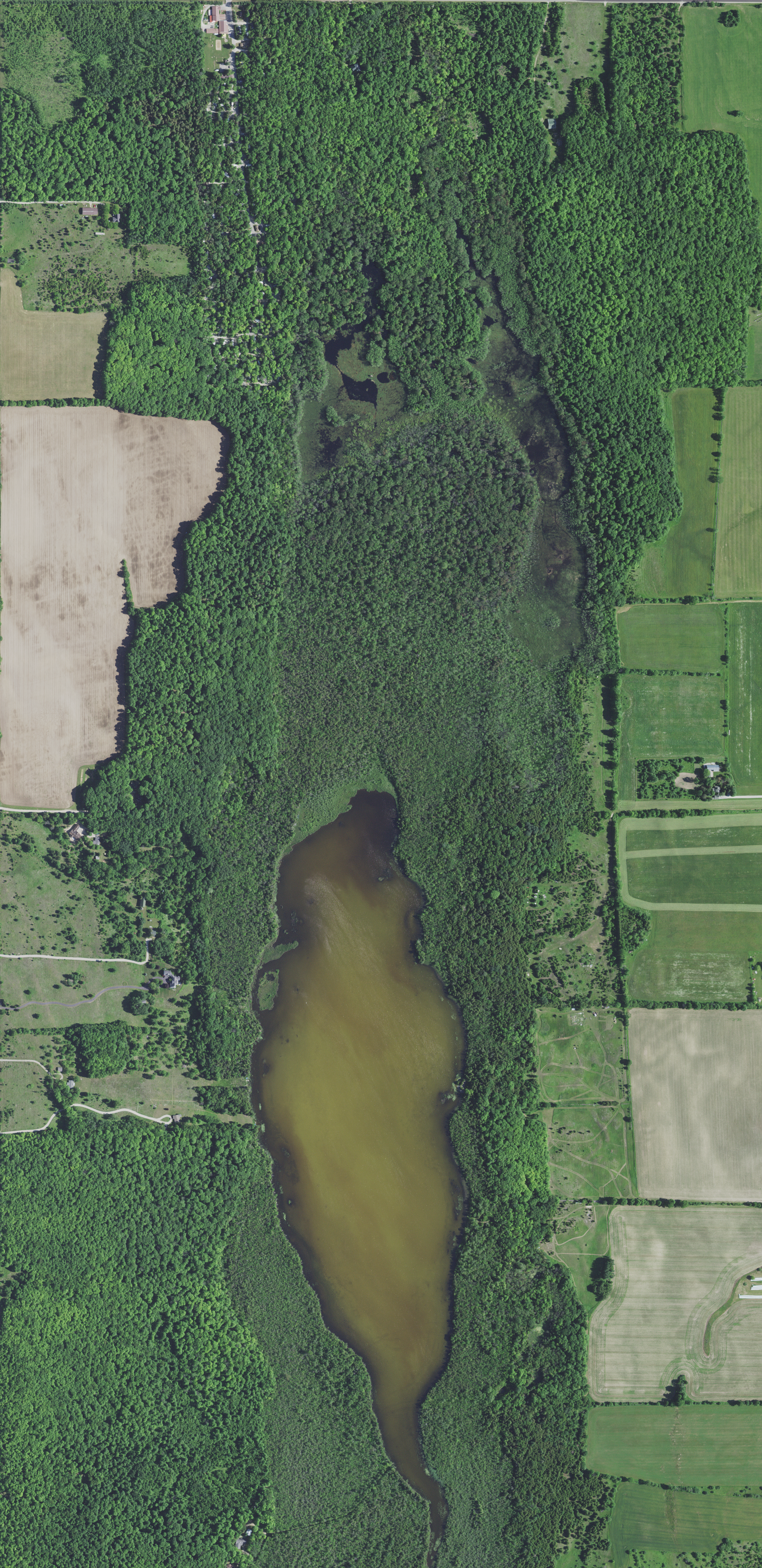
Aerial view of northwestern Jacksonport, including Lost Lake

According to the United States Census Bureau, the town has a total area of 58.3 square miles (151.0 km^{2}), of which 29.0 square miles (75.2 km^{2}) is land and 29.3 square miles (75.8 km^{2}) (50.19%) is water.

The site of what is now Jacksonport was once a Potawatomi village called Medemoya-Seebe, or "old woman's creek".

Lost Lake is located in northwestern Jacksonport. The lake is open to the public, but can only be accessed through Logan Creek.

=== Climate ===
Lost Lake

Climate chart (precipitation, max. and min. temperature)
J	F	M	A	M	J	J	A	S	O	N	D
57 −9 −12	54 −7 −11	60 0 −7	129 9 −1	93 16 3	85 20 9	97 24 16	78 23 13	87 19 12	129 10 4	85 2 −2	65 −3 −6
- █ Average max. and min. temperatures in °C
- █ Precipitation totals in mm
Imperial conversion
J	F	M	A	M	J	J	A	S	O	N	D
2.2 16 10	2.1 19 12	2.4 32 19	5.1 48 30	3.7 61 37	3.3 68 48	3.8 75 61	3.1 73 55	3.4 66 54	5.1 50 39	3.3 36 28	2.6 27 21
- █ Average max. and min. temperatures in °F
- █ Precipitation totals in inches

== Demographics ==
As of the census of 2000, there were 738 people, 304 households, and 216 families residing in the town. The population density was 25.4 people per square mile (9.8/km^{2}). There were 638 housing units at an average density of 22.0 per square mile (8.5/km^{2}). The racial makeup of the town was 97.43% White, 0.95% Asian, 0.54% from other races, and 1.08% from two or more races. Hispanic or Latino of any race were 1.49% of the population.

There were 304 households, out of which 26.3% had children under the age of 18 living with them, 63.2% were married couples living together, 4.9% had a female householder with no husband present, and 28.9% were non-families. 23.7% of all households were made up of individuals, and 9.9% had someone living alone who was 65 years of age or older. The average household size was 2.43 and the average family size was 2.91.

In the town, the population was spread out, with 23.4% under the age of 18, 4.2% from 18 to 24, 25.3% from 25 to 44, 29.5% from 45 to 64, and 17.5% who were 65 years of age or older. The median age was 43 years. For every 100 females, there were 110.3 males. For every 100 females age 18 and over, there were 102.5 males.

The median income for a household in the town was $42,404, and the median income for a family was $46,912. Males had a median income of $30,795 versus $19,926 for females. The per capita income for the town was $20,493. About 3.2% of families and 3.4% of the population were below the poverty line, including 1.9% of those under age 18 and 1.5% of those age 65 or over.

== Notable people ==
- Charles Reynolds, Wisconsin State Representative
- Thomas Reynolds, Wisconsin State Representative

== Gallery ==
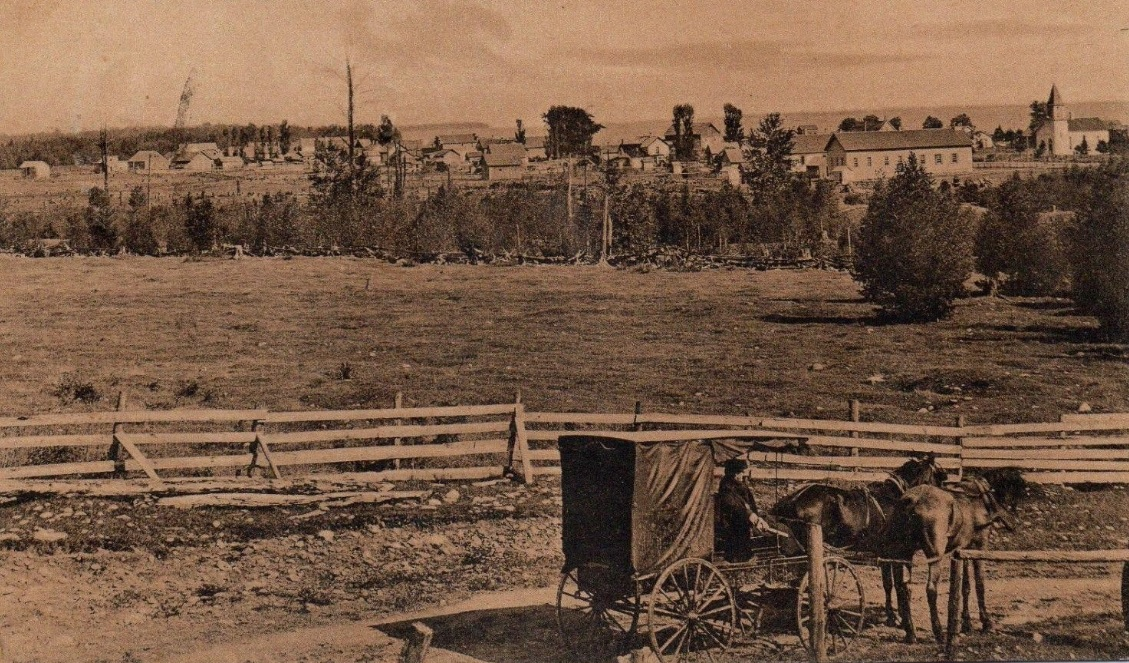
Jacksonport; from a postcard postmarked in 1908

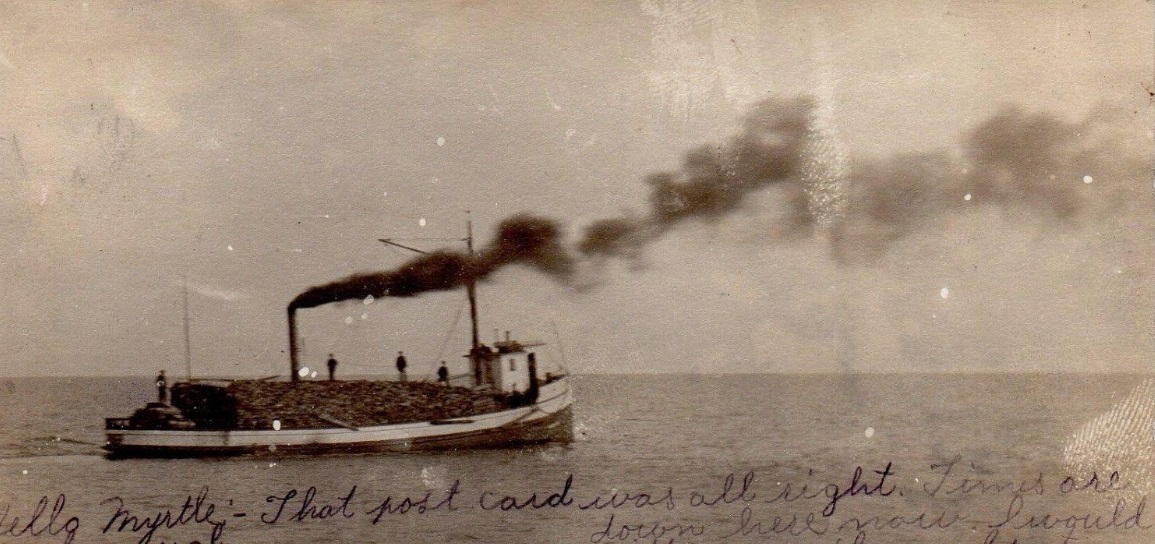
The steam barge Addie Wade outbound from Jacksonport with a cargo of logs; from a postcard postmarked in 1906

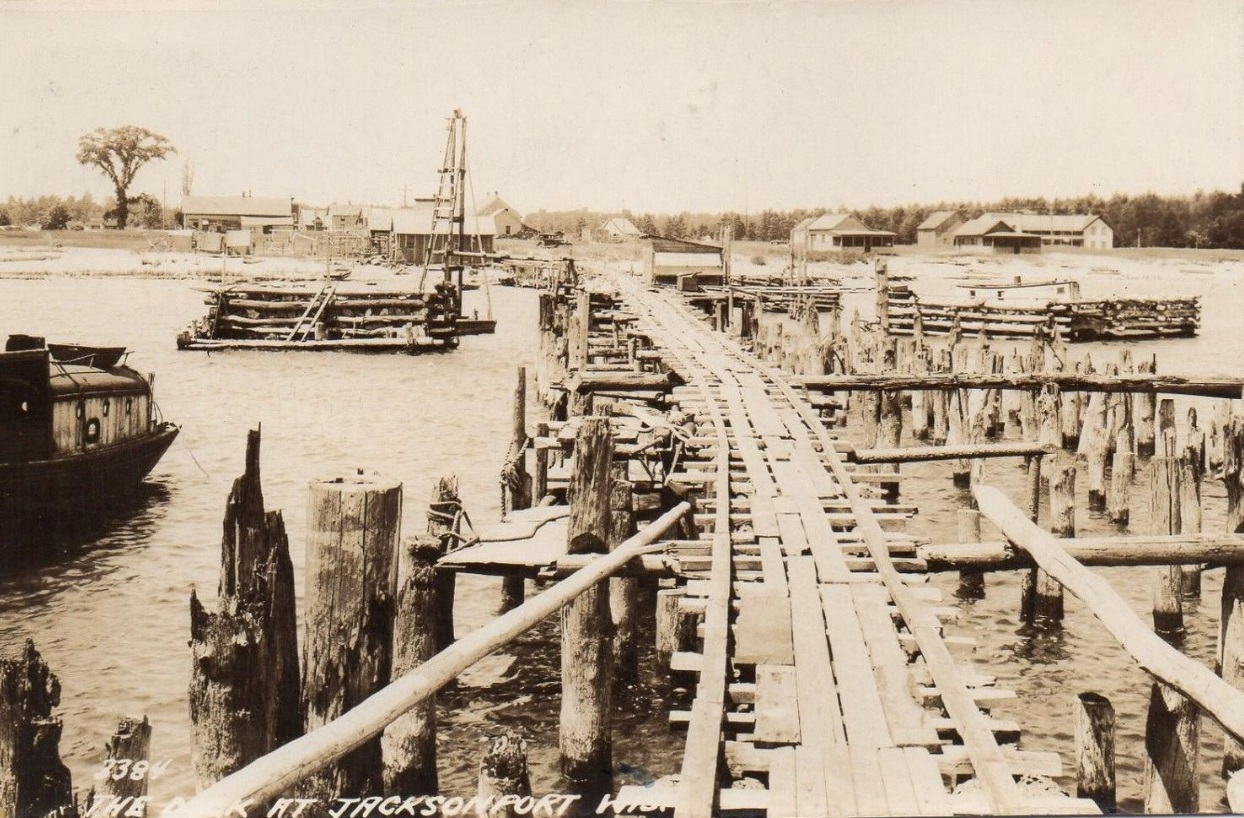
Dock at Jacksonport, postmarked 1937

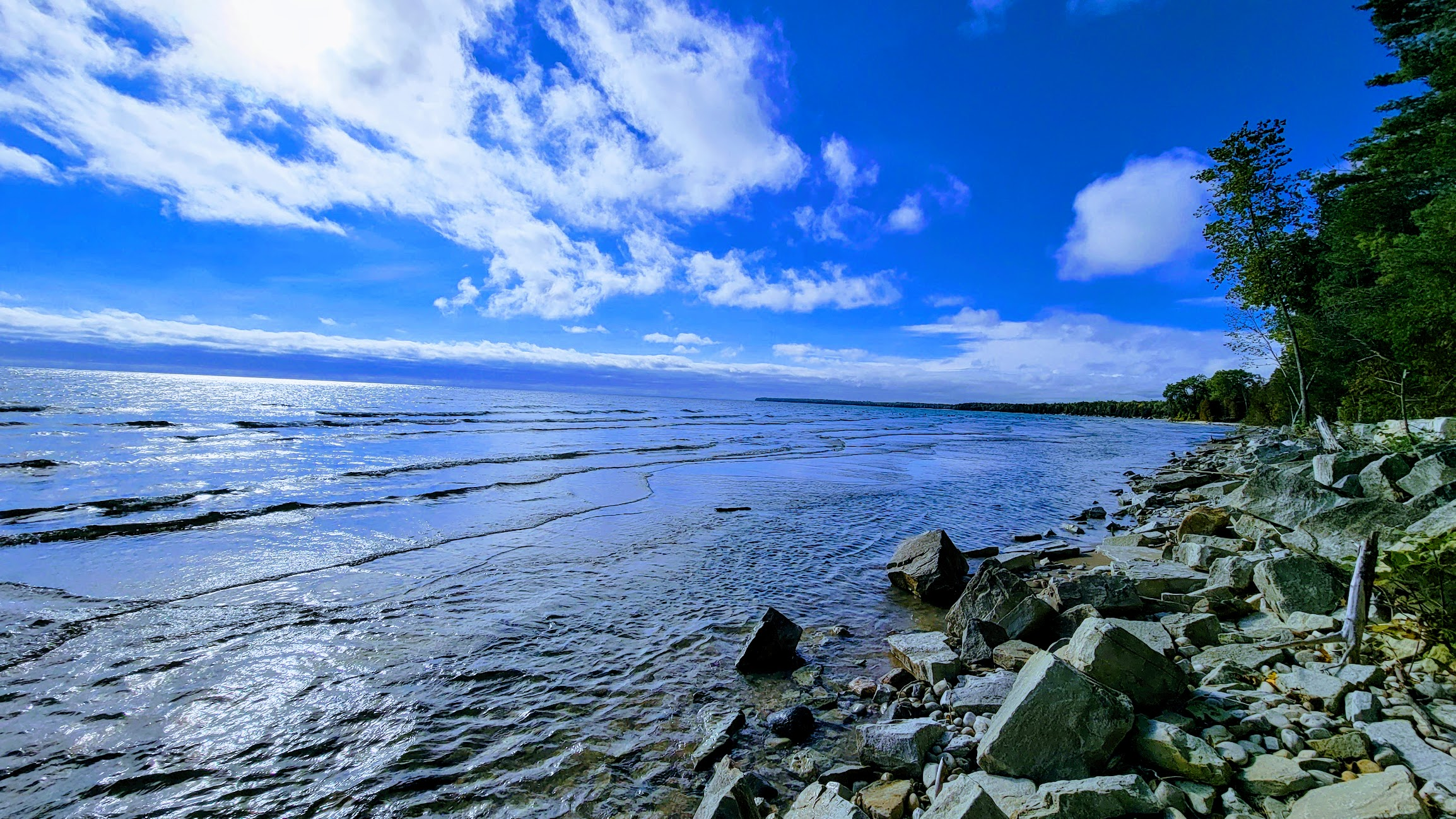
Jacksonport shoreline, 2021
