= 2020 Wisconsin Supreme Court election =

- April 7, 2020
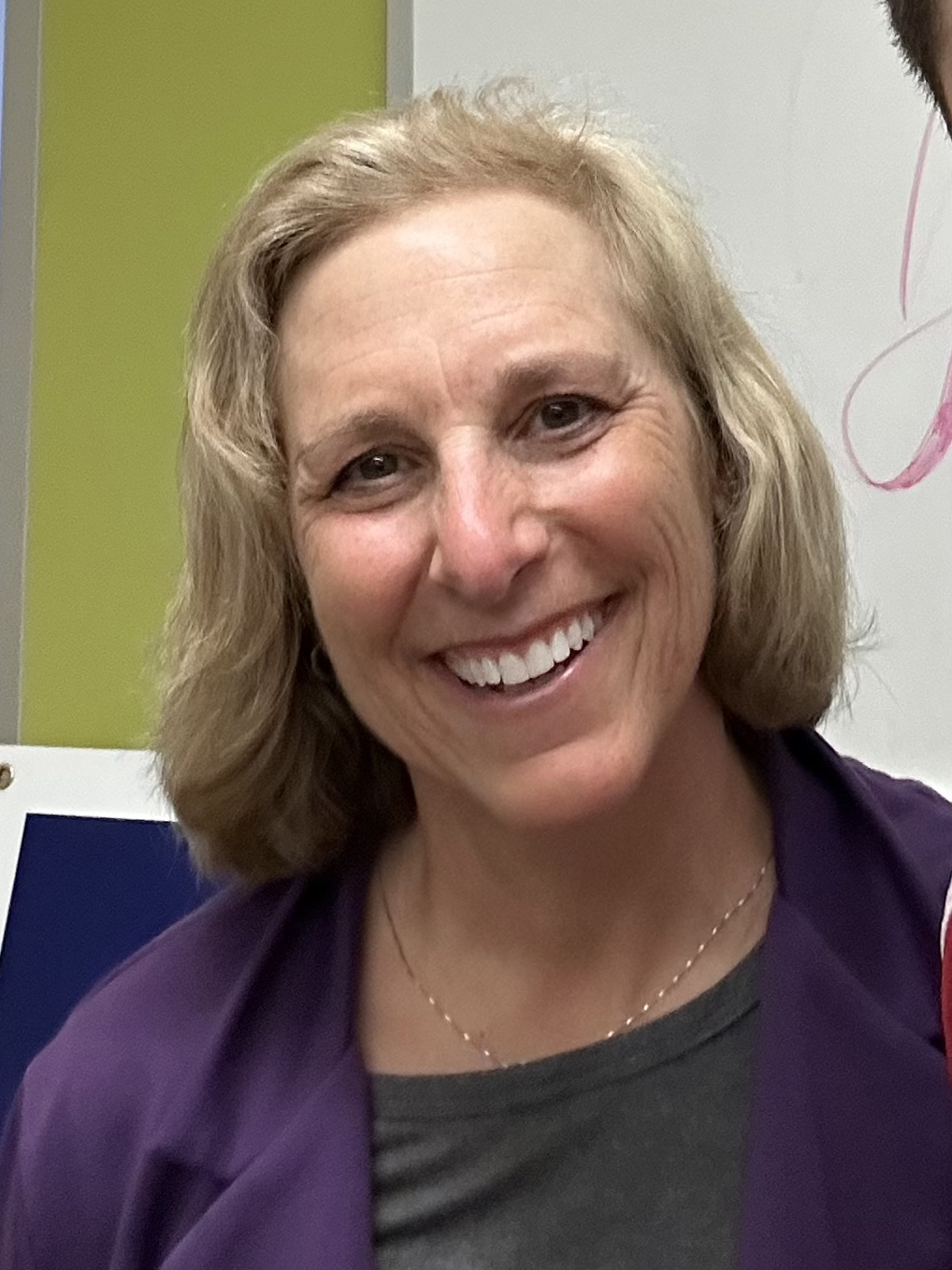

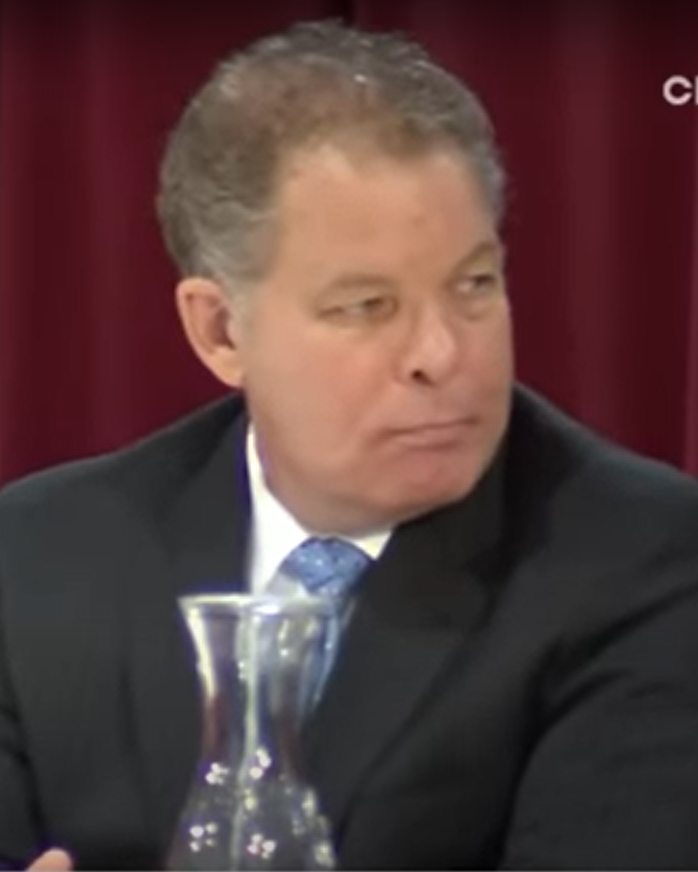
Candidate	Jill Karofsky	Daniel Kelly
Popular vote	855,573	693,134
Percentage	55.21%	44.73%
- County results Karofsky: 50–60% 60–70% 80–90% Kelly: 50–60% 60–70%
Justice before election
Daniel Kelly
Elected Justice
Jill Karofsky

The 2020 Wisconsin Supreme Court election was held on April 7, 2020, to elect a justice of the Wisconsin Supreme Court for a ten-year term. Dane County circuit judge Jill Karofsky defeated incumbent justice Daniel Kelly, shifting the ideology of the court toward liberals.

As more than two candidates filed to run, a nonpartisan primary was held on February 18, 2020. In the primary, university professor Edward A. Fallone was eliminated.

The general election took place during the initial surge of the COVID-19 pandemic in the United States, and state Republicans' controversially opposed postponing the spring elections (a move largely seen as having designs of benefitting Kelly through depressed turnout). Karofsky's sizable win was only the second instance since the 1960s in which an incumbent justice of the court was defeated. While the election was formally nonpartisan, its general election result was viewed as a win for the Democratic Party, while Kelly was a conservative backed by the Republican Party (and who had been endorsed by incumbent U.S. President Donald Trump, a Republican).

== Background ==
Incumbent David Prosser Jr. was re-elected to a second ten-year term in 2011, with that term expiring in 2021. Prosser resigned from the court on July 31, 2016, and Daniel Kelly was appointed by Governor Scott Walker on August 1. The Constitution of Wisconsin stipulates that early elections to full terms can be triggered by a resignation, but that it is impermissible for more than one seat to be up for election in the same year. Since there were elections scheduled between 2016–2019, the resignation moved the election to the next possible date, 2020.

After Governor Tony Evers defeated then-incumbent Governor Scott Walker in 2018, the Republican-controlled Legislature proposed a bill moving the 2020 presidential primary to February instead of being held on the same day as the spring general election in April. Republicans feared the increased turnout of the 2020 Democratic presidential primary, would negatively effect incumbent Justice Daniel Kelly. The proposed bill ultimately died in committee.

== Appointment ==
=== Appointee ===
- Daniel Kelly, attorney

=== Considered but not appointed ===
- Michael B. Brennan, chairman of Governor Walker's Judicial Advisory Selection Committee
- Andrew Brown, attorney
- Claude Covelli, attorney
- Mark Gundrum, Wisconsin Court of Appeals judge for the Second District
- Brian Hagedorn, then-Wisconsin Court of Appeals judge for the Second District
- Thomas Hruz, Wisconsin Court of Appeals judge for the Third District
- Randy R. Koschnick, former chief justice of the Third District circuit court (2013–2017)
- James A. Morrison, judge of the Marinette County Circuit (Branch 2)
- Ellen Nowak, former secretary of the Wisconsin Department of Administration (2018–2019)
- Paul Scoptur, attorney
- Jim Troupis, former judge of the Dane County Circuit (Branch 3) (2015–2016)

== Primary election ==
=== Candidates ===
==== Advanced ====
- Jill Karofsky, judge of the Dane County Circuit Court (Branch 12)
- Daniel Kelly, incumbent justice of the Wisconsin Supreme Court

==== Eliminated in primary ====
- Edward A. Fallone, Marquette University law professor and candidate for Wisconsin Supreme Court in 2013

=== Endorsements ===
Ed Fallone

County officials

- John Chisholm, Milwaukee County district attorney (Democratic)

Judicial officials

- Joe Donald, judge of the Wisconsin Court of Appeals
- Janet Protasiewicz, judge of the Milwaukee County Circuit Court

Labor unions

- UFCW Local 1473

Newspapers and other media

- The Shepherd Express (co-endorsement with Jill Karofsky)

Organizations

- Black Leaders Organizing in Communities
- Voces de la Frontera
- Wisconsin Hispanic Lawyers Association
- Wisconsin Justice Initiative Action
- Wisconsin Muslim Civic Alliance
Jill Karofsky

Judicial officials

- Rebecca Dallet, justice of the Wisconsin Supreme Court

State officials

- Jim Doyle, former governor of Wisconsin (2003–2011) (Democratic)
- Tony Earl, former governor of Wisconsin (1983–1987) (Democratic)
- Martin J. Schreiber, former governor of Wisconsin (1977–1979) (Democratic)

Labor unions

- IBEW Wisconsin State Conference
- Madison Teachers, Inc.

Newspapers and other media

- The Shepherd Express (co-endorsement with Ed Fallone)

Organizations

- Women LEAD
Daniel Kelly

Federal officials

- Donald Trump, president of the United States (Republican)

Judicial officials

- Rebecca Bradley, justice of the Wisconsin Supreme Court
- Brian Hagedorn, justice of the Wisconsin Supreme Court
- David Prosser, former justice of the Wisconsin Supreme Court (1998–2016)
- Jon Wilcox, former justice of the Wisconsin Supreme Court (1992–2007)

Labor unions

- Milwaukee Police Association

Organizations

- National Rifle Association Political Victory Fund
- Pro-Life Wisconsin PAC
- Wisconsin Family Action PAC
- Wisconsin Realtors Association
- Wisconsin Right to Life PAC

=== Forums ===
2020 Wisconsin Supreme Court candidate forums
No.	Date	Host	Moderator	Link	Candidates		
Key: P Participant A Absent N Not invited I Invited W Withdrawn							
Key: P Participant A Absent N Not invited I Invited W Withdrawn					Daniel Kelly	Ed Fallone	Jill Karofsky
1	November 19, 2019	American Constitution Society	Michael Wagner		P	P	P
2	January 30, 2020	Milwaukee Bar Association	Steve Walters		P	P	P
3	February 4, 2020	Grassroots North Shore	Keith Schmitz		N	P	P

=== Primary results ===
Primary results by county: Kelly: Kelly 40–50%; Kelly 50–60%; Kelly 60–70%; Kelly 70–80%; Karofsky: Karofsky 40–50%; Karofsky 50–60%; Karofsky 60–70%

2020 Wisconsin Supreme Court primary election
Candidate	Votes	%
Daniel Kelly (incumbent)	352,876	50.04%
Jill Karofsky	261,783	37.13%
Edward A. Fallone	89,184	12.65%
Write-in	1,295	0.18%
Total votes	705,138	100.0%

== General election ==
=== COVID-19 pandemic, efforts to postpone election and Republican resistance ===
The election took place in the state's spring elections, which also included the state's presidential primaries. The outbreak of the COVID–19 pandemic in the United States occurred in the weeks prior to the spring election. Following the outbreak, several other states had delayed their presidential primaries and extended their vote-by-mail periods, since concerns were raised by health officials, poll workers, and voters that in-person voting at this early height of the pandemic would be unsafe for vulnerable individuals. There were calls for Wisconsin to act similarly, but state Republicans opposed this. It was widely believed that state Republicans' objections to postponing the primaries was to advantage Kelly in the court election; with Republicans believed to have hedged that having the election proceeded as-scheduled and without emergency accommodations would depress voter turnout (particularly among liberal-leaning and Democratic-leaning voters), and that a lower-turnout election would be to Prosser's advantage.

Wisconsin Governor Tony Evers (a Democrat) initially signed an executive order for the spring elections to be conducting exclusively by mail-in voting. However, this order was rejected by the Republican-controlled Wisconsin Legislature. In a ruling issued on April 2, U.S. District Court Judge William M. Conley refused requests to postpone the election, but extended the deadline for absentee voting to April 13 (ordering clerks not to release any election data before that date). However, on April 6, the Supreme Court of the United States overturned Conley's decision by a 5–4 vote, meaning that all absentee ballots had to be postmarked by "election day, Tuesday, April 7" even though it was still acceptable for the ballots to be received by the clerks as late as April 13. The Supreme Court of the United States "did not alter the provision in Conley's amended order which prohibits the reporting of results until April 13". On April 4, Governor Evers called a special session of the state legislature to be held on April 6 for the purposes of having them vote to postpone the spring election. However, this special session ended within minutes of convening and without any action, thus forcing the election to go on as planned. Despite having previously expressed the view that he lacked the power to postpone the elections by executive order, on April 6, Evers issued an executive order which would have postponed the April 7 elections until the tentative date of June 9. Republican leaders immediately challenged the Governor's Executive Order in the Wisconsin Supreme Court. The Wisconsin Supreme Court subsequently ruled 4–2 that Evers did not have the authority to postpone the election. Justice Ann Walsh Bradley, joined by Justice Rebecca Dallet, authored a dissent, attacking the majority’s decision as forcing voters into an unacceptable choice between their health and their right to vote during an unprecedented public health crisis. Justice A.W. Bradley also criticized the majority for ignoring both common sense and public health warnings, asserting that the ruling will disenfranchise voters and needlessly endanger public safety, thereby undermining democratic participation.

Voting was somewhat chaotic, with people waiting in the rain for hours in some cases in masks and social distancing. However, by the time the election concluded, Milwaukee Election Commissioner Neil Albrecht stated that despite some of the problems, the in-person voting ran smoothly.

=== Campaign ===
During the campaign, Karofsky criticized Kelly and other members of the court's conservative majority for majority opinions that she argued gave them the appearance of being beholden to special interests. She also criticized Kelly and other conservative justices for having made comments that she characterized as unbefitting of judges. Karofsky's comments prompted the conservative court majority to issue statements characterizing them as "baseless insults".

Kelly was backed by the state's Republican Party, and was endorsed by Republican incumbent U.S. President Donald Trump.

=== Post-primary endorsements ===
Jill Karofsky

Federal officials

- Tammy Baldwin, U.S. senator from Wisconsin (Democratic)
- Joe Biden, 47th vice president of the United States (2009–2017) (Democratic)
- Bernie Sanders, U.S. senator from Vermont (Independent)

Judicial officials

- Ann Walsh Bradley, justice of the Wisconsin Supreme Court
- Louis Butler, former justice of the Wisconsin Supreme Court (2004–2008)

State officials

- Josh Kaul, attorney general of Wisconsin (Democratic)

Labor unions

- WI AFL-CIO

Newspapers and other media

- The Cap Times
- The Shepherd Express

Organizations

- Citizen Action
- Human Rights Campaign
Daniel Kelly

County officials

- 43 current and retired county sheriffs

Organizations

- NFIB Wisconsin PAC
Declined to endorse

Newspapers and other media

- Wisconsin State Journal

=== Forum ===
2020 Wisconsin Supreme Court candidate forum (post-primary)
No.	Date	Host	Moderator	Link	Candidates	
Key: P Participant A Absent N Not invited I Invited W Withdrawn						
Key: P Participant A Absent N Not invited I Invited W Withdrawn					Daniel Kelly	Jill Karofsky
1	March 12, 2020	Milwaukee Bar Association	Steve Walters		P	P

=== Polling ===
Poll source	Date(s) administered	Sample size (Note: Key: A – all adults RV – registered voters LV – likely voters V – unclear)	Margin of error	Daniel Kelly	Jill Karofsky	Undecided
Hodas & Associates (R) (Note: The Restoration PAC is a 501 non-profit which supported Donald Trump's 2020 presidential campaign.)	March 17–19, 2020	600 (RV)	–	36%	29%	—

=== Results ===
2020 Wisconsin Supreme Court election
Candidate	Votes	%
Jill Karofsky	855,573	55.21%
Daniel Kelly (incumbent)	693,134	44.73%
Write-in	990	0.06%
Total votes	1,549,697	100.0%

== Aftermath ==
=== Analysis ===
Karofsky's sizable win was regarded to be an immense upset victory. Several political pundits noted that rather than depress Democratic and liberal voter turnout, the highly-public maneuvering by state Republicans to prevent a postponement of the election had motivated Democrats to turn out for Karofsky. Additionally, the results of the election largely mirrored the total votes cast in the presidential primaries held on the same day, with Democrats getting a combined 925,065 votes in the contested Democratic primary, and Republicans getting 630,196 votes in their uncontested primary.

While the election was formally nonpartisan, the result of the general election was regarded as a victory for the Democratic Party, as the liberal Democratic Party-backed Karofsky defeated the conservative Republican Party-backed Daniel Kelly (who had been endorsed by Trump). The outcome narrowed the court's conservative majority from 5–2 to 4–3. This was the first time since 2008 that an incumbent justice was unseated, and only the second time since 1967. 2020 was only the eighth instance in which an incumbent justice lost re-election to the court (after 1855, 1908, 1917, 1947, 1958, 1967, and 2008).

This outcome differed from the preceding 2019 state supreme court election, in which a conservative candidate had narrowly prevailed over a liberal candidate for another of the court's seats. However, the outcome and vote share resembled the supreme court result of 2018 despite the two elections having different levels of turnout. Similar to both 2020 and 2018, both of the two supreme court elections to be held since (2023 and 2025) have also had results in which a liberal candidate has defeated a conservative candidate by a vote share of roughly 55% to 45%, despite there being variance in overall turnout between the four elections.

As of 2026, this is the most recent instance in which an incumbent Wisconsin Supreme Court justice ran for re-election.
