= 2023 Wisconsin Supreme Court election =

- April 4, 2023
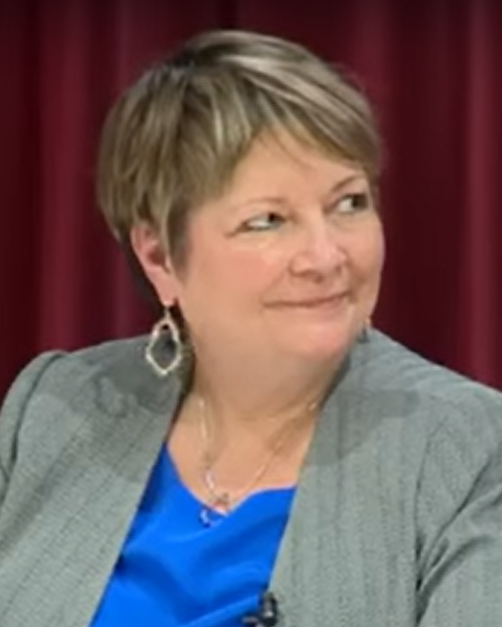

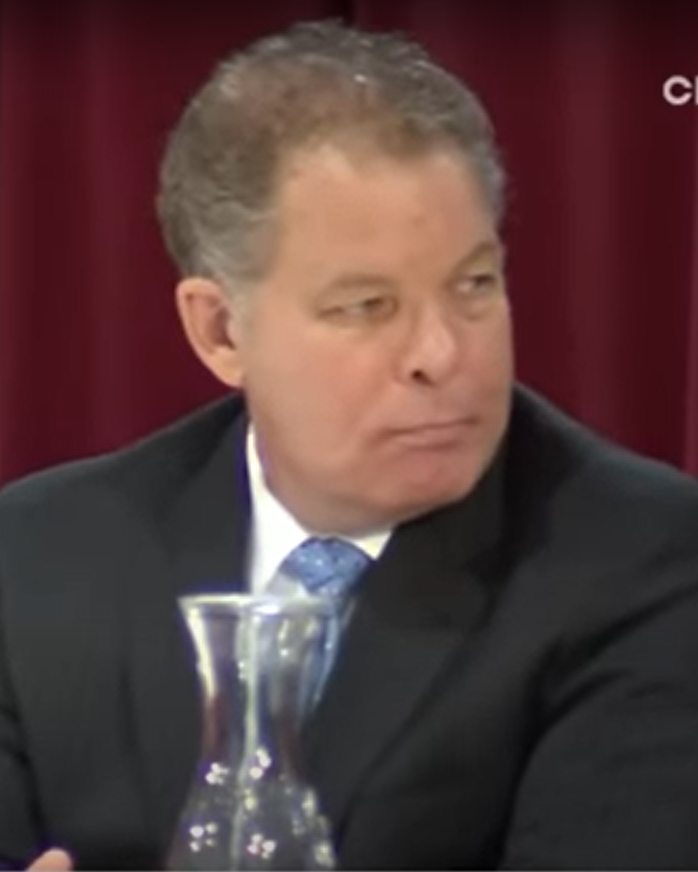
Candidate	Janet Protasiewicz	Daniel Kelly
Popular vote	1,021,822	818,391
Percentage	55.43%	44.39%
- Protasiewicz: 50–60% 60–70% 70–80% 80–90% >90% Kelly: 50–60% 60–70% 70–80% 80–90% >90% Tie: 50%
Justice before election
Patience Roggensack
Elected Justice
Janet Protasiewicz

The 2023 Wisconsin Supreme Court election was held on Tuesday, April 4, 2023, to elect a justice to the Wisconsin Supreme Court for a ten-year term. Milwaukee County Circuit Judge Janet Protasiewicz defeated former Wisconsin Supreme Court Justice Daniel Kelly, effectively flipping the ideological balance of the court from a conservative to liberal majority.

Incumbent justice Patience D. Roggensack chose to retire after 20 years on the court; she had identified as a conservative and voted consistently with the conservative 4–3 majority on the court. Protasiewicz and Kelly advanced from the February 21 nonpartisan primary, receiving 46% and 24% of the votes, respectively. Although Wisconsin Supreme Court justices are officially nonpartisan, Kelly was identified as being the Republican-aligned candidate and Protasiewicz the Democratic-aligned candidate. Other candidates in the 2023 primary included conservative Waukesha County circuit judge Jennifer Dorow and liberal Dane County circuit judge Everett Mitchell.

The race was widely considered to be a de facto referendum on legal abortion access in Wisconsin, but election coverage also often focused on how the court would rule on future cases involving politically charged issues of voting rights and redistricting. This election also took place in the aftermath of Donald Trump's false claims of fraud in the 2020 presidential election, with some national journalism focusing on how the outcome of the election could decide how the court would rule if a similar attempt were made to overturn the 2024 election. This was described as the most important 2023 U.S. election; it was the most expensive judicial race to that point in U.S. history, with over $45 million ultimately spent. (Note: Spending on the 2025 Wisconsin Supreme Court election ultimately surpassed 2023 by a significant margin.) (Note: Previously, the most expensive judicial race in history was a 2004 Illinois Supreme Court election in which over $15 million was spent. Adjusted for inflation, the spending in that race totaled over $24 million. The 2015 Pennsylvania Supreme Court election saw $15.8 million spent, but the inflation-adjusted value was just $21 million.) Wisconsin Democratic Party chair Ben Wikler called it "the most important election nobody's ever heard of."

Protasiewicz won the election by 11.02 percentage points, which flipped the court to a liberal majority. Kelly lost by a slightly wider margin than his own defeat three years prior. Protasiewicz took office on August 1, 2023. The election was exceeded in campaign spending and voter turnout two years later in the 2025 Wisconsin Supreme Court election.

== Primary election ==
=== Candidates ===
==== Advanced ====
- Daniel Kelly, former justice of the Wisconsin Supreme Court (2016–2020)
- Janet Protasiewicz, judge of the Milwaukee County Circuit Court (Branch 24)

==== Eliminated in primary ====
- Jennifer Dorow, judge of the Waukesha County Circuit Court (Branch 2)
- Everett Mitchell, judge of the Dane County Circuit Court (Branch 4)

=== Fundraising ===
Campaign finance reports as of February 13, 2023
Candidate	Raised	Spent	Cash on hand
Jennifer Dorow	$756,000	$405,056	$267,133
Daniel Kelly	$467,000	$229,000	$202,000
Everett Mitchell	$223,000	$103,000	$121,000
Janet Protasiewicz	$2,200,000	$735,000	$277,000

=== Advertising ===
On January 20, 2023, Janet Protasiewicz became the first candidate to announce a purchase of TV ads, allocating $700,000 for ads to air in the three weeks leading up to the February 21 primary. The ads, which began airing on January 26, highlight Protasiewicz's support for abortion rights and feature women warning “extremists want to ban abortion. Even in cases of rape and health of the mother.” Fair Courts America, a conservative advocacy group funded by megadonors Richard and Elizabeth Uihlein, simultaneously spent $250,000 on radio ads in support of Daniel Kelly. Fair Courts America then launched a $500,000 TV ad campaign in support of Kelly on February 2. The ads warn “Madison liberals are trying to take over the Wisconsin Supreme Court. That’s why we need to elect conservative Justice Dan Kelly.” Fair Courts America later increased their advertising budget for Kelly to $2.4 million.

Also in early February, the progressive group A Better Wisconsin Together announced a purchase of ads opposing Jennifer Dorow, including $720,000 for TV ads and $110,000 for digital ads. They later increased their ad budget to $1.9 million. The ads accuse Dorow of having "a long history of keeping criminals, even sexual predators, out of prison." Daily Kos theorized that A Better Wisconsin Together, which is affiliated with the national group ProgressNow, believed that Dorow would be more difficult to defeat and was trying to prevent her from reaching the April general election. On the same day, Dorow announced her first TV ad campaign, a $60,000 buy highlighting her service in the trial of Darrell Brooks. Dorow later increased her ad spending to $400,000, and the advocacy group Conservative Action for America followed up with a $246,000 buy in support of her.

Protasiewicz released two additional ads on February 7 which stressed her support for fairness and public safety and poked fun at the difficulty of pronouncing her surname. (Note: The correct pronunciation of Protasiewicz is PRO-ta-SAY-witz.) Two conservative groups, Wisconsin Alliance for Reform and Wisconsin Manufacturers & Commerce, simultaneously spent a combined $770,000 on a commercial portraying Protasiewicz as weak on crime. Protasiewicz hit back on February 10 with an ad defending her history as a prosecutor and accusing Dorow and Kelly of representing child predators during their time as defense attorneys. This brought her total ad spending to $1.25 million. Protasiewicz's fundraising advantage allowed her to run an ad during the 2023 Super Bowl, the only candidate in the race to do so.

On February 14, Women Speak Out PAC, which is affiliated with Susan B. Anthony Pro-Life America, announced it would spend "six figures" on pro-Kelly ads highlighting his opposition to abortion. Kelly and Everett Mitchell did not air any ads themselves, and no outside groups ran ads in support of Mitchell. In total, over $9 million was spent in the primary.

=== Endorsements ===
Jennifer Dorow

Judicial officials

- Patience Roggensack, incumbent justice
- Jon Wilcox, former justice of the Wisconsin Supreme Court (1992–2007)

State legislators

- Devin LeMahieu, majority leader of the Wisconsin Senate

Organizations

- Wisconsin Right to Life PAC (co-endorsement with Kelly)
Daniel Kelly

Federal officials

- Glenn Grothman, U.S. representative for Wisconsin's 6th congressional district (2014–present)

Judicial officials

- Rebecca Bradley, Wisconsin Supreme Court justice
- Shelley Grogan, judge of the Wisconsin Court of Appeals

Organizations

- Wisconsin Right to Life PAC (co-endorsement with Dorow)
Everett Mitchell

Judicial officials

- Susan M. Crawford, judge of the Dane County Circuit Court
- Joe Donald, judge of the Wisconsin Court of Appeals
- Paul Higginbotham, former judge of the Wisconsin Court of Appeals (2003–2017)
- Chris Taylor, judge of the Dane County Circuit Court
- Maxine Aldridge White, judge of the Wisconsin Court of Appeals

State officials

- Jim Doyle, former governor of Wisconsin (2003–2011)

Organizations

- Citizen Action (co-endorsement with Protasiewicz)

Labor unions

- Communications Workers of America (co-endorsement with Protasiewicz)
Janet Protasiewicz

Federal officials

- Herb Kohl, former U.S. senator from Wisconsin (1989–2013)

Judicial officials

- Ann Walsh Bradley, Wisconsin Supreme Court justice
- Rebecca Dallet, Wisconsin Supreme Court justice

Organizations

- Citizen Action (co-endorsement with Mitchell)
- EMILY's List

Labor unions

- AFSCME
- American Federation of Teachers
- Brotherhood of Carpenters
- Brotherhood of Electrical Workers
- Communications Workers of America (co-endorsement with Mitchell)
- Laborers' Union
- United Auto Workers

=== Forums ===
2023 Wisconsin Supreme Court candidate forums
No.	Date	Host	Moderator	Link	Candidates			
Key: P Participant A Absent N Not invited I Invited W Withdrawn								
Key: P Participant A Absent N Not invited I Invited W Withdrawn					Jennifer Dorow	Daniel Kelly	Everett Mitchell	Janet Protasiewicz
1	January 9, 2023	State Bar of Wisconsin; Wisconsin Institute for Law and Liberty	JR Ross; Emilee Fannon		P	P	P	P

Results by county: Protasiewicz: Protasiewicz—30–40%; Protasiewicz—40–50%; Protasiewicz—50–60%; Protasiewicz—60–70%; Kelly: Kelly—30–40%; Kelly—40–50%; Kelly—50–60%; Dorow: Dorow—40–50%

=== Primary results ===
Observers saw the February 21 primary as a contest between Kelly and Dorow, as Protasiewicz was widely expected to win a plurality. Kelly won second place over Dorow through his commanding victories in Wisconsin's rural areas. Dorow was strongest in the vote-rich Milwaukee suburbs, but found little support outside of southeast Wisconsin. The two more liberal candidates won a combined 54% of the vote, while the two more conservative candidates won a combined 46% of the vote.

2023 Wisconsin Supreme Court primary election
Party	Candidate	Votes	%
Nonpartisan	Janet Protasiewicz	446,403	46.42%
Nonpartisan	Daniel Kelly	232,751	24.20%
Nonpartisan	Jennifer Dorow	210,100	21.85%
Nonpartisan	Everett Mitchell	71,895	7.48%
Write-in		516	0.05%
Total votes		961,665	100.0%

== General election ==
=== Advertising ===
Campaign spending was greater than any judiciary race in United States history, with outside political action committees accounting for more than two thirds of total expenditures. The Protasiewicz campaign raised $12 million and received $11.3 million in outside spending; her opponent raised $2.2 million and received $15.4 million in outside spending. Early and large donations to Protasiewicz via the Democratic Party enabled her campaign to start airing ads weeks before Kelly. Her opponent received the bulk of his support through dark money PACs, including $5.3 million in spending by PACs controlled by conservative billionaires Richard and Elizabeth Uihlein, and $5.2 million in spending by PACs controlled by the business lobby Wisconsin Manufacturers & Commerce.

Two days after the primary election, Janet Protasiewicz spent at least $135,000 on two new ads. The first continued her previous criticism of Daniel Kelly for representing child predators as a defense attorney, while the second claims he would uphold Wisconsin's abortion ban if elected to the Supreme Court. A Better Wisconsin Together simultaneously booked an additional $500,000 worth of ads in support of Protasiewicz. Protasiewicz's ad spending quickly swelled; by February 27, it had reached $5.4 million. A Better Wisconsin later increased their ad budget to $1.3 million, with one ad hitting Kelly for a past comment he made comparing social security to slavery.

On February 27, Fair Courts America booked close to $1 million worth of ads labeling Protasiewicz as soft on crime. Fair Courts America booked another $550,000 worth of ads on March 6. Meanwhile, the conservative group Wisconsin Manufacturers & Commerce spent $3.2 million in its opening buy, running ads accusing Protasiewicz of issuing low sentences in sexual assault cases. On March 6, Protasiewicz spent an additional $460,000 on ads. One of her ads claimed that Kelly had taken a bribe to un-recuse himself from a case, an accusation that Kelly denied. Another ad accused him of participating in plans to appoint fake electors in 2020 due to Donald Trump's false claims of fraud in the presidential election.

As of March 7, liberal groups had spent nearly twice as much as conservative groups in the general election. Protasiewicz had spent over $7 million, buoyed by an additional $1.7 million from A Better Wisconsin Together; Kelly had not aired any ads himself, instead relying on $3.2 million from Wisconsin Manufacturers & Commerce and $1.7 million from Fair Courts America. By March 15, Protasiewicz had spent $9.1 million and A Better Wisconsin Together had spent $2 million while Kelly still had yet to purchase any ads, though Wisconsin Manufacturers & Commerce had spent $3.4 million and Fair Courts America had spent $2.3 million. There were three times as many Protasiewicz ads on TV compared to Kelly ads, as ad rates are significantly cheaper for candidates than they are for PACs.

In mid-March, Kelly made a $150,000 ad buy, his first of the entire campaign, while Everytown for Gun Safety made a $425,000 purchase in support of Protasiewicz on March 20.

=== Post-primary endorsements ===
Daniel Kelly

Federal officials

- Glenn Grothman, U.S. representative for Wisconsin's 6th congressional district (2015–present)
- Ron Johnson, U.S. senator from Wisconsin (2011–present)

State executive officials

- Scott Walker, 45th governor of Wisconsin (2011–2019)

State judicial officials

- Jennifer Dorow, Waukesha County circuit court judge and 3rd-place finisher in the primary election
- Greg Gill, Wisconsin Court of Appeals District III
- Mark Gundrum, Wisconsin Court of Appeals District II
- Thomas Hruz, Wisconsin Court of Appeals District III
- Maria S. Lazar, Wisconsin Court of Appeals District II
- Pat Roggensack, Wisconsin Supreme Court justice
- Annette Ziegler, chief justice of the Wisconsin Supreme Court

Organizations

- Milwaukee Police Association
- NRA Political Victory Fund
- Wisconsin Farm Bureau
- Wisconsin Fraternal Order of Police
- Wisconsin Republican Party
Janet Protasiewicz

U.S. executive branch officials

- Hillary Clinton, former U.S. secretary of state, former U.S. senator from New York, and former First Lady of the United States
- Eric Holder, former United States attorney general

Federal officials

- Tammy Baldwin, U.S. senator from Wisconsin (2013–present)
- Herb Kohl, former U.S. senator from Wisconsin (1989–2013)
- Gwen Moore, U.S. representative from Wisconsin's 4th congressional district (2005–present)
- Mark Pocan, U.S. representative from Wisconsin's 2nd congressional district (2013–present)

State officials

- Ellen R. Brostrom, Wisconsin circuit court judge and daughter of the outgoing justice Patience Roggensack
- Louis Butler, former Wisconsin Supreme Court justice (2004–2008)
- Jill Karofsky, Wisconsin Supreme Court justice

Organizations

- End Citizens United
- Human Rights Campaign
- Jewish Democratic Council of America
- NARAL Pro-Choice America
- National Committee to Preserve Social Security and Medicare
- People for the American Way
- Planned Parenthood Wisconsin
- Wisconsin Democratic Party

Labor unions

- Wisconsin Building Trades Council

Newspapers

- Wisconsin State Journal

=== Debate ===
2023 Wisconsin Supreme Court candidate debates
No.	Date	Host	Moderator	Link	Candidates	
Key: P Participant A Absent N Not invited I Invited W Withdrawn						
Key: P Participant A Absent N Not invited I Invited W Withdrawn					Daniel Kelly	Janet Protasiewicz
1	March 21, 2023	State Bar of Wisconsin; WISC-TV; WisPolitics.com	JR Ross; Susan Siman; Emilee Fannon; Will Kenneally		P	P

=== Results ===
2023 Wisconsin Supreme Court general election
Party	Candidate	Votes	%	±%
Nonpartisan	Janet Protasiewicz	1,021,822	55.43%	N/A
Nonpartisan	Daniel Kelly	818,391	44.39%	−0.31pp
Write-in		3,267	0.18%	+0.11pp
Total votes		1,843,480	100.0%	+18.96pp
Majority		203,431	11.04%	+0.55pp

==== By congressional district ====
Protasiewicz won four of eight congressional districts, including two that were represented by Republicans.

District	Kelly	Protasiewicz	Representative
1st	47%	53%	Bryan Steil
2nd	22%	78%	Mark Pocan
3rd	45%	55%	Derrick Van Orden
4th	21%	79%	Gwen Moore
5th	59%	41%	Scott L. Fitzgerald
6th	53%	47%	Glenn Grothman
7th	55%	45%	Tom Tiffany
8th	52%	48%	Mike Gallagher

== Aftermath ==
=== Analysis ===
The result, percentage-wise, repeated much of Kelly's performance in his unsuccessful 2020 bid for the Court. Protasiewicz won by 11 percentage points. Protasiewicz became the first Democratic-endorsed candidate to win the city of Waukesha in several election cycles, with Kelly underperforming his 2020 performance in Waukesha County, a historic GOP suburban stronghold. The Democratic Party of Wisconsin and other liberal groups invested heavily in organizing voters in Dane County as well as the WOW counties (Waukesha, Ozaukee, and Washington). In Ozaukee, Kelly won by five percentage points, compared to Mitt Romney's 30-point win of the county in his 2012 campaign for president.

Statewide turnout in the second round, despite being higher than usual for a spring election in an odd-numbered year, was lower than in the 2016 second round. Turnout relative to the state was highest in Dane County and in the WOW counties, while it was lowest in Milwaukee and in the rural, northern areas of the state.

Analysts believed that Protasiewicz's victory challenged long-held traditions among judicial candidates. Instead of presenting herself as nonpartisan, Protasiewicz made her support for abortion rights and her opposition to gerrymandering a centerpiece of her campaign, even calling the Republican-drawn state legislative maps "rigged" and "unfair." In contrast, Kelly gave fewer specifics about his political positions during the campaign, but had a record of anti-abortion and anti-LGBTQ statements, in addition to working for the Wisconsin Republican Party in 2020 as a part of the attempt to overturn the presidential election. Kelly had heavily criticized Protasiewicz during the campaign for running on political issues, calling her a "politician in a black robe". Protasiewicz argued that judicial candidates should be open about their political beliefs, saying that "rather than reading between the lines and having to do your sleuthing around...I would rather just let people know what my values are."

=== Impact ===
Protasiewicz won a decisive victory, flipping the ideological balance of the court to an outright liberal majority for the first time in state history. The court was expected to rule on abortion rights and gerrymandering in Wisconsin. Kelly acknowledged his defeat, but he refused to concede to Protasiewicz by name, stating that he had an "unworthy" opponent.

The election was also seen as a culmination of a series of partisan involvements in Wisconsin Supreme Court elections going back to Michael Gableman's 2008 defeat of incumbent justice Louis B. Butler, which was the first defeat of an incumbent justice since 1967. Gableman's win, which flipped the balance to the right, began a series of conservative wins for the court in 2011, 2013, 2016, 2017, and 2019, which defended many of the policies of Governor Scott Walker's Republican trifecta (including 2011 Wisconsin Act 10) and later served as a foil for the policies of Tony Evers. The string of conservative victories was interrupted by the 2018 election of liberal candidate Rebecca Dallet and again by the 2020 election of liberal candidate Jill Karofsky, who defeated then-incumbent conservative justice Kelly and narrowed the conservative majority to one seat.

Protasiewicz joined the court on August 1, 2023. The new liberal-majority court was expected to address the state's abortion ban quickly. A lawsuit against the ban filed by Democratic Wisconsin Attorney General Josh Kaul was heard in a Dane County circuit court in May 2023 and was expected to be appealed to the state supreme court later in the year. Additionally, Law Forward president Jeffrey Mandell pledged to file a lawsuit against the state's legislative and congressional maps the day after Protasiewicz was seated. Mandell followed through on his promise, filing a lawsuit on August 2 that challenged Wisconsin's maps. Protasiewicz sided with the other three liberals on the court in a December 2023 decision striking down the legislative district maps on technical grounds. New maps were adopted for the 2024 election.

== See also ==
- 2023 Wisconsin elections
