= Brian Hagedorn =

American judge (born 1978)

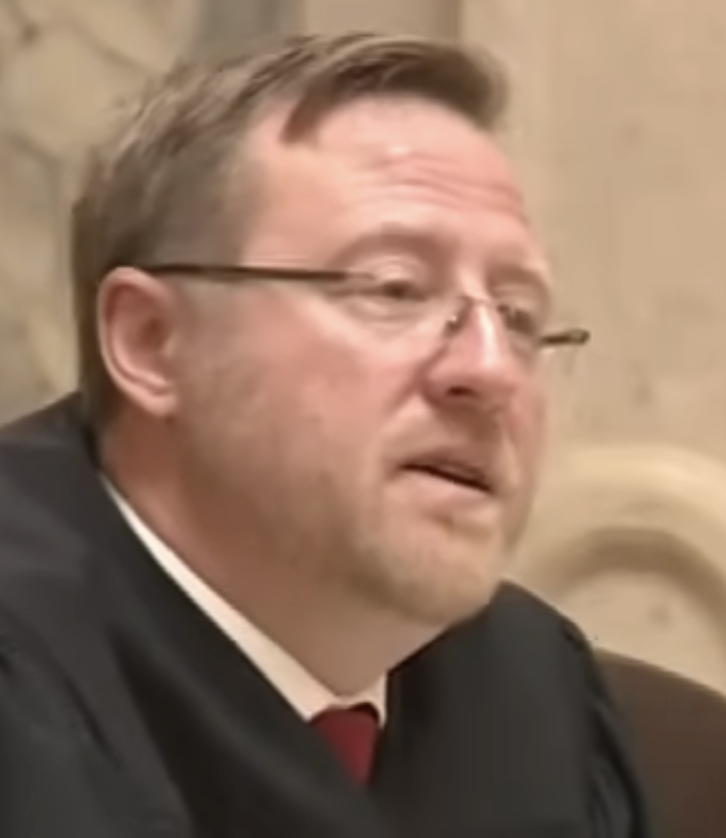
- Hagedorn in 2023

Justice of the Wisconsin Supreme Court
- Incumbent
- Assumed office August 1, 2019
- Preceded by: Shirley Abrahamson

Judge of the Wisconsin Court of Appeals District II
- In office August 1, 2015 – July 31, 2019
- Appointed by: Scott Walker
- Preceded by: Richard S. Brown
- Succeeded by: Jeffrey O. Davis

Personal details
- Born: January 21, 1978 (age 48) Brookfield, Wisconsin, U.S.
- Party: Republican
- Spouse: Christina (divorced 2023)
- Children: 5
- Education: Trinity International University (BA); Northwestern University (JD)

Brian Keith Hagedorn (born January 21, 1978) is an American lawyer and a justice of the Wisconsin Supreme Court, serving since 2019. Before his election to the Supreme Court, he served four years as a judge on the Wisconsin Court of Appeals.

== Early life and education ==
A Milwaukee native, Hagedorn graduated from Trinity International University in 2000 and was employed by Hewitt Associates before receiving his J.D. degree from Northwestern University in 2006. At Northwestern, Hagedorn was president of the school's Federalist Society chapter.

== Career ==
=== Early years ===
Hagedorn was an attorney at the Milwaukee firm Foley & Lardner until 2009 when he was appointed as a law clerk to Wisconsin Supreme Court Justice Michael Gableman. In 2010, Hagedorn was employed as an assistant attorney general in the Wisconsin Department of Justice, under Attorney General J. B. Van Hollen.

In December 2010, Hagedorn was appointed chief legal counsel to the Republican governor-elect Scott Walker. He remained in that office through July 2015. As chief legal counsel, Hagedorn was a drafter of Walker's controversial Wisconsin Budget Repair Bill of 2011, and, in 2014, he served as appointing authority for the defense counsel hired to represent state prosecutors sued by targets of a John Doe probe into Walker's staff.

=== Wisconsin Court of Appeals ===
On July 30, 2015, Walker appointed Hagedorn to the Wisconsin Court of Appeals to be chambered in the Waukesha-based District II. Hagedorn took office on August 1 2015, and replaced retiring Chief Judge Richard S. Brown, who had served on the Court of Appeals since it was created in 1978.

=== Wisconsin Supreme Court ===
In 2019, Hagedorn ran for a seat on the Wisconsin Supreme Court to succeed retiring Justice Shirley Abrahamson, who had served on the court since 1976. His opponent in the election was Lisa Neubauer, Chief Judge of the Wisconsin Court of Appeals.

Based on unofficial results in the nonpartisan general election, Hagedorn originally led by 5,962 votes out of 1.2 million cast, a margin of about 0.5%, with a post-election canvas increasing his lead slightly to around 6,100 votes. Under state law, Neubauer could have requested a recount, but she would have had to fund the recount herself because the difference was greater than 0.25%, which is the margin that triggers a taxpayer-funded recount. Instead, Neubauer conceded to Hagedorn.

Hagedorn was inaugurated on August 1, 2019. After several of his early decisions went contrary to the conservative majority of the court, the Associated Press theorized that Hagedorn could become a swing vote on the Court after the inauguration of liberal justice Jill Karofsky in August 2020. That analysis was borne out throughout 2020, as Hagedorn's vote was decisive on politically sensitive cases on the COVID-19 pandemic in Wisconsin and election-related cases before and after the 2020 election. He has since come under criticism from his former Supreme Court colleague, conservative justice Daniel Kelly, who accused Hagedorn of trying to seek political neutrality when considering the implications of his rulings. Hagedorn remained considered the swing vote until the court shifted from a conservative majority to a liberal majority after the 2023 Wisconsin Supreme Court election. Hagedorn has been described as right-leaning justice, less strictly aligned with the court's conservative wing than the court's conservatives.

==== 2019–2020 voter purge case ====
In a case involving attempts by conservative groups to force the state Elections Commission to purge more than 230,000 voters from the active voter rolls, Hagedorn sided with the liberal justices' position that the Court should not review a lower court's opinion which had halted the purge. Hagedorn's decision resulted in a 3–3 tie on the Court, due to Justice Daniel Kelly's recusal, leaving the lower court ruling in place.

==== COVID-19 pandemic ====
In May 2020, Hagedorn dissented from the conservative majority's decision to invalidate Governor Tony Evers' stay-at-home order amid the COVID-19 pandemic in the United States. He wrote of the majority opinion, "We are not here to do freewheeling constitutional theory. We are not here to step in and referee every intractable political stalemate. In striking down most of (the order), this court has strayed from its charge and turned this case into something quite different than the case brought to us." Conservatives, including outgoing justice Daniel Kelly, subsequently expressed disappointment with Hagedorn.

In November 2020, while COVID-19 cases were surging in Wisconsin, he was in the Wisconsin Supreme Court's conservative majority that prevented the City of Racine Public Health Department from ordering school closures. In March 2021, Hagedorn was in the Wisconsin Supreme Court's conservative majority that prevented Governor Tony Evers from extending a face mask mandate intended to halt the spread of the Coronavirus.

==== 2020 Green Party ballot access ====
In the lead-up to the mailing of absentee ballots for the 2020 election, Hagedorn again sided with the three liberal justices in a critical case keeping the Green Party candidates, Howie Hawkins and Angela Nicole Walker, off of the 2020 ballot in Wisconsin. The Green Party had missed several deadlines to file corrections and responses to errors with their nominating papers, leaving the Wisconsin Elections Commission unable to add the Greens to the ballot.

Just days before ballots were due to be sent out, however, the Greens sued for ballot access with the assistance of several Republican lawyers, and the conservative majority on the Wisconsin Supreme Court took up their case, forcing a statewide pause in the printing and mailing of ballots. This appeared to be part of a larger Republican effort—along with their propping up of the Kanye West presidential campaign and the sabotage of the U.S. Postal Service—to dilute the anti-Trump vote and disrupt absentee voting.

Hagedorn's decision to side with the liberal justices allowed the state to avoid the logistical difficulty that would have resulted from having to re-design and re-print more than a million ballots, which would have all but guaranteed that county clerks would have missed the deadline to send the ballots to voters.

==== 2020 election challenges ====
Following the 2020 United States presidential election, the defeated incumbent, President Donald Trump, launched several lawsuits in several states where the official vote tally showed his opponent Joe Biden as the victor. On December 1, 2020, coinciding with the Governor's certification of Wisconsin's election results—showing Biden as the victor by about 20,000 votes—President Trump's legal team petitioned the Wisconsin Supreme Court to intervene on his behalf to throw out hundreds of thousands of those votes.

On December 3, 2020, Justice Hagedorn again sided with the court's liberal minority, voting to reject the petition from President Trump's campaign on the procedural error that, according to Wisconsin law, any election challenges must originate in the Wisconsin Circuit Courts. Justice Hagedorn said of his decision, "We do well as a judicial body to abide by time-tested judicial norms, even—and maybe especially—in high-profile cases."

==== Redistricting cases (2021–2024) ====
In 2021, the Wisconsin Legislature and governor failed to agree on new redistricting maps to account for the 2020 United States census, so the issue fell to the courts, as had happened in 1982, 1992, and 2002. In those previous examples, the Wisconsin Supreme Court had deferred to panels of federal judges, as the federal courts had established tests and procedure for dealing with redistricting cases. The Wisconsin Supreme Court had only drawn legislative maps once in their history, in 1964, and that decision predated many of the federal laws which now govern redistricting.

Wisconsin Republicans were adamant that the state court should keep the case this time, as they believed they had a greater partisan advantage with the 4–3 conservative majority on the Wisconsin Supreme Court. Conservatives on the court, including Hagedorn, obliged the partisan request and assumed original jurisdiction on Johnson v. Wisconsin Elections Commission, taking on a redistricting case for the first time in nearly 60 years.

The conservative majority on the court then devised a novel test for how they would evaluate map proposals, declaring that they would look to make the "least changes" necessary to the existing maps to reflect the population changes in the 2020 census. Choosing this test alone conferred a distinct and obvious partisan advantage to the Republican Party since the existing maps had been intentionally designed in 2011 to give a partisan advantage to Republican candidates. However, after map proposals had been submitted by the Republican legislature and the Democratic governor, it was found that the governor's map proposal more closely adhered to the court's "least changes" guidance. Hagedorn broke from the conservative majority and sided with the court's three liberals to select Governor Tony Evers maps in March 2022, but that decision was immediately challenged by the United States Supreme Court. The U.S. Supreme Court, in a shadow docket opinion, reversed the Wisconsin Supreme Court on their legislative maps, finding that the state supreme court had adopted a defective process in their redistricting efforts. A short time later, Hagedorn rejoined the conservative majority on the Wisconsin Supreme Court to select the Republican maps. The 2022 map was even more lopsided to Republican partisan advantage than their 2011 plan, and under the 2022 map, the Republicans achieved a super-majority in the Wisconsin Senate.

In 2023, however, the 2023 Wisconsin Supreme Court election flipped the majority of the Wisconsin Supreme Court from conservative to liberal, and Democratic-aligned interest groups vowed to revisit the question of redistricting. As expected, the new court majority took up a new redistricting case in 2023, examining a technical question about whether the maps violated the State Constitution's requirement that districts be composed of "contiguous territory". In a 4–3 decision along ideological lines, the liberal majority ruled in Clarke v. Wisconsin Elections Commission that the maps did violate the Constitution and would need to be entirely redrawn. Hagedorn dissented, writing that the state court lacked proper tests and procedures to handle redistricting cases; he also lamented that the court would now be tainted by recurring partisan battles over redistricting. His dissent in Clarke represented a significant shift in his opinion from his vote in 2022 to assume jurisdiction over the Johnson redistricting case.

== Views on LGBT rights ==
In the mid-2000s, while Hagedorn was in law school, he argued that the Supreme Court ruling that found that anti-sodomy laws were unconstitutional could lead to legalized bestiality (citing the dissent of Justice Antonin Scalia). In an October 2005 blog post that criticized the Supreme Court's decision in Lawrence v. Texas, he stated that "..render[ing] laws prohibiting bestiality unconstitutional [because] the idea of homosexual behavior is different than bestiality as a constitutional matter is unjustifiable". He also argued that gay pride month created "a hostile work environment for Christians."

Hagedorn was paid more than $3,000 to give speeches between 2015 and 2017 to Alliance Defending Freedom. In 2004, as a law student, Hagedorn was an intern for the group, then known as the Alliance Defense Fund.

In 2016, Hagedorn founded the Augustine Academy in Merton, Wisconsin, a private K-6 Christian school. The school's code of conduct bars teachers, parents and students from "participating in immoral sexual activity", which is defined as any form of touching or nudity to evoke sexual arousal apart from the context of marriage between one man and one woman. Teachers who violate the policy can be dismissed and students can be expelled for their or their parents' actions. The school's "Statement of Faith" states that "Adam and Eve were made to complement each other in a one-flesh union that establishes the only normative pattern of sexual relations for men and women," and "..., men and women are not simply interchangeable, nor is gender subject to one's personal preferences." In February 2019, following newspaper reports about these policies, the Wisconsin Realtors Association withdrew its support for Hagedorn and asked him to return an $18,000 donation made to him in January 2019 towards his campaign for the Wisconsin Supreme Court.

== Electoral history ==
=== Wisconsin Court of Appeals (2017) ===
Wisconsin Court of Appeals, District II Election, 2017
Party	Candidate	Votes	%	±%
General Election, April 4, 2017
Nonpartisan	Brian Hagedorn (incumbent)	126,150	99.39%	
	Scattering	773	0.61%	
Total votes		126,923	100.0%	

=== Wisconsin Supreme Court (2019) ===
Wisconsin Supreme Court Election, 2019
Party	Candidate	Votes	%	±%
General Election, April 2, 2019
Nonpartisan	Brian Hagedorn	606,414	50.22%	
Nonpartisan	Lisa Neubauer	600,433	49.72%	
	Scattering	722	0.06%	
Plurality		5,981	0.50%	
Total votes		1,207,569	100.0%	+21.06%

Legal offices
Preceded by Shirley Abrahamson	Justice of the Wisconsin Supreme Court; 2019–present	Incumbent
