= Jennifer Dorow =

American judge (born 1970)

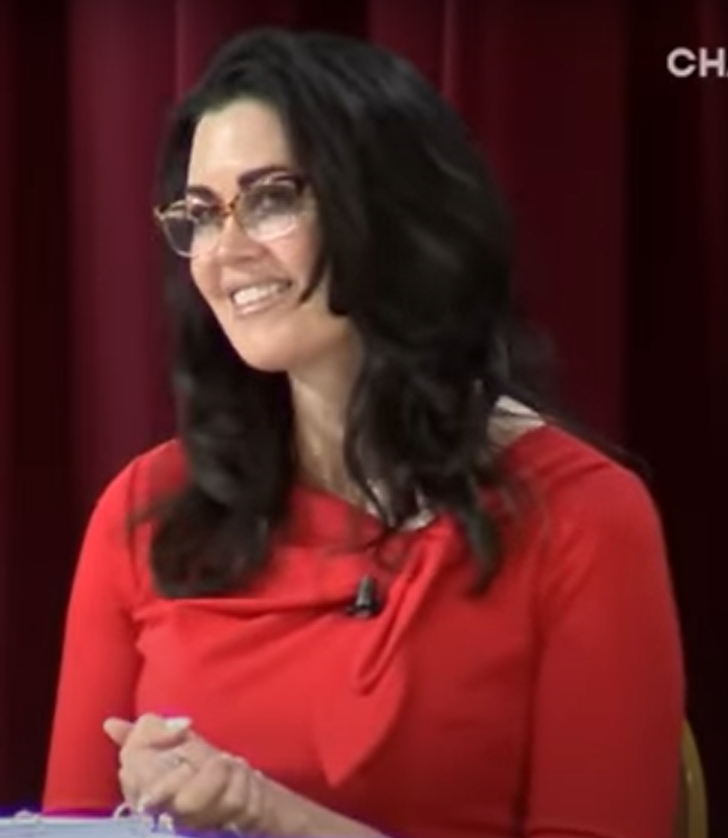
- Dorow in 2023

Chief Judge of the 3rd District of Wisconsin Circuit Courts
- In office August 1, 2017 – July 31, 2023
- Preceded by: Randy R. Koschnick
- Succeeded by: Paul Bugenhagen Jr.

Judge of the Waukesha County Circuit Court Branch 2
- Incumbent
- Assumed office December 1, 2011
- Appointed by: Scott Walker
- Preceded by: Mark Gundrum

Personal details
- Born: Jennifer Rachael Evans; September 1, 1970 (age 56)
- Party: Republican
- Spouse: Brian Dorow (m. 1998)
- Education: Marquette University (BA); Regent University (JD)

Jennifer Rachael Dorow (née Evans; born September 1, 1970) is an American attorney from Wisconsin. She is a Wisconsin circuit court judge in Waukesha County, serving since 2011. She previously served as chief judge of the 3rd district of Wisconsin circuit courts (2017–2023). In 2022, she presided over the trial of Darrell Brooks Jr., the perpetrator of the Waukesha Christmas parade attack, which received national news coverage. Following that trial, Dorow ran for a vacant seat on the Wisconsin Supreme Court, but was eliminated in the primary.

Dorow also presided over the "Eye Drop Murder" case of Jessy Kurczewski, a woman who was charged with first-degree intentional homicide of a childhood friend. The case and trial received national news coverage, as it was aired for the public.

== Personal life ==
Jennifer Rachael Evans was born on September 1, 1970 and attended Waukesha South High School graduating in 1988. During her childhood, Dorow wanted to work as a television news reporter. Dorow received her bachelor’s degree from Marquette University in 1992 and her J.D. from Regent University School of Law in 1996. She has been licensed to practice law in Wisconsin since 1996. Dorow is an active member of the Republican Party in Waukesha County.

Dorow married Brian Dorow, a former dean of criminal justice at Waukesha County Technical College, in 1998. Brian Dorow ran for the Wisconsin State Assembly in 2010, and for the Wisconsin Senate in 2015, but lost both races. During the Trump administration, he was named Assistant Secretary of Homeland Security for State and Local Law Enforcement.

Dorow considers herself a devout Christian.

== Career ==
=== Early career and judicial appointment ===
Dorow began working for the Waukesha District Attorney in 1996. In 2000, she became Waukesha County's assistant district attorney. She left that job in 2004 to become a defense attorney for a private firm run by Matthew Huppertz. In 2010, she became a partner in the firm, now called Huppertz & Dorow.

In 2011, Dorow was appointed a Wisconsin circuit court judge in Waukesha County by Governor Scott Walker, to replace judge Mark Gundrum, who had been elevated to the Court of Appeals. She took office in February 2012. In 2012 and 2018, Dorow ran unopposed for reelection to this office. Dorow was selected as chief judge for the 3rd district of Wisconsin circuit courts by the Wisconsin Supreme Court in 2017, for a two year term, and was retained in that position in 2019 and 2021. The 3rd district comprises Dodge, Jefferson, Ozaukee, Washington, and Waukesha counties.

As a judge, Dorow has claimed to follow a textualist interpretation of the law and constitution. During this time, Dorow served on the Legislative Council Study Committee on Bail & Conditions of Pretrial Release. In 2021, Dorow presided over a carjacking and sexual assault case that occurred at the Waukesha Public Library. That same year, she presided over a case involving a juror who walked out of a case due to concerns regarding COVID-19 precautions. Both of these cases received substantial local coverage.

=== Waukesha Christmas parade attack ===
In February 2022, Judge Dorow was selected as the presiding judge for the Waukesha Christmas Parade attack case after a vehicular attack that left six dead and dozens injured. This was the first case Dorow had presided over to receive national media attention. During the trial, the defendant, Darrell Brooks, made repeated attempts to disrupt the trial and present pseudolegal arguments based on sovereign citizen ideology. Brooks' behavior resulted in Judge Dorow repeatedly removing the former for failure to comply with rules of decorum. Brooks was ultimately found guilty of all 76 charges and sentenced to life without parole by Judge Dorow.

Dorow was widely praised for her skill in presiding over the trial and her conduct in the proceedings. This resulted in the court receiving a substantial amount of fan-mail from individuals from various countries and Judge Dorow being likened to a figure of female empowerment. Others have criticized her approach, believing that she was too lenient on Brooks' misbehavior.

=== Wisconsin Supreme Court candidacy ===
On November 30, 2022, following the Waukesha Christmas Parade attack trial, Judge Dorow announced her candidacy for the Wisconsin Supreme Court. The election was for the replacement of Chief Justice Patience D. Roggensack, who announced her retirement earlier in the year. In her candidacy announcement, Dorow cited the fan mail she had received, claiming that a large number of voters had asked her to run for office and claimed to be a "judicial conservative".

A month before the nonpartisan primary, Dorow was hit with allegations that her 19-year-old son was an active drug dealer in Milwaukee, and that she had been aware of his activities. The information was revealed after the fentanyl overdose death of a University of Wisconsin–Milwaukee student, Cade Reddington, who had been a customer of Dorow's son.

Daniel Kelly and Janet Protasiewicz advanced to the general election, with Dorow coming in third place.

== Political positions ==
=== Cash bail ===
During her time on the Legislative Council Study Committee on Bail and Conditions of Pretrial Release, Dorow was highly critical of cash bail and called for its elimination. On January 29, 2019, she said:

"We don't have a workable preventative detention, and more importantly, cash bail is not a best practice any more.... And so if we are going to change anything, we should be looking at a system that eliminates cash bail with a robust preventative detention coupled with statewide pre-trial services because uniformity and funding need to be part of this solution as well."

This comment, amongst others, drew criticism from conservative talk show host Mark Belling who accused Dorow of "consistently defend[ing] the lenient bail decisions made by court commissioners". In 2022, Dorow was still critical of cash bail, but when asked about eliminating cash bail, she instead supported proposed constitutional amendments that would give judges greater discretion in setting bail.

=== Lawrence v. Texas ===
Dorow has previously been critical of the Lawrence v. Texas ruling, believing that the Supreme Court ruling overstepped the powers given by the United States Constitution. In her 2011 application to become a judge, Dorow referred to the ruling as "a prime example of judicial activism at its worst" and that "[Lawrence v. Texas] went well beyond the four corners of the U.S. Constitution to declare a new constitutional right".

== Electoral history ==
=== Wisconsin Circuit Court (2012–present) ===
Wisconsin Circuit Court, Waukesha Circuit, Branch 2 Election, 2012
Party	Candidate	Votes	%	±%
General Election, April 3, 2012
Nonpartisan	Jennifer Dorow (incumbent)	58,642	99.69%	
	Scattering	182	0.31%	
Total votes		58,824	100.0%	

Wisconsin Circuit Court, Waukesha Circuit, Branch 2 Election, 2018
Party	Candidate	Votes	%	±%
General Election, April 3, 2018
Nonpartisan	Jennifer Dorow (incumbent)	55,483	98.97%	
	Scattering	575	1.03%	
Total votes		56,058	100.0%	

Wisconsin Circuit Court, Waukesha Circuit, Branch 2 Election, 2024
Party	Candidate	Votes	%	±%
General Election, April 2, 2024
Nonpartisan	Jennifer Dorow (incumbent)	79,029	98.82%	
	Scattering	939	1.18%	
Total votes		79,968	100.0%	

=== Wisconsin Supreme Court (2023) ===
Wisconsin Supreme Court Election, 2023
Party	Candidate	Votes	%	±%
Primary Election, February 21, 2023
Nonpartisan	Janet Protasiewicz	446,403	46.42%	
Nonpartisan	Daniel Kelly	232,751	24.20%	
Nonpartisan	Jennifer Dorow	210,100	21.85%	
Nonpartisan	Everett Mitchell	71,895	7.48%	
	Scattering	516	0.05%	
Total votes		961,665	100.0%	

Legal offices
Preceded by Mark Gundrum	Wisconsin Circuit Court Judge for the Waukesha Circuit, Branch 2 December 1, 2011 – present	Incumbent
Preceded by Randy R. Koschnick	Chief Judge of the 3rd District of Wisconsin Circuit Courts; August 1, 2017 – July 31, 2023	Succeeded by Paul Bugenhagen Jr.
