= 2020 Wisconsin Democratic presidential primary =

- April 7, 2020

97 delegates (84 pledged, 13 unpledged) to the Democratic National Convention

Candidate	Joe Biden	Bernie Sanders
Home state	Delaware	Vermont
Delegate count	56	28
Popular vote	581,463	293,441
Percentage	62.86%	31.72%
County results
Biden
50–60%
60–70%
70–80%

Pledged national convention delegates
Type	Del.
CD1	6
CD2	11
CD3	6
CD4	9
CD5	6
CD6	6
CD7	5
CD8	6
PLEO	10
At-large	19
Total pledged delegates	84

The 2020 Wisconsin Democratic presidential primary took place on April 7, 2020, in the midst of the global COVID-19 pandemic, along with the Wisconsin Supreme Court Justice election, as part of the Democratic Party primaries for the 2020 presidential election. The Wisconsin primary was an open primary, with the state awarding 97 delegates to the 2020 Democratic National Convention, of which 84 were pledged delegates allocated on the basis of the results of the primary. Although all forms of voting had to take place on or until April 7, full results were not allowed to be released before April 13, in accordance with a district court ruling.

As of the primary on April 7, former vice president Joe Biden and senator Bernie Sanders were the only candidates left in the race. Even though results were only released six days later, Sanders dropped out and suspended his campaign the next morning (after he had already heavily scaled it back and focused on the treatment of the pandemic crisis), leaving Biden as the party's presumed presidential nominee. Nevertheless, Sanders declared that he wanted to continue competing for delegates at the national convention in subsequent primaries. Biden had ultimately won the primary with around 63% of the vote and 56 delegates, while Sanders, who had previously won Wisconsin in the 2016 primaries, only received around 32% of the vote and 28 delegates.

== Procedure ==
Wisconsin was the only state that voted on April 7, 2020, in the Democratic primaries. The primary followed seven original primary dates between March 17 and April 4 which had been cancelled and postponed due to the COVID-19 pandemic. Voting took place throughout the state from 7:00 a.m. until 8:00 p.m. In the open primary, candidates had to meet a threshold of 15% at the congressional district or statewide level in order to be considered viable. The 84 pledged delegates to the 2020 Democratic National Convention were allocated proportionally on the basis of the results of the primary. Of these, between 5 and 11 were allocated to each of the state's 8 congressional districts and another 10 were allocated to party leaders and elected officials (PLEO delegates), in addition to 19 at-large delegates. Originally planned with 77 delegates, the final number included a 10% bonus of 7 additional delegates on the 55 district and 19 at-large delegates by the Democratic National Committee due to the April date, which belonged to Stage II on the primary timetable.

On April 26, 2020, county caucuses selected delegates for congressional district caucuses, which took place on May 17, 2020, designating national convention district-level delegates. The administrative committee meeting was subsequently held on the day of the state convention on June 12, 2020, to vote on the 19 at-large and 10 pledged PLEO delegates for the Democratic National Convention. The delegation also included 13 unpledged PLEO delegates: 8 members of the Democratic National Committee, 4 members of Congress (one senator and 3 representatives), and the governor Tony Evers.

=== COVID-19 pandemic ===
Since the outbreak of the COVID-19 pandemic, several states had delayed their scheduled primaries and extended the vote-by-mail period. Concerns were raised by health officials, poll workers, and voters that in-person voting at the height of the pandemic would be unsafe for vulnerable individuals. Democratic Governor Tony Evers initially signed an executive order for all-mail-in election, but the order was rejected by the Republican-controlled Wisconsin Legislature.

On April 2, although U.S. District Judge William M. Conley refused to postpone the election, he extended the deadline for absentee voting to April 13 (ordering clerks not to release any election data before that date). However, on April 6, the Supreme Court of the United States overturned Conley's decision, meaning that all absentee ballots still had to be postmarked by "election day, Tuesday, April 7" even though it was still acceptable for the ballots to be received by the clerks as late as April 13. The Supreme Court of the United States "did not alter the provision in Conley's amended order which prohibits the reporting of results until April 13".

Governor Evers then called a special session of the legislature to postpone in-person voting, but the session ended within minutes without action, forcing the primary to go on as planned. Despite having previously expressed the view that he would violate the law by doing so, on April 6, Evers issued an executive order which, if enforced, would have postponed the April 7 elections until the tentative date of June 9. Republican leaders immediately announced that they would challenge the order in the Wisconsin Supreme Court. The Wisconsin Supreme Court ruled that Evers did not have the authority to postpone the elections, thus meaning that Evers' executive order was nullified, and that the elections would be held as scheduled on April 7. This was appealed to a federal court who sided with the governor, and that was appealed to the US Supreme Court, which on a 5–4 vote, upheld the state court's ruling.

Voting was somewhat chaotic, with people waiting in the rain for hours in some cases in masks and social distancing. However, by the time the election concluded, Milwaukee Election Commissioner Neil Albrecht stated that despite some of the problems, the in-person voting ran smoothly.

== Candidates ==
The following individuals were on the ballot in Wisconsin:

Running

- Joe Biden
- Bernie Sanders

Withdrawn

- Michael Bennet
- Michael Bloomberg
- Pete Buttigieg
- John Delaney
- Tulsi Gabbard
- Amy Klobuchar
- Deval Patrick
- Tom Steyer
- Elizabeth Warren
- Andrew Yang

== Polling ==
Polling aggregation
Source of poll aggregation	Date updated	Dates polled	Joe Biden	Bernie Sanders	Other/ Undecided (Note: Calculated by taking the difference of 100% and all other candidates combined)
270 to Win	April 5, 2020	March 6–29, 2020	55.3%	37.0%	7.7%
RealClear Politics	April 5, 2020	March 6–29, 2020	55.3%	37.0%	7.7%
FiveThirtyEight	April 5, 2020	until March 29, 2020 (Note: FiveThirtyEight aggregates polls with a trendline regression of polls rather than a strict average of recent polls.)	51.6%	36.0%	12.4%
Average			54.1%	36.7%	9.2%

Tabulation of individual polls of the 2020 Wisconsin Democratic Primary
Poll source	Date(s) administered	Sample size (Note: Key: A – all adults RV – registered voters LV – likely voters V – unclear)	Margin of error	Joe Biden	Michael Bloomberg	Cory Booker	Pete Buttigieg	Kamala Harris	Amy Klobuchar	Bernie Sanders	Elizabeth Warren	Andrew Yang	Other	Un- decided
Marquette University Law School	Mar 24–29, 2020	394 (LV)	± 5.9%	62%	–	–	–	–	–	34%	–	–	–	4% (Note: Don't know with 2%; Refused to answer with 2%)
Public Policy Polling	Mar 10–11, 2020	898(LV)	–	55%	–	–	–	–	–	39%	–	–	3% (Note: Gabbard with 3%)	3%
YouGov/Yahoo News	Mar 6–8, 2020	–(RV) (Note: Part of a 1,750 registered voter poll of Michigan, Pennsylvania, and Wisconsin)	± 6.4%	49%	–	–	–	–	–	38%	–	–	–	–
	Mar 1–5, 2020	Buttigieg, Klobuchar, Bloomberg, and Warren withdraw from the race												
Marquette University Law School	Feb 19–23, 2020	490 (LV)	± 5.1%	15%	17%	–	13%	–	11%	29%	9%	–	2% (Note: Gabbard and Steyer with 1%; "Someone else" with 0%)	4%
YouGov/University of Wisconsin-Madison	Feb 11–20, 2020	428 (LV)	–	13%	13%	–	12%	–	9%	30%	12%	–	–	11% (Note: "Not sure/other" with 11%)
	Feb 11, 2020	New Hampshire primary; Yang withdraws from the race after close of polls												
Baldwin Wallace University/Oakland University/Ohio Northern University	Jan 8–20, 2020	464 (RV)	–	21.8%	8.4%	–	7.7%	–	3%	28.4%	14.7%	2.2%	2.5% (Note: Gabbard with 0.8%; Patrick with 0.6%; Bennet and Delaney with 0.4%; Steyer with 0.3%)	10.9%
	Jan 13, 2020	Booker withdraws from the race												
Marquette University Law School	Jan 8–12, 2020	358 (LV)	± 6.3%	23%	6%	1%	15%	–	4%	19%	14%	6%	3% (Note: Gabbard and Steyer with 1%; Patrick and Williamson with 0%; someone else with 1%; Bennet and Delaney not reported)	9%
Fox News	Jan 5–8, 2020	671 (LV)	± 3.5%	23%	7%	3%	9%	–	4%	21%	13%	3%	6% (Note: Gabbard and Steyer with 2%; Williamson with 1%; Bennet, Delaney, and Patrick with 0%; none of the above with 1%)	10%
Marquette University Law School	Dec 3–8, 2019	358 (LV)	± 6.3%	23%	3%	4%	15%	–	3%	19%	16%	3%	3% (Note: Gabbard with 1%; Bennet, Castro, Delaney, Patrick, Steyer and Williamson with 0%; someone else with 1%; would not vote with 1%)	11%
	Dec 3, 2019	Harris withdraws from the race												
	Nov 24, 2019	Bloomberg announces his candidacy												
Marquette University Law School	Nov 13–17, 2019	801 (RV)	–	30%	–	3%	13%	2%	3%	17%	15%	2%	6% (Note: Bullock, Steyer, Williamson, someone else, Would not vote, and Refused with 1%; Bennet, Castro, and Delaney with 0%)	10%
Siena Research/New York Times	Oct 13–26, 2019	292	–	23%	–	1%	5%	1%	0%	20%	25%	2%	2% (Note: Gabbard and O'Rourke with 1%; others with 0%)	19%
Kaiser Family Foundation	Sep 23 – Oct 15, 2019	274 (LV)	–	17%	–	2%	6%	3%	3%	10%	22%	2%	1% (Note: O'Rourke with 1%; Steyer with 0%; Castro with no voters; other with 0%)	35%
Fox News	Sep 29 – Oct 2, 2019	663 (LV)	± 3.5%	28%	–	2%	7%	5%	2%	17%	22%	2%	5% (Note: Bullock, Gabbard and O'Rourke with 1%; Bennet, Delaney, Ryan, Sestak, Steyer, Williamson and Other with <1%; Castro and Messam with 0%; None of the above with 1%)	9%
Marquette University Law School	Aug 25–29, 2019	444 (RV)	± 5.3%	28%	–	1%	6%	3%	1%	20%	17%	2%	5% (Note: "Someone else", Bullock, Gillibrand, O'Rourke, Steyer with 1%; Bennet, Gabbard, Delaney, Castro, Ryan and Williamson with 0%)	13%
Change Research	Aug 9–11, 2019	935 (LV)	± 3.2%	20%	–	1%	9%	5%	2%	24%	29%	2%	5% (Note: Gabbard with 2%; Inslee, O'Rourke, Steyer, and Williamson with 1%; Bennet, Bullock, Castro, Delaney, Gillibrand, Hickenlooper, Messam, and Sestak with 0%)	–
Change Research	Jun 29 – Jul 4, 2019	1261 (LV)	–	18%	–	3%	15%	17%	1%	19%	19%	1%	6% (Note: Gabbard and O'Rourke with 2%; Castro, Delaney, Gillibrand and Inslee with 1%; Bennet, Bullock, Gravel, Hickenlooper, Moulton, Ryan, Swalwell and Williamson with 0%; Messam and Sestak with no voters)	–
Zogby Analytics	May 23–29, 2019	238 (LV)	± 6.4%	28%	–	2%	7%	7%	3%	13%	14%	0%	2% (Note: Castro, Gabbard, Gillibrand, and O'Rourke with 1%; Delaney, Hickenlooper, Inslee, and Yang with 0%)	–
	Apr 25, 2019	Biden announces his candidacy												
Zogby Analytics	Apr 15–18, 2019	485 (LV)	± 4.5%	24%	–	4%	10%	7%	4%	20%	6%	1%	11% (Note: O'Rourke with 5%; Hickenlooper with 2%; Castro, Gillibrand, and Yang with 1%; Delaney, Gabbard, and Inslee with 0%; others with 2%)	14%
	Apr 14, 2019	Buttigieg announces his candidacy												
Emerson College	Mar 15–17, 2019	324 (LV)	± 5.4%	24%	–	2%	1%	5%	4%	39%	14%	1%	10% (Note: O'Rourke with 6%; Gillibrand with 1%; Castro, Gabbard, Hickenlooper, and Inslee with 0%; others with 3%)	–

== Results ==
2020 Wisconsin Democratic presidential primary
Candidate	Votes	%	Delegates
Joe Biden	581,463	62.86	56
Bernie Sanders	293,441	31.72	28
Elizabeth Warren (withdrawn)	14,060	1.52	
Michael Bloomberg (withdrawn)	8,846	0.96	
Amy Klobuchar (withdrawn)	6,079	0.66	
Tulsi Gabbard (withdrawn)	5,565	0.60	
Pete Buttigieg (withdrawn)	4,946	0.53	
Andrew Yang (withdrawn)	3,349	0.36	
Tom Steyer (withdrawn)	836	0.09	
John Delaney (withdrawn)	529	0.06	
Michael Bennet (withdrawn)	475	0.05	
Deval Patrick (withdrawn)	311	0.03	
Write-in votes	1,575	0.17	
Uninstructed Delegate	3,590	0.39	
Total	925,065	100%	84

== See also ==
- Impact of the 2019–20 coronavirus pandemic on politics
- 2020 Wisconsin elections
- 2020 Wisconsin Republican primary
