= WIVA =

WIVA may refer to:

- Wisconsin Virtual Academy, A virtual school based in McFarland, Wisconsin
- WIVA-FM
