= Daniel Kelly (Wisconsin judge) =

American judge

Dan Kelly
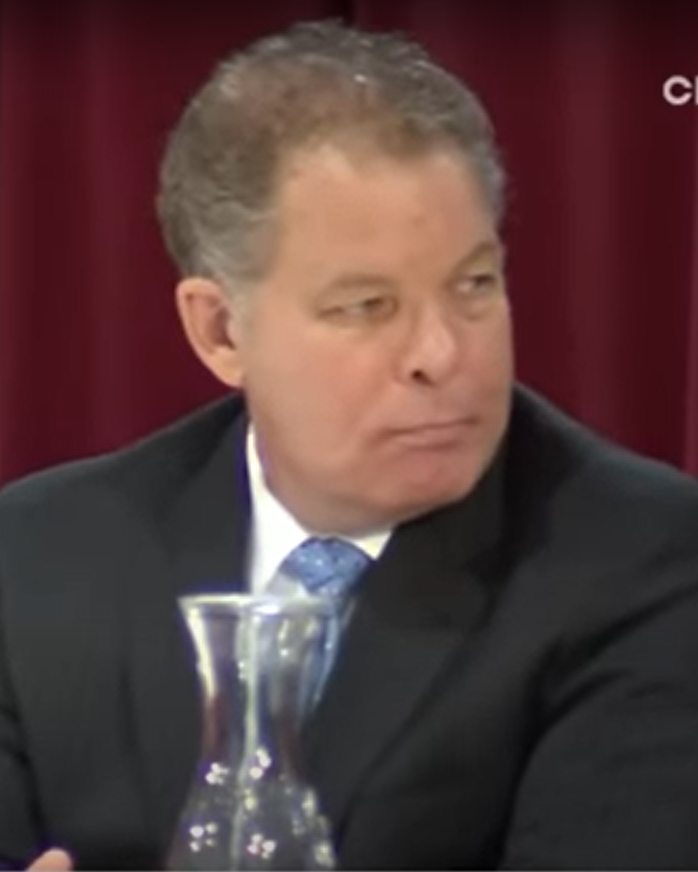
- Kelly in 2023

Justice of the Wisconsin Supreme Court
- In office August 1, 2016 – July 31, 2020
- Appointed by: Scott Walker
- Preceded by: David Prosser Jr.
- Succeeded by: Jill Karofsky

Personal details
- Born: February 25, 1964 (age 62) Santa Barbara, California, U.S.
- Spouse: Elisa Kelly
- Children: 5
- Education: Carroll University (BA); Regent University (JD)
- Website: Campaign website

Daniel Kelly (born February 25, 1964) is an American attorney and former judge from Wisconsin. He served four years as a justice of the Wisconsin Supreme Court, from August 1, 2016, through July 31, 2020; He was appointed by Wisconsin Governor Scott Walker in 2016 to fill the unexpired term of Justice David Prosser Jr., but lost election for a full term in 2020 to circuit judge Jill Karofsky. He ran for an open seat on the Supreme Court again in 2023, but lost to circuit judge Janet Protasiewicz; the 2023 Wisconsin Supreme Court election was the most expensive judicial race in history up to that time.

== Early life and education ==
Born in Santa Barbara, California, Kelly grew up in Arvada, Colorado. He moved to Waukesha, Wisconsin, in 1982 to attend Carroll College, where he graduated in 1986 with degrees in political science and Spanish. He attended the evangelical Christian Regent University School of Law, where he was founding editor-in-chief of the law review, graduating in 1991.

== Legal career ==
After law school, Kelly clerked for Wisconsin Court of Appeals judge Ralph Adam Fine for one year, then for the United States Court of Federal Claims for four years.

From 1998 to 2013, Kelly worked as a litigator at Reinhart Boerner Van Deuren, a law firm headquartered in Milwaukee. While there, he represented a variety of corporate and political clients. In 1999, he represented University of Wisconsin student Scott Southworth in Board of Regents of the University of Wisconsin System v. Southworth, a United States Supreme Court case regarding the constitutionality of mandatory student activity fees to fund activist groups at public universities. Later in his private practice career, he represented Republicans in the Wisconsin Legislature in lawsuits over the 2010 legislative redistricting in Wisconsin.

Kelly left Reinhart in 2013 to serve as vice president and General Counsel for the Kern Family Foundation, a conservative nonprofit in Waukesha County.

In 2014, he left the Kern Family Foundation to co-found a private practice firm, Rogahn Kelly, LLC. He stayed there until his appointment to the Wisconsin Supreme Court.

=== Wisconsin Supreme Court ===
After the announcement of the nearing retirement of Justice David Prosser Jr., in 2016, Kelly was appointed by Governor Scott Walker to serve as a justice of the Wisconsin Supreme Court. Under Wisconsin law, the seat would come up for election on the next spring election when no other Wisconsin Supreme Court seat was up for election. At the time, Walker received criticism for selecting a Justice with no prior judicial experience who held the fringe view that affirmative action was comparable to slavery. Justice Kelly ran for a full term on the court when it came up for election in 2020, but was defeated by current Wisconsin Circuit Court judge Jill Karofsky. Justice Kelly's term in office ended July 31, 2020.

==== Wisconsin Carry v. City of Madison ====
In a 2017 case, Kelly wrote for a 5–2 majority holding that the City of Madison is forbidden under state statute from banning passengers from carrying firearms on city buses.

==== Tetra Tech v. Department of Revenue ====
In a landmark 2018 administrative law case, Kelly wrote the Court's lead opinion, which held that the Court would no longer follow the practice of judicial deference to agencies' interpretations of their own rules in Wisconsin.

==== Alleged conflicts of interest ====
During his time on the Wisconsin Supreme Court, Kelly came under fire for not recusing himself from multiple cases that involved organizations with which he had close ties. As one example, in the days immediately preceding the decision Koschkee v. Taylor, Kelly received $1,000 contributions from board members of the non-profit conservative law firm, Wisconsin Institute for Law and Liberty, that was representing the petitioners in Koschkee v. Taylor. Kelly would ultimately join the majority opinion that ruled in favor of the Petitioners.

Kelly also opposed a petition brought by over 50 retired Wisconsin judges to strengthen standards on when judges should remove themselves from cases because of a conflict of interest.

=== 2020 Wisconsin Supreme Court election ===
On May 28, 2019, Kelly officially announced his intent to run for a full ten-year term on the Wisconsin Supreme Court. He faced two opponents in the race, Marquette University Law School professor Ed Fallone and Dane County Circuit Court judge Jill Karofsky. He came in first in the February primary, but lost the April general election to Karofsky.

=== Post-Supreme Court career ===
After losing the 2020 Wisconsin Supreme Court election, Kelly joined a conservative nonprofit, the Institute for Reforming Government, as a senior fellow in constitutional governance. While there, he was the author of the "Lawmaker's Manual for Executive Oversight," a guide for Wisconsin legislators to use their investigatory committee powers to hold executive branch officials accountable.

Since leaving the Wisconsin Supreme Court, Kelly has been vocal in his criticism of his former colleague, conservative justice Brian Hagedorn, for breaking with the court's conservative majority on several decisions. Kelly accused Hagedorn of considering the political implications of his rulings instead of "following what the law says".

==== Involvement in Stop the Steal movement ====
Kelly was paid $120,000 by the Wisconsin State Republican Party and the Republican National Committee as an attorney who worked on election issues in 2020 after his term with the Wisconsin Supreme Court ended. In the weeks following the 2020 presidential election, he provided legal counsel to the Wisconsin GOP to overturn the 2020 election. Former Wisconsin Republican Party Chairman Andrew Hitt said in a deposition that he and Kelly had "pretty extensive conversations" about the illegal fake elector scheme in Wisconsin that was one of the well-known attempts to overturn the 2020 United States presidential election.

=== 2023 Wisconsin Supreme Court election ===
In September 2022, Kelly announced that he would run for retiring justice Patience D. Roggensack's seat on the Wisconsin Supreme Court. He faced three opponents in the race, conservative Waukesha County Circuit Judge Jennifer Dorow and two liberal candidates, Milwaukee County Circuit Judge Janet Protasiewicz and Dane County Circuit Judge Everett Mitchell. Kelly came in second in the February 2023 primary, advancing to the general election against Protasiewicz, which took place on April 4, 2023.

Leading up to the February primary election, Kelly received financial support from influential political donors Richard and Elizabeth Uihlein, with Fair Courts America, the Super PAC largely bankrolled by the Uihleins, having spent $1.8 million on ads supporting Kelly, and an additional $40,000 of political contributions made to Kelly's campaign by the Uihleins.

Despite having taken no public stance on the constitutionality of Wisconsin's existing 1849 law that bans abortion in all cases except for when abortion is performed to save the life of the mother, Kelly had also been endorsed by Wisconsin Right to Life, Wisconsin Family Action and Pro-Life Wisconsin, three anti-abortion groups.

Ellen Brostrom, Milwaukee County circuit judge and Roggensack's daughter, opined an article in the Milwaukee Journal Sentinel criticizing Kelly's fitness to serve on the court and endorsing Janet Protasiewicz.

Following his loss to Protasiewicz, Kelly refused to call Protasiewicz to formally concede the race. Instead, he called Protasiewicz "not ... a worthy opponent to which I can concede". Kelly added that he believed Protasiewicz was a "serial liar", her campaign was "dishonorable and despicable", and she had "demeaned the judiciary". The day after this speech, local political columnist Daniel Bice opined that there was "no bigger or sorer [election] loser" than Kelly. Bice added that Kelly's legacy in Wisconsin would now focus on his being "the first Republican to put two liberals on the state Supreme Court single-handedly."

== Personal life ==
Kelly is a Christian. Kelly is married to Elisa Kelly, whom he met during their time together as students at Carroll University. They have five children and reside in North Prairie, Wisconsin.

=== Views ===
After President Obama's 2012 re-election win, Kelly said his re-election was a win for the "socialism/same-sex marriage/recreational marijuana/tax increase crowd." Kelly has likened Social Security to slavery. He has argued that U.S. Supreme Court's decision in Obergefell v. Hodges (2015), which ruled that bans on same-sex marriage were unconstitutional, was illegitimate. In 2014, Kelly wrote that slavery and affirmative action both "spring from the same taproot" and that "neither can exist without the foundational principle that it is acceptable to force someone into an unwanted economic relationship." Kelly is also considered staunchly anti-abortion, after a 2012 blog post where he described abortion, at any stage of the pregnancy, to "the taking of human life."

In his application to be Governor Walker's nominee to the Wisconsin Supreme Court in 2016, he wrote that the best U.S. Supreme Court decision of the prior 30 years was United States v. Lopez (1995) and that the worst decision was Kelo v. City of New London (2005). In his 2023 bid for a seat on the Court, he reiterated his view that Kelo was wrongly decided.

== Electoral history ==
=== Wisconsin Supreme Court (2020) ===
Wisconsin Supreme Court Election, 2020
Party	Candidate	Votes	%
Primary Election, February 18, 2020
Nonpartisan	Daniel Kelly (incumbent)	352,876	50.04%
Nonpartisan	Jill J. Karofsky	261,783	37.13%
Nonpartisan	Ed Fallone	89,184	12.65%
N/a	Scattering	1,295	0.18%
Total votes		705,138	100.0%
General Election, April 7, 2020
Nonpartisan	Jill J. Karofsky	855,573	55.21%
Nonpartisan	Daniel Kelly (incumbent)	693,134	44.73%
N/a	Scattering	990	0.06%
Total votes		1,549,075	100.0%

=== Wisconsin Supreme Court (2023) ===
Wisconsin Supreme Court Election, 2023
Party	Candidate	Votes	%	±%
Primary Election, February 21, 2023
Nonpartisan	Janet Protasiewicz	446,403	46.42%	
Nonpartisan	Daniel Kelly	232,751	24.20%	−25.84%
Nonpartisan	Jennifer Dorow	210,100	21.85%	
Nonpartisan	Everett Mitchell	71,895	7.48%	
Write-in		516	0.05%	-0.13%
Total votes		961,665	100.0%	+36.38%
General Election, April 4, 2023
Nonpartisan	Janet Protasiewicz	1,021,822	55.43%	
Nonpartisan	Daniel Kelly	818,391	44.39%	−0.30%
Write-in		3,267	0.18%	+0.11%
Plurality		203,431	11.04%	+0.48%
Total votes		1,843,480	100.0%	+18.93%

Legal offices
Preceded by David Prosser Jr.	Justice of the Wisconsin Supreme Court; 2016–2020	Succeeded by Jill Karofsky
