= Mark Gundrum =

American politician & judge (born 1970)

Judge of the Wisconsin Court of Appeals for the 2nd district
- Incumbent
- Assumed office November 4, 2011
- Appointed by: Scott Walker
- Preceded by: Daniel P. Anderson

Judge of the Waukesha County Circuit Court Branch 2
- In office August 1, 2010 – November 4, 2011
- Preceded by: Richard Congdon
- Succeeded by: Jennifer Dorow

Member of the Wisconsin State Assembly from the 84th district
- In office January 4, 1999 – July 31, 2010
- Preceded by: Mary Lazich
- Succeeded by: Mike Kuglitsch

Personal details
- Born: March 20, 1970 (age 56) Milwaukee, Wisconsin, U.S.
- Party: Republican
- Education: University of Wisconsin, Madison (BA, JD)

Military service
- Allegiance: United States
- Branch/service: United States Army • U.S. Army Reserve
- Years of service: 2000–present
- Unit: Army Judge Advocate General's Corps
- Battles/wars: Iraq War

Mark Gundrum (born March 20, 1970) is an American lawyer and politician serving as a judge of the Wisconsin Court of Appeals for District II. He previously served as a member of the Wisconsin State Assembly from 1999 to 2010.

== Early life and education ==
Born in Milwaukee, Wisconsin, Gundrum graduated from Catholic Memorial High School, where he played for the school's gridiron football team. He received his bachelor's and law degrees from the University of Wisconsin–Madison.

== Career ==
Gundrum served on the Hales Corners, Wisconsin village board. He later worked as a staff attorney for Rudolph T. Randa, a judge for the United States District Court for the Eastern District of Wisconsin. He joined the United States Army Reserve in 2000, and was deployed to Iraq in 2008.

In 1998, Gundrum won the race to succeed Mary Lazich in the Wisconsin State Assembly as a Republican. In the 2002 election, he defeated fellow state legislator Marc C. Duff, who ran against Gundrum due to redistricting. While serving in the Wisconsin State Assembly, Gundrum worked with Steven Avery, who was exonerated after being falsely convicted of a sexual assault, to pass a criminal justice reform bill. In 2010, Gundrum was elected as a Circuit Court judge for Waukesha County. He was soon thereafter appointed by Governor Scott Walker in 2011 to fill a vacancy on the Wisconsin Court of Appeals. Gundrum successfully ran for the seat in 2013 and was re-elected in 2019.

Gundrum was named as one of Governor Scott Walker's finalists to replace Justice David Prosser, Jr. on the Wisconsin Supreme Court in June 2016.

== Personal life ==
Gundrum and his wife, Mary, married in 1996. They are Catholic and have ten children, whom they homeschooled through Wisconsin Virtual Academy. Their youngest child was born with encephalocele and a facial cleft, which required surgery to correct at Boston Children's Hospital. Gundrum appeared in the 2015 Netflix documentary series Making a Murderer, detailing Avery's case.
