= Janet Protasiewicz =

American judge (born 1962)

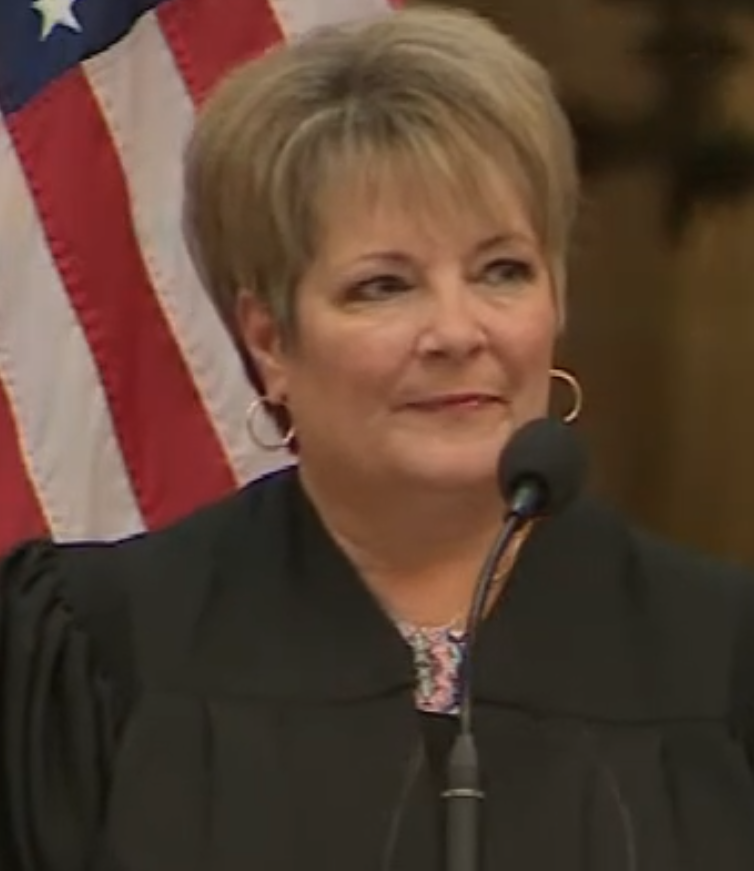
- Protasiewicz in 2023

Justice of the Wisconsin Supreme Court
- Incumbent
- Assumed office August 1, 2023
- Preceded by: Patience D. Roggensack

Judge of the Milwaukee County Circuit Court Branch 24
- In office August 1, 2014 – July 31, 2023
- Preceded by: Charles Kahn
- Succeeded by: Raphael F. Ramos

Personal details
- Born: Janet Claire Protasiewicz; December 3, 1962 (age 63) Milwaukee, Wisconsin, U.S.
- Spouse(s): Patrick Madden (m. 1997; div. 1997) Greg Sell (m. 2006; died 2024)
- Education: University of Wisconsin–Milwaukee (BA); Marquette University (JD)
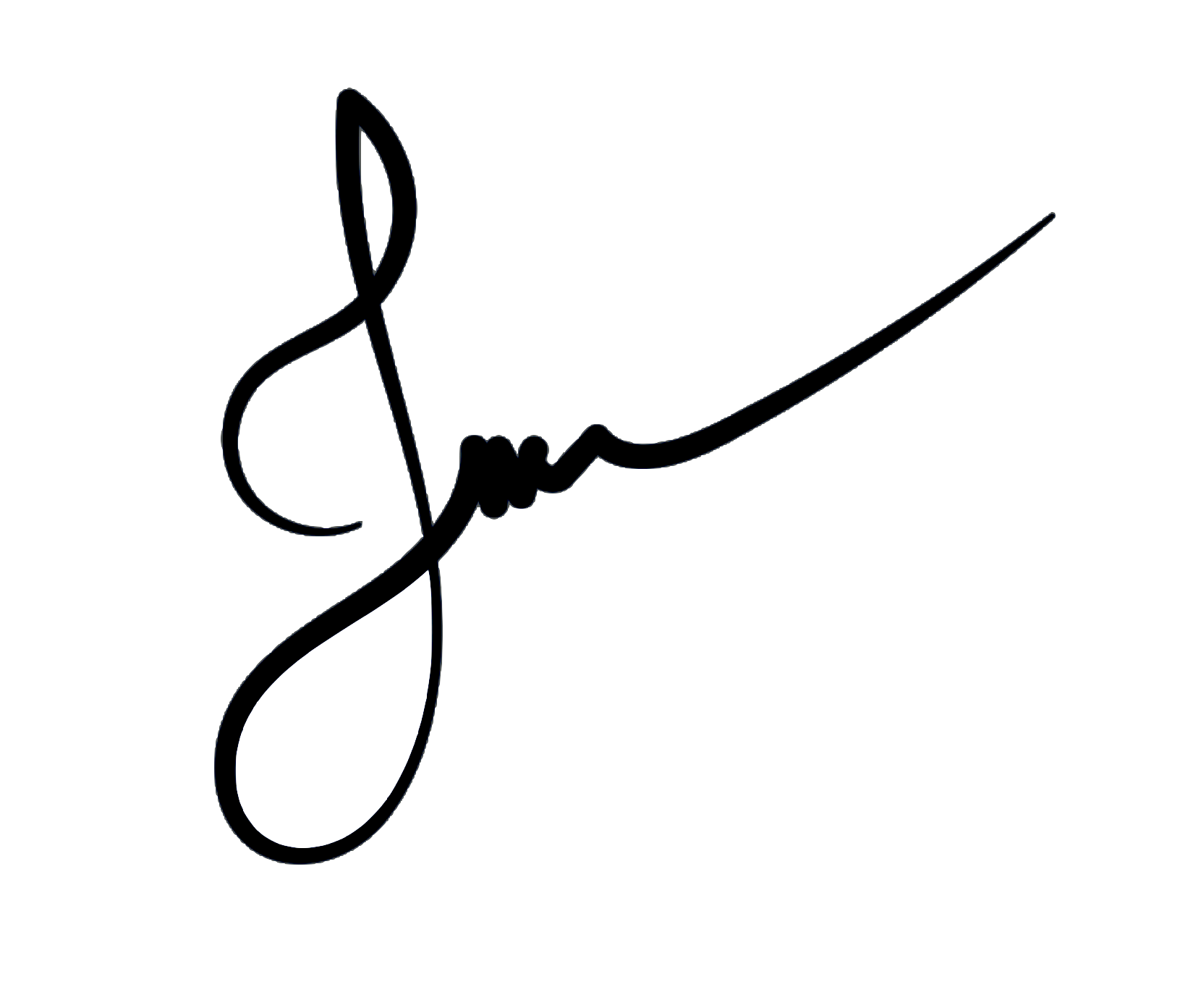
- Signature

Janet Claire Protasiewicz (/ˌproʊtəˈseɪwɪts/; proh-tə-SAY-wits; born December 3, 1962) is an American attorney and jurist from Wisconsin who has served as a justice of the Wisconsin Supreme Court since August 2023. Protasiewicz was elected to the court in the 2023 election, after previously serving as a Milwaukee County circuit court judge in from 2014 to 2023 and as an assistant district attorney in Milwaukee for 26 years.

== Early life and education ==
Protasiewicz was born and raised on the south side of Milwaukee, Wisconsin. She graduated from Pius XI High School in 1981. She earned her bachelor's degree in education from the University of Wisconsin–Milwaukee in 1985 and her Juris Doctor from the Marquette University Law School in 1988.

== Career ==
Shortly after graduation from law school, Protasiewicz joined the office of the Milwaukee County District Attorney. She remained with the office 26 years as an assistant district attorney.

While working in the district attorney's office, she was a member of the employees' union. She participated in several of the protests against 2011 Wisconsin Act 10, the so-called "Budget Repair Bill," which stripped many collective bargaining rights from Wisconsin unions.

In 2013, she made her first run for public office, running for a Milwaukee County circuit judge position against incumbent Rebecca Bradley. Bradley had just been appointed to the position by Republican Governor Scott Walker, but managed to prevail in the election. Protasiewicz received 47% of the vote.

The following year, however, another Milwaukee County judge, Charles Kahn, announced his retirement. Protasiewicz ran for the open seat and won without opposition. She was re-elected without opposition in 2020. As a circuit judge, Protasiewicz was assigned to family court, and had previously presided over felony, domestic violence, and drug court cases.

=== 2023 Wisconsin Supreme Court election ===
In the spring of 2022, Protasiewicz announced her candidacy for Wisconsin Supreme Court in the 2023 election. Ultimately, three other candidates entered the race for the seat being vacated by the retirement of justice Patience Roggensack. Protasiewicz came in first in the February nonpartisan primary, securing a place in the April general election. Her opponent in the general election was former Wisconsin Supreme Court justice Daniel Kelly. Although Wisconsin Supreme Court elections are nonpartisan, Kelly was endorsed by the Republican Party of Wisconsin and Protasiewicz was endorsed by the Democratic Party of Wisconsin.

Protasiewicz was candid during her campaign for Supreme Court about her philosophy and values on issues such as abortion, gerrymandering, LGBTQ rights, and environmental protections. She supports abortion and opposed the state's then Republican-drawn legislative maps.

The 2023 Wisconsin Supreme Court election gained nationwide attention and became the most expensive judicial election in American history by a wide margin. Together, the candidates spent about $42 million, of which Protasiewicz and supportive entities spent $23.3 million. A significant portion of Protasiewicz's funding came via the Wisconsin Democratic Party, whose largest donations of $1 million each came from investor and philanthropist George Soros, Illinois governor J. B. Pritzker, and businesswomen/philanthropists Stacy and Lynn Schusterman. Over the final stretch of the race, Protasiewicz outraised Kelly more than 5 to 1, although that gap grew closer once third-party entities were included.

Protasiewicz won the April 4 general election, defeating Kelly by 11.02 percentage points, receiving 24.8% more votes. News organizations projected her victory within a few hours of polls closing.

=== Wisconsin Supreme Court ===
Protasiewicz was sworn in as a justice of the Wisconsin Supreme Court on August 1, 2023, at the Capitol Rotunda. The ceremony lasted for about an hour, of which a bit over 20 minutes was devoted to a speech from Protasiewicz where she highlighted her biography and upbringing. Fellow justices Ann Walsh Bradley and Rebecca Dallet also spoke at the event.

Media outlets viewed Protasiewicz's accession as an ideological shift for the court, marking the return of liberal control of the court for the first time since 2007.

==== Impeachment threat ====
Within a month of her inauguration, Republicans in the state legislature began threatening to impeach her. This was tied to demands that she should recuse herself from cases challenging Wisconsin's gerrymandered legislative maps. Republicans accused her of having pre-judged the case, because of comments she made during the campaign, and complaining that she had received funding from the Democratic Party of Wisconsin. Those allegations were also brought to the Wisconsin Judicial Commission, a nonpartisan body which reviews complaints against Wisconsin judges. The Judicial Commission dismissed the complaints against Protasiewicz.

Since the removal of Protasiewicz would have just enabled Democratic governor Tony Evers to appoint another Democratic-friendly justice to the court, Republicans discussed further prolonging the impeachment process to keep Protasiewicz in limbo, since a judge could not take part in any cases after being impeached but prior to their trial in the Senate. The impeachment threat gained national attention and state Democrats mobilized to defend Protasiewicz. At the height of the controversy, Republican Assembly speaker Robin Vos announced that he would seek advice from a panel of former justices that would investigate whether impeachment was warranted. It was later revealed that the panel consisted of former justices David Prosser Jr. and Jon P. Wilcox, and former chief justice Patience Roggensack. Prosser made his opinion public in an October 6 letter to Vos, saying, "there should be no effort to impeach Justice Protasiewicz on anything we know now. Impeachment is so serious, severe, and rare that it should not be considered unless the subject has committed a crime, or the subject has committed indisputable 'corrupt conduct' while 'in office.'" Wilcox soon announced that he had a similar opinion.

In late December 2023, Vos confirmed that the Assembly was unlikely to launch an impeachment of Protasiewicz over the redistricting case.

== Personal life ==
Protasiewicz was raised by her mother and stepfather in a Catholic family. Protasiewicz was previously married to Patrick Madden, a Wisconsin circuit judge. At the time, she was an assistant district attorney in her 30s, while he was a Wisconsin circuit judge in his 70s with three adult children. The marriage lasted just a few months and ended contentiously. One of Madden's children later alleged that Protasiewicz abused him, a claim Protasiewicz strongly denied.

She resides in the city of Franklin. Her second husband, attorney Gregory Sell, died of cancer in July 2024.

== Electoral history ==
=== Wisconsin Circuit Court (2013) ===
Wisconsin Circuit Courts, Milwaukee Circuit, Branch 45 Election, 2013
Party	Candidate	Votes	%
General Election, April 2, 2013
Nonpartisan	Rebecca Bradley (incumbent)	55,177	53.00%
Nonpartisan	Janet Protasiewicz	48,685	46.77%
Write-in		237	0.23%
Plurality		6,492	6.24%
Total votes		104,099	100.0%

=== Wisconsin Supreme Court (2023) ===
Wisconsin Supreme Court Election, 2023
Party	Candidate	Votes	%
Primary Election, February 21, 2023
Nonpartisan	Janet Protasiewicz	446,403	46.42%
Nonpartisan	Daniel Kelly	232,751	24.20%
Nonpartisan	Jennifer Dorow	210,100	21.85%
Nonpartisan	Everett Mitchell	71,895	7.48%
Write-in		516	0.05%
Total votes		961,665	100.0%
General Election, April 4, 2023
Nonpartisan	Janet Protasiewicz	1,021,822	55.43%
Nonpartisan	Daniel Kelly	818,391	44.39%
Write-in		3,267	0.18%
Plurality		202,652	11.04%
Total votes		1,843,480	100.0%

Legal offices
Preceded by Patience D. Roggensack	Justice of the Wisconsin Supreme Court; 2023–present	Incumbent
