= Women LEAD =

Non-governmental organization

Women LEAD Nepal
- Formation: 2012; 14 years ago
- Founder: Claire Naylor, Claire Charmanac and Sonu Shakya Bajracharya
- Type: Non-governmental organization
- Location: Lalitpur, Nepal
- Key people: Hima Bista (Executive Director)
- Website: www.women-lead.org

Women LEAD Nepal is a non-governmental organization that provides women's leadership development training and advocacy in Nepal. It is based in Kathmandu, Nepal, and Arlington, Virginia, in the United States.

The group originated as a leadership development organization for young women in Nepal from a 2010 project by Georgetown University students Claire Naylor and Claire Charamnac. Starting from a two-week pilot program serving 28 young women in 2010, as of June 2013 the organization maintains three year-long programs serving 400 youth. Initiatives include a leadership institute, an internship program and an entrepreneurship program, and the group keeps track of its graduates' progress after they take part in the program.

In 2011, the group's founders were awarded a $10,000 grant from Davis Projects For Peace for the project, which they used to officially found Women LEAD after graduating. In the same year, the group was a recipient of the annual "Generation Peace" award from Peace X Peace. In 2012, the group was chosen by Women Deliver for the "Women Deliver 50" list of the "50 most inspiring ideas and solutions worldwide that are delivering for girls and women", in the category of "leadership and empowerment". In 2016, Stars Foundation awarded Women LEAD with With and For Girls Award, alongside Shakti Samuha and Her Turn. Since 2018, Women LEAD has been organizing an OWN IT Nepal, a one-day leadership summit for young women in Kathmandu. The summit, aimed at bridging the gap between Nepali women leaders and the young women who aspire to be like them, was attended by over 250 young people. The third iteration of OWN IT included panel discussions featuring women leaders, such as Mohna Ansari, Manchala Jha, and Bonita Sharma, as well as speed mentoring sessions for the participants.

== See also ==
- Women in Nepal
