= Abortion in Wisconsin =

In use

Abortion in Wisconsin is legal.

From September to late October 2025, Planned Parenthood paused abortions services due to Medicaid funding cuts, but resumed them on October 27, 2025. Its legal status was unclear after the overturning of Roe v. Wade by the U.S. Supreme Court on June 24, 2022. After a court decision on September 18, 2023, the state operated under the assumption that the old law was operative.

An 1849 law banned the procedure in all cases except when the life of the mother is in danger. Abortion opponents often cited this law. In 2023, however, lower-level state courts ruled that it only applied to infanticide and not consensual abortions, and in 2025, the Wisconsin Supreme Court entirely struck down the old law.

In a 2014 poll by the Pew Research Center, 53% of Wisconsin adults said that abortion should be legal in all or most cases, and 45% said it should be illegal in all or most cases.

The 2023 American Values Atlas reported that, in their most recent survey, 66% of Wisconsinites said that abortion should be legal in all or most cases.

The Center for Reproductive Rights has labeled the state as hostile towards abortion rights, citing concerns such as the 20-week ban, telemedicine ban, as well as TRAP, admitting privileges, transfer agreement, reporting, parental consent, mandatory counseling, mandatory ultrasound, and waiting period requirements.

== History ==
=== Legislative history ===
Scott Walker talking in April 2012 during recall efforts. Walker's recall election was set for June 5, and his Equal Pay repeal and other recent legislative actions on abortion and abstinence-only sex education have added fuel to his Democratic opponents' fire. Regardless, he was still polling ahead of both of his main Democratic challengers.

In 1849, the state legislature passed a law that criminalized abortion, making it a felony for a doctor to perform an abortion on a woman regardless of the circumstances of her pregnancy. This included pregnancies resulting from rape or incest, unless the pregnancy endangered the life of the mother:

Every person who shall administer to any woman pregnant with a quick child, any medicine, drug, or substance whatever, or shall use or employ any instrument or other means, with intent thereby to destroy such child, unless the same shall have been necessary to preserve the life of such mother, or shall have been advised by two physicians to be necessary for such purpose, shall, in case the death of such child or of such mother be hereby produced, be deemed guilty of manslaughter in the second degree.

By 1950, the state legislature passed a law stating that a woman who had an abortion or actively sought to have an abortion, regardless of whether she went through with it, was guilty of a criminal offense.

Wisconsin Stat. § 940.15, enacted in 1985, made abortion a crime only after viability, and allowed abortion after viability “if the abortion is necessary to preserve the life or health of the woman, as determined by reasonable medical judgment of the woman's attending physician.”

In 2007, the state was one of 23 states to have a detailed abortion-specific informed consent requirement. Georgia and Wisconsin were 2 of the only 22 states with written informed consent materials referring women to "crisis pregnancy centers" which acknowledged these centers did not support or provide women with abortion related services.

As of 2013, state Targeted Regulation of Abortion Providers (TRAP) law applied to medication induced abortions in addition to abortion clinics.

Following the passage of a 2013 Wisconsin law requiring abortion providers to have admitting privileges at a nearby hospital, three Catholic hospital systems in the state intended to deny admitting privileges to abortion providers. Wisconsin's attorney general said this intent violated the Church Amendment of 1973, which prohibits hospitals receiving federal funds from discriminating against a doctor on the basis of whether or not the doctor provides abortions or sterilizations.

In 2019, five bills sought to outlaw abortion in Wisconsin. As of May 2019, state law banned abortion after week 22. In 2019, Governor Tony Evers vetoed four Republican passed bills that would have limited abortion access. Specifically, the legislature passed a measure requiring abortion physicians to provide information on abortion reversal, a procedure that the scientific community sees as illegitimate and invalid, (Note: "Equally unscientific 'abortion reversal' laws are also gaining traction. These laws, now on the books in eight states, require doctors to tell patients receiving a medication abortion, a safe and effective way to end an early pregnancy, that it can be reversed halfway through to save their pregnancy. Not only is this law bad science, it is actively dangerous. The idea of abortion reversal is based on a single study of six participants that was (poorly) conducted without an ethics review board. The so-called abortion reversal procedure is experimental and has neither been clinically tested nor approved by the Food and Drug Administration. Both heartbeat bills and abortion reversal laws have been opposed by leading medical groups, including the American Medical Association and the American College of Obstetricians and Gynecologists." — Baran, Goldman, & Zlikova (2019)) as it is not based upon medically sound research. In addition, the legislature passed a bill that would eliminate all government funding for Planned Parenthood, as well as a ban on all abortions based upon the race, sex, or genetic anomaly of the fetus. Evers also vetoed a bill that would sentence doctors to life in prison for failing to provide infants with medical care if they are born alive during a botched abortion attempt. As of 2019, the state had a legal 24-hour waiting period before a woman could get an abortion.

=== Judicial history ===
In March 1970, U.S. District Judge Myron L. Gordon of the Eastern District of Wisconsin granted a declaratory judgment, stating that Wisconsin's contemporary abortion law was unconstitutionally vague. However, the ruling did not prohibit prosecutors from charging the plaintiff under different laws or from enforcing the same law to different defendants. The defendant in the March case was subsequently recharged for violating Wisconsin's abortion law. After that prosecution was also challenged in federal court, a three-judge panel granted an injunction in November 1970 forbidding the prosecution of any person under Wisconsin's law against abortion, thus effectively making abortion legal in Wisconsin. The annotations in Wisconsin's abortion statute list the March 1970 declaratory judgement as the point where Wisconsin's abortion ban was overturned, despite prosecutions and indictments for abortion continuing until the November 1970 injunction against enforcement. The U.S. Supreme Court's 1973 decision in the case of Roe v. Wade affirmed the ban issued by Judge Gordon.

After the passage of 2013 Wisconsin Act 37, which required all Wisconsin abortion providers to have hospital-admitting privileges, the law was almost immediately enjoined by U.S. district judge William M. Conley in response to a lawsuit filed by Planned Parenthood of Wisconsin. The law would have immediately required physicians providing abortion to obtain the right to admit patients at local hospitals, although federal law dictates that no hospital can deny a patient admission. Wisconsin already had a transfer agreement requirement established, which mandates that all facilities where abortion is performed have an agreement with a local hospital for patient transfer. Most in public health and clinical practice understand admitting privilege requirements—adopted by nine states, including Wisconsin—to be nonessential and not grounded in evidence-based practice. Further, as argued during the court proceedings, the law would have led to diminished access to abortion within the state. After trial, District Judge Conley struck down the admitting-privilege requirement.

The case, Planned Parenthood of Wisconsin v. Schimel, was appealed to the Seventh Circuit U.S. Court of Appeals by Wisconsin's then-Attorney General Brad Schimel. In November 2015, the Seventh Circuit upheld the district court's ruling. The state's primary defense of the admitting-privileges requirement centered on women's health. Specifically, if complications arose, the requirement presumed a continuity of care for the patient. The court's ruling, however, determined that the remarkably low rates of complications associated with abortion, and the state's failure to impose similar requirements on physicians providing riskier procedures rendered these claims moot.

Following the 7th Circuit's ruling, Attorney General Schimel petitioned the U.S. Supreme Court for review of the case; the Supreme Court chose not to hear the case, leaving the Appeals Court's ruling in place.

The legal situation was radically changed in 2022, when the U.S. Supreme Court overturned Roe v. Wade with their decision in Dobbs v. Jackson Women's Health Organization, No. 19-1392, 597 U.S. 215 (2022). After the Dobbs decision, abortion providers in Wisconsin immediately ceased elective abortions, fearing prosecution under the 1849 Wisconsin law, which banned abortion in all cases except to save the life of the mother. Josh Kaul—who had replaced Schimel as attorney general—filed a lawsuit disputing the enforceability of the old law, arguing that more recent changes to abortion law effectively repealed it. In 2023, a Dane County Wisconsin circuit court judge ruled that the 1849 law does not ban consensual abortions, but only prohibits foeticide.Planned Parenthood of Wisconsin announced it would resume abortion services in Madison and Milwaukee on September 18, 2023. Planned Parenthood of Wisconsin later announced it would resume abortion services in Sheboygan on December 28, 2023. On July 2, 2025, the Wisconsin Supreme Court struck down the 1849 law. It ruled that the valid law was a newer Wisconsin law based on fetal viability.

Planned Parenthood of Wisconsin announced it would stop abortion services amid federal funding cuts on September 24, 2025. Abortion services resumed on October 27, 2025.

=== Clinic history ===
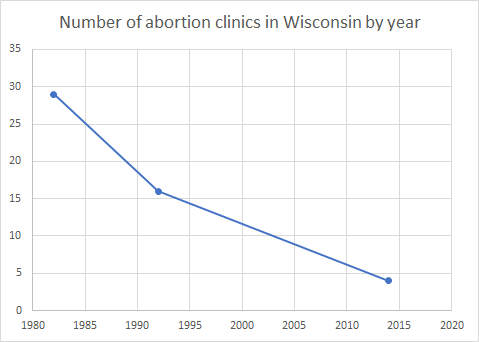
Number of abortion clinics in Wisconsin by year.

Between 1982 and 1992, the number of abortion clinics in the state declined by 13, going from 29 in 1982 to 16 in 1992. In 2013, Affiliated Medical Services was located in Milwaukee at 1428 N. Farwell Ave. Women going to the clinic often had to be accompanied due to protests outside. In 2014, there were 4 abortion clinics in the state. In 2014, 96% of the counties in the state did not have an abortion clinic. That year, 67% of women in the state aged 15–44 lived in a county without an abortion clinic. In March 2016, there were 22 Planned Parenthood clinics in the state. In 2017, there were 21 Planned Parenthood clinics, of which 2 offered abortion services, in a state with a population of 1,270,774 women aged 15–49.

== Statistics ==
In the period between 1972 and 1974, there were zero recorded illegal abortion deaths in the state. In 1990, there were 577,000 women in the state at risk of an unintended pregnancy. In 2001, Wisconsin and five other U.S. states did not provide any residence-related data regarding abortions performed in the state to the Centers for Disease Control. In 2013, among white women aged 15–19, there were 570 abortions, 200 abortions for black women aged 15–19, 90 abortions for Hispanic women aged 15–19, and 80 abortions for women of all other races. In 2014, 53% of adults in Wisconsin said in a poll by the Pew Research Center that abortion should be legal in all or most cases with 45% stating it should be legal in all or most cases. In 2017, the state had an infant mortality rate of 6.4 deaths per 1,000 live births.

Number of reported abortions, abortion rate and percentage change in rate by geographic region and state in 1992, 1995 and 1996
Census division and state	Number			Rate			% change 1992–1996
Census division and state	1992	1995	1996	1992	1995	1996	% change 1992–1996
East North Central	204,810	185,800	190,050	20.7	18.9	19.3	–7
Illinois	68,420	68,160	69,390	25.4	25.6	26.1	3
Indiana	15,840	14,030	14,850	12	10.6	11.2	–7
Michigan	55,580	49,370	48,780	25.2	22.6	22.3	–11
Ohio	49,520	40,940	42,870	19.5	16.2	17	–13
Wisconsin	15,450	13,300	14,160	13.6	11.6	12.3	–9

Number, rate, and ratio of reported abortions, by reporting area of residence and occurrence and by percentage of abortions obtained by out-of-state residents, US CDC estimates
Location	Residence			Occurrence			% obtained by out-of-state residents	Year	Ref
Location	No.	Rate	Ratio	No.	Rate	Ratio	% obtained by out-of-state residents	Year	Ref
Wisconsin	7,014	6.5	104	5,800	5.3	86	2.8	2014	
Wisconsin	6,731	6.2	100	5,660	5.2	84	3.5	2015	
Wisconsin	6,633	6.1	100	5,612	5.2	84	2.5	2016	
^number of abortions per 1,000 women aged 15–44; ^^number of abortions per 1,000 live births

== Activities and Organizations Associated with Abortion Rights ==
=== Organizations ===
Wisconsin Alliance for Reproductive Health is an organization that supports abortion rights. In May 2019, they were active in trying to overturn Wisconsin's 1849 era abortion ban.

=== Views ===
Wisconsin Alliance for Reproductive Health Executive Director Sara Finger said, "Wisconsin is not recognized as having some of the harshest abortion laws, but we're right up there with Texas and some others who do have that reputation."

=== Activism ===
On January 27, 2013, Planned Parenthood of Wisconsin marked the 40th anniversary of Roe v. Wade with an event titled "Our Lives. Our Stories. Our Celebration" at the Majestic Theater in Madison.

Much of the pro-life movement in the United States and around the world finds support in the Roman Catholic Church, the Christian right, the Lutheran Church–Missouri Synod, the Wisconsin Evangelical Lutheran Synod, the Church of England, the Anglican Church in North America, the Eastern Orthodox Church, and the Church of Jesus Christ of Latter-day Saints (LDS).

Specifically, organizations such as Pro-Life Wisconsin, Wisconsin Right to Life, and the Wisconsin Catholic Conference are actively working to limit or restrict access to abortion access within the state of Wisconsin. They all engage in outreach and education campaigns directed towards the general public, fundraising activities, and resources to churches and pastors for use in their own ministry. Further, each organization engages in policy and legal efforts to limit access to abortion, whether it is through testimonials before the state legislature on bills related to abortion, or assistance in court cases that challenge existing abortion restrictions.

=== Protests ===
Women from the state participated in marches supporting abortion rights as part of a #StoptheBans movement in May 2019.

Following the overturn of Roe v. Wade on June 24, 2022, in Wisconsin thousands of protesters gathered and marched in Madison, Milwaukee, Appleton, Eau Claire, Kenosha, Wausau, Marshfield, Stevens Point, Sheboygan, La Crosse and Green Bay.

In Madison, Wisconsin on January 22, 2023, more than 1,000 abortion rights protesters rallied at the state capitol building for the Women's March main event marking the 50th anniversary of the Roe v. Wade decision.

In Madison, Wisconsin on January 27, 2024, an abortion rights protest was held outside the state capitol building following Republican efforts to pass a bill on a 14-week abortion ban referendum.

In Milwaukee, Wisconsin on July 15, 2024, over 3,000 people protested Trump and Republican policies outside the Republican National Convention.

=== Violence ===
On April 1, 2012, a bomb exploded on the windowsill of a Planned Parenthood clinic in Grand Chute, Wisconsin, resulting in a fire that caused minimal damage.

On May 8, 2022, a crisis pregnancy center in Madison, Wisconsin was firebombed. The attack was claimed by Jane's Revenge, a militant pro-abortion rights group. In a statement issued after the attack, the group demanded the disbanding of pro-abortion organizations, with a threat of "increasingly extreme attacks", including a "Night of Rage" should Roe v. Wade be overturned by the Supreme Court.
