= Wisconsin Virtual Academy =

Coordinates: 43°00′50.9″N 89°17′56.8″W

Location
- 4709 Dale-Curtin Drive; McFarland, Wisconsin 53558; United States

Information
- Type: Virtual school
- Opened: 2002
- School district: McFarland School District
- Grades: Kindergarten – 12th grade
- Affiliation: K12 Inc.
- Website: wiva.k12.com

Wisconsin Virtual Academy (WIVA) is a virtual school administered as a charter school by the McFarland School District in McFarland, Wisconsin. The school is operated by the for-profit K12 Inc. corporation of Virginia.

== School history ==
The original WIVA was operated as a charter school of the Northern Ozaukee School District of Ozaukee County, Wisconsin from 2002 until 2009. In a December 2007 ruling, the Wisconsin Court of Appeals found that the operation violated Wisconsin school laws by misapplying the state's open enrollment statute. The issues were resolved with the Department of Public Instruction about the open enrollment statute and a cap on virtual school enrollment under Act 222 was imposed, limiting the number of virtual school students to 5,250.

In late 2008, WIVA changed its name to Wisconsin Virtual Learning (WVL). Beginning in the 2009–2010 school year it changed its curricula providers to Little Lincoln and Calvert for grades K–4. Lincoln Interactive, Calvert, Aventa, and Florida Virtual provide the curriculum for grades 5–12.

McFarland School District in Wisconsin opened a charter school called Wisconsin Virtual Academy (WIVA), supplied by K12 Inc., in the 2009–2010 school year.

== Curriculum and teaching ==
WIVA has Wisconsin-licensed teachers who help parents and students with their courses through video, phone, or e-mail contact. WIVA students are required to take Wisconsin State testing between October and November. Lessons are on the K12 Online School (OLS). Lessons include online reading followed by offline textbook work and a lesson test, called an assessment. At the end of the school day the parent records what courses their student worked on that day and how much time they spent. Teachers select key course lessons and have the student send the completed lessons to them though K-mail for lesson evaluation. Teachers also have complete access to the student's progress and test results. Teachers schedule classes that the majority of the WIVA students are currently working on, so that students can discuss the lessons together.

== Notable people ==
- Mark Gundrum's eight children, who were homeschooled through the school
