= Jill Karofsky =

American judge (born 1966)

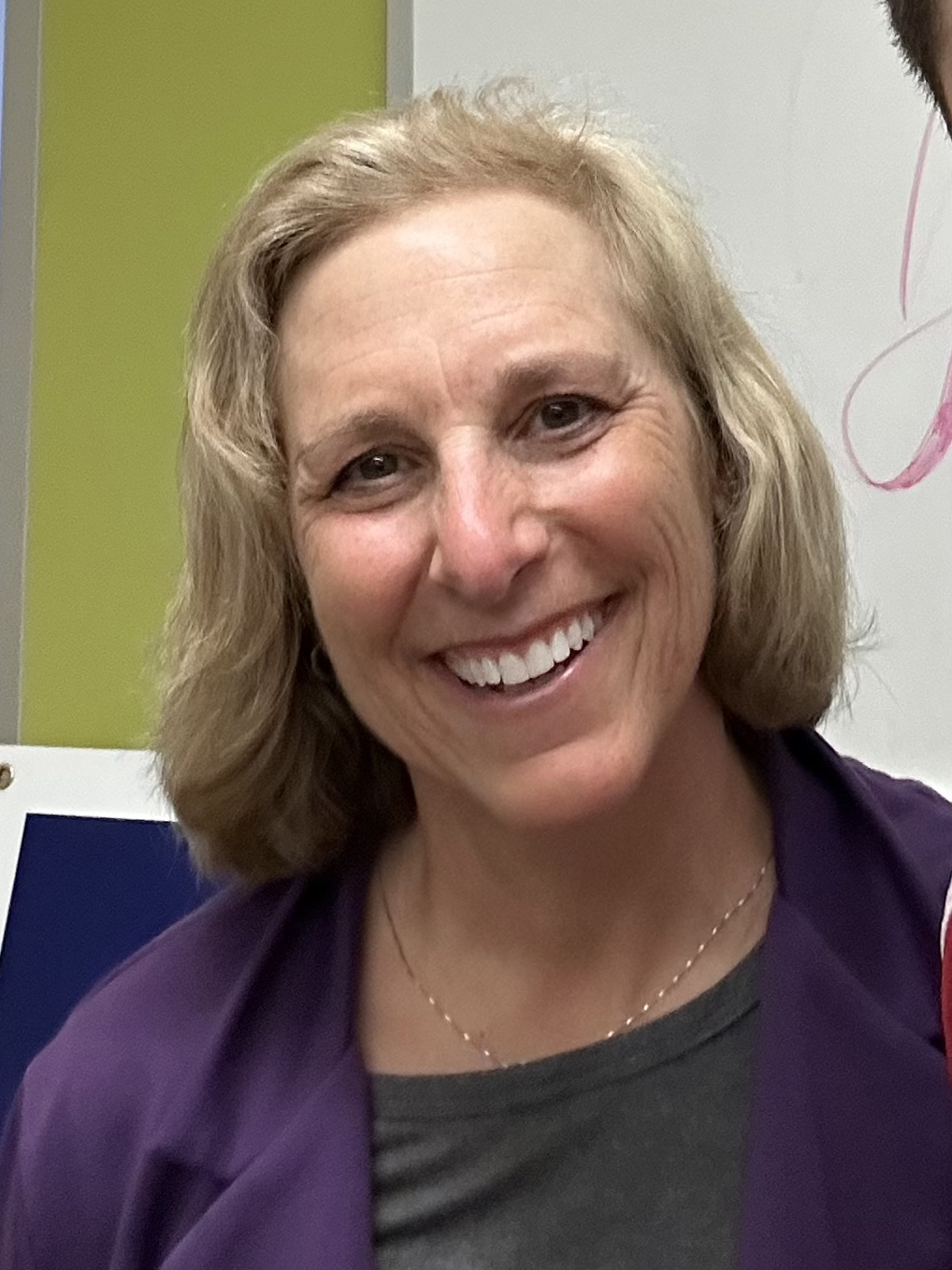
- Karofsky in 2020

29th Chief Justice of the Wisconsin Supreme Court
- Incumbent
- Assumed office July 1, 2025
- Preceded by: Ann Walsh Bradley

Justice of the Wisconsin Supreme Court
- Incumbent
- Assumed office August 1, 2020
- Preceded by: Daniel Kelly

Judge of the Dane County Circuit Court Branch 12
- In office August 1, 2017 – July 31, 2020
- Preceded by: Clayton Kawski
- Succeeded by: Chris Taylor

Personal details
- Born: Jill Judith Karofsky; July 15, 1966 (age 60) Middleton, Wisconsin, U.S.
- Party: Democratic
- Spouse: Jason Knutson (m. 1998; div. 2017)
- Children: 2
- Education: Duke University (BA); University of Wisconsin, Madison (MA, JD)
- Website: Campaign website

Jill Judith Karofsky (born July 15, 1966) is an American attorney and jurist from Madison, Wisconsin. She is the 29th and current chief justice of the Wisconsin Supreme Court, a position she has held since July 1, 2025. She has been a justice of the court since 2020, when she defeated incumbent justice Daniel Kelly. Before being elected to the Wisconsin Supreme Court, Karofsky served three years as a Wisconsin circuit court judge in Dane County (2017–2020). Earlier in her career, she served as an assistant district attorney in Dane County, and an assistant attorney general in the Wisconsin Department of Justice.

== Early life and legal career ==
Jill Karofsky was born on July 15, 1966, in Middleton, Wisconsin. During her childhood, her mother—Judy Karofsky—served as mayor of Middleton (1975–1977), and served several years on the city council; Jill's father, Peter Karofsky, was a pediatrician. Karofsky was a state tennis champion while at Middleton High School, where she graduated in 1984. She later played Division I sports for Duke University, where she received her Bachelor of Arts in 1988. Karofsky received her Juris Doctor from the University of Wisconsin Law School in 1992. She married attorney Jason Knutson in July 1998, though they later divorced.

Karofsky entered civil service as a deputy district attorney for Dane County. She has also served in the Wisconsin Department of Justice as Assistant Attorney General working as Wisconsin's Violence Against Women resource prosecutor, and later leading the Office of Crime Victim Services.

== Judicial career ==
In 2017, Karofsky was elected as a judge on the Dane County Circuit Court, beating municipal judge Marilyn Townsend by 15 points.

Three years later, Karofsky challenged incumbent Wisconsin Supreme Court Justice Daniel Kelly in Wisconsin's 2020 election. Kelly had been appointed to the Supreme Court by Republican then-Governor Scott Walker in 2016 and was endorsed by President Donald Trump. Karofsky was endorsed by over 100 current and former Wisconsin judges, including incumbent Wisconsin Supreme Court Justice Rebecca Dallet. She also received endorsements from U.S. Senator Tammy Baldwin, former governor Jim Doyle, and former U.S. senators Russ Feingold and Herb Kohl. In the final days before the election, Karofsky was endorsed by both the remaining 2020 Democratic Party presidential primary candidates—former Vice President Joe Biden and U.S. Senator Bernie Sanders.

The election became the most expensive judicial race in Wisconsin history up to that time, (Note: The record spending on the 2020 judicial election was quickly surpassed in 2023 ($45M) and further surpassed in 2025 ($100M).) with the campaigns raising a combined $10 million. During the campaign, Karofsky was the target of television attack ads funded by supporters of her opponent Daniel Kelly. The ads falsely claimed Karofsky, as deputy district attorney, struck a plea deal with a man charged with sexual assault of a minor resulting in no jail time. Karofsky was not placed on the case as a prosecutor until a year after the deal was struck. On March 27, 2020, Karofsky's campaign announced intent to file a cease and desist order against the ads. On April 6, 2020, Milwaukee County Circuit Judge Timothy Witkowiak blocked Karofsky's injunction against the ads on the grounds of unlawful prior restraint. The nonprofit fact checking site PolitiFact included the false claims against Karofsky in its yearly "Pants on Fire" review for 2020.

On April 13, 2020, Karofsky was declared the winner of the election, taking roughly 55% of the vote. She took office on August 1, 2020, and became the ninth woman in Wisconsin history to serve on the state's high court. Karofsky's upset election has been cited by Tom Perez, the Democratic National Committee Chair, as being indicative of the results of the 2020 presidential election.

In keeping with her marathon hobby, on August 1, 2020, Karofsky was sworn into office following the thirty-fifth mile of an "ultramarathon," by Wisconsin Supreme Court Justice Rebecca Dallet in a ceremony also attended by former governor Jim Doyle. She then ran another sixty-five miles.

=== 2020 Presidential election cases ===
Karofsky voted with the majority of the Wisconsin Supreme Court to dismiss several of Donald Trump's appeals as he sought to challenge the results of the 2020 United States presidential election in Wisconsin. As a result, she and Judge Rebecca Dallet, who also voted with the majority, were attacked in print and on social media with antisemitic and misogynistic comments and threats. The attacks prompted the chief justice, Patience D. Roggensack, to issue a statement condemning the threats.

=== Chief Justice ===
On April 3, 2025, Justice Ann Walsh Bradley was elected to a two-year term as court's chief justice beginning May 1. Because Bradley's judicial term expired on July 31, Karofsky was also elected to succeed Bradley as chief justice. Bradley officially stepped down as chief justice on July 1, 2025, and Karofsky succeeded her.

== Personal life ==
A single mother of two children (a son and a daughter), Karofsky lives in Madison, Wisconsin. She is a marathon runner and Ironman triathlete.

== Electoral history ==
=== Wisconsin Circuit Court (2017) ===
Wisconsin Circuit Court, Dane Circuit, Branch 12 Election, 2017
| Party | Candidate | Votes | % | ±% |
|---|---|---|---|---|
General Election, April 4, 2017
| Nonpartisan | Jill J. Karofsky | 50,585 | 57.54% | |
| Nonpartisan | Marilyn Townsend | 37,110 | 42.21% | |
| | Various Write in candidates | 218 | 0.25% | |
| Plurality | | 13,475 | 15.33% | |
| Total votes | | 87,913 | 100.0% | |

=== Wisconsin Supreme Court (2020) ===
Karofsky 40–60% Karofsky 60–70% Karofsky 70–90% Kelly 40–60% Kelly 60–70%

2020 Wisconsin Supreme Court election
| Party | Candidate | Votes | % | ±% |
|---|---|---|---|---|
Primary Election, February 18, 2020
| Nonpartisan | Daniel Kelly (incumbent) | 352,876 | 50.04% | |
| Nonpartisan | Jill J. Karofsky | 261,783 | 37.13% | |
| Nonpartisan | Ed Fallone | 89,184 | 12.65% | |
| | Various Write in candidates | 1,295 | 0.18% | |
| Total votes | | 705,138 | 100.0% | |
General Election, April 7, 2020
| Nonpartisan | Jill J. Karofsky | 855,573 | 55.21% | |
| Nonpartisan | Daniel Kelly (incumbent) | 693,134 | 44.73% | |
| | Various Write in candidates | 990 | 0.06% | |
| Plurality | | 162,439 | 10.48% | |
| Total votes | | 1,549,697 | 100.0% | |

== Notes ==
Legal offices
| Preceded by Daniel Kelly | Justice of the Wisconsin Supreme Court; 2020–present | Incumbent |
| Preceded by Ann Walsh Bradley | Chief Justice of the Wisconsin Supreme Court; 2025–present | Incumbent |
