= Wisconsin Supreme Court =

Highest court in U.S. state

Coordinates: 43.074635°N 89.384562°W

- Seal
- Interactive map of Wisconsin Supreme Court
- Established: 1848
- Jurisdiction: Wisconsin
- Location: Wisconsin State Capitol, Madison
- Composition method: Non-partisan statewide election
- Authorised by: Wis. Const., Art VII § 4
- Appeals to: Supreme Court of the United States
- Appeals from: Wisconsin Court of Appeals; Wisconsin circuit courts
- Judge term length: Ten years, no term limits
- Number of positions: 7
- Website: Wisconsin Court System

Chief Justice
- Currently: Jill Karofsky
- Since: July 1, 2025
- Lead position ends: April 30, 2027

The Wisconsin Supreme Court is the highest and final court of appeals in the state judicial system of the U.S. state of Wisconsin. As the highest court, the Supreme Court hears appeals of lower Wisconsin court decisions. Its decisions are binding on lower courts. It is the final authority on all matters of the Wisconsin State Constitution.

The Wisconsin Supreme Court may also take original jurisdiction of cases. The Court regulates and administers the conduct of judges and law practitioners in Wisconsin.

Justices on the Wisconsin Supreme Court are elected. Recent elections (2023 and 2025) received national attention, breaking records for the most expensive judicial elections in U.S. history. The most recent election has had a lower profile.

== Location ==
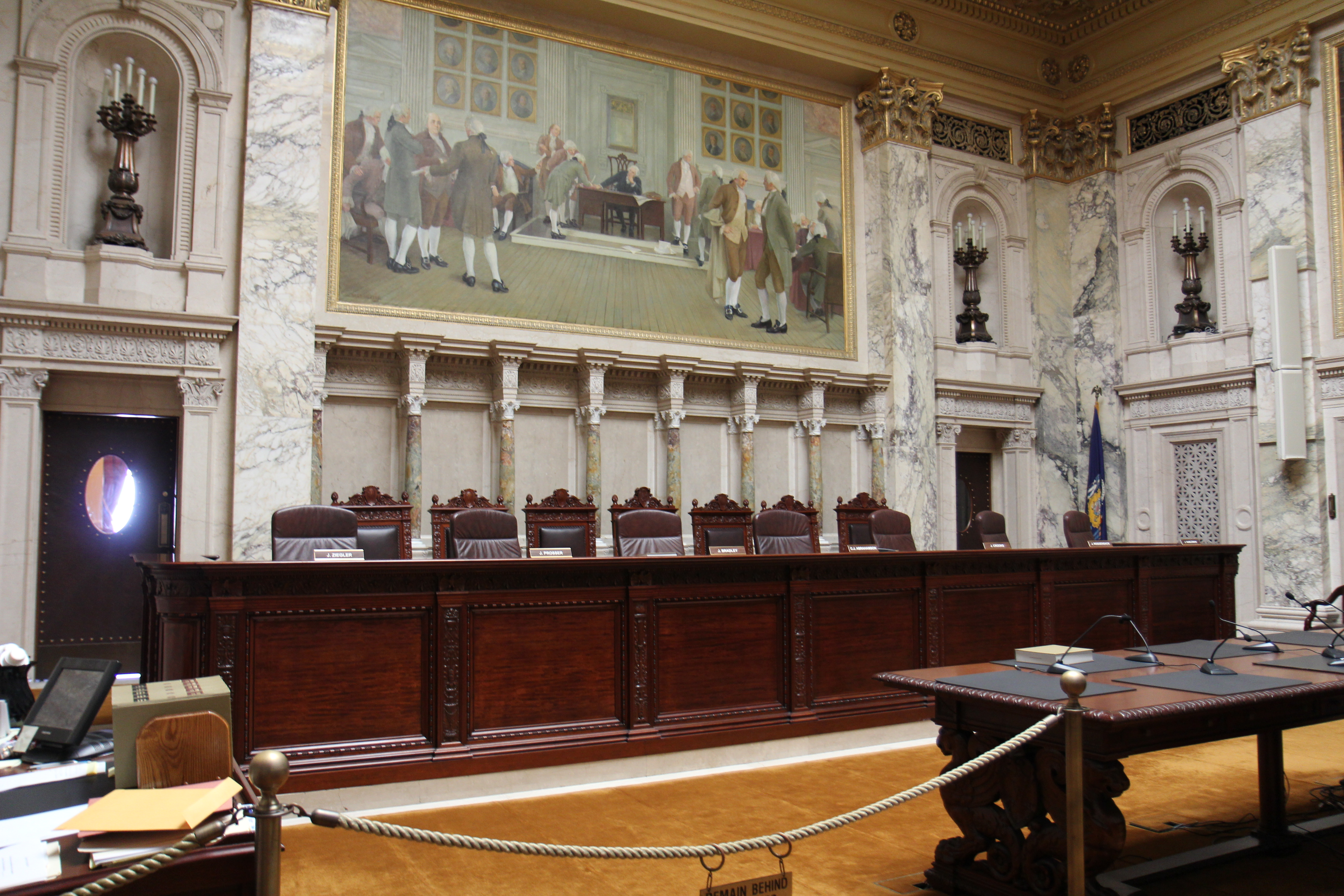
Interior of the Supreme Court room

The Wisconsin Supreme Court normally sits in its main hearing room in the East Wing of the Wisconsin State Capitol building in Madison, Wisconsin. Since 1993, the court has also traveled, once or twice a year, to another part of the state to hear several cases as part of its "Justice on Wheels" program. The purpose of this program is to give the people of Wisconsin a better opportunity to understand the operations of the state supreme court and the court system.

== Justices ==
The court is composed of seven justices who are elected in statewide, non-partisan elections. Each justice is elected for a ten-year term. Importantly, only one justice may be elected in any year. This avoids the sudden shifts in jurisprudence commonly seen in other state supreme courts, where the court composition can be radically shifted if two or three justices are simultaneously targeted for an electoral challenge based on their views on controversial issues. In the event of a vacancy on the court, the governor has the power to appoint an individual to the vacancy, but that justice must then stand for election in the first year in which no other justice's term expires.

After passage of a state constitutional amendment on April 7, 2015, the chief justice of the court is elected for a term of 2 years by the vote of a majority of the justices then serving on the court, although the justice so elected may decline the appointment. Prior to that amendment, the justice with the longest continuous service on the court served as the chief justice.

Though the court is officially nonpartisan, liberals are generally regarded as having a 5–2 majority over the body's conservative members. Justices Crawford, Dallet, Karofsky, Protasiewicz, and Taylor comprise the court's liberal wing, while Justices Hagedorn and Ziegler make up the conservative minority.

=== Current justices ===
The Wisconsin Supreme Court is notable for having the highest percentage of female justices among any top state court in the United States, as six of its seven justices are women. All seven are listed below.

Name	Born	Start	Chief term (Note: Terms end on April 30 of odd-numbered years.)	Term ends (Note: Terms end on July 31.)	Appointer (Note: Gubernatorial appointments may occur during midterm vacancies.)	Law school
Jill Karofsky, Chief Justice	July 15, 1966 (age 60)	August 1, 2020	2025–present	2030	—N/a (Note: Took office after being elected.)	Wisconsin
Annette Ziegler	March 6, 1964 (age 62)	August 1, 2007	2021–2025	2027	—N/a	Marquette
Rebecca Dallet	July 15, 1969 (age 57)	August 1, 2018	–	2028	—N/a	Case Western Reserve
Brian Hagedorn	January 21, 1978 (age 48)	August 1, 2019	–	2029	—N/a	Northwestern
Janet Protasiewicz	December 3, 1962 (age 63)	August 1, 2023	–	2033	—N/a	Marquette
Susan M. Crawford	March 1, 1965 (age 61)	August 1, 2025	–	2035	—N/a	Iowa
Chris Taylor	January 13, 1968 (age 58)	August 1, 2026	–	2036	—N/a	Wisconsin

== Chief justice selection ==
The members of the court choose their chief justice every two years by majority vote. This method of choosing the chief justice is a recent change, from a 2015 constitutional amendment. The change was controversial at the time, even leading to a federal lawsuit by the outgoing chief justice, Shirley Abrahamson, after the loss of her role to Patience Roggensack.

Prior to 2015, the chief justice was simply the longest continually-serving member of the court. This was the method for most of the court's history, since 1889. Prior to 1889, the court's chief justice was a separate seat on the court, elected by the public.

== Opinions ==
Since 2021, the Court has been issuing fewer decisions each year, as shown in the graph below. Although the number of opinions have declined, the average length of each opinion has increased. These longer opinions may or may not provide better guidance for lower courts or practicing attorneys when determining how to resolve disputes.

Wisconsin Supreme Court opinions by category, 2007–2025

- Civil
- Criminal
- Attorney Discipline
- Other

== Controversies ==
=== Recusal ===
Justices of the Wisconsin Supreme Court have disagreed on when they should recuse themselves from cases, especially in cases where the justices have campaigned on issues during their election or received campaign contributions from people or organizations involved in the case's legal proceedings.

Controversies with current court members can be traced to a 2009 United States Supreme Court case Caperton v. A.T. Massey Coal Co.. In this case, the U.S. Supreme Court held 5–4 that a campaign expenditure of over $3 million by a corporate litigant to influence the election of a judge in West Virginia to the court that would hear its case, although legal, was an "extreme fact" that created a "probability of bias", thus requiring the judge to be recused from hearing the case. Wisconsin had adopted a limit of $1,000 for campaign contributions to judges, but it was unclear when mandatory recusal was required. The League of Women Voters petitioned the Court to require a judge to recuse himself or herself from a proceeding if the judge had received any campaign contributions from a party or entity involved in it. Instead, during its 2009–2010 term and by a 4–3 vote, the Court adopted a rule that recusal is not required based solely on any endorsement or receipt of a lawful campaign contribution from a party or entity involved in the proceeding, and that a judge does not need to seek recusal where it would be based solely on a party in the case sponsoring an independent expenditure or issue advocacy communication in favor of the judge. Voting in favor of the new rule were Prosser, Gableman, Roggensack, and Ziegler. Voting against were Abrahamson, Crooks, and A. Bradley. In the opinion of Justice Roggensack, "when a judge is disqualified from participation, the votes of all who voted to elect that judge are cancelled for all issues presented by that case. Accordingly, recusal rules . . . must be narrowly tailored to meet a compelling state interest." In dissenting, Justice A. Bradley called the decision "a dramatic change to our judicial code of ethics" and took issue with the majority's decision to adopt a rule "proposed by special interest groups."

The issue of recusal became a major controversy again after the 2023 judicial election, but with the ideological positions reversed. Conservatives justice Rebecca Bradley and chief justice Annette Ziegler abandoned their previous position, which favored narrow recusal rules, and instead urged a broad recusal standard after Wisconsin elected a liberal majority to the Court in 2023. Their demand was targeted at the newest justice, Janet Protasiewicz, and was paired with a threat from the Republican Assembly speaker to begin an impeachment. At issue was the allegation that Protasiewicz had pre-judged pending redistricting cases, because she had remarked during the campaign that Wisconsin's legislative maps were "rigged". Several complaints were also filed against Protasiewicz with the Wisconsin Judicial Commission, but the commission quickly dismissed those complaints.

=== COVID-19 pandemic ===
The Wisconsin Supreme Court had two rulings early in the COVID-19 pandemic. First, in April 2020, the Court ruled that Governor Tony Evers could not delay the state's 2020 primary elections, despite public fears of COVID-19. In the following month, the Court struck down an order by the Wisconsin Department of Health Services to extend the Governor's stay-at-home order. The portion of the order that kept all K-12 schools closed for the remainder of the school year remained in effect. The deciding vote to strike down the Secretary-designate's order was by Daniel Kelly, who had recently lost his bid for re-election to Jill Karofsky.

=== Redistricting ===
The Wisconsin Supreme Court plays a role in determining the election maps in Wisconsin. The Court first reviewed maps in the 1890s, when they struck down state legislative maps and set standards for equal representation and district boundaries. This standard remained until federal guidance superseded these standards in the 20th century. The Court later reviewed a case about maps in the 1950s and even drew maps themselves in 1964. After these actions, the federal Voting Rights Act of 1965 and related United States Supreme Court cases deterred the Wisconsin Supreme Court from examining redistricting issues.

The Wisconsin Supreme court was prompted to revisit election maps in 2018 after the United States Supreme Court case of Gill v. Whitford reduced federal jurisdiction. In 2022, the Wisconsin Supreme Court took on redistricting again. At first, the Wisconsin Supreme Court allowed the Legislature's maps through the 2022 elections. After Janet Protasiewicz was elected to replace Patience Roggensack, however, the Wisconsin Supreme Court ruled against the Legislature in 2023 in Clarke v. Wisconsin Elections Commission. In February 2024, Governor Tony Evers signed new election maps into law, which were used for the 2024 Wisconsin elections.

== Elections ==
=== Laws ===
Justices are elected in nonpartisan elections for ten-year terms. Only one justice may be elected in any year. Justices are elected in the spring election, on the first Tuesday in April. If there are more than two candidates, a spring primary is held on the third Tuesday in February, as justices are nonpartisan elections.

The Wisconsin Constitution, as initially ratified in 1848, prohibited judicial elections from coinciding with general elections for state or county officers (such as gubernatorial elections), or within thirty days of any such election. The current wording of this clause in the constitution prohibits judicial elections from coinciding with any partisan general elections for such offices. In 1858, a state law was enacted scheduling judicial elections to be held the first Tuesday of April. A 1949 law change mandated that winners of judicial elections must secure a majority of the vote. Prior to this, justice candidates could win election with a mere plurality of the vote. This law change was implemented in time for the 1949 Supreme Court election. In April 1953, Wisconsin voters approved a legislatively-referred constitutional amendment so that all elections to the supreme court (even early elections held following vacancies) are for full ten-year terms. This means that rather than holding special elections for the remainder of an uncompleted term (as had been done previously), vacancies instead now can result in the date of the next regular election being advanced to an earlier year (also impacting the tentative scheduling of future elections beyond that). In April 1977 voters adopted a legislatively-referred constitutional amendment unifying the state's court system, which included the stipulation that no more than one seat on the state supreme court may be up for election within the same year. Consequentially, vacancies can only result in the year of the next election being shifted if there is a more immediate year without a scheduled contest.

An exception to the holding of supreme court elections on the first Tuesday in April took place in 1996. That year, the election was shifted to March 19 after Governor Tommy Thompson signed a bill into law that rescheduled both the 1996 spring general election and the state's presidential primaries in order to have the presidential primaries coincide with the Illinois, Michigan, and Ohio primaries already scheduled for March 19. This was done in hopes that Wisconsin could join those fellow Midwest states in forming a prominent "Big Ten primary" scheduled close after Super Tuesday in the major party primary calendars. This was not subsequently repeated.

=== Recent elections ===
From 2020 to 2025, Wisconsin Supreme Court elections were high-profile, national events. They became increasingly expensive. Spending grew from $4.3 million in 2016 to $100 million in 2025. In 2026, spending declined to less than $9 million total, in part due to the ideological balance of the court not being at stake.

The expensive elections from 2020 to 2025 shifted the court's ideological balance. In 2020, incumbent conservative justice Daniel Kelly lost re-election to liberal Dane County circuit judge Jill Karofsky. In 2023, the retirement of conservative Justice Patience Roggensack set up a high profile race between liberal Milwaukee County circuit judge Janet Protasiewicz and the conservative Kelly. Protasiewicz won the election, which changed the court's ideological balance and was expected to determine how the court ruled on cases involving abortion, voting rights, labor rights, and redistricting.

Further turnover followed in 2025, when liberal justice Ann Walsh Bradley retired; Susan M. Crawford won the open seat, keeping the ideological balance in the Court that liberals had won in 2023. In 2026, another open race emerged when conservative justice Rebecca Bradley announced she would not seek reelection. Liberal Court of Appeals judge Chris Taylor defeated conservative District II Court of Appeals Judge Maria Lazar in the race for this seat—extending the court's liberal majority to 5-2.

== See also ==
- Wisconsin Court of Appeals
- Wisconsin Circuit Court
- State supreme court
