= Timeline of the January 6 United States Capitol attack =

On January 6, 2021, the United States Capitol was attacked by rioters supporting United States President Donald Trump's attempts to overturn his defeat in the 2020 presidential election. Pro-Trump rioters stormed the United States Capitol after assembling on the Ellipse of the Capitol complex for a rally headlined as the "Save America March".

At the rally, Donald Trump Jr., Rudy Giuliani, and several Republican members of Congress addressed the crowd and repeated Donald Trump's false claims that electoral fraud affected the 2020 election outcome. In his hour-long speech, President Trump suggested marching towards the Capitol, assuring his audience he would be with them, to demand that Congress "only count the electors who have been lawfully slated", and "peacefully and patriotically make your voices heard". Towards his conclusion, he said "we fight. We fight like hell. And if you don't fight like hell, you're not going to have a country anymore."

The demonstrations turned violent with attendees breaching multiple police perimeters; assaulting Capitol police officers; and occupying, vandalizing, and ransacking parts of the building for several hours. Four people died that day: rioter Ashli Babbitt was fatally shot by a Capitol Police officer; two died of heart conditions; another died of an amphetamine intoxication. The next day, Capitol Police officer Brian Sicknick died after suffering two strokes, having been physically attacked and pepper sprayed during the riot.

All times are specified or approximated in Eastern Time, or UTC-5:00.

== Preceding events ==
=== July–October 2020 ===
- July 30: Trump casts skepticism on mail-in ballots at a press briefing. "I don't want to see [a term like 'projected winner']...a week after November 3rd or a month or, frankly, with litigation and everything else that can happen, years. Years. Or you never even know who won the election," he says. He adds: "I want an election and a result much, much more than you."
- September 23: Asked at a press briefing if he'll commit to a peaceful transfer of power, Trump responds: "The ballots are a disaster...Get rid of the ballots and you'll have a very — we'll have a very peaceful — there won't be a transfer, frankly. There'll be a continuation. The ballots are out of control."
- September 29: During a presidential debate, Trump orders members of the Proud Boys to "stand back and stand by." This direction by the President is well received by the Proud Boys, and white nationalist men begin to join in record numbers. Their membership will triple by January 6.
- October 31: Steve Bannon explains to associates that Trump has a "strategy": "What Trump's gonna do is just declare victory. Right? He's gonna declare victory. But that doesn't mean he's a winner. He's just gonna 'say' he's a winner."

=== November 2020 ===
- November 3:
  - Election Day. (Note: About 64% of voters voted early before November 3 in person or by mail, with the earliest state starting on September 4.)
  - On Election Night, 15–20 people in the White House move to the Green Room where Trump will wait for results. One of these people tells Trump loudly that the election was stolen. Others say: "Whoa, whoa, whoa, just let's go out and say there's still time, we need to do this count, we'll see you in the morning", as recalled by a guest in the residential part of the White House who spoke to investigators.
- November 4:
  - Trump addresses supporters at the White House and references the ongoing count of ballots, alleging an attempt to "disenfranchise" people who voted for him. He declares: "We won't stand for it ... We'll be going to the US Supreme Court; we want all voting to stop. We don't want them to find any ballots at 4 in the morning, and add them to the list ... We were getting ready to win this election. Frankly, we did win this election."
  - A Trump campaign employee learns that the ongoing vote count at TCF Center in Detroit suggests that Biden has won that region. The campaign employee texts an attorney and suggests rioting at the center; around that time, Trump supporters approach the center, challenging the vote count, according to prosecutors in December 2023.
- November 5:
  - Roger Stone dictates a message saying that "any legislative body" that has "overwhelming evidence of fraud" can choose their own electors to cast Electoral College votes.
  - Trump falsely claims that illegitimate ballots were dumped at a vote counting center in Detroit.
- November 7:
  - The Associated Press, Fox News, and the other major networks call Pennsylvania for Biden, thus putting him above the required 270 electoral votes to be named President-elect.
  - Senior staffers on the Trump campaign tell Trump that unless the election results are flipped in Arizona, Georgia, and Wisconsin, an event they assign only a 5–10% chance, he has lost.
  - Kenneth Chesebro tweeted (through an anonymous Twitter account) that "the big picture" was that "Trump doesn't have to get courts to declare him the winner of the vote. He just needs to convince Republican legislatures that the election was systematically rigged, but it's impossible to run it again, so they should appoint electors instead."
- November 9:
  - Trump fires Secretary of Defense Mark Esper and replaces him with Christopher C. Miller as acting Secretary.
  - Oath Keepers member Jessica Watkins sends text messages inviting people to the Oath Keepers' basic training in Ohio. One message says, "I need you fighting fit by innaugeration [sic]."
- November 10: Reacting to the firings of Esper and other top officials, CIA Director Gina Haspel privately tells Chair of the Joint Chiefs Milley that "we are on the way to a right-wing coup".
- November 13:
  - Trump's campaign manager tells him that a claim that many non-citizens have voted in Arizona is a false rumor.
  - Trump campaign attorneys concede in court that he did not win Arizona. This means he has lost the election for the presidency.
  - Sen. Lindsey Graham calls Georgia Secretary of State Brad Raffensperger regarding absentee-ballot procedures. Raffensperger later said he interpreted Graham's questions as suggesting legally cast absentee ballots might be excluded.
- November 14:
  - Trump announces that he is putting Rudy Giuliani in charge of challenging the election results.
  - Over 10,000 people gather in Freedom Plaza for the Million MAGA March in support of Trump's election fraud claims. Speakers include Alex Jones and Representative Marjorie Taylor Greene. Trump circles Freedom Plaza in his motorcade. Proud Boys, Oath Keepers, and Three Percenters are in attendance. Proud Boys skirmish with counter-protesters throughout the day. At least 20 people are arrested and two D.C. police officers are injured.
  - That evening, Trump praises his supporters who fought with counter-protesters. Near midnight, a massive "TRUMP LAW AND ORDER" banner is laid atop Black Lives Matter Plaza, then moved close to the White House.
- November 16:
  - Sidney Powell wrote that allegations against a voting machine company must be added to lawsuits in Georgia and Pennsylvania, alleging fraud that "REQUIRES THE ENTIRE ELECTION TO BE SET ASIDE".
  - In an internal communication with a Fox News producer, Tucker Carlson said he didn't believe the election fraud claims as presented by Sidney Powell and Rudy Giuliani. "Sidney Powell is lying," Carlson said, calling her "dangerous as hell" and "a complete nut. No one will work with her. Ditto with Rudy." Three days later, he wrote in an article that "we took Sidney Powell seriously... We've always respected her work and we simply wanted to see the details. ... So we invited Sidney Powell on the show. ... But she never sent us any evidence... When we checked with others around the Trump campaign ... they also told us Powell had never given them any evidence... We are certainly hopeful that she will [provide it]." He added that "this country will not be united" until everyone agreed on whether fraud had occurred.
- November 17: At a meeting of the Wayne County, Michigan, election board, canvassers Monica Palmer and William Hartmann initially refuse to certify Biden's victory, but faced with public opposition to their choice, they back down. At 9:53 p.m. and 10:04 p.m., with Trump on the line, Republican National Committee chair Ronna McDaniel calls Palmer's phone. Hartmann is also on the call. Trump tells the canvassers they'll look "terrible" if they certify the election results. McDaniel promises them: "we will get you attorneys." (Palmer publicly acknowledges the call at the time, but the recording is not published until three years later.)
- November 18:
  - Palmer and Hartmann try to take back their support for certification. Their request is denied.
  - Kenneth Chesebro sends his first memo on strategy. Focused on challenging the Wisconsin vote, Chesebro argued that "the Presidential election timetable affords ample time for judicial proceedings." He asserted that January 6 was the only deadline that mattered for settling a dispute over a state's legal slate of electoral votes. Citing the 1960 United States presidential election in Hawaii as an example of a competing slate of electors, Chesebro suggested that the Trump campaign should submit their own electoral certificates in Wisconsin on December 14 in preparation for the scenario that a court decision, or a "state legislative determination", is made in their favor.
- November 21: Women for America First files a permit application for a rally at the Lincoln Memorial on December 12. The group's original application for a rally in Freedom Plaza was denied because of inauguration preparations.
- November 22: Trump and Giuliani call the Arizona House Speaker and make false claims of election fraud.
- November 23: White House Counsel Pat Cipollone tells U.S. attorney general Bill Barr that Trump wants to speak to him. It is the first time Barr has met face-to-face with Trump since the election. The U.S. Attorneys' Offices had searched for fraud for two weeks and found none. In the meeting, Trump maintains falsehoods about the election. Barr tells Trump that his claims of sweeping fraud are "just not meritorious" and "not panning out." Barr reminds Trump that DOJ "is not an extension of your legal team." After the meeting, Mark Meadows tells Barr that he believes Trump "knows that there's a limit to how far he can take this." However, over the next week, Barr comes to believe that Trump is "maneuvering" in his meetings with state legislators. (Barr will have two more face-to-face meetings with Trump.)
- November 25: Trump tweeted in favor of suing the governor of Georgia for election fraud, despite previously admitting in private that Powell sounded "crazy". Sidney Powell then filed the lawsuit.

=== December 2020 ===
- December 1:
  - Giuliani meets with the Arizona House Speaker. Asked for evidence of election fraud, Giuliani says roughly: "We don't have the evidence, but we have lots of theories."
  - U.S. attorney general Bill Barr says, in an interview published on this day by the Associated Press, that there is no evidence of election fraud on a scale that would change the election outcome. When Trump hears that Barr has publicly contradicted him, he is so angry that he throws his lunch at the wall, according to a White House aide's testimony to the January 6 house committee on June 28, 2022. Trump and Barr meet in person for the second time since the election. Trump "was as mad as I've ever seen him," Barr later recalls. Barr offers to resign, and Trump accepts, but White House lawyers Pat Cipollone and Eric Herschmann follow Barr into the parking lot to persuade him otherwise. Barr ends up staying on for two more weeks.
- December 2:
  - Facebook disbands its Civic Integrity team, including the Group Task Force, after employees' vocal internal complaints about lack of action leaked and caused embarrassment. This slows enforcement against Facebook Groups and users spreading election misinformation and calling for political violence. The company also drops other emergency measures put in place for the election season.
  - On Facebook, Trump posts his speech about election fraud.
- December 3: Giuliani organized a presentation to the Georgia state senate, intending to persuade the senators to invalidate the real electors. Trump tweeted that it was "blockbuster testimony".
- December 6: Kenneth Chesebro sends his second memo on strategy. The memo expanded Chesebro's scope beyond Wisconsin into a national strategy. The strategy was to have Trump–Pence electors in six allegedly contested states submit their own "alternate" slates of purported electoral certificates in anticipation that Vice President Mike Pence would claim unilateral authority to count the votes in his role as President of the Senate. Chesebro stated that he believed the strategy was "constitutionally defensible" but acknowledged that the Supreme Court might rule against it and said he was "not necessarily advising" it. The memo was nevertheless written with a sense of urgency to act, its title being "Important That All Trump-Pence Electors Vote on December 14." Chesebro concluded the memo in stating that it "seems advisable for the campaign to seriously consider" his suggested course of action. Chesebro believed that his plan would focus the public's attention on alleged "electoral abuses by the Democrats" and to "buy the Trump campaign more time to win litigation that would deprive Biden of electoral votes and/or add to Trump's column".
- December 7:
  - The Arizona Republican Party asks supporters whether they are willing to give their lives fighting over the election results.
  - Sidney Powell's lawsuit against Georgia was dismissed.
  - Rudy Giuliani attempts to send this text message: "So I need you to pass a joint resolution from the legislature that states the election is in dispute, there's an ongoing investigation by the legislature, and the Electors sent by Governor Whitmer are not the official electors of the state of Michigan and do not fall within the Safe Harbor deadline under Michigan law." Because he had entered an incorrect number, the message did not send.
- December 8:
  - Trump campaign lawyer Jack Wilenchik emailed Trump campaign strategist Boris Epshteyn to explain the fake electors scheme. Wilenchik wrote: "We would just be sending in 'fake' electoral votes to Pence so that 'someone' in Congress can make an objection when they start counting votes, and start arguing that the 'fake' votes should be counted." Wilenchik helped organize the fake electors from Arizona. In a later email, adding a smiley face emoji, Wilenchik acknowledged that the term "alternative" sounded better than "fake."
  - Trump called the Georgia attorney general to pressure him.
  - One of Trump's senior campaign advisors expressed frustration that Giuliani's claims were unsubstantiated. "[I]t's tough to own any of this", he wrote in an email, "when it's all just conspiracy shit beamed down from the mothership."
  - General Michael Flynn receives a presidential pardon. He would later participate in the D.C. events on January 5.
- December 9: Kenneth Chesebro sends his third memo on strategy. The memo largely focused on providing a "general overview" of the legal requirements regarding the submission of electoral votes, under both federal law and the respective laws of the six states "in controversy". Chesebro additionally commented that, in spite of having no involvement from "the governor[s] or any other state official[s]", the Trump campaign's purported "alternate" electoral votes "might be eligible" for counting on January 6 if by then they were recognized "by a court, the state legislature, or Congress".
- December 10: At a Georgia House hearing, Giuliani falsely accused Ruby Freeman and Wandrea' ArShaye Moss of misconduct.
- December 12:
  - Proud Boys march through Freedom Plaza in Washington, D.C., in advance of the pro-Trump rally scheduled later in the day.
  - Pro-Trump rallies in Washington, D.C., attract thousands of Trump supporters protesting the election results, including numerous Proud Boys. Speakers include Michael Flynn, Sebastian Gorka, Alex Jones, podcaster David Harris Jr., Nick Fuentes, Mike Lindell and Oath Keeper's leader Stewart Rhodes. Jones says, "Joe Biden is a globalist, and Joe Biden will be removed one way or another." Fuentes gets the crowd to chant, "Destroy the GOP! Destroy the GOP!" Flynn tells the crowd that he is certain that Trump will be the next President. Rhodes calls on Trump to invoke the Insurrection Act, and warns that not doing so would lead to a "much more bloody war." Trump flies over the crowd several times in Marine One and tweets his appreciation for their support.
  - Violent clashes throughout the day between Proud Boys and counter-protesters lead to 33 arrests, including for assault on a police officer. That night, Proud Boy members vandalize four churches and burn a Black Lives Matter banner.
  - Kenneth Chesebro proposes to Matt Morgan and Mike Roman that they add legal language to all seven fake elector certificates to protect the fake electors who are named there. Roman texts Chesebro: "Fuck these guys." The language is added only to the certificates for Pennsylvania and New Mexico.
- December 13: A political consultant joins a phone call with Rudy Giuliani and a senior campaign advisor for Trump. (This call is later mentioned in the 2023 indictment of Trump. A New York Times report tries to identify the unnamed consultant as Boris Epshteyn.) Later that evening, Chesebro emailed a memo to Giuliani and others, which further explained his legal and logistical arguments in regards to his "President of the Senate" strategy. Chesebro proposed a "chronology" of events where Pence would recuse himself from serving as the presiding officer of the United States Senate on January 6, claiming that the Electoral Count Act imposed duties on his role that go "beyond those set out in the Constitution", and that he would have a conflict of interest if he were to fill the role of senate president while being a candidate for the vice presidency. The votes would instead be opened by the president pro tempore, Chuck Grassley, or by "another senior Republican". During the counting procedure, the presiding officer would claim unilateral authority and obstruct the counting of the electoral votes of Arizona, arguing that the presence of both the Biden-Harris electoral votes and the Trump-Pence purported "alternate" electoral votes comprises a conflict of two competing slates of electors from the same state. The presiding officer would announce that Arizona would have to "rerun the election", "engage in adequate judicial review", or "have its legislature appoint electors", if it wanted to be represented in the electoral college results. The U.S. House select committee on the January 6 attack will later conclude that Chesebro drafted this strategy "upon request from Trump Campaign official Boris Epshteyn."
- December 14:
  - Biden wins the Electoral College vote.
  - Trump electors for Arizona, Georgia, Michigan, Nevada, Pennsylvania, and Wisconsin, all of which Biden won in the election, cast purported electoral votes for Trump. The "votes" cast by the pro-Trump "alternate electors" have no legal standing. The pro-Trump groups in five states sent their fake electoral votes to the National Archives, but the National Archives did not forward these to Congress, because under the Electoral Count Act, only slates certified by the states are forward to Congress.
  - One America News releases a video about Trump's reelection efforts with a voiceover stating, "Supporters of President Trump are continuing to fight for four more years, storming the nation's capital to participate in dueling rallies."
  - Attorney General William Barr tells Trump he will resign. It is their third and final face-to-face meeting since the election. Trump accepts his resignation, and it is publicly announced. Barr recommends, as his replacement, Jeffrey A. Rosen as Acting Attorney General and Richard Donoghue as deputy. Trump accepts these suggestions and begins to pressure Rosen and Donoghue to investigate the election.
- December 15:
  - The Trump campaign mails a certificate with the names of the fake electors for Michigan. (Three weeks later, the post office tracking will continue to say "in transit".)
  - Trump summoned incoming acting Attorney General Jeffrey Rosen and incoming acting Deputy Attorney General Richard Donoghue, who explained to him that Giuliani's claims of fraud at the State Farm Arena in Georgia were false.
- December 16: The national council of "The Three Percenters – Original" group, one of the largest Three Percenter militias, issues a statement alleging that "there was widespread fraud perpetrated against the American people." The statement continues,
  We stand ready and are standing by to answer the call from our President should the need arise that We The People are needed to take back our country from the pure evil that is conspiring to steal our country away from the American people. We are ready to enter into battle with General Flynn leading the charge. We will not act unless we are told to. And we will not act on our own as TTPO, but rather as a united body of American patriots.
  — The National Council, The Three Percenters – Original
  - A luncheon at Trump International Hotel results in a draft Executive Order. The order would direct the Secretary of Defense to immediately seize voting machines and would establish Sidney Powell as a "Special Counsel" empowered to "oversee this operation and institute all criminal and civil proceedings ".
  - Sen. Ron Johnson, chairman of the Senate Homeland Security and Governmental Affairs Committee, held the hearing "Examining Irregularities in the 2020 Election." The hearing featured attorneys and witnesses advancing numerous allegations of election fraud that had already been rejected by state officials and courts. Although the hearing also included testimony from former CISA director Christopher Krebs defending the integrity of the election, it was the first official Senate committee hearing devoted to claims that the election result should be questioned after the Electoral College had voted.
- December 17: Rep. Paul Gosar claims that Trump won Arizona because of the alleged data theft of 700,000 votes.
- December 18:
  - Unscheduled meeting between Sidney Powell, Michael Flynn, and Patrick Byrne ("outside group") and Trump. White House Counsel Pat Cipollone joins immediately upon learning of it. The outside group advances Flynn's proposal that the president declare martial law and (according to Eric Herschmann's recollection) suggests that Venezuela meddled in the election. Trump, contrary to his advisors' opinions, suggests naming Powell as a special counsel to investigate alleged election fraud. The two camps are "shouting at each other, throwing insults at each other" (according to Derek Lyons, former White House staff secretary). The meeting shifts to Yellow Oval and breaks up after midnight. Mark Meadows escorts Giuliani so he won't "wander back into the mansion".
  - Army Secretary Ryan McCarthy and Army Chief of Staff General James McConville put out a statement: "There is no role for the U.S. military in determining the outcome of an American election." In response, Trump aide Jonny McEntee wrote a note: "[Acting Defense Secretary] Chris Miller spoke to both of them and anticipates no more statements coming out. (If another happens, he will fire them)." Though this note was torn up, the House select committee later recovered it.
  - To reserve a room for January 6, 2021 at Trump's D.C. hotel, customers will pay at least $476.
- December 19:
  - 1:42 a.m. – Trump announces the January 6 rally on Twitter, stating: "Statistically impossible to have lost the 2020 Election. Big protest in D.C. on January 6th. Be there, will be wild!"
  - Speaking at a rally in Arizona, Ali Alexander appears to advocate for violence against Republican members of Congress who do not fight to overturn the election results.
- December 20:
  - The domain name wildprotest.com is registered to host a website advertising a protest near the Capitol building from 10 a.m. to 5 p.m. on January 6.
  - Congresswoman-elect Marjorie Taylor Greene text-messages U.S. Senator Kelly Loeffler, inviting her to a White House meeting with Trump and members of Congress who plan to "challenge the Electoral College votes for Biden in several key swing states on January 6", as Greene phrased it.
  - To reserve a room for January 6, 2021 at Trump's D.C. hotel, customers will pay at least $1,999 — four times more than two days previously.
- December 21: According to Rep. Mo Brooks (R-Ala.), Trump met with several Republican Members of Congress at the White House to discuss "the planning and strategy for January the 6th." Brooks told Politico there are plans to challenge the results in six states, said total debate time could clock in at around 18 hours. That means the vote-counting process could bleed into the wee hours of Jan. 7. Attendees include Vice President Mike Pence, Mark Meadows, Rudy Giuliani, Rep. Andy Biggs (R-Ariz.), Rep. Matt Gaetz (R-Fl.), Rep. Louie Gohmert (R-Tx.) Rep. Jody Hice (R-Ga.), Rep. Jim Jordan (R-Ohio), and Rep.-elect Marjorie Taylor Greene (R-Ga.).
- December 22:
  - Oath Keepers' Florida chapter leader Kelly Meggs writes on Facebook "Trump said It's gonna be wild!!!!!!!", adding "It's gonna be wild!!!!!!! He wants us to make it WILD that's what he's saying. He called us all to the Capitol and wants us tomakeitwild!!!! SirYesSir!!! [sic] Gentlemen we are heading to DC pack your shit!!"
  - George Papadopoulos receives a presidential pardon. He would later participate in the D.C. events of January 5.
- December 23:
  - Phil Waldron texted Mark Meadows, informing him that an Arizona judge had dismissed a lawsuit in which GOP lawmakers demanded access to voting machines. Waldron acknowledged that his opponents might try to "delay" him from accessing the machines. Meadows replied: "Pathetic".
  - Roger Stone receives a presidential pardon. He would later participate in the DC events of January 5.
  - John Eastman wrote a memo on January 6 strategy proposing that "Pence then gavels President Trump as re-elected ...The main thing here is that Pence should do this without asking for permission..." At 1:32 p.m., Eastman emailed Trump's assistant asking to speak to the president about "strategic thinking." Five minutes later, the White House called Eastman; the call lasted nearly 23 minutes.
  - Trump tweeted an allegation that Georgia officials were deliberately hiding evidence of fraud.
- December 24: Pence wrote himself a note: "Not feeling like I should attend electoral count. Too many questions, too many doubts, too hurtful to my friend [Trump]. Therefore, I'm not going to participate in certification of election."
- December 25: Pence called Trump to wish him a merry Christmas. Trump changed the subject, asking Pence to reject electoral votes on January 6, to which Pence objected. Pence admonished Trump: "You know [that] I don't think I have the authority to change the [election] outcome". (The line appeared in Pence's memoir with a comma after "you know", implying that the phrase was merely conversational; Pence told prosecutors that the comma should not have been printed.)
- December 27:
  - In a phone call, discussing the allegations about State Farm Arena in Georgia, acting Attorney General Jeffrey Rosen and acting Deputy Attorney General Richard Donoghue remind Trump that "DOJ can't and won't snap its fingers and change the outcome of the election." They say they have reviewed video and interviewed witnesses, yet there is no evidence of fraud. Trump replies: "Just say that the election was corrupt and leave the rest to me and the R[epublican] Congressmen".
  - President Trump promotes the January 6 rally on Twitter.
- December 28:
  - Jeffrey Clark drafts a letter to Georgia's governor and leaders of the Georgia House and Senate. The letter asks the Georgia General Assembly to call a "special session" to consider claims of election irregularities, decide who "won the most legal votes," and "take whatever action is necessary to ensure that one of the slates of Electors cast on December 14 will be accepted by Congress on January 6." Pat Cipollone warns Trump that the letter will "damage everyone who touches it. And we should have nothing to do with that letter." Rosen and Donoghue refuse to sign the letter, and it is not sent. (It is later mentioned in ethics charges filed against Clark on July 19, 2022.)
- December 30:
  - President Trump again announces the date of the January 6 rally on Twitter.
  - The domain name MarchtoSaveAmerica.com is registered.
  - A popular far-right YouTuber posted a video in which he said he anticipated over a million "armed Americans" would be in the streets for a "red wedding" on January 6, a reference to a fictional massacre in Game of Thrones.
  - Sen. Josh Hawley became the first U.S. senator publicly to announce that he would object to certification on January 6. Until then, House Republicans had objectors lined up, but no senator had committed, meaning no objection could succeed procedurally.
  - Senator Mike Lee texts Trump advisor Cleta Mitchell, opposing the January 6 plan as "a dangerous idea ... for the republic itself ... [w]ill you please explain to me how this doesn't create a slippery slope problem for all future presidential elections?"
- December 31:
  - By this date, the wildprotest.com website settles on a protest location just northeast of the Capitol building. On New Year's Eve, District of Columbia Mayor Muriel Bowser requests a limited national guard deployment as downtown merchants began boarding up their businesses.
  - The Berkeley Research Group, hired by the Trump campaign to investigate whether there had been voter fraud, had found nothing, and at some point during the last few days of December, they reported this to Trump and Meadows on a conference call.
  - Trump signs his fraud allegations in his lawsuit against Georgia, and Eastman helps him file it, even though Eastman acknowledges in an email that Trump knows some of these allegations are false.
  - To reserve a room for January 6, 2021 at Trump's D.C. hotel, customers are shown a price of $8,000.

=== Friday, January 1, 2021 ===
- National Park Service grants a permit for a First Amendment rally "March for Trump" at The Ellipse to Women for America First (chaired by Amy Kremer, co-founder of Women for Trump), with an estimated attendance of 5,000.
- Trump tweets the date and time of the January 6 rally. He then retweets a supporter who wrote, "The calvary [sic] is coming, Mr. President! JANUARY 6th | Washington, DC", to which Trump responds, "A great honor!".
- Trump phones Pence and tells him his refusal to participate in the scheme is "too honest".

=== Saturday, January 2, 2021 ===
- On a conference call with Georgia Secretary of State Brad Raffensperger, Trump claimed that "we have won this election in Georgia," and he demanded from Raffensperger: "I just want to find, uh, 11,780 votes, which is one more than [the 11,779 vote margin of defeat] we have, because we won the state." He warned Raffensperger that he was taking a "big risk" by not signing on to the false claim of a Trump victory.
- Thirteen U.S. senators, including Ted Cruz and Josh Hawley, along with 100 Republican members of the House, vow to object to the election certification.
- Amy Kremer of Women for America First announces a rally at the Ellipse in Washington, D.C., on January 6 starting at 7 am.
- Carol Corbin (DOD) texts United States Capitol Police (USCP) Deputy Chief Sean Gallagher, Protective Services Bureau, to determine whether USCP is considering a request for National Guard soldiers for January 6, 2021, event

=== Sunday, January 3, 2021 ===
- USCP Deputy Chief Gallagher replies to DOD via text that a request for National Guard support is not forthcoming at this time after consultation with USCP COP Sund.
- Trump announces that he will be at the Ellipse rally.
- Trump orders recently appointed secretary of defense Christopher C. Miller to "do whatever was necessary to protect the demonstrators" on January 6.
- Trump falsely claims that Raffensperger didn't address his fraud allegations.
- Dustin Stockton, a former Breitbart employee helping to plan the Ellipse event, helps move speakers to the January 5 rally to make room for Trump to speak at the Ellipse rally.
- A 1:00 p.m. protest at the U.S. Capitol is added to the January 6 rally announcement on the March to Save America website.
- An internal Capitol Police intelligence report warns that enraged protesters flanked by white supremacists and extreme militia groups are likely to arrive in Washington armed for battle and target Congress on January 6.
- The National Park Service issues a permit to "Rally to Revival" for the January 5 rally in Freedom Plaza. The permit notes that there is no march associated with the event.
- In a heated Oval Office meeting, Trump pushes his plan to install Jeffrey Clark as head of DOJ. (Clark, the top energy lawyer at DOJ, supports Trump's false claims of election fraud.) Officials from the DOJ and White House tell Trump they do not support this plan, and some issue ultimatums: Acting attorney general Jeffrey Rosen, his deputy Richard Donoghue, and Office of Legal Counsel head Steven Engel all threaten to resign if Trump installs Clark.
- Clark discusses the scheme with deputy White House counsel Patrick Philbin. Philbin warns him that Trump can't simply seize power, as Americans will riot. Clark replies that the Insurrection Act could be used to quell the protests.
- Pence asked the Senate parliamentarian if there were any other electors whose votes he should consider during the certification. (In August 2023, Pence told NBC that he asked her this because he had heard "rumors...in the newspaper" of alternate electors and that he "doesn't recall" if the White House had directly informed him of the scheme.)

=== Monday, January 4, 2021 ===
- In the morning, John Eastman calls the Arizona House Speaker, admitting he's unfamiliar with the local "facts on the ground" yet urging the Arizona House Speaker to use the state legislature to decertify the real electors and "let the courts sort it out."
- USCP COP Sund asks Senate Sergeant at Arms (SSAA) Michael Stenger and House Sergeant at Arms (HSAA) Paul Irving for authority to have National Guard to assist with security for the January 6, 2021, event based on briefing with law enforcement partners and revised intelligence
- COP Sund's request is denied. SSAA and H.SAA tells COP Sund to contact General Walker at DC National Guard to discuss the guard's ability to support a request if needed.
- COP Sund notifies General Walker of DC National Guard, indicating that the USCP may need DC National Guard support for the January 6, 2021, but does not have the authority to request at this time.
- General Walker advises COP Sund that in the event of an authorized request, DC National Guard could quickly repurpose 125 troops helping to provide DC with COVID-related assistance. Troops would need to be sworn in as USCP.
- Proud Boys leader Enrique Tarrio is arrested in D.C. and charged for burning a Black Lives Matter banner on December 12 and possession of two high capacity firearm magazines that were in his possession at the time of his arrest.
- Secretary of Defense Miller issued orders which prohibited deploying D.C. Guard members with weapons, helmets, body armor or riot control agents without his personal approval.
- Rally organizer Kylie Kremer (daughter of Amy Kremer) texted MyPillow CEO Mike Lindell: "This stays only between us, we are having a second stage at the Supreme Court again after the ellipse. POTUS is going to have us march there/the Capitol. It cannot get out about the second stage because people will try and set up another and Sabotage it. It can also not get out about the march because I will be in trouble with the national park service and all the agencies but the POTUS is going to just call for it 'unexpectedly.' If anyone tells you otherwise, it's not accurate info. Only myself and [name of White House liaison, redacted by Inspector General for the Interior Department] know full story of what is actually happening and we are having to appease many people by saying certain things."
- The National Park Service forecast the protest crowd size at 15,000. (Nearly three years later, the Interior Department's Inspector General concluded that Kylie Kremer's group Women for America First had lied to NPS, falsely claiming there would be no march. The Inspector General also concluded that NPS failed to inspect the site, keep photographs documenting what the site originally looked like before the demonstration, advise that backpacks and bags were prohibited, and review WFAF's safety documentation.)
- 1:41 p.m.: Mickael Damelincourt, managing director of Trump's D.C. hotel, tweets: "Looking forward to seeing many of you this week..."
- 3:30 p.m.: Trump campaign lawyer Matt Morgan emails Kenneth Chesebro to ask if Congress has received all the documents for the slates of fake electors. Chesebro replies that he should ask campaign official Mike Roman. At 4:55, Morgan resends the inquiry to Chesebro and Roman. Roman replies that the Michigan document has not arrived yet and that he plans to use a "courier tomorrow". Morgan replies at 8:41 that they may "need to enlist the help of a legislator who can deliver to the appropriate place(s)" and that they should discuss it with Rudy Giuliani "to make sure this gets done the way he wants." Chesebro tells Roman to "write Jim Troupis and have him check immediately with [Senator] Ron Johnson" whether a courier may give the documents to a Johnson staffer who can give them to Pence. At 11:29, Roman tells them that a staffer in Wisconsin should take a morning flight from Chicago to Washington. Roman offers to go to the Washington airport to receive the documents from the courier and bring them to a Johnson staffer; Chesebro replies that he can do this. He advises not to "wait until morning of 6th". At 11:49, Roman updates Chesebro: "You need Michigan and Wisconsin. So you'll be picking up 2". At 11:54, he adds that Chesebro will need to take them to "2 separate people."
- Pence took notes at a meeting, recording that Trump repeated false claims such as that he "won every state by 100,000 of votes" and that there were "205,000 votes more in PA than voters." These notes were revealed in the federal indictment of Trump.
- Representative Liz Cheney is accidentally included on a call between Trump's allies, and she listens as they plot to convince Pence to obstruct or delay the vote count.

=== Tuesday, January 5, 2021 ===
- Shortly after midnight, former Republican House Speaker Paul Ryan texts Liz Cheney: "I worry he [Pence] breaks but think he will not."
- 8:57 a.m.: Steve Bannon calls Trump. They speak for 11 minutes.
- After the phone call, Bannon addresses his podcast audience: "All hell is going to break loose tomorrow. We're on ... the point of attack ... strap in."
- Anika Collier Navaroli, a member of Twitter's safety team, says on an internal call: "I am very concerned about what happens tomorrow, especially given what we have been seeing. For months we have been allowing folks to maintain and say on the platform that they're locked and loaded, that they're ready to shoot people, that they're ready to commit violence." (She later testifies that Twitter was reluctant to suspend Trump because he was one of their most powerful and popular users.)
- After 10 a.m. in Washington, a Wisconsin GOP official lands with the fake elector documents for that state. Around 1 p.m., Trump campaign aide Michael Brown (whose flight has been booked and paid for by the Trump campaign) lands with the Michigan certificates. Both individuals are scheduled to go to the Trump International Hotel in Washington to give the documents to Chesebro. Chesebro and Brown together walk to the Longworth Office Building and hand off the documents to a staffer for a Pennsylvania GOP lawmaker (either for Rep. Scott Perry or Rep. Mike Kelly).
- In the morning, thousands of Trump supporters gather at Freedom Plaza near the White House in advance of planned protests against the certification of Joe Biden as President-elect. The first rally is the March to Save America from 1–2 p.m., then Stop the Steal from 3:30–5:00 p.m., followed by the Eighty Percent Coalition from 5:00–8:30 p.m.
- Capitol Police Chief Steven Sund holds a teleconference with top law enforcement and military officials from D.C., including the FBI, U.S. Secret Service and the National Guard; Sund later wrote no entity provided any intelligence indicating that there would be a coordinated violent attack on the United States Capitol by thousands of well-equipped armed insurrectionists.
- U.S. House Representative Zoe Lofgren (D-CA) holds a teleconference with Capitol Police Chief Steven Sund and House Sergeant-at-Arms Paul Irving; Sund tells Lofgren that the National Guard is on standby and that Capitol Police are well-staffed and prepared for the protests.
- After speaking with Representative Lofgren, Sund reiterates to Representative Tim Ryan (D-OH) that Capitol Police are prepared.
- D.C. National Guard Commanding Major General William J. Walker receives new orders from Secretary of the Army Ryan McCarthy stating that he must seek approval from McCarthy and Defense secretary Miller before preparing to respond to a civil disturbance. Previously, he had authority to respond without first seeking permission.
- At least ten people are arrested during the evening and into Wednesday morning, several on weapons charges.
- 3:56 p.m.: A guest in Trump's D.C. hotel posts a photo of herself in the lobby with Phil Waldron.
- Federal Protective Service officers notice protesters trying to camp on federal property.
- DC Mayor Bowser writes letter to Acting Secretary Miller and other authorities that the District government is not requesting further operational help in managing the expected protest crowd.
- Representative Jim Jordan forwarded a text message to Mark Meadows. It said:
  "On January 6, 2021, Vice President Mike Pence, as President of the Senate, should call out all electoral votes that he believes are unconstitutional as no electoral votes at all – in accordance with guidance from founding father Alexander Hamilton and judicial precedence. 'No legislative act,' wrote Alexander Hamilton in Federalist No. 78, 'contrary to the Constitution, can be valid.' The court in Hubbard v. Lowe reinforced this truth: 'That an unconstitutional statute is not a law at all is a proposition no longer open to discussion.' 226 F. 135, 137 (SDNY 1915), appeal dismissed, 242 U.S. 654 (1916). Following this rationale, an unconstitutionally appointed elector, like an unconstitutionally enacted statute, is no elector at all."
- Pipe bombs were placed outside the Washington, D.C., offices of the RNC and DNC national headquarters between 7:30–8:30 p.m., according to the FBI. The bombs were found the next day. Surveillance video shows a suspect who, as of 2025, remained unidentified.
- Trump made several calls to his associates at the Willard Hotel, where a command center or "war room" had been established in a set of rooms and suites. Trump personal attorney Rudy Giuliani, Bannon, Eastman, and Boris Epshteyn led the team. Michael Flynn, Roger Stone and Bernard Kerik were also present. Trump called to tell them that Pence was refusing the Pence Card strategy that Eastman had proposed earlier in the day in an Oval Office meeting. He discussed ways to delay the certification in order to get alternate slates of electors for Trump sent to Congress, as he, Giuliani and Eastman had discussed by conference call with 300 state legislators on January 2. Trump discussed some topics only with lawyers at the Willard so as to preserve the confidentiality afforded by attorney-client privilege.
- 9:46 p.m.: Steve Bannon calls Trump. They speak for 6 minutes.
- 10:00 p.m.: Kayleigh McEnany texts Elliot Gaiser at approximately this time, asking him whether Pence has the power to object to the election results. She later told the January 6th committee that she was curious about this possibility because, earlier that day or the day before, she had overheard Trump discussing it in the Oval Office with an outside attorney (whom she believed was John Eastman) on speakerphone, while Corey Lewandowski listened in person in the Oval Office.

== Attack on the Capitol ==
At noon, Trump began an over one-hour speech at the Ellipse, encouraging protesters to march to the U.S. Capitol. At 12:49 p.m., Capitol Police responded to reports of an explosive device, later identified as a pipe bomb. At 12:53 p.m., eighteen minutes before Trump's speech ended, rioters overran police on the west perimeter of restricted Capitol grounds. At 2:13 p.m., rioters first gained entry to the interior of the Capitol after smashing windows on the Senate wing near S139.

At 2:44 p.m., a Capitol Police officer inside the Speaker's Lobby adjacent to the House chambers shot and killed rioter Ashli Babbitt as she climbed through a broken window of a barricaded door. Minutes later, Governor of Virginia Ralph Northam activated all available assets of the State of Virginia including the Virginia National Guard to aid the U.S. Capitol, although the Department of Defense still had not authorized it. By 3:15 p.m., assets from Virginia began rolling into D.C.

An hour later, at 4:17 p.m, a video of Trump was uploaded to Twitter in which he instructed "you have to go home now." Fifteen minutes later, Secretary Miller authorized the D.C. National Guard to actually deploy.

=== Wednesday, January 6, 2021 ===
==== Early morning (before 9:00 a.m.) ====
- 1:00 a.m.: Trump tweets: "If Vice President @Mike_Pence comes through for us, we will win the Presidency."
- 1:13 a.m.: Ali Alexander, Stop the Steal organizer, tweets "First official day of the rebellion."
- 3:23 a.m.: Ron Watkins, imageboard administrator and prominent QAnon figure, posts a tweet accusing Vice President Mike Pence of orchestrating a coup against Trump. He also linked to a blog post which called for "the immediate arrest of [Pence], for treason."
- 6 a.m. hour: Unidentified individuals construct a gallows outside the Capitol, leaving off crossbeam and noose.
- 6:29 a.m.: Stewart Rhodes reminds the Oath Keepers that blades over "3 inches" are illegal in the city. He tells them to "[k]eep [the knives] low profile."
- 7:25 a.m.: The National Park Service observes that people are hiding bags in trees to bypass inspection.
- 7:29 a.m.: Courtney Holland, who later became communications director for the Republican Senate nominee in Nevada, tweets that she is walking to the Stop the Steal rally with Scott Presler, Megan Barth, and Rose Tennent. Those three people are scheduled to speak later at a different rally at the Capitol.
- 7:30 a.m.: White House chief of staff Mark Meadows texts Representative Jim Jordan "I have pushed for this" but is "not sure it is going to happen," referring to Pence overturning the election results.
- 8:06 a.m.: Trump tweets a false allegation of election fraud.
- 8:07 a.m.: Secret Service countersurveillance agents reported that "members of the crowd are wearing ballistic helmets, body armor and carrying radio equipment and military grade backpacks."
- 8:17 a.m.: Trump tweets allegations of vote fraud and asks Pence to delay the electoral count:
  States want to correct their votes, which they now know were based on irregularities and fraud, plus corrupt process never received legislative approval. All Mike Pence has to do is send them back to the States, AND WE WIN. Do it Mike, this is a time for extreme courage!"
- 8:22 a.m.: Trump tweets a request for Republican party officials to delay the electoral count.

==== Rallies ====
===== 9:00 a.m. =====
- 9:00 a.m.: At start time on permit for First Amendment rally "March for Trump" speeches, the "Save America" rally (or "March to Save America") begins. Above the podium at The Ellipse are banners for "Save America March". Rep. Mo Brooks (R–AL) makes a speech about "kicking ass", asking "Will you fight for America?"
- 9:02 a.m.: Trump asks the switchboard operator to call Pence, who doesn't answer.
- 9:24 a.m.: Trump has an approximately 10-minute phone call with Representative Jim Jordan. (As of late 2023, Jordan has not said what the call was about.)
- 9:45 a.m.: A Federal Protective Service liaison officer informs the Capitol Police that more than the permitted 30,000 protesters are expected at the Ellipse, the Freedom Plaza permit was increased from 5,000 to 30,000, and the protest outside the Sylven Theater is permitted for 15,000. According to Newsweek, "Six times as many protestors—as many as 120,000—would show up on the Mall on January 6, according to classified numbers still not released by the Secret Service and the FBI but seen by Newsweek."
- 9:52 a.m.: Trump has a 26-minute phone call with speechwriter Stephen Miller about his planned speech for the Save America Rally later that day.

===== 10:00 a.m. =====
- 10:00 a.m.: Before this time, White House deputy chief of staff Tony Ornato informs Trump that authorities have spotted armed individuals at the crowd gathering at the Ellipse. Ornato explained to Trump that some of his supporters "have weapons that they don't want confiscated by the Secret Service" and thus they refused to pass through the magnetometers and had not drawn close to the Ellipse where Trump was scheduled to speak at 11 a.m.
- 10:15 a.m.: Around this time, Tony Ornato, along with Cassidy Hutchinson, who was an aide to Mark Meadows, inform Meadows about the armed Trump supporters.
- 10:30 a.m.: Benjamin Philips splits from his group to park, not reuniting but later dying from a stroke at George Washington University Hospital.
- 10:30 a.m.: 200–300 Proud Boys started their march down the National Mall towards the U.S. Capitol.
- 10:47 a.m.: Rudy Giuliani begins a speech in which he calls for "trial by combat".
- 10:58 a.m.: A Proud Boys contingent leaves the rally and marches toward the Capitol Building. (According to later testimony, a "couple of hundred" Proud Boys began walking east, "down the Mall...towards the Capitol" at approximately 10:30 a.m.)

===== 11:00 a.m. =====
- 11:00 a.m.: The Ellipse, located south of the White House, is filled with Trump supporters.
- 11:06 a.m.: "There is no official record of President Trump receiving or placing a call between 11:06 a.m. and 6:54 p.m.," Representative Elaine Luria stated at a public hearing a year later. (The start time of the absence has also been reported as 11:17 a.m.) However, still later, prosecutors said they had obtained data from a cell phone Trump was using on the day of the attack, including when he was using Twitter and what other websites he visited.
- 11:23 a.m.: According to the final report of the House committee: "Three men in fatigues from Broward County, Florida brandished AR-15s in front of MPD officers on 14th Street and Independence Avenue. MPD advised over the radio that one individual was possibly armed with a 'Glock' at Fourteenth Street and Constitution Avenue, and another was possibly armed with a 'rifle' at Fifteenth Street and Constitution Avenue around 11:23 a.m."
- 11:30 a.m.:
  - Acting Secretary of Defense Christopher C. Miller participates in a tabletop exercise on Department of Defense contingency response options for the D.C. protests.
  - The motorcade of Vice President-elect Kamala Harris arrives at DNC headquarters, passing through its garage. (Law enforcement will, at 1:07 p.m., discover a pipe bomb in this garage only several yards away from where her motorcade passed, they will evacuate Harris seven minutes later, and they will finish dismantling the bomb at 2:31 p.m.)
- 11:46 a.m.: Some Proud Boys, including Joe Biggs and Ethan Nordean, are gathered where Trump is about to speak.
- 11:50 a.m. (approximately): From backstage at the Ellipse, Trump could see that TV viewers would perceive the venue as not filled to capacity. That was because about half of his 53,000 supporters refused to be screened for weapons by passing through the magnetometers and thus had not entered the area. Trump yelled (as Cassidy Hutchinson would later testify): "I don't [fucking] care that they have weapons. They're not here to hurt me. Take the [fucking] mags away. Let my people in. They can march to the Capitol from here. Take the [fucking] mags away."
- 11:57 a.m.: President Trump begins his over one-hour speech. He repeats allegations that the election was stolen, criticizes Vice President Mike Pence by name a half-dozen times (though this wasn't part of his prepared remarks), accuses fellow Republicans of not doing enough to back up his allegations, and states that he will walk with the crowd to the Capitol.

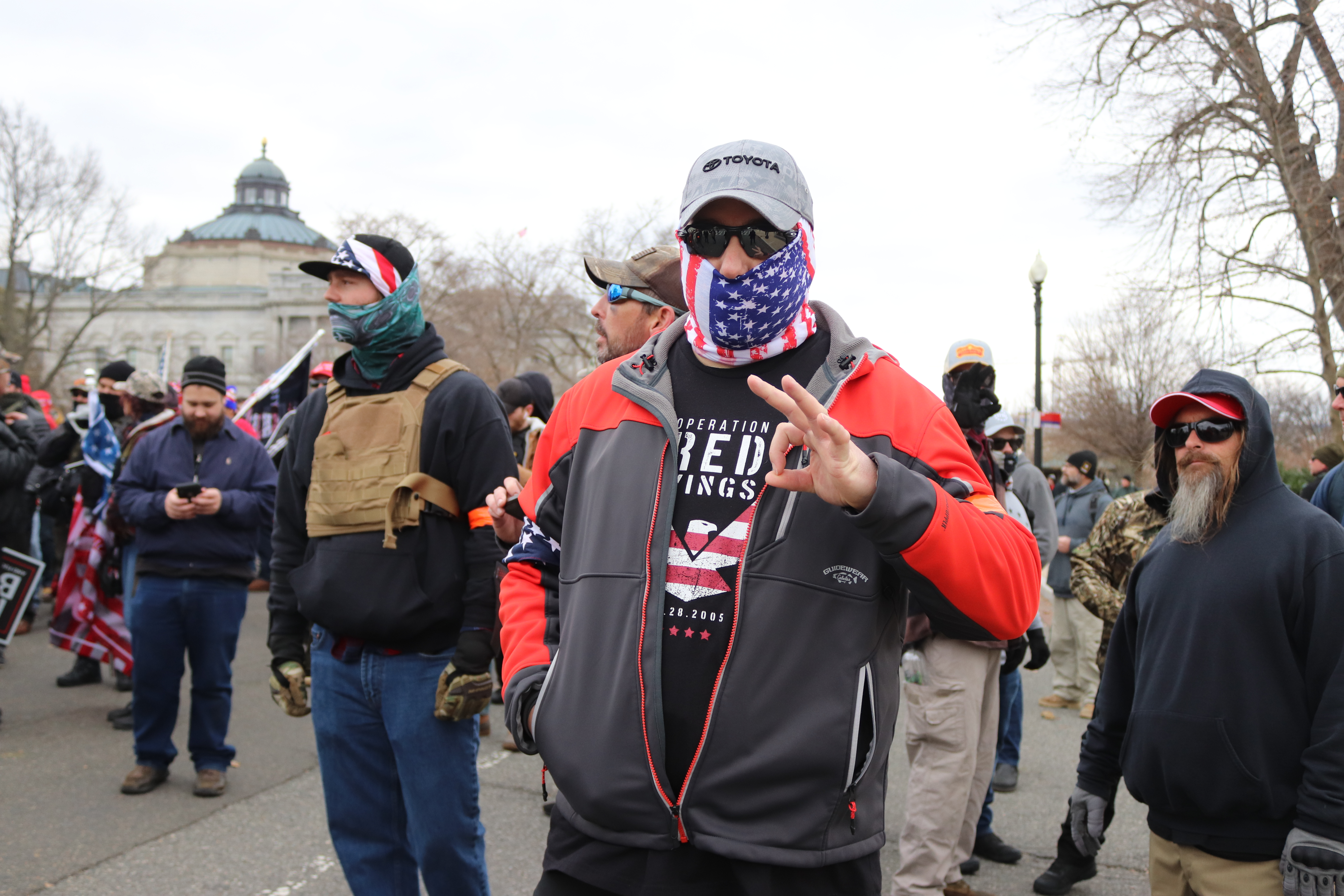
A member of a group of Proud Boys east of the Capitol makes the White power gesture at 11:54 a.m.

===== 12:00 p.m. =====
- 12:00 p.m.:
  - A Federal Protective Service briefing email reports that about 300 Proud Boys are at the Capitol, a man in a tree near the Ellipse is holding what looks like a rifle, and some of the 25,000 people around the White House are hiding bags in bushes. The email warns that the Proud Boys are threatening to shut down the downtown water system.
  - Between 12 and 1 p.m., the National Park Service detains someone with a rifle.
- 12:05 p.m.: Rep. Paul Gosar tweets a demand for Biden to concede by the next morning.
- 12:16 p.m. Trump tells the crowd: "I know that everyone here will soon be marching over to the Capitol building to peacefully and patriotically make your voices heard."
- 12:20 p.m.: A Federal Protective Service officer writes in an email, "POTUS is encouraging the protesters to march to capitol grounds and continue protesting there."
- 12:26 p.m.: Pence arrives at the Capitol.
- 12:28 p.m.: A Federal Protective Service officer reports 10,000–15,000 people moving towards the Capitol down Pennsylvania, Constitution, and Madison Avenues.

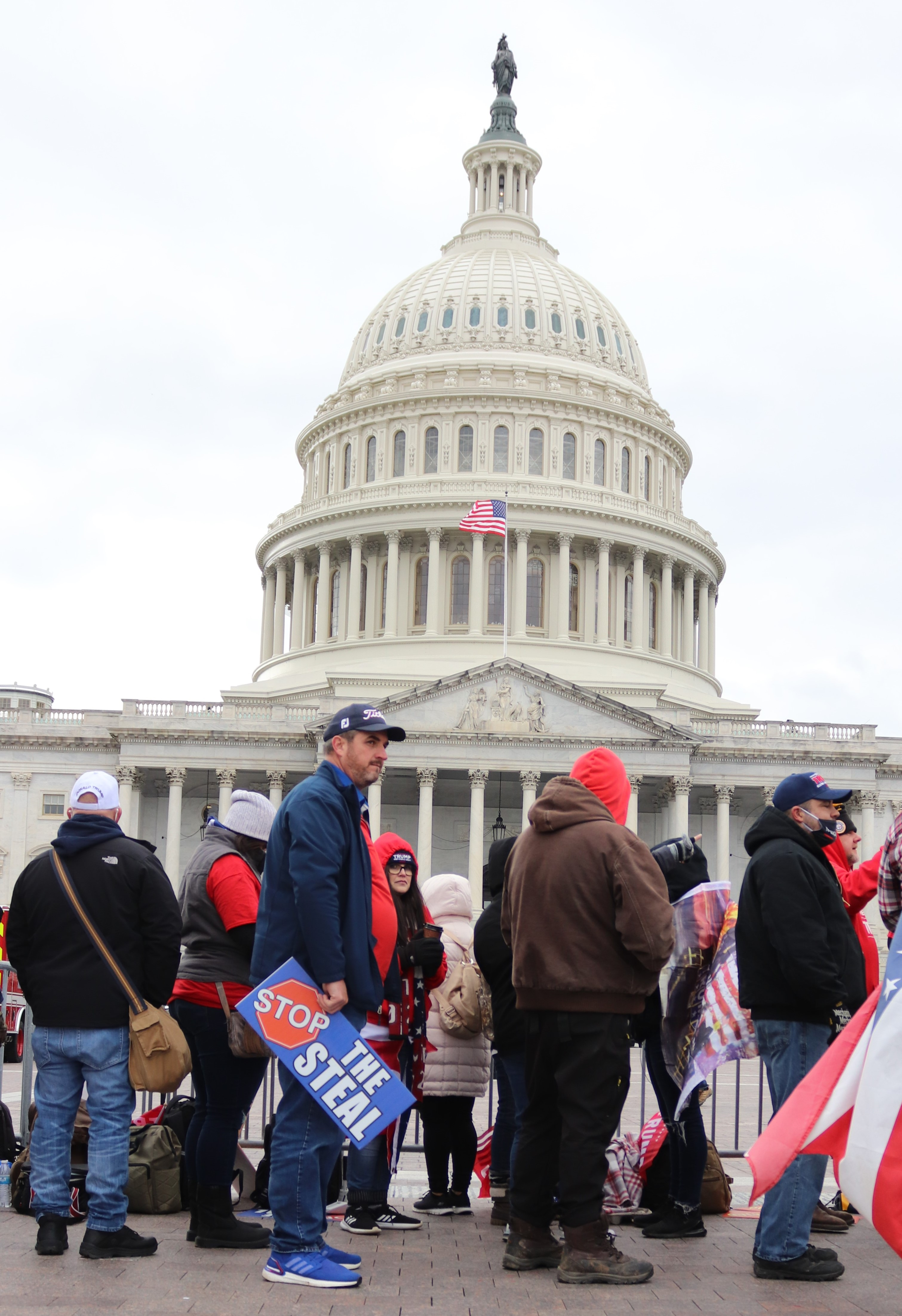
Pro-Trump supporters gathering outside the east plaza of the Capitol at 12:09 p.m.

- Shortly after 12:30 p.m.: Senator Ron Johnson's aide Sean Riley texts Pence aide Chris Hodgson, telling him that Johnson "needs to hand something to VPOTUS please advise." Hodgson asks: "What is it?" Riley says: "Alternate slates of electors for MI and WI because archivist didn't receive them." Hodgson replies: "Do not give that to him."
- 12:30 p.m.: Crowds of pro-Trump supporters gather outside the U.S. Capitol building.
- 12:45 p.m.:
  - FBI, Capitol Police, and ATF responded to the pipe bomb found outside RNC headquarters, which had been planted the night before.
  - Proud Boys arrive at the Peace Monument northwest of the Capitol.
- 12:49 p.m.:
  - Capitol Police respond to a report of a possible explosive device at the Republican National Committee Headquarters, which is later identified as a pipe bomb. A second pipe bomb at the headquarters of the Democratic National Committee would be found at 1:07 p.m. Buildings next to these headquarters are evacuated. Authorities later described the pipe bombs as "viable", but they never detonated.
  - A police sweep of the area identifies a vehicle which held one handgun, an M4 Carbine assault rifle with loaded magazine, and components for 11 Molotov cocktails with homemade napalm. Around 6:30 p.m, the driver was apprehended carrying two unregistered handguns as he returned to the vehicle. He is not suspected of planting the pipe bombs. As of 2024, it remains unknown who planted them.
  - Joe Biggs and Ethan Nordean, again, are caught on video in the crowd outside the Capitol.
- 12:52 p.m.: Some Oath Keepers, including Jessica Watkins, leave the Ellipse.
- 12:53 p.m.: Rioters overwhelm police along the outer perimeter west of the Capitol building, pushing aside temporary fencing. Notably, Ryan Samsel (convicted in 2024) "took off his jean jacket, flipped his 'Make America Great Again' hat backwards, and began ripping down the bike racks that were used to form a line of defense," as reported by NBC 5 Dallas-Fort Worth. This threw Capitol Police Officer Caroline Edwards backwards; she was briefly knocked unconscious. Some protesters immediately follow toward the Capitol, while others, at least initially, remain behind and admonish the others: "Don't do it. You're breaking the law."
- 12:57 p.m.: Federal Protective Service officers report that the Capitol Police barricade on the west side of the Capitol building has been breached by a large group. By 1:03 p.m., a vanguard of rioters have overrun three layers of barricades and have forced police officers to the base of the west Capitol steps.
- 12:58 p.m.: Chief Sund asks House Sergeant at Arms Paul D. Irving and Senate Sergeant at Arms Michael C. Stenger to declare an emergency and call for deployment of the National Guard. Irving and Stenger state that they will forward the request up their chains of command. Soon afterwards, aides to Congressional leaders arrive in Stenger's office and are outraged to learn that he has not yet called for any reinforcement. Phone records obtained at the Senate Hearings reflect that Sund first reached out to Irving to request the National Guard at 12:58 p.m. on the day of the attack. Sund then called the Senate sergeant-at-arms at the time, Michael Stenger, at 1:05 p.m. Sund repeated his request in a call at 1:28 p.m. and then again at 1:34 p.m., 1:39 p.m. and 1:45 p.m. that day. The Capitol Police Board consisting of the Architect of the Capitol, the House Sergeant at Arms, and the Senate Sergeant at Arms have the authority to request the national guard to the Capitol, but had made the decision three days earlier not to do so.

===== 1:00 p.m. =====
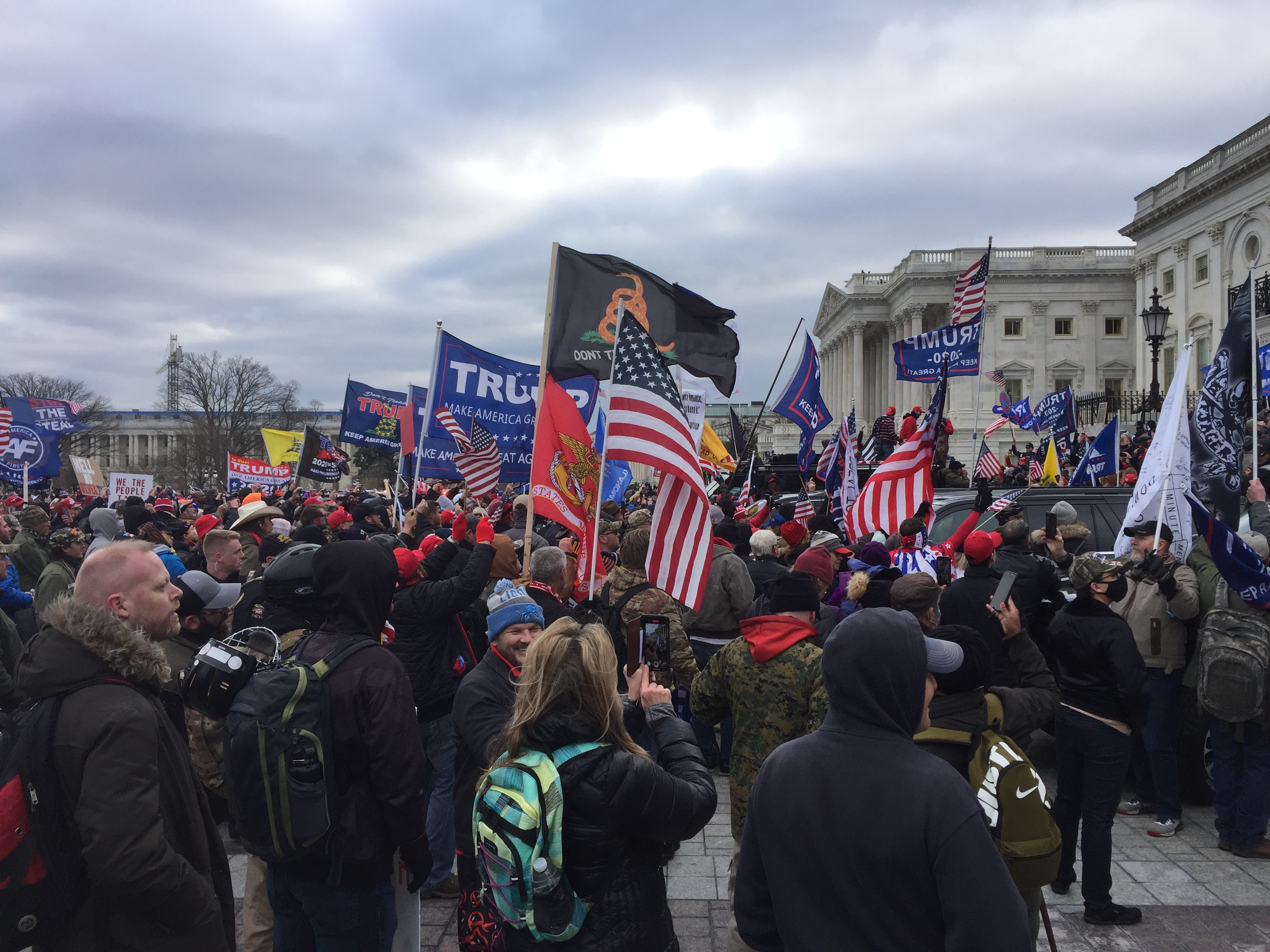
East side of the Capitol at 2:03 p.m.

- 1:00 p.m.:
  - Senators and Vice President Pence walk to the House chamber.
  - US Capitol Police Chief Steven Sund calls D.C. Metropolitan Police Chief Contee, who deploys 100 officers to the Capitol complex, the earliest arriving within 10 minutes.
- 1:02 p.m.: Pence refuses to go along with Trump's plan to pick and choose electors, and tweets a letter stating in part,
  It is my considered judgment that my oath to support and defend the Constitution constrains me from claiming unilateral authority to determine which electoral votes should be counted and which should not.
  Pence had not shown it to the White House Counsel in advance.
- 1:05 p.m.:
  - Congress meets in joint session to confirm Joe Biden's electoral victory.
  - Acting Secretary of Defense Miller receives open-source intelligence reports of demonstrators moving towards the U.S. Capitol.
- 1:07 p.m.: Authorities respond to the headquarters of the Democratic National Committee, following discovery of the second pipe bomb. When police arrive, Vice President-elect Kamala Harris is inside. She has been in the building for over an hour and a half and must now be evacuated.
- 1:10 p.m.: Trump ends his speech by urging his supporters to march upon the Capitol Building:
  If you don't fight like hell, you're not going to have a country anymore....We're going to try and give them [Republicans] the kind of pride and boldness that they need to take back our country...The Democrats are hopeless—they never vote for anything. Not even one vote. But we're going to try and give our Republicans, the weak ones because the strong ones don't need any of our help. We're going to try and give them the kind of pride and boldness that they need to take back our country.
- 1:11 p.m.: First MPD officers arrive at lower west plaza to confront rioters approaching the Capitol
- 1:12 p.m.: Rep. Paul Gosar (R–AZ) and Sen. Ted Cruz (R–TX) object to certifying the votes made in the 2020 United States presidential election in Arizona. The joint session separates into House and Senate chambers to debate the objection.
- 1:14 p.m.: Due to the pipe bomb (see 1:07 p.m.), Vice President-elect Harris is evacuated from DNC Headquarters.
- 1:17 p.m.: Trump's motorcade leaves the Ellipse. As Trump later recalled for journalist Jonathan Karl: "I was going to [go to the Capitol] and then the Secret Service said, 'You can't.'" The Secret Service drives him back to the White House against his wishes. Upon being denied transportation to the Capitol, Trump behaved angrily, according to multiple witnesses who testified for the House committee. However, according to the driver (in his testimony nearly two years later), Trump "never grabbed the steering wheel. I didn't see him, you know, lunge to try to get into the front seat at all."
- 1:19 p.m.: Trump's motorcade arrives at the White House.
- 1:21 p.m.:
  - Trump enters the White House.
  - "The Presidential Daily Diary...contains no information for the period between 1:21 p.m. and 4:03 p.m.," Rep. Elaine Luria stated at a public hearing a year later. "The chief White House photographer wanted to take pictures because it was, in her words, 'very important for his archives and for history.' But she was told, 'no photographs.'"

==== Trump watches TV (1:25–4:03 p.m.) ====
A White House employee breaks the news to Trump that a TV network did not broadcast the entirety of his speech in favor of footage of the Capitol riot. When the employee tells him (roughly) "they're rioting down there at the Capitol," Trump says (roughly) "Oh, really?" and asks to see it on TV. As they walk to the Oval Dining Room, the employee takes off Trump's "outer coat," brings the TV into the dining room, rewinds it to the beginning of Trump's speech rather than the live coverage, and hands Trump the remote. The employee leaves briefly and returns with a Diet Coke, at which time Trump is still watching the TV coverage. (As told by the White House employee when interviewed by the January 6 House select committee.)

According to the final report of the January 6 House select committee:

"Here's what President Trump did during the 187 minutes between the end of his speech and when he finally told rioters to go home: For hours, he watched the attack from his TV screen. His channel of choice was Fox News. He issued a few tweets, some on his own inclination and some only at the repeated behest of his daughter and other trusted advisors. He made several phone calls, some to his personal lawyer Rudolph Giuliani, some to Members of Congress about continuing their objections to the electoral certification, even though the attack was well underway. Here's what President Trump did not do: He did not call any relevant law enforcement agency to ensure they were working to quell the violence. He did not call the Secretary of Defense; he did not call the Attorney General; he did not call the Secretary of Homeland Security. And for hours on end, he refused the repeated requests—from nearly everyone who talked to him—to simply tell the mob to go home."

Trump's aides confirmed that he watched the television coverage, but Trump himself has refused to admit doing so. Two months after the attack on the Capitol, he told journalist Jonathan Karl: "When I get back [to the White House], I saw—I wanted to go back [to the Capitol]. I was thinking about going back during the problem to stop the problem, doing it myself. Secret Service didn't like that idea too much."

- 1:25 p.m.:
  - Trump enters the Oval Office private dining room and stays there, watching Fox News, until after 4 p.m. (Three months later, Trump acknowledged to a journalist that the Capitol police "did lose control" of the mob, but he claimed he did not hear of the attack while in meetings with his chief of staff and instead learned of it "afterwards, and ... on the late side" upon turning on the television.)
  - White House press secretary Stephanie Grisham texts First Lady Melania Trump: "Do you want to tweet that peaceful protests are the right of every American, but there is no place for lawlessness and violence?" She immediately responds: "No". (Melania Trump didn't tweet at all on the day of the attack, and did not tweet to condemn the violence until five days later.)
- 1:26 p.m.: U.S. Capitol Police order evacuation of at least two buildings in the Capitol complex, including the Cannon House Office Building and the Madison Building of the Library of Congress.
- 1:30 p.m.:
  - Capitol Police are overwhelmed and retreat up the steps of the Capitol. Lawmakers see the police in the halls.
  - Large numbers of Trump supporters march from the Ellipse 1.5 miles down Pennsylvania Avenue toward the Capitol. Lawmakers watch their approach on online videos.
- 1:34 p.m.: D.C. Mayor Muriel Bowser requests via phone that Army Secretary Ryan D. McCarthy provide an unspecified number of additional forces.
- 1:35 p.m.: In Senate deliberations, Senate Majority Leader Mitch McConnell (R–KY) warns that refusing to certify the election results under false pretenses would push American democracy into a "death spiral".
- 1:39 p.m.: The White House switchboard connects with Rudy Giuliani for 3 minutes and 53 seconds.
- 1:49 p.m.:
  - Capitol Police Chief Sund requests immediate assistance from District of Columbia National Guard (DCNG) Commander Major General William J. Walker. Major General Walker loads guardsmen onto buses in anticipation of receiving permission from the Secretary of the Army to deploy.
  - Trump tweets a video replay of the Ellipse rally where he'd wrapped up his speech a half-hour earlier.
- 1:50 p.m.:
  - D.C. Metropolitan Police on-scene incident commander Robert Glover declares a riot.
  - Economist E.J. Antoni walked through the crowd in a restricted area on the west side of the Capitol. He was never charged with a crime. In August 2025, Trump (then president again) nominated him to lead the Bureau of Labor Statistics.
- 1:51 p.m.:
  - Trump supporter Alex Jones speaks from a bullhorn to the crowd on west side exhorting them to remain peaceful and to "not fight the police". He directs them to "the other [East] side" where he claims they have a permit and a stage.
  - Radio talk show host and former FEMA director Michael D. Brown tweets the baseless claim that the people breaching Capitol security are likely antifa, Black Lives Matter protestors, or other insurgents disguised as Trump supporters, and suggests the attack could be a psychological warfare operation.
- 1:54 p.m.: Todd Herman, guest hosting The Rush Limbaugh Show, informs his large national radio audience of Brown's claim that the people breaching security are not Trump supporters.
- 1:55 p.m.: Secret Service notified they are not going to the Capitol, after holding the motorcade at the White House for possibly doing so.
- 1:58 p.m.: Along the east side of the Capitol, a much smaller police presence retreats from a different mob, removing a barrier along the northeast corner of the building. Oath Keepers Kenneth Harrelson (later charged with sedition) and Jason Dolan had arrived at the east side of the Capitol "shortly before 2 p.m."
- 1:59 p.m.: Chief Sund receives the first reports that rioters had reached the Capitol's doors and windows and were trying to break in.
- 1 p.m. hour: Crossbar and noose added to gallows.

===== 2:00 p.m. =====
C-SPAN broadcast of the Senate going into recess after rioters infiltrate the Capitol

- 2:00 p.m.:
  - The mob removes the last barrier protecting the east side of the Capitol.
  - Alex Jones, rounding the north side of the Capitol, moves from the west side to the east side.
- 2:03 p.m.: The White House switchboard connects with Rudy Giuliani for 8 minutes.
- 2:05 p.m.: Kevin Greeson is declared dead after suffering a heart attack outdoors on the Capitol grounds.
- 2:06 p.m. Rioters breach the new police line on the east side of the Capitol and go upstairs to the Columbus Doors, aka Rotunda Doors. Jones's camera crew negotiates with USCP officers.
- 2:10 p.m.:
  - The mob west of the Capitol chase police up the steps, breaching the final barricade and approach an entrance directly below the Senate chamber.
  - House Sergeant at Arms Irving calls Chief Sund with formal approval to request assistance from the National Guard.

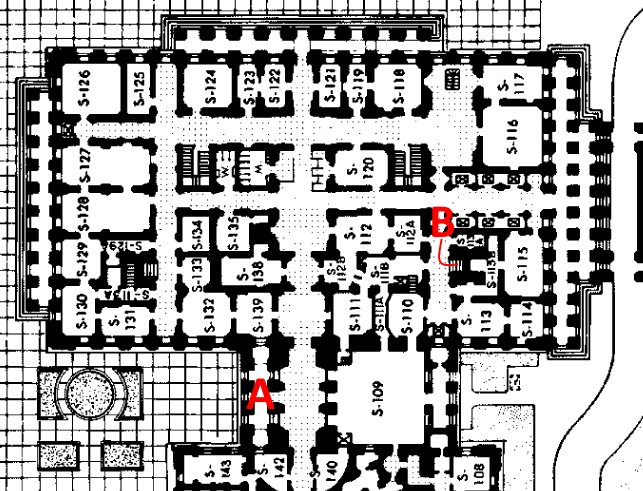
Floorplan of the first floor of the Senate side of the Capitol. "A" indicates the location of the first breach into the building at 2:11 p.m. "B" indicates the location of a Capitol Police officer in a doorway before retreating up stairs at 2:14 p.m.

- 2:11 p.m.: Rioter Dominic Pezzola, using a stolen plastic police riot shield, breaks a window on the northwest side of the Capitol in the Senate wing of the building.
- 2:12 p.m.:
  - Michael Sparks, wearing a tactical vest, climbs through the window Pezzola broke (though other rioters yell at him not to do so), becoming the first rioter to enter the Capitol. A police officer pepper sprays him in the face, but this does not stop him. Once inside, Sparks opens a door for others.
  - Police begin dismantling a pipe bomb outside DNC headquarters.
- 2:13 p.m.:
  - Entries in a National Security Council chat convey that "2 windows have been kicked in" and "Capitol is breached".
  - Vice President Pence is removed from the Senate chamber by his lead Secret Service agent, Tim Giebels, who brings him to a nearby office about 100 feet from the landing.
  - The Senate is gaveled into recess.
- 2:14 p.m.:
  - Sparks and other rioters chase a lone Capitol Police officer, Eugene Goodman, up northwest stairs, where there are doors to the Senate chamber in both directions, as police inside the chamber attempt to lock doors. The mob gets within 40 feet of Vice President Pence's hiding place (to which he escaped one minute earlier) but does not catch sight of him. Officer Goodman leads the mob to backup in front of a set of Senate doors while senators inside attempt to evacuate.
  - Proud Boy Joe Biggs enters the Capitol building.
  - Representative Gosar speaks to the House against certifying Arizona's electoral votes.
  - Federal Protective Service officers report that the Capitol has been breached.
- 2:15 p.m.: Rioters use a hammer to break and open a door.
- 2:16 p.m.: Federal Protective Service officers report that the House and Senate are being locked down.
- 2:18 p.m.:
  - An official warns in a National Security Council chat that "VP may be stuck at the Capitol" if security doesn't reach a decision to move him within 2–3 minutes.
  - Speaker of the House Nancy Pelosi (D–CA) is removed from the chamber by her protective detail. Representative Gosar continues addressing the House, despite the confusion, while ranking member Jim McGovern (D-CA) steps in as Speaker.
  - The House recesses.
- 2:20 p.m.: The National Security Council chat reports the breach of "Second Floor" and "Senate Door".
- 2:22 p.m.: Army Secretary McCarthy has a phone call with Mayor Bowser, D.C. Deputy Mayor John Falcicchio, Director of the D.C. Homeland Security and Emergency Management Agency Christopher Rodriguez, and leadership of the Metropolitan Police in which additional DCNG support is requested.
- 2:23 p.m.:
  - Rioters attempt to breach the police line formed by barricades of bicycle racks. As a police lieutenant sprays the crowd with a chemical substance, rioter Julian Elie Khater raises his arm above the mob and sprays a chemical substance toward United States Capitol Police officer Brian Sicknick, who dies the following day from a stroke.
  - A conversation over Washington's Metropolitan Police Department radio: "We're starting to get surrounded. They're taking the North Front scaffolding", someone says. Another voice on the radio warns: "Unless we're getting more munitions, we're not going to be able to hold." A reply: "A door has been breached, and people are gaining access into the Capitol."
  - Nancy Pelosi walks through the complex, speaking on a phone. She says that if Congress can't "finish the proceedings", the insurrectionists "will have had a complete victory."
- 2:24 p.m.:
  - Entries in a National Security Council chat convey that there are "explosions on the rotunda steps" and "Service at the capitol does not sound good right now". The official who wrote this, when later interviewed by the January 6 House committee, explained the second comment: "The members of the VP detail at this time were starting to fear for their own lives...we came very close to either Service having to use lethal options or worse....they're screaming and saying things like 'say goodbye to the family'." (The committee did not reveal the official's name.)
  - Cassidy Hutchinson overhears Trump repeatedly use the word "hang" in a conversation with Mark Meadows prior to his tweet about Pence.
  - President Trump tweets "Mike Pence didn't have the courage to do what should have been done to protect our Country and our Constitution, giving States a chance to certify a corrected set of facts, not the fraudulent or inaccurate ones which they were asked to previously certify. USA demands the truth!" When Twitter reinstated Trump's account in November 2022, this tweet was gone. The U.S. House select committee investigating January 6 wrote that this tweet "inflamed and exacerbated the mob violence"; this assessment was part of the committee's criminal referral of Trump for insurrection. Similarly, the committee wrote in its final report: "Immediately after this tweet, the crowds both inside and outside of the Capitol building violently surged forward. Outside the building, within ten minutes thousands of rioters overran the line on the west side of the Capitol that was being held by the Metropolitan Police Force's Civil Disturbance Unit, the first time in history of the DC Metro Police that such a security line had ever been broken." Within an hour after this tweet, Pat Cipollone complained to Mark Meadows that "we need to do something more. They're literally calling for the Vice President to be [fucking] hung." Meadows suggested that there was nothing to do, given that Trump "thinks Mike deserves it." At some point, Nick Luna, an aide, comes into the dining room and informs Trump that Pence has been moved for his safety. Luna later tells the House select committee that he did not recall how Trump responded, and he tells federal investigators that Trump responded: "So what?"
- 2:25 p.m.:
  - Army Secretary McCarthy ordered staff to prepare movement of the emergency reaction force, which could be ready in 20 minutes, to the Capitol.
  - Over the next three minutes, "rioters breached the East Rotunda doors, other rioters breached the police line in the Capitol Crypt, Vice President Pence had to be evacuated from his Senate office, and Rep. McCarthy was evacuated from his Capitol office", according to the U.S. House select committee on January 6 in the introduction to its final report.

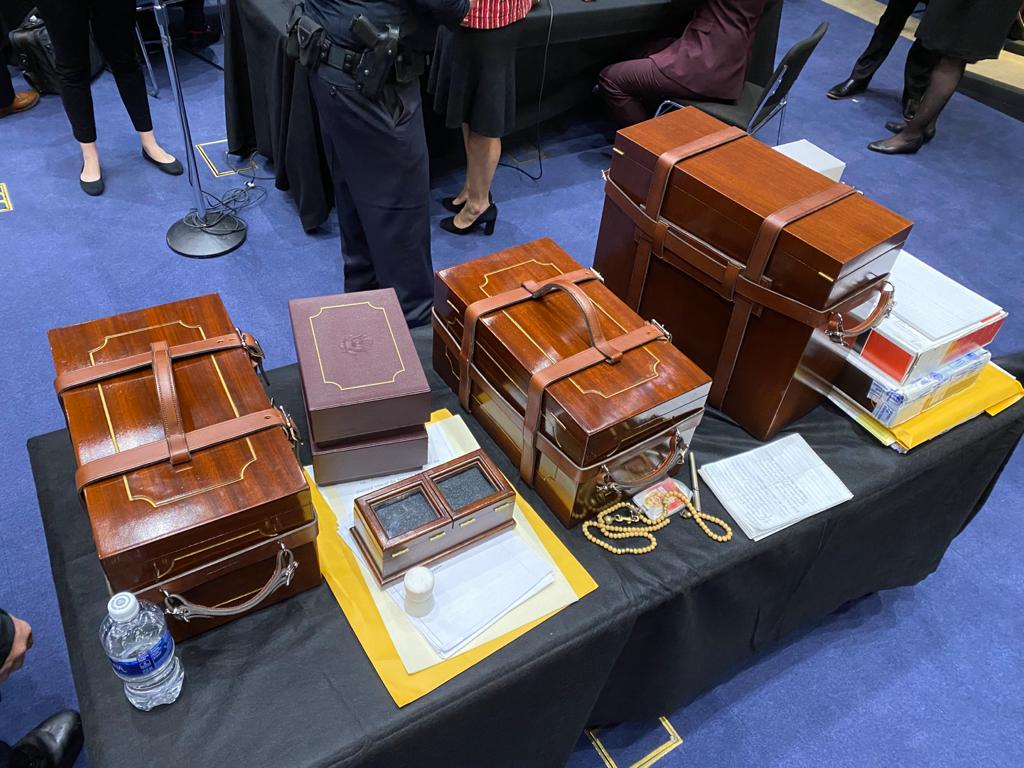
Ceremonial boxes containing the states' Electoral College certificates after being removed from the Senate chamber by Congressional staffers

- 2:26 p.m.: D.C.'s homeland security director Chris Rodriquez coordinates a conference call with Mayor Bowser, the chiefs of the Capitol Police (Sund) and Metropolitan Police (Contee), and DCNG Maj. Gen. Walker. As the DCNG does not report to a governor, but to the President, Maj. Gen. Walker patched in the Office of the Secretary of the Army, noting that he would need Pentagon authorization to deploy. Lt. Gen. Walter E. Piatt, director of the Army Staff, noted that the Pentagon needed Capitol Police authorization to step onto Capitol grounds. Sund began describing the breach by rioters but the call became unintelligible as multiple people began asking questions at the same time. Metro Police Chief Robert Contee asked for clarification from Capitol Police Chief Sund: "Steve, are you requesting National Guard assistance at the Capitol?" to which Chief Sund replied, "I am making urgent, urgent, immediate request for National Guard assistance." According to Sund, Lt. Gen. Piatt said, "I don't like the visual of the National Guard standing a police line with the Capitol in the background", and that he prefer that the Guard relieve police posts around D.C. to allow police to deploy to the Capitol. Sund pleaded with Lt. Gen. Piatt to send the Guard, but Lt. Gen. Piatt said only Army Secretary McCarthy had the authority to approve such a request and he could not recommend that Secretary McCarthy approve the request for assistance directly to the Capitol. The D.C. officials were subsequently described as "flabbergasted" at this message. McCarthy would later state that he was not in this conference call because he was already entering a meeting with senior Department leadership. Piatt contests this description of the call, denying that he talked about visuals and stating that he stayed on the conference call while senior Defense Department officials were meeting. The Army falsely denied for two weeks that Lt. Gen. Charles A. Flynn—the Army deputy chief of staff for operations, plans and training—was in this call. His brother Michael Flynn, a retired Trump National Security Advisor, had pledged an oath to the QAnon conspiracy theory, though there are no indications that Lt. Gen. Flynn shares his brother's beliefs.
- 2:26 p.m.:
  - Trump calls Senator Mike Lee (R–UT), having misdialed Senator Tommy Tuberville (R–AL). Lee passes his phone to Tuberville, who informs Trump that Pence had just been evacuated from the Senate chamber. "I said 'Mr President, they've taken the Vice President out. They want me to get off the phone, I gotta go'," he recounted to reporters of his call.
  - After receipt of a call from D.C. Mayor Muriel E. Bowser indicating that DoD had refused to send assistance to the U.S. Capitol, the Public Safety Secretary of Virginia, Brian Moran, dispatches the Virginia State Police to the Capitol as permitted by mutual aid agreement with D.C.
  - Nancy Pelosi's motorcade, heading to Fort McNair, comes within a few hundred feet of the pipe bomb outside DNC headquarters while police are still dismantling it.
  - Security video shows Secret Service moving the Vice President and his family to a new secure location.
  - The House is briefly called back into session.
- 2:28 p.m.:
  - One of Nancy Pelosi's staffers whispered: "They're with...we need Capitol Police, I think—come into the hallway. They're pounding on doors trying to find her."
  - Capitol Police Chief Steven Sund reiterates his request for National Guard support to help shore up the perimeter of the Capitol.
- 2:29 p.m.: The House goes into recess again.
- 2:30 p.m.:
  - Secretary Miller, Chairman of the Joint Chiefs of Staff Gen. Mark Milley, and Army Secretary McCarthy meet to discuss Capitol Police and D.C. government requests.
  - Shortly before this time, The Washington Times publishes a story by Rowan Scarborough falsely claiming facial recognition company XRVision identified antifa members among the crowd at the Capitol. The Times corrects the story the next day after BuzzFeed News reports that XRVision threatened the Times with legal action over the story. Before the correction, the story amasses 360,000 shares and likes on Facebook.
- 2:31 p.m. Police finish dismantling the pipe bomb outside DNC headquarters.
- 2:32 p.m. Fox News anchor Laura Ingraham tweets Chief of Staff Meadows: "Hey Mark, The president needs to tell people in the Capitol to go home."
- 2:38 p.m.: President Trump tweets
  Please support our Capitol Police and Law Enforcement. They are truly on the side of our Country. Stay peaceful!

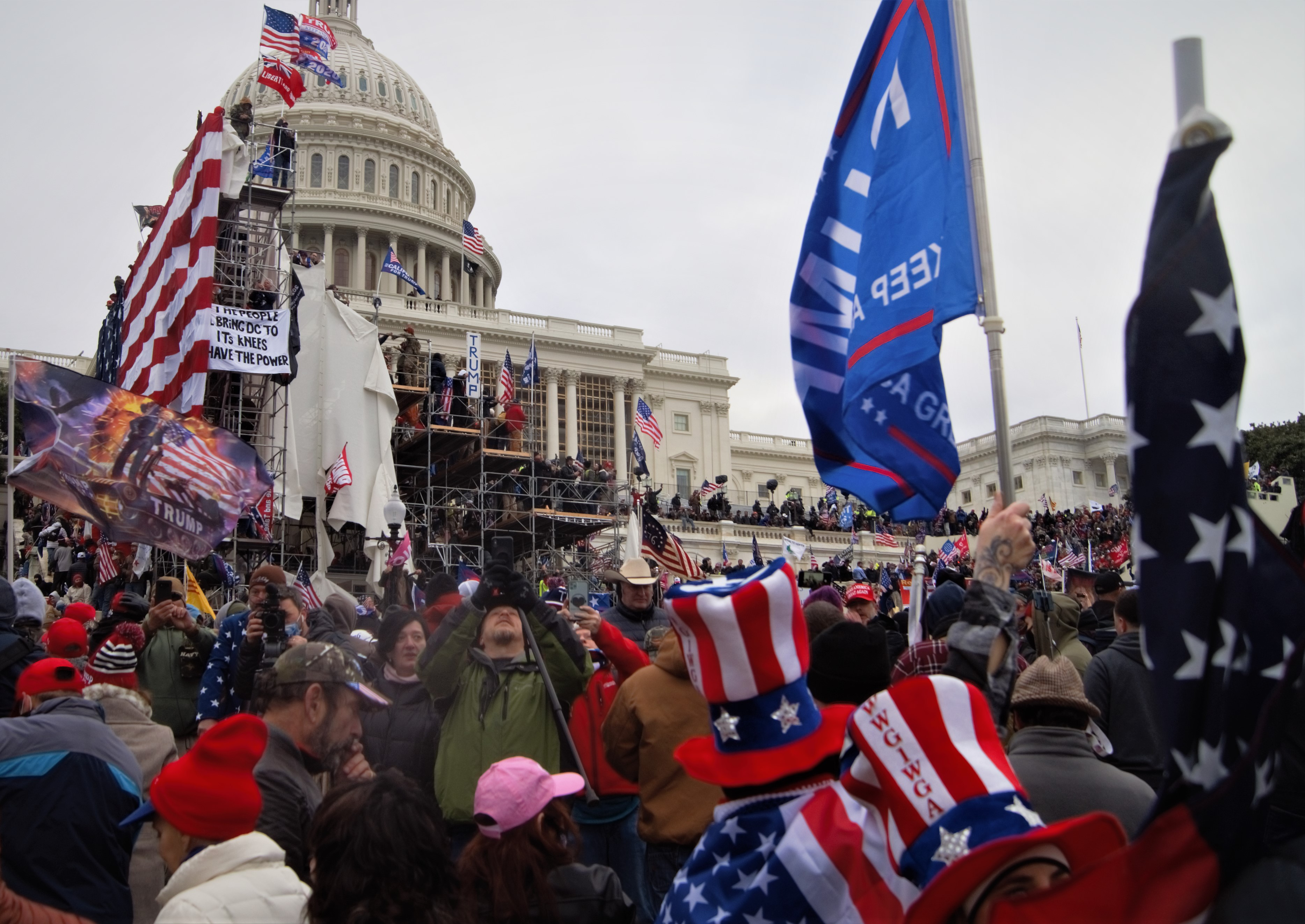
West steps of the Capitol at 2:46 p.m.

- 2:41 p.m.: Tristan Chandler Stevens, Patrick McCaughey III, and David Mehaffie, having scaled the Southwest scaffolding and staircase several minutes earlier, fight alongside the mob at the Lower West Terrace. They try until 3:19 p.m. to enter the building. (They later stood trial together and were each convicted and sentenced to prison.)
- 2:42 p.m.:
  - Rioters carrying flags walk down the hallways, kicking at office doors, chanting "Defend the Constitution! Defend your liberty!" and "1776!"
  - The Senate Chamber is breached by rioters.
  - By this time, Senator Chuck Schumer is in "a secure location", and the Senate is locked down.
  - In a "secure undisclosed location"—a small auditorium with about 50 chairs—Pelosi stands at the front of the room and asks how to maintain the impression of "some security or some confidence that government can function and that you can elect the President of the United States. Did we go back into session?" Someone replies: "We did go back into session, but now apparently everybody on the floor is putting on tear gas masks to prepare for a breach." Pelosi, seeming not to have understood a key phrase, asks the person to repeat it. The person reiterates: "Tear gas masks." Pelosi turns and says to someone else: "Do you believe this?"
  - Capitol Police radio: "We need an area for the House members. They're all walking over now through the tunnels."
- 2:44 p.m.:
  - Rioter Ashli Babbitt is shot by Capitol Police while attempting to force entry into the Speaker's Lobby adjacent to the House chambers by climbing through a window that led to the House floor.
  - At approximately the same time as Babbitt is shot, Representatives Markwayne Mullin and Troy Nehls are in the House chamber. The politicians, together with an armed officer, look through a door with a broken glass window and speak to rioters. One of those rioters, Damon Beckley, records video. (Beckley is later convicted, and his video is made public on the third anniversary of the attack.)
- 2:45 p.m.:
  - Federal Protective Service officers report, "Shots fired 2nd floor house side inside the capitol."
  - Jessica Watkins, later acquitted of seditious conspiracy, and Donovan Crowl, later convicted of conspiracy, enter the Capitol building.
  - Shortly after this time, some people break into Nancy Pelosi's office and scrawl a message for her: "WE WILL NOT BACK DOWN".
- 2:47 p.m.: A large group of people presses against an outer door. One says: "Here we go. Here's the next rush! There's a push inside, with resistance!"
- 2:49 p.m.:
  - After discussion with his chief of staff, Clark Mercer, the Governor of Virginia, Ralph Northam, activates all available assets of the State of Virginia including the Virginia National Guard to aid the US Capitol. Authorization from DoD required for legal deployment of Virginia National Guard in D.C. was not granted.
  - Trump aide Robert Gabriel texts: "Potus im sure is loving this."
- 2:53 p.m. Donald Trump Jr. tweets to Meadows: "He's got to condem [sic] this shit. Asap.The captiol [sic] police tweet is not enough. "
- 2:57 p.m.: A rioter, inches away from a Metropolitan police officer, yells: "Bring her out. Bring her out here. We're coming in if you don't bring her out." (This video was presented by prosecutors during the public hearings of the United States House Select Committee on the January 6 Attack)

===== 3:00 p.m. =====
- 3:00 p.m.: Chuck Schumer, seated with Nancy Pelosi, tells her: "I'm gonna call up the effin' Secretary of DoD." Then, speaking on the phone to Christopher Miller, acting Secretary of Defense, he says: "We have some Senators who are still in their hideaways. They need massive personnel now. Can you get the Maryland National Guard to come too?" Nancy Pelosi then speaks into Schumer's phone, telling Miller she plans to call the DC mayor to learn what other backup may have already been called. (She credits House Majority Leader Steny Hoyer, standing behind her, for that advice.)
- 3:04 p.m.: Secretary Miller, with advice from senior Defense leadership, formally approves "activation" of the 1,100 soldiers in the DCNG. Army Secretary McCarthy orders the DCNG to begin full "mobilization". (However, it will be another hour and a half before Miller approves an "operational plan" for the DCNG's deployment to the Capitol.)

Video posted by Senator Bill Cassidy (R–LA) to Twitter at 3:10 p.m.

- 3:05 p.m.: House Minority Leader Kevin McCarthy (R–CA) started a phone-in interview on live TV with WUSA. McCarthy said he had called the president to urge him to "calm people down" and in reply the president had sent out a tweet. Months later, McCarthy would claim to police that, based on his phone call with Trump, it wasn't obvious to him that Trump was aware of the violence inside the Capitol at the time.
- 3:08 p.m: Anton Lunyk, Francis Connor, Antonio Ferrigno—three friends who traveled from Brooklyn—enter the Capitol through the Senate Wing Door. They enter Senator Jeff Merkley's office. (Though they have no known ties to the White House, someone at the White House will call Lunyk an hour later.)
- 3:09 p.m.: A rioter walks through the halls, singing: "Nancy Pelosi! Where you at, Nancy? Nancy! Where are you, Nancy? We're looking for you!" (Someone responds: "She's in jail!") The rioter resumes: "Nancy, oh Nancy! Nancy! Nancy! Where are you, Nancy? We're looking for you, Nancy!" (This video was presented by prosecutors at the second impeachment trial of Donald Trump.)
- 3:09 p.m. former White House Chief of Staff Reince Priebus to current CoS Meadows: "TELL THEM TO GO HOME !!!"
- 3:10 p.m.: Fairfax County, Virginia, deputy county executive Dave Rohrer informs county officials that county police are being dispatched to assist Capitol Police in response to a mutual aid request.
- 3:12 p.m. Lunyk, Connor, and Ferrigno walk through the Capitol crypt and exit by climbing out a window.
- 3:13 p.m.: President Trump tweets: "I am asking for everyone at the U.S. Capitol to remain peaceful. No violence! Remember, WE are the Party of Law & Order – respect the Law and our great men and women in Blue. Thank you!"
- 3:15 p.m.:
  - House Speaker Pelosi calls the Governor of Virginia. The Governor of Virginia, Ralph Northam, confirms to House Speaker Pelosi that all assets of the State of Virginia including the National Guard are being sent to aid the U.S. Capitol.
  - First assets from Virginia begin rolling into D.C.
- 3:19 p.m.: Army Secretary McCarthy has a phone call with Senator Schumer and House Speaker Pelosi about Mayor Bowser's request. McCarthy explains that a full DCNG mobilization has been approved.
- 3:21 p.m.: Albuquerque Cosper Head pulls Officer Michael Fanone into the crowd, where Daniel Rodriguez tases Fanone in the neck. (In 2022, Head and Rodriguez are sentenced to prison for this.) Fanone is carried unconscious back into the tunnel.
- 3:22 p.m.:
  - Nancy Pelosi calls Virginia Governor Ralph Northam and asks if he's discussed sending the Virginia National Guard, noting that Steny Hoyer has already spoken to Maryland's Governor Larry Hogan and that Northam may need federal approval to send troops to "another jurisdiction". When the call ends, someone in the room tells Pelosi that the Virginia National Guard has been called in, and Pelosi confirms that Northam just told her "they sent 200 of state police and a unit of the National Guard."
  - Rohrer informs Fairfax County officials that the county is suspending fire, rescue, or emergency transportation to D.C. hospitals and "upgrading response and command structure."
- 3:25 p.m.: Pelosi and Schumer sit together holding a phone and speak to acting attorney general Jeffrey Rosen. Pelosi acknowledges that rioters are "ransacking our offices" but says she is primarily concerned about "personal harm." Schumer suggests that Rosen, "in your law enforcement responsibility," persuade Trump to make a "public statement" to tell his supporters "to leave the Capitol."
- 3:26 p.m.: McCarthy has a phone call with Mayor Bowser and Metro Police Chief Contee conveying that their request was not denied and that Secretary Miller has approved full activation of the DCNG.
- 3:32 p.m.: Virginia Governor Ralph Northam orders mobilization of Virginia National Guard forces in anticipation of a request for support according to Secretary of Defense timeline. Note inconsistency with statements of Virginia Governor. Statements of Virginia Governor indicate: 1) he authorized all forces under his command to help Capitol before DoD, and 2) DoD only followed after dissemination of his mobilization.
- 3:36 p.m.: White House press secretary Kayleigh McEnany tweets that National Guard and other Federal forces are headed to the Capitol.
- 3:37 p.m.: Maryland Governor Larry Hogan orders mobilization of Maryland National Guard forces in anticipation of a request for support.
- 3:39 p.m.: Arlington County, Virginia, acting police chief Andy Penn informs county officials that Arlington officers are responding to the attack and have been absorbed into the Capitol Police response.
- 3:39 p.m.: Senator Schumer implores Pentagon officials, "Tell POTUS to tweet everyone should leave." House Majority Leader Steny Hoyer, D–MD, wondered about calling up active duty military.
- 3:46 p.m.:
  - Leaders from both parties, including Steny Hoyer and Republican leaders Mitch McConnell, Steve Scalise, and John Thune, huddle around a single phone, appealing to the Department of Defense to send troops with a sense of urgency. The person on the other end says they cannot give a timeline for when the Capitol will be secured.
  - Chief of the National Guard Bureau Gen. Daniel R. Hokanson has a phone call with Virginia Adjutant General Timothy P. Williams to discuss support to Washington, D.C., and is informed that Virginia National Guard forces have already been mobilized.
- 3:48 p.m.: Army Secretary McCarthy leaves the Pentagon for Metro Police Department Headquarters in the Henry Daly Building.
- 3:55 p.m.: Gen. Hokanson has a phone call with Maryland Adjutant General Maj. Gen. Timothy E. Gowen to discuss support to Washington, D.C., and is informed that Maryland National Guard forces have already been mobilized.

===== 4:00 p.m. =====
- 4:03 p.m.: On the suggestion of Mark Meadows, Trump goes outside to the Rose Garden so his staff can make a video of him calling for an end to the violence. He refuses the script they give him and performs three unscripted takes of a short speech, which his aides record (rather than broadcast live).
- 4:05 p.m.: President-elect Biden addresses the nation, calling on President Trump to "demand an end to this siege".
- 4:08 p.m.: From a secure location, Vice President Pence phoned Christopher Miller, the acting defense secretary, to confirm the Capitol was not secure and ask military leaders for a deadline for securing the building while demanding that the Capitol be cleared.
- 4:10 p.m.: Army Secretary McCarthy arrives at D.C. Metropolitan Police Department Headquarters.
- 4:14 p.m.: Hope Hicks texts Julie Radford (Ivanka Trump's aide): "In one day he ended every future opportunity that doesn't include speaking engagements at the local proud boys chapter / And all of us that didn't have jobs lined up will be perpetually unemployed / I'm so mad and upset / We all look like domestic terrorists now."

==== Trump speaks (4:17 p.m.) ====
- 4:17 p.m.: Trump uploads an unscripted video to his Twitter denouncing the riot but maintaining the false claim that the election was stolen. Of the three takes he gave, White House aides chose this one as the "most palatable option" for distribution. In the video, Trump says:

I know your pain, I know you're hurt. We had an election that was stolen from us. It was a landslide election and everyone knows it, especially the other side. But you have to go home now. We have to have peace. We have to have law and order. We have to respect our great people in law and order. We don't want anybody hurt. It's a very tough period of time. There's never been a time like this where such a thing happened where they could take it away from all of us—from me, from you, from our country. This was a fraudulent election, but we can't play into the hands of these people. We have to have peace. So go home. We love you. You're very special. You've seen what happens. You see the way others are treated that are so bad and so evil. I know how you feel, but go home, and go home in peace.

==== Riot continues ====
- 4:17 p.m.: According to the House committee's final report: "Giuliani began frantically calling the White House line the very minute that the President's video went up on Twitter. Failing to get through, he called back, once every minute—4:17 p.m., 4:18 p.m., 4:19 p.m., 4:20 p.m. He managed to get through, briefly, to Mark Meadows at 4:21 p.m., and then kept calling the White House line: at 4:22 p.m., three times on two different phones at 4:23 p.m., 4:24 p.m., and once more at 5:05 p.m."
- 4:18 p.m.: Secretary Miller, Gen. Milley, Army Secretary McCarthy, and Gen. Hokanson discuss availability of National Guard forces located outside of the immediate D.C. Metro area. Secretary Miller verbally authorizes mustering and deployment of out-of-State National Guard forces to D.C.

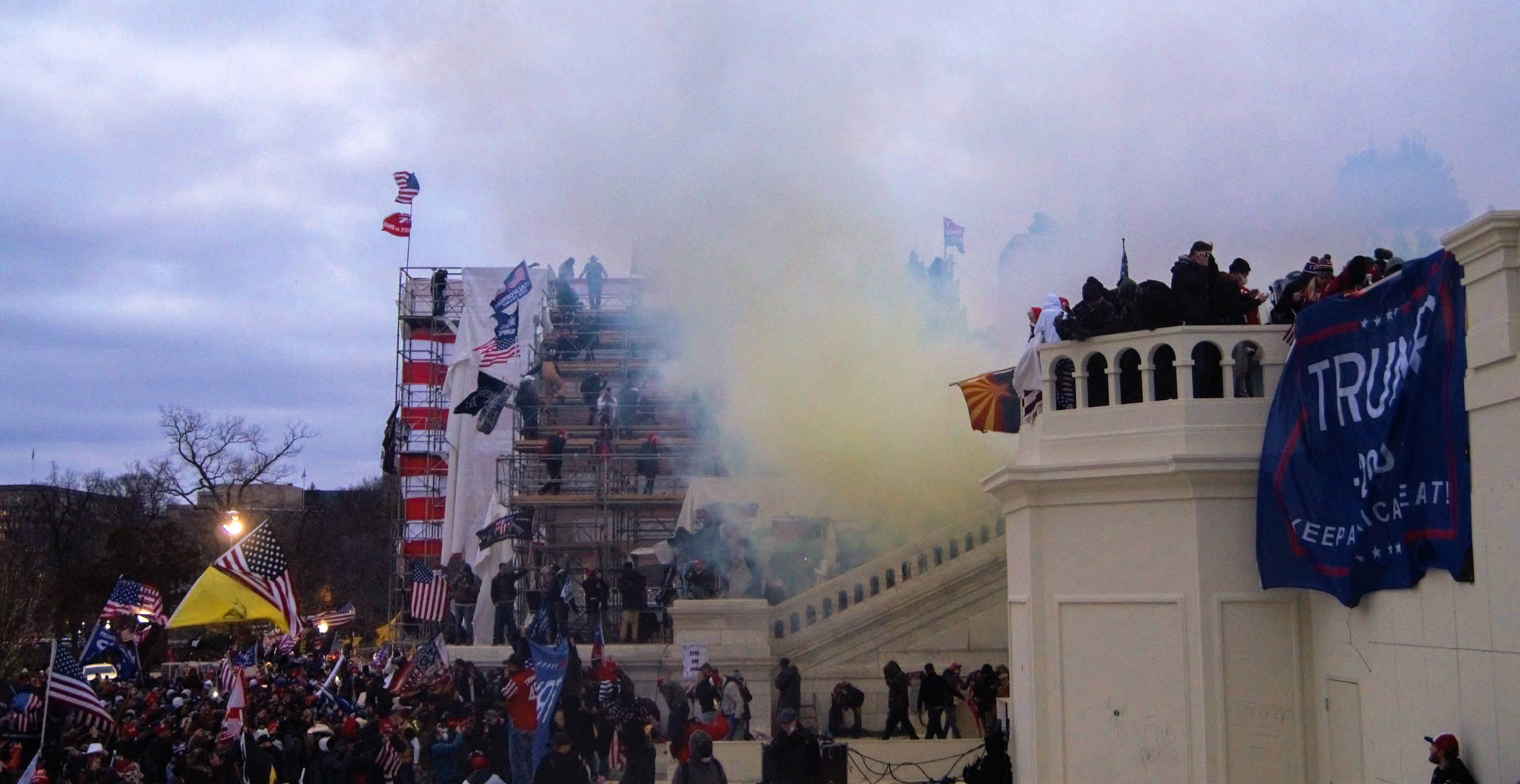
Tear gas on the west Capitol steps at 4:20 p.m.

- 4:22 p.m.: Pelosi speaks to Pence on the phone about how to move forward with the election certification. She wonders if the Republicans could "confine it to just one complaint, Arizona, and then we could vote and...move forward with the rest of the states." She suspects it may be "days" before it is possible to enter the Capitol again.
- 4:26 p.m.: Rosanne Boyland, as shown in bodycam video, collapses and is taken to the hospital where she is later pronounced dead of an amphetamine overdose.
- 4:32 p.m.: Secretary Miller authorizes DCNG to actually deploy in support of the U.S. Capitol Police.
- 4:34 p.m.: A White House landline places a call to the cell phone of Anton Lunyk, a rioter who had entered the Capitol an hour earlier. The call lasts nine seconds. (The call was first publicly disclosed in September 2022 and is the only known call between the White House and a rioter that day.)
- 4:40 p.m.: Army Secretary McCarthy has a phone call with Maryland Governor Hogan in which the Governor agrees to send Maryland NG forces to D.C., expected the next day.
- 4:57 p.m.: CNN reports that congressional leaders are being evacuated to Fort McNair, a nearby Army base. Nancy Pelosi's daughter, Alexandra Pelosi, films her mother leaving the Capitol. Nancy Pelosi complains that the National Guard was not on the scene: "How many times did the members ask, 'Are we prepared? Are we prepared?' We're not prepared for the worst. We're calling the National Guard — now? It should have been here to start out." The congressional leaders consider reconvening the Electoral College proceedings at Fort McNair. While at Fort McNair, Senator Chuck Schumer speaks to Army Secretary Ryan McCarthy by phone, telling him:
  "D.C. has requested the National Guard, and it's been denied by DOD. I'd like to know a good fucking reason why it's been denied. We need them fast. We've all had to— I've never seen anything like this."

===== 5:00 p.m. =====
At some point during the "afternoon", Trump tried to call into Lou Dobbs Tonight, which aired every weekday at 5 p.m., but Fox executives decided it would be "irresponsible" to allow him on the air.

- 5:07 p.m.: Giuliani reaches Trump by phone after 50 minutes of failed attempts. They speak for almost 12 minutes. (Over the next three hours until Congress reconvenes, Giuliani calls Senators Marsha Blackburn, Mike Lee, Bill Hagerty, Lindsey Graham, Josh Hawley, Ted Cruz, and Dan Sullivan, as well as Representative Jim Jordan. On Senator Lee's phone, he leaves a voicemail intended for Senator Tommy Tuberville, asking him to "raise issues", "object to every State", and "get a hearing for every State" for the purpose of delaying the process "ideally until the end of tomorrow.")
- 5:08 p.m.: Army senior leaders relay to Major General Walker the Secretary of Defense's permission to deploy the DCNG to the Capitol.
- 5:20 p.m.: The first contingent of 155 Guard members, dressed in riot gear, began arriving at the Capitol.
- 5:40 p.m.: 154 DCNG soldiers arrive at the Capitol Complex, swear in with the Capitol Police, and begin support operations, having departed the D.C. Armory at 5:02 p.m.
- Around 5:40 p.m.: As the interior of the Capitol is cleared of rioters, leaders of Congress state that they will continue tallying electoral votes.
- 5:45 p.m.: Secretary Miller signs formal authorization for out-of-State National Guard to muster and deploy in support of U.S. Capitol Police.

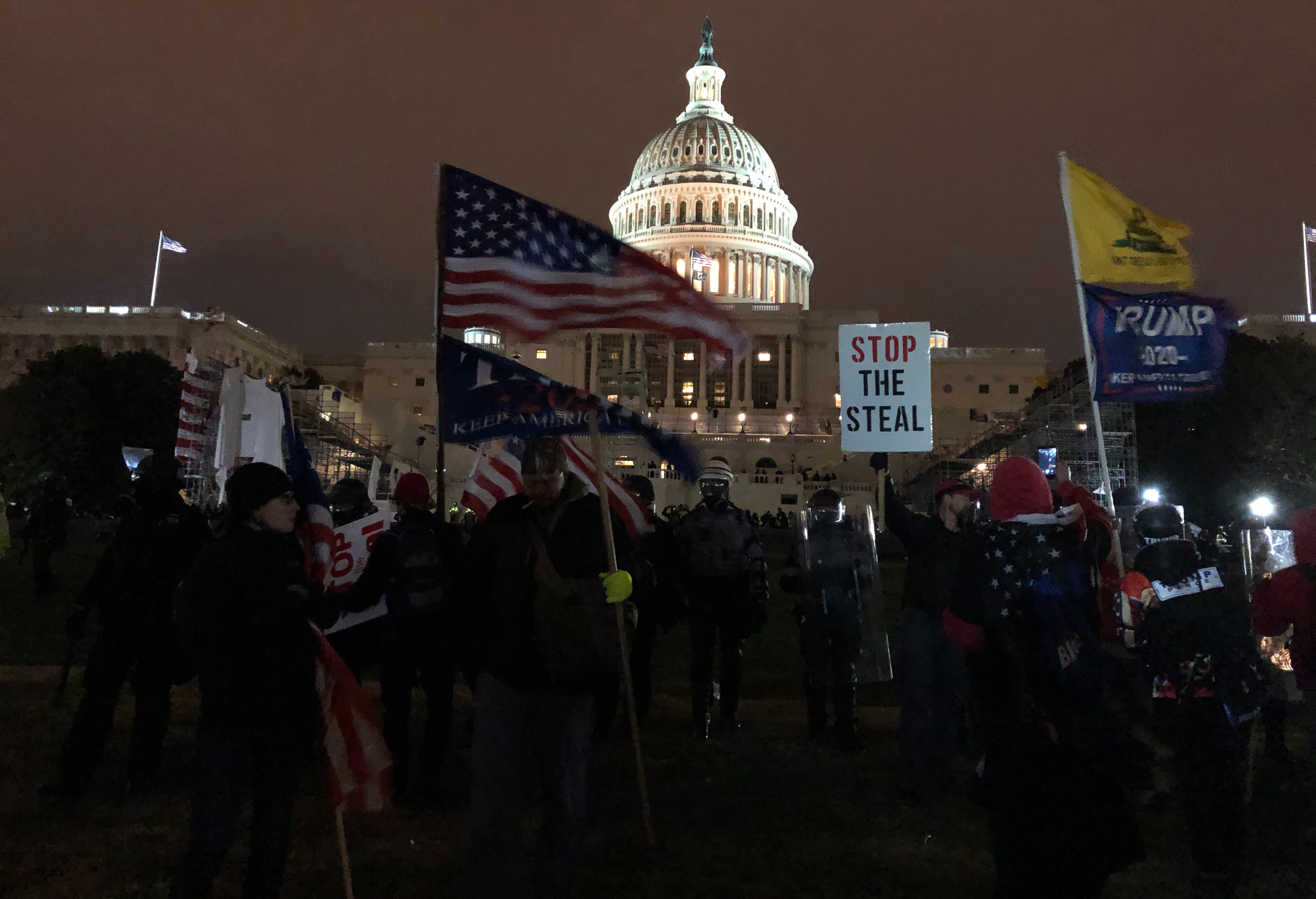
A police line push rioters away from the western side of the Capitol at 5:46 p.m.

- Around 5:45 p.m.: Police announce that Ashli Babbitt, the rioter shot inside the Capitol, has died.
- 5:58 p.m.: Pence—calling from the basement of the Capitol, where he is standing with the chief of the U.S. Capitol Police, Steven Sund—talks to Speaker of the House Nancy Pelosi by phone. He says that Sund "just informed me what you will hear through official channels": that the police expect to secure the Capitol soon, and thus Pelosi can expect to hear from Paul Irving, the Sergeant-at-Arms, who is "your point of contact on security in the House", about "the process for reentering" the building so that the leaders can reconvene the House and the Senate in about an hour. Pence says he also plans to speak to Senate Minority Leader Chuck Schumer, and Pelosi passes the phone to him. Pence repeats the message and tells Schumer he wants to give him a "heads up," although Pence said he's already informed the Senate and that Schumer can expect to hear directly from the Sergeant-at-Arms. "I hope that's helpful. I'll let you talk through regular channels", Pence says.
- Shortly before 6 p.m.: Trump shows Nick Luna a draft tweet that begins: "These are the things and events that happen..." Luna tells Trump that it makes him sound as though he directed the violence. Trump sends it anyway a few minutes later.

===== 6:00 p.m. =====
- 6:00 p.m.: D.C. curfew comes into effect.
- 6:01 p.m.: President Trump tweets
  These are the things and events that happen when a sacred landslide election victory is so unceremoniously & viciously stripped away from great patriots who have been badly & unfairly treated for so long. Go home with love & in peace. Remember this day forever!
  When Twitter reinstated Trump's account in November 2022, this tweet was gone. Trump "knew exactly what he was doing" in making this tweet—the U.S. House select committee on January 6 alleged when criminally referring him for insurrection—especially as a White House staffer, Nick Luna, had warned him not to tweet it since it would imply his complicity in the Capitol riot, yet "he tweeted it anyway."
- 6:09 p.m.: Rosanne Boyland is pronounced dead at a local hospital after collapsing near a tunnel entrance on the west side of the Capitol.
- 6:14 p.m.: U.S. Capitol Police, D.C. Metropolitan Police, and DCNG successfully establish a perimeter on the west side of the U.S. Capitol.
- 6:30 p.m.: Chief Sund briefs Pence, Pelosi, Schumer and other members of congressional leadership on the security situation, advising that both chambers could reopen by 7:30 p.m.

===== 7:00 p.m. =====
- 7:00 p.m.: Facebook, Inc. removes President Trump's posts from Facebook and Instagram for "contribut[ing] to, rather than diminish[ing], the risk of ongoing violence."
- 7:02 p.m.: Twitter removes Trump's tweets and suspends his account for twelve hours for "repeated and severe violations of [its] Civic Integrity policy".
- 7:04 p.m.: Keith Kellogg emails Marc Short, saying: "finish the Electoral College issue TONIGHT." Short replies 10 minutes later: "That's our plan".
- 7:13 p.m.: Members of Congress return to the Capitol.
- 7:21 p.m.: Trump's former campaign manager Brad Parscale texts Katrina Pierson, saying the riot was the result of a "sitting president asking for civil war ... I feel guilty for helping him win ... a woman is dead ... If I was trump [sic] and knew my rhetoric killed someone". Pierson replied: "It wasn't the rhetoric". Parscale insisted: "Yes it was."
- 7:59 p.m.: Stephanie Grisham, chief of staff to Melania Trump and former White House press secretary, tweets her resignation, becoming the first official to resign post-attack.

==== Congress reconvenes (8:00 p.m.) ====
- 8:00 p.m.: U.S. Capitol Police declare the Capitol building to be secure.
- 8:06 p.m.: The Senate reconvenes, with Vice President Pence presiding, to continue debating the objection to the Arizona electoral count.
- 8:31 p.m.: The Federal Protective Service issues a memo warning that an armed militia group is reportedly traveling from West Virginia to D.C.
- 8:36 p.m.: Facebook blocks Trump's page for 24 hours.
- 8:39 p.m.: Giuliani calls Trump and they speak for 9 minutes.
- 9:00 p.m.: Speaker Pelosi reopens the House debate.
- 10:00 p.m.: Officer Brian Sicknick collapses while still on duty at Capitol building.
- 10:15 p.m.: The Senate votes 93–6 against the objection raised by a handful of Republican senators against the counting of Arizona's electoral votes.
- 11:30 p.m.: The House votes 303–121 to reject the Republican objection to the counting of Arizona's electoral votes.

Also

- (time unspecified): A tactical team of the FBI Hostage Rescue Team was one of the first outside federal agencies to enter the Capitol (see "National Mission Force", Jan 3 above)
- (time unspecified): Donald Trump's allies planned for him to give another speech the following day to disavow the violence. Trump rejected several lines from the script and crossed them out. The rejected lines included: "I am directing the Department of Justice to ensure all lawbreakers are prosecuted to the fullest extent of the law. We must send a clear message—not with mercy but with JUSTICE. Legal consequences must be swift and firm. ... I want to be very clear: you do not represent me. You do not represent our movement." Ivanka Trump testified to the House committee: "I'm not sure when those conversations began, because they could have started early the next morning [the 7th], but I believe...they started...the evening of the 6th."

== Aftermath ==
=== Thursday, January 7, 2021 ===
- 12:15 a.m.: Republican Representative Scott Perry (R-PA) and Senator Josh Hawley (R-MO) objected to the counting of Pennsylvania's electoral votes, triggering a two-hour debate in both chambers.
- 12:55 a.m.: The Senate rejects, 92–7, the objection raised by a handful of Republican senators against the counting of Pennsylvania's electoral votes.
- 2:20 a.m.: A small number of representatives nearly have a physical confrontation in the House chamber. After Representative Conor Lamb (D-PA) said the attack on the Capitol by the angry pro-Trump mob earlier in the day was "inspired by lies, the same lies you are hearing in this room tonight," Representative Morgan Griffith (R-VA) objected to Lamb's remarks; the objection was rejected by Speaker Pelosi. Several minutes later, members of both parties have a heated verbal discussion in the middle aisle in close proximity, breaking up when Pelosi called for order.
- 3:10 a.m.: The House rejects, 282–138, the Republican objection against the counting of Pennsylvania's electoral votes.
- Around 3:40 a.m.: After all the objections are rejected, Congress completes the counting of the electoral votes, with Biden winning, 306–232; Vice President Pence affirms the election result, formally declaring Biden the winner.
- 3:49 a.m.: Dan Scavino tweets: "Statement by President Donald J. Trump on the Electoral Certification: 'Even though I totally disagree with the outcome of the election, and the facts bear me out, nevertheless there will be an orderly transition on January 20th. I have always said we would continue our fight to ensure that only legal votes were counted. While this represents the end of the greatest first term in presidential history, it's only the beginning of our fight to Make America Great Again!'"
- 2:30 p.m.: During a televised press conference, Nancy Pelosi asks for the resignation of the US Capitol Police Chief Steven Sund, adding "I think Mr. Sund ... He hasn't even called us since this happened". Sund submits letter of resignation that afternoon with a departure date of January 16. Both Sergeant at Arms are forced to resign as well.
- 7:10 p.m.: Shortly after Twitter unlocked Trump's account, Trump released a video statement condemning the violence at the Capitol, saying that "a new administration will be inaugurated" and that his "focus now turns to ensuring a smooth, orderly, and seamless transition of power" to the Biden administration. This was more than 24 hours after his previous speech in the Rose Garden. Fear of being removed from power by the Twenty-fifth Amendment to the United States Constitution was one motivation for Trump to seek the "cover" of this speech, according to Cassidy Hutchinson's testimony before the January 6 house committee. He made "multiple stops and starts", requesting Diet Cokes during the recording, in contrast to his usual method of "one or two takes, call it a day", White House chief photographer Shealah Craighead testified to the House committee. While verbally workshopping the speech on camera, Trump had commented as an aside to his staff: "I don't want to say 'The election is over'."
- Around 9:30 p.m.: Capitol Police officer Brian D. Sicknick dies after suffering two strokes. Francisco J. Diaz, the DC medical examiner who performed an autopsy to ascertain the cause of Sicknick's death, said in an interview reported in the Washington Post that he found no evidence of internal or external injury in or on Sicknick's body nor any evidence that he'd suffered an allergic reaction to chemical irritants.

=== Friday, January 8, 2021 ===
- 10:00 a.m.: Chief Sund is notified by the new acting Senate Sergeant at Arms that his departure is to be effective January 8 not January 16 as previously agreed upon. Yogananda Pittman is sworn in as acting Chief of the US Capitol Police that afternoon.
- President Trump tweets that he will not attend Biden's inauguration ceremony on January 20. This is Trump's last tweet before his permanent ban on Twitter the same day.
- Twitter permanently bans Trump from its platform. Following at least two internal meetings that afternoon by Twitter's trust and safety team, Twitter informs the team internally at 6:21 p.m. that Trump's account has been suspended, then announces its decision publicly, citing "the risk of further incitement of violence". (The ban is lifted by Elon Musk on November 11, 2022, after he gains control over Twitter.)
- Parler, a platform allegedly used to plan the attack, is removed from the Google Play Store after the users on the app allegedly planned further violence at the Capitol.
- FBI assistant director Steven D'Antuono tells reporters that there is no indication that Antifa members stormed the Capitol.

=== Saturday, January 9, 2021 ===
- The flag outside the Capitol building is lowered to half-staff to pay respect to officer Sicknick who died on January 7 after suffering a stroke.
- Citing posts that risked incitement of violence, Apple removes Parler from its App Store, stating Parler's moderation procedures toward violence-inciting speech were insufficient.
- For similar reasons, Amazon Web Services announces it will terminate hosting services for Parler through its cloud servers at 11:59 p.m. on January 10; this will result in Parler's complete shutdown, unless the platform can find another hosting service before it is removed from Amazon's servers. Amazon employee group Amazon Employees For Climate Justice had called on the company to terminate web hosting of the platform unless Parler changed its moderation policies, after Amazon reported 98 instances of posts featured on Parler that "clearly encourage and incite violence."

=== Sunday, January 10, 2021 ===
- Karoline Leavitt, having just left her job at the White House Press Office to work for Representative Elise Stefanik, called a Capitol Hill police officer a "hero" for keeping rioters away from lawmakers. She would later delete the post.

=== Monday, January 11, 2021 ===
- 2:59 a.m. (11:59 p.m. PST): Parler goes offline after being suspended from Amazon's cloud servers for hosting violent content.
- The National Guard is authorized to send up to 15,000 troops to Washington as a security measure to safeguard the Capitol.
- The FBI bulletin disseminated to the media reports that armed far-right pro-Trump protests were planned at all 50 state capitols and at the United States Capitol from January 17 through January 20, 2021, Joe Biden's Inauguration Day.
- Trump and Pence saw each other at a meeting. According to Pence in his memoir, Trump said he'd "just learned" that Pence's wife and daughter had been at the Capitol during the attack, and he asked how they were. Trump then wondered aloud: "What if we hadn't had the rally? What if they hadn't gone to the Capitol? adding, "It's too terrible to end like this."

=== Tuesday, January 12, 2021 ===
- Pence sat for an interview with documentary filmmaker Alex Holder. While on camera, he received an email with information related to the potential use of the Twenty-fifth Amendment against Trump. Holder's documentary claims the email contained the draft House resolution demanding that Pence invoke the 25th Amendment, but a spokesperson for Pence countered that Pence had already written to Speaker Pelosi rejecting the Twenty-fifth Amendment option and that, in the film, Pence was receiving confirmation that someone had sent his letter to Pelosi.

=== Wednesday, January 13, 2021 ===
- President Trump is impeached for an unprecedented second time by the House of Representatives for the high crime of Incitement of Insurrection for "inciting violence against the Government of the United States." The impeachment article mentions his January 2 phone call with Brad Raffensperger.
- The Federal Bureau of Investigation (FBI) sends out a bulletin advising law enforcement agencies to be cautious when arresting suspects involved in the storming, especially of those who were spotted wearing body armor or "other armament" during the incident.

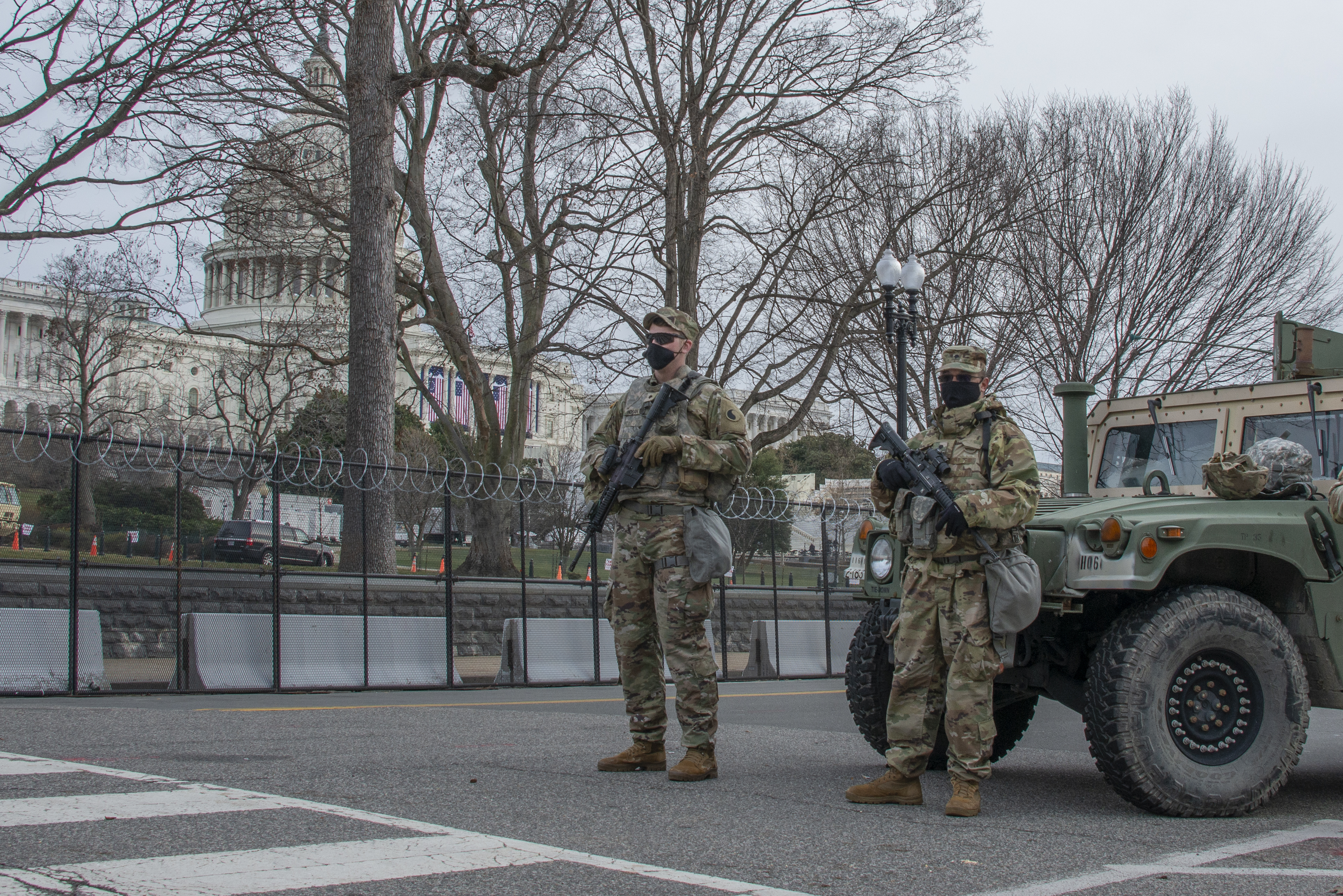
Soldiers with the Virginia National Guard on January 16

=== Sunday, January 17, 2021 ===
- Representative Ralph Norman sends a text message to White House Chief of Staff Mark Meadows asking him to urge Trump to invoke martial law to prevent Biden's inauguration.

=== Tuesday, January 19, 2021 ===
- The Oregon Republican Party passes a resolution condemning the Republican House members who voted to impeach Trump; this resolution claims there is growing evidence the attack on the Capitol was a "false flag" operation designed to discredit Trump.
- Police take a notebook from Oath Keeper Thomas Caldwell's home. It contains an apparent threat against two Georgia pollworkers (who would later testify in the House committee's fourth public hearing on June 21, 2022).

=== Wednesday, January 20, 2021 ===
- In the inauguration of Joe Biden at the United States Capitol, former Vice President Joe Biden is sworn in as the 46th president of the United States. Senator Kamala Harris is sworn in as the 49th vice president of the United States. Numerous members of the DCNG, the NG of surrounding states, Capitol Police, and DC Police guard the closed-off premises.

=== Wednesday, January 27, 2021 ===
- The Chief of the Metropolitan Police Department announces that a second officer present at the riot died by suicide. The Chief also mentions that many other officers are suffering from trauma related to the riot.
- Three Oath Keepers are indicted for planning with other Oath Keepers to commit violence at the Capitol on January 6.

=== February 16, 2021 ===
- The New York Times updates its report about Brian Sicknick being killed with a fire extinguisher, as medical experts say he did not die of blunt force trauma.

=== February 19, 2021 ===
- Six additional Oath Keepers are indicted for conspiring to commit violence at the Capitol.

=== April 19, 2021 ===
- The Washington, D.C., medical examiner's office announced its finding that Capitol Police officer Brian Sicknick had died from a stroke, classifying his death as natural, with Sicknick's autopsy producing neither evidence of internal or external injuries, nor evidence of allergic reaction to chemical irritants.

=== May 19, 2021 ===
- Initially, the U.S. House of Representatives voted to form an independent bicameral commission to investigate the attack, similar to the 9/11 Commission, but Senate Republicans filibustered this plan.

=== June 30, 2021 ===
- The House passed H.Res.503, "Establishing the Select Committee to Investigate the January 6th Attack on the United States Capitol", forming the United States House Select Committee on the January 6 Attack. All Democratic members and two Republican members, Adam Kinzinger and Liz Cheney, voted in favor. The committee members were appointed in July. This committee lasted a year and a half, through the end of 2022.
