= Peace Circle =

Traffic circle in Washington, D.C.

Coordinates: 38°53′26″N 77°00′44″W

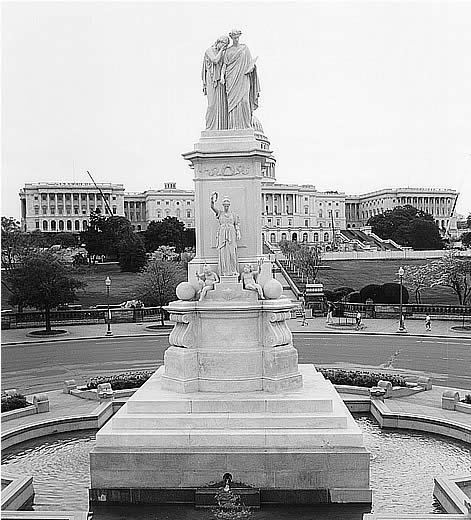
- Peace Circle from the northwest
- Interactive map of Peace Circle

Location
- Washington, DC
- Roads at junction: Pennsylvania Avenue NW; 1st Street NW

Construction
- Type: Traffic circle
- Maintained by: DDOT

Peace Circle is a traffic circle in Washington, D.C., located at the intersection of Pennsylvania Avenue and First Street NW. At its center is the Peace Monument, also known as the Naval Memorial. It is a monument to the naval deaths during the American Civil War. The monument is topped by the allegorical sculptures of Grief and History. On the southeast side facing the United States Capitol there is a figure of Peace, and on the northwest side, there are figures of Victory and the babies Mars and Neptune. The monument is located on Capitol grounds adjacent to the Capitol Reflection Pool. The monument was sculpted by Franklin Simmons and completed in 1878. The monument was restored in the 1990s. The January 6 Capitol attack in 2021 physically started at the circle.

== History ==
The monument atop Peace Circle is in honor of the sailors who lost their lives during the American Civil War. The monument was originally to be placed at Annapolis, but for an unknown reason was built in Washington D.C. instead. The idea was created by Admiral David D. Porter, he was so enthused with the project that he fundraised for it personally and sketched a draft for it himself, this draft was passed on to Franklin Simmons who ended up sculpting the structure, along with the Bonanni Brothers in Rome Italy.

The structure fell into disrepair until the 1970s where the Architect of the Capitol (AOC) was assigned to take care of it, modern weathering such as acid rain and protestors climbing the statue caused even limbs to fall off of the statues. The AOC added a special layer of protective mineral solution in order to protect the marble from modern wear and tear.

The January 6 Capitol attack in 2021 physically started at a Capitol Police barricade on the east side of the Peace Circle, when Ryan Samsel attacked police officer Caroline Edwards, who fell on a stair handrail and got knocked unconscious.

== See also ==
- List of circles in Washington, D.C.
- Peace Monument
- List of public art in Washington, D.C., Ward 6
