= Ryan Samsel =

American participant in January 6 U.S. Capitol attack

- Born: Ryan Stephen Samsel; 1983/1984 (age 42–43)
- Occupation: Barber
- Known for: Participation in the January 6 United States Capitol attack

Ryan Stephen Samsel (born 1983/1984) is an American former barber and convicted felon who participated in the January 6 United States Capitol attack. He was charged with several crimes, including forcibly assaulting federal officers; engaging in physical violence in a restricted building or grounds; carrying out an act of physical violence in the Capitol grounds; and obstruction of an official proceeding—the United States Congress's efforts to certify the election results. Samsel was in custody since his arrest; his bench trial began in October 2023. In February 2024, he was found guilty.

On January 20, 2025, after beginning his second term in office, President Trump issued pardons to roughly 1,500 individuals charged with crimes connected to the January 6 attack, including Samsel, who was responsible for violently attacking Capitol Police officer Caroline Edwards.

== Background ==
Samsel is a barber from Bristol, Bucks County, Pennsylvania. A Donald Trump supporter, he lives with his aunt and uncle.

Samsel has been convicted of violent behavior on two occasions and accused of violent criminal behavior on several other occasions:

- In 2006, he allegedly attempted to pull a woman off the road in his car because she owed him $60, punched her windshield, and threatened to kill her.
- In 2007, he reportedly entered a man's car, and hit him repeatedly in the face, leaving him missing teeth and bloodied.
- In 2015, Samsel was again convicted of simple assault for choking a woman until she was unconscious and hitting her so hard that she suffered a hematoma.
- In 2019, another woman alleged that Samsel broke into her house violating a restraining order, choked her until she was unconscious, assaulted her, and raped her multiple times.
- As of January 2021, Samsel had a 2019 assault-related arrest warrant out from Riverside, New Jersey, and was on state parole in Pennsylvania.

== January 6 riot ==
On January 6, 2021, Samsel went to the United States Capitol, where a joint session of the United States Congress was certifying the vote of the Electoral College and affirming Joe Biden's victory in the 2020 United States presidential election. He went with his girlfriend Raechel Genco, a Bristol Township woman, who was also later charged by federal authorities.

Samsel, wearing a MAGA hat, had a private conversation outside the Capitol with Joseph Biggs, a top lieutenant in the far-right group the Proud Boys, as they put their arms around each other. Samsel later told FBI investigators that Biggs had pulled him aside and encouraged him to push the barricades, and challenge and confront the Capitol police.

After his conversation with Biggs, at 12:53 p.m. Samsel walked to the front of the crowd while turning his hat backward and removing his jacket. He walked alone past the protesters directly towards the police barricades, approached a metal barricade at the Peace Circle on the west side of the Capitol and shoved it aggressively, and confronted the police working to secure the Capitol, resulting in the first breach of the Capitol’s security perimeter. The New York Times called the moment "the tipping point of the riot." As others joined him, the barricade fell, a police officer was knocked down, and the riot followed. Within seconds dozens of other protesters, including many Proud Boys, followed Samsel and overran the police line, overpowering the police, and stormed towards the U.S. Capitol Building.

Videotape showed Samsel attacking Capitol Police Officer Caroline Edwards. Edwards later testified to a House of Representatives committee that Samsel pushed a barricade over in a struggle, knocking her down and causing her to hit her head, lose consciousness, and suffer a concussion and a brain injury. Samsel allegedly picked her up and said: "We don’t have to hurt you. Why are you standing in our way?" She was rescued by her fellow police officers.

Samsel was also accused of confronting other officers and attempting to steal a riot shield from an officer.

== Arrest, charges, and trial ==
Samsel was arrested on January 20, 2021, in Bristol Township, Pennsylvania, by a task force made up of FBI agents and local police. He was charged with several crimes, including forcibly assaulting federal officers; engaging in physical violence in a restricted building or grounds; carrying out an act of physical violence in the Capitol grounds; and obstruction of an official proceeding—Congress’s certification of the election results.

In May 2022, Samsel was moved from a federal prison in central Pennsylvania to the Federal Detention Center in Philadelphia, Pennsylvania. He was in custody awaiting trial since his arrest. While in custody, he allegedly sent a letter that said: "all these poltions [sic] in office need to go, A woodchiper [sic] sounds good" and "I'll tell people get your wepon's [sic] Ready Kiss your Kidd's [sic] good-bye and let's Fucking go!" He also allegedly made phone calls from prison in which he made statements about "stabbing or punching FBI agents."

Samsel was represented by lawyer Stanley Woodward. His bench trial began in October 2023 before U.S. District Judge for the District of Columbia Jia Cobb. He was found guilty in February 2024 and was set to be sentenced on February 4, 2025.

On January 20, 2025, after beginning his second term in office, President Trump issued pardons to Samsel and roughly 1,500 other individuals charged with crimes connected to January 6. Samsel alleged that he had been abused in custody; prosecutors disputed this, stating that Samsel fabricated the claims to file a lawsuit.

== See also ==
- List of cases of the January 6 United States Capitol attack (M-S)
- Criminal proceedings in the January 6 United States Capitol attack
- List of people granted executive clemency in the second Trump presidency
