= Wisconsin prosecution of fake electors =

Criminal prosecution concerning the Trump fake electors scheme

Wisconsin v. Chesebro, et al.
- Court: Dane County Circuit Court, Wisconsin
- Full case name: State of Wisconsin v. Kenneth J. Chesebro, Michael A. Roman, & James R. Troupis
- Docket nos.: 2024CF001293, 2024CF001294, 2024CF001295
- Charge: Conspiracy (Forgery), Fraud

Court membership
- Judge sitting: John D. Hyland

State of Wisconsin v. Kenneth Chesebro, et al. is a state criminal prosecution concerning the Trump fake electors plot in Wisconsin. The three defendants, Kenneth J. Chesebro, Michael A. Roman, and James R. Troupis, were lawyers and political aides to Donald Trump's 2020 presidential campaign involved in planning and producing fraudulent electoral vote paperwork as part of a plot to replace or nullify the official electoral votes of the state of Wisconsin in the 2020 presidential election. The three defendants were each initially charged with a single count of conspiracy to utter forged official documents as legitimate; subsequently, ten additional charges were added for each defendant, one for each Republican elector who—the prosecution alleges—were defrauded into signing the false paperwork by the accused.

== Background ==
Joe Biden won the 2020 presidential election in Wisconsin, carrying the state by 20,682 votes. His slate of electors in Wisconsin was therefore the official electoral college slate for Wisconsin in the 2020 presidential election, entitled to cast their ten votes for president on December 14, 2020, and have those votes conveyed to and counted by the United States Congress on January 6, 2021.

The incumbent president, Donald Trump, lost the election in Wisconsin and nationally, in both the popular vote and electoral college vote. In the days immediately after the presidential election, in November 2020, employees and allies of the Trump campaign sought to challenge the results of the election through various lawsuits. In the midst of that litigation, Kenneth Chesebro, a Trump campaign lawyer, suggested that the campaign should target the January 6, 2021, counting of electoral votes. For that purpose, he suggested that Trump's Wisconsin electoral slate—which had not been elected by the voters of Wisconsin—should meet anyway on the prescribed date—December 14, 2020—and should cast their votes as though they were the state's official electors, fill out paperwork to that effect, and transmit it to Washington. He conveyed this plan to Jim Troupis, a top legal advisor for Trump's campaign in Wisconsin, and after sharing their plans with other leaders of the Trump campaign, including Mike Roman, they proceed with the plan in Wisconsin and provided a template for similar operations in other states.

Initially, this plan was described as a safeguard to preserve the possibility of sending the votes of Trump's electoral slate as the official electoral votes if the Trump campaign prevailed in one of their legal challenges in state or federal court, but the plot continued even as those legal challenges failed. On November 30, the Wisconsin Elections Commission completed a certification of votes following a recount requested by Trump's campaign. That same day, governor Tony Evers signed a certificate of ascertainment, certifying that the Biden electoral slate had received the most votes and were therefore Wisconsin's official slate of presidential electors for 2020. Trump filed additional lawsuits challenging this certification, but those lawsuits were dismissed by United States District Court for the Eastern District of Wisconsin (on December 11) and the Wisconsin Supreme Court (on the morning of December 14).

At noon on December 14, 2020, Wisconsin's ten legitimate presidential electors met at the Wisconsin State Capitol, cast their votes for Joe Biden and Kamala Harris, and signed paperwork conveying their votes to the United States Congress and the National Archives and Records Administration. At the same time, in another part of the Capitol, nine of the ten Trump electors met, elected a tenth elector to fill the vacancy of the missing tenth elector, then signed paperwork provided by Chesebro attesting that they were the "duly elected and qualified Electors for President and Vice President of the United States of America from the State of Wisconsin", and asserting their ten votes should be counted for Donald Trump and Mike Pence.

The fraudulent paperwork was passed to U.S. Senator Ron Johnson and his chief of staff. They then attempted to convey the paperwork to Vice President Mike Pence before the certification of electoral votes on January 6, 2021, but Pence staff refused the documents. Following the riot which disrupted the counting of electoral votes on January 6, the fraudulent elector scheme was brought to light by journalists and the January 6 committee investigation.

=== Other litigation ===
Following investigations, the fraudulent elector scheme resulted in criminal charges in four other states. Chesebro was subpoenaed by a grand jury in Fulton County, Georgia, in July 2022. In August 2023, he was one of eighteen people indicted for his role in the alleged racketeering conspiracy by Fulton County district attorney Fani Willis. Chesebro reached a plea agreement with Fulton County prosecutors on October 20, 2023, pleading guilty to a single felony count of conspiracy to file false documents, and received five years probation.

Chesebro was identified as an unindicted co-conspirator in the federal prosecution of Donald Trump for allegedly leading the conspiracy to defraud the United States and obstruct the counting of electoral votes. He was also then listed as an unindicted co-conspirator in the Arizona prosecution of fake electors in 2023. In July 2023, Michigan Attorney General Dana Nessel indicted Michigan's 16 false electors, then in December 2023, a Nevada grand jury also indicted conspirators involved in the fake elector plot.

Chesebro is said to be cooperating with prosecutors from multiple states and has entered into proffer agreements in order to give himself some protection from prosecution.

=== Civil case ===
On May 17, 2022, the progressive legal advocacy group Law Forward filed civil lawsuit against the ten false Wisconsin electors along with Chesebro and Troupis, on behalf of the ten legitimate Wisconsin electors. The case was known as Khary Penebaker et al. v. Andrew Hitt et al. After pre-trial hearings and discovery, the ten Trump electors reached a settlement with the plaintiffs on December 6, 2023, acknowledging that their votes were cast on December 14, 2020, at the behest of the Trump campaign and the Republican Party of Wisconsin, and were part of an effort to overturn the results of the 2020 election and disrupt the peaceful transition of power.

Chesebro and Troupis settled with the Penebaker plaintiffs on March 4, 2024, turning over a trove of additional documents detailing their role in the plot.

== Indictment ==
On June 4, 2024, Wisconsin Attorney General Josh Kaul filed a criminal complaint against Kenneth J. Chesebro, Michael A. Roman, and James R. Troupis. The indictment alleged that they had conspired to commit the crime of uttering as genuine a forged writing or object, in violation of Wis. Stat. §§ 939.31 and 943.38(2). On December 9, 2024, ten more charges were added for each defendant, alleging that they "with intent to defraud, by means of deceit obtained the signature" of each of the ten electors on the falsified electoral vote certificate.

=== Defendants ===
- Kenneth J. Chesebro was an outside advisor to the Trump 2020 campaign. He was the original author of the fraudulent elector memo, and worked on the production of false elector paperwork. He also attended the meeting of the false electors when they signed the fraudulent paperwork.
- Michael A. Roman was national director of election day operations for the Trump 2020 campaign, and had previously served as an opposition research director for Trump in the 2016 campaign and for one year in the White House. He participated in conveying the fraudulent paperwork to the United States Congress.
- James R. Troupis was the chief legal staffer for the Trump 2020 campaign in Wisconsin. He collaborated with Chesebro on the elector plan and the production of false elector paperwork.

== Initial proceedings ==
On December 12, 2024, the first hearing was held before Judge Ellen K. Berz, where bond terms were set for the defendants. After the arraignment, the case was assigned to Judge John Hyland. Several defendant motions to dismiss were filed and briefed in February 2025; Judge Hyland denied the motions to dismiss in August 2025.

Following the August 2025 ruling on the motion to dismiss, attorneys for Jim Troupis filed a motion to request that Hyland recuse himself as judge. Their complaint alleges that an "expert on writing style" concluded that Judge Hyland's August 2025 ruling on the motion to dismiss borrowed significantly from previously-written opinions by now-retired Dane County circuit judge Frank Remington, and further alleged that this constituted a form of judicial misconduct. Hyland issued a decision rejecting the motion, but Wisconsin U.S. senator Ron Johnson—who was himself involved in the 2020 fake elector plot—has requested that the federal Department of Justice investigate the misconduct allegation against Judge Hyland.

On December 15, 2025, Judge Hyland ruled that there was sufficient evidence for the case to proceed to trial against Troupis and Roman; as to the case against Chesebro, the judge deferred his decision until a separate hearing could be held on the admissibility of statements made by Chesebro to investigators.

In February 2026, Troupis asked the Wisconsin Supreme Court to review his claim of judicial misconduct. He also asked Wisconsin Supreme Court Chief Justice Jill Karofsky and Justice Rebecca Dallet to recuse themselves; on April 23, they said they would not.

== Federal pardons ==
On November 9, 2025, President Trump issued federal pardons to 77 individuals involved in the effort to create fraudulent elector credentials, including the three defendants in this case. The federal pardons have no practical bearing on this state-level prosecution.

== See also ==
- Attempts to overturn the 2020 United States presidential election
  - Post-election lawsuits related to the 2020 U.S. presidential election from Wisconsin
  - Trump fake electors plot
- Michigan prosecution of fake electors
- Georgia election racketeering prosecution
- Nevada prosecution of fake electors
- Arizona prosecution of fake electors
