= Jim Troupis =

American attorney

Wisconsin Circuit Judge for the Dane Circuit, Branch 3
- In office June 30, 2015 – May 2, 2016
- Appointed by: Scott Walker
- Preceded by: John C. Albert
- Succeeded by: Valerie L. Bailey-Rihn

Mayor of Mendota, Illinois
- In office 1985–1987

Personal details
- Born: September 30, 1953 (age 72) Mendota, Illinois, U.S.
- Party: Republican
- Spouse: Karen
- Children: 3
- Parent: Christ Troupis Sr. (father)
- Education: Northwestern University; Northwestern University School of Law
- Profession: Lawyer

James Roberts Troupis (born September 30, 1953) is an American lawyer and Republican political operative from Dane County, Wisconsin. He was an attorney for Donald Trump's 2020 presidential campaign, and was involved in the efforts to overturn the election results, including the plan to produce fraudulent electoral votes to supplant the legitimate electoral votes at the January 6 certification. As a result of his involvement in the fraudulent elector plot, he has been charged with conspiracy to utter as legitimate a forged document.

He was also a member of Wisconsin's Judicial Conduct Advisory Committee from 2021 until 2024, when he was suspended due to his indictment. Earlier, he served one year as a Wisconsin circuit court judge in Dane County (2015–2016) and was mayor of Mendota, Illinois (1985–1987).

== Early life and career ==
James Troupis was born in 1953 and raised in Mendota, Illinois. During Jim's childhood, his father was mayor of the city. He earned his bachelor's degree from Northwestern University, then immediately continued his education at the Northwestern University School of Law, earning his J.D. in 1978. While attending law school, he was editor-in-chief of the Journal of Criminal Law & Criminology and clerked for Howard C. Ryan, then a justice of the Illinois Supreme Court. From 1979 to 1987, he practiced law in Mendota in partnership with his father, in a law firm known as Troupis & Troupis.

He became involved in Republican politics during these years. He was elected mayor of Mendota in 1985, and was director of state representative Judy Koehler's campaign for United States Senate in 1986. Koehler lost in the general election. The following year, Troupis moved to Dane County, Wisconsin, where he became a partner in the law firm Michael Best & Friedrich LLP. He remained at that firm until 2010, handling significant corporate litigation. After 2010, he practiced in his own law firm, the Troupis Law Office.

== Republican Party legal advocacy ==
Shortly after moving to Wisconsin, Troupis became a prominent lawyer for the Republican Party of Wisconsin. He was one of the lead attorneys for the Republican Party in 1992 litigation over redistricting, culminating in the federal court case Prosser v. Wisconsin State Elections Board, 793 F. Supp. 859 (1992). The named plaintiff in that case was Troupis' client, David Prosser Jr., then the Republican minority leader in the Wisconsin State Assembly.

In 2001, Troupis applied for appointment to a newly created federal judgeship in the United States District Court for the Eastern District of Wisconsin. That appointment ultimately went to William C. Griesbach. Troupis again represented Republican legislators in litigation for the 2000 redistricting cycle. In this cycle, he petitioned for the Wisconsin Supreme Court to take jurisdiction over the redistricting case, hoping this time to avoid a map drawn by the federal court. In the case of Jensen v. Wisconsin State Elections Board, 249 Wis. 2d 706 (2002), the Wisconsin Supreme Court declined the case in a per curiam opinion. The maps were eventually redrawn by a federal court panel, in the case Baumgart v. Wendelberger.

Through the following decade, Troupis was involved in more litigation on behalf of the state Republican Party. He represented state senator Joe Leibham in a recount of his senate election in 2002. Leibham sought federal intervention to set uniform counting standards, and prevailed by 46 votes.

In 2007, Troupis represented recently elected conservative Wisconsin Supreme Court justice Annette Ziegler after she was accused of violating the state code of judicial ethics. In her ten years as a circuit judge, Ziegler had ruled on more than 30 cases in which she or her husband had a direct financial interest. Ziegler settled the case with the state Ethics Board for $17,000, and Troupis then represented her at a hearing before three state Court of Appeals judges assigned to adjudicate the ethics complaint. Troupis reassured the judges that she would not make that mistake again. The panel ultimately recommended a reprimand; the Wisconsin Supreme Court then voted to reprimand her in a 5–1 decision.

In 2008, Troupis represented the state Republican Party as an intervenor in the state Attorney General's lawsuit to force the state elections board to implement more strict voter identification rules before the 2008 United States presidential election. The lawsuit was dismissed in October 2008.

The next year, he represented former state Veterans Affairs Secretary John Scocos in a lawsuit against the state Veterans Affairs Board over his firing. Discovery in the lawsuit revealed that the board had agreed to fire him a week before taking action and had coordinated their communications with the governor's office, technically a violation of the state open meetings laws.

In 2011, Troupis represented David Prosser again. The former Assembly speaker was, by then, a justice of the Wisconsin Supreme Court. After a narrow re-election victory in April 2010, Prosser retained Troupis as legal counsel to handle any challenges arising from the close election. At the same time, Troupis was involved in litigation before the state Supreme Court. He was then representing Tea Party groups which sought to strike down new state campaign finance rules.

In 2011 and 2012, Troupis was deeply involved in supporting the new Republican state government which had been elected in 2010. He was retained by Senate majority leader Scott Fitzgerald in the midst of the controversy over the "budget repair" bill. After Democratic state senators fled the state to deny a quorum for that bill, Troupis advised Fitzgerald on legal remedies to try to force them to return. But his primary business in that legislative session was, again, the redistricting process. For the first time in decades, Republicans held full control of state government for redistricting; the map they passed became infamous as one of the most dramatic gerrymanders in American history. Troupis worked on the legal strategy around crafting, passing, and defending the map. He coordinated an unprecedented non-disclosure process in which nearly all of the state's Republican lawmakers signed an agreement not to comment on the redistricting plan before the maps were released. Litigation followed the passage of the maps. In the case, Baldus v. Members of the Wisconsin Government Accountability Board, Troupis tried unsuccessfully to avoid being deposed, asserting attorney-client privilege over the redistricting process. The case ultimately led to minor revisions in the map.

In 2015, Governor Scott Walker appointed Troupis to serve as a Wisconsin circuit court judge in Dane County. Shortly after taking office, Troupis announced he would not run for election to a full term in the overwhelmingly Democratic county. Following the sudden death of Wisconsin Supreme Court justice N. Patrick Crooks in October 2015, Troupis sought appointment to succeed him. That position ultimately went to Walker ally Rebecca Bradley. The following April, Troupis' longtime ally David Prosser announced he would retire from the Wisconsin Supreme Court in the middle of his term. Troupis again sought appointment, and ultimately resigned his judgeship in May 2016 while pursuing the position. Troupis was passed over again, as Walker appointed attorney Daniel Kelly.

In 2021, at the urging of chief justice Annette Ziegler, Troupis' former client, the Wisconsin Supreme Court voted to appoint him to the state Judicial Conduct Advisory Committee. That committee provides informal advisory opinions to state judges on compliance with the code of judicial conduct.

=== Trump campaign and indictment ===
Days after the 2020 United States presidential election, Troupis began working on behalf of Donald Trump and his campaign's efforts to challenge the results in Wisconsin, where the unofficial tally then showed Trump losing the state by about 21,000 votes. He initially represented the campaign in a recount effort, but it resulted in almost no change to the election outcome. He also participated in litigation to the Wisconsin Supreme Court, which was also unsuccessful.

On November 18, 2020, Trump attorney Kenneth Chesebro emailed Troupis and other lawyers for the Trump campaign a memo in which he advocated that Trump's Wisconsin electoral slate should meet and produce alternate electoral paperwork which could possibly be used to replace or nullify the official Wisconsin electoral votes during the January 6, 2021, counting of the electoral votes. Chesebro and Troupis continued to discuss the plan with other Trump attorneys and aides over the course of the next several weeks, as the plan was expanded from Wisconsin to other states with close election results. Rudy Giuliani and Boris Epshteyn then requested that Troupis and Chesebro draft alternate electoral certificates for Pennsylvania, Georgia, Michigan, Arizona, Nevada and New Mexico. The day before the electors prescribed meeting day, December 13, 2020, Chesebro again messaged Troupis and told him that national figures in Trump's campaign understood that this [alternate elector plan] would not be happening without Troupis having pushed for it. The Wisconsin Supreme Court ultimately ruled against Trump on December 14, the same day the electors met.

Troupis and Chesebro then flew to Washington, D.C., and met with Donald Trump at the White House. Days later, Trump made his call for a rally on the National Mall on January 6, 2021. Troupis later communicated with Wisconsin's Republican U.S. senator Ron Johnson and his chief of staff about how to get the alternate electoral documents to Vice President Mike Pence on January 6. As rioters were breaching the United States Capitol on January 6, Troupis texted Chesebro, "History is made!"

The role of Troupis and Chesebro in the fraudulent elector scheme quickly became revealed through the work of the January 6 commission. Chesebro and Troupis were sued, along with the Wisconsin false electors, by liberal legal advocacy group Law Forward, on behalf of Wisconsin's actual 2020 electors. Criminal indictments followed in 2023. Michigan Attorney General Dana Nessel announced an indictment of Michigan's fraudulent electors in June 2023. That was followed shortly thereafter by a federal indictment of Trump himself, and another by Fulton County, Georgia, district attorney Fani Willis, who indicted Trump and a range of others, including Chesebro, in a racketeering case. Chesebro reached a plea deal in that case in October 2023. In the midst of these controversies, Troupis was re-appointed to another three-year term on the Judicial Conduct Advisory Committee in 2023.

Troupis and Chesebro subsequently settled the Law Forward litigation in March 2024, turning over additional documents to the plaintiffs and agreeing not to participate in a similar scheme again.

On June 4, 2024, Troupis was indicted in Wisconsin on a single felony conspiracy charge, alongside Chesebro and Trump campaign aide Mike Roman. Subsequently, the Wisconsin Supreme Court voted to suspend Troupis from his role on the state's Judicial Conduct Advisory Committee. Regarding the Wisonsin felony conspiracy charges, on June 17, 2026, Troupis, Roman and Chesebro all pleaded not guilty.

On May 26, 2026, Troupis requested $3.2 million funds from Trump's settlement with the Internal Revenue Service. He requested these as compensation for actions taken against him by the Department of Justice during the investigation of the January 6 United States Capitol attack. He also claims to be protected from state litigation due to a presidential pardon from Trump.

== Personal life and family ==
Jim Troupis is one of five children born to Christ Troupis and his wife Marion (née Roberts). Christ Troupis was an attorney for fifty years in Mendota, Illinois, and also served as mayor of Mendota (from 1953 to 1961). Christ Troupis was also active in the Republican Party.

Jim's elder brother, Christ Jr. or "C.T." Troupis, is a prominent Republican attorney in Idaho, and was a candidate for Idaho Supreme Court and Idaho Attorney General.

Jim Troupis and his wife Karen have three adult children.

Legal offices
Preceded by John C. Albert	Wisconsin Circuit Judge for the Dane Circuit, Branch 3 June 30, 2015 – May 2, 2016	Succeeded by Valerie L. Bailey-Rihn
