= Sharpiegate =

Sharpiegate can refer to two separate controversies in the US involving Sharpie markers:

- Hurricane Dorian–Alabama controversy, about a comment made by President Trump about Hurricane Dorian
- Donald J. Trump for President v. Hobbs, alleging that Sharpies were used on some ballots, causing them to be rejected
