= Arizona prosecution of fake electors =

Criminal prosecution concerning Trump fake electors

Arizona v. Ward
- Court: Arizona Superior Court in and for the County of Maricopa
- Full case name: State of Arizona v. Kelli Ward, et al.
- Docket nos.: CR2024-006850 (93 SGJ 81)
- Charge: List of charges: Conspiracy; Forgery; Fraudulent schemes and artifices; Fraudulent schemes and practices

Case history
- Prior action: Plea bargains (pre-trial): Pellegrino: 3 years probation

Court membership
- Judge sitting: Bruce Cohen

State of Arizona v. Kelli Ward, et al. is a state criminal prosecution concerning the Trump fake electors plot in Arizona.

The eighteen defendants, including eleven Arizona Republicans and seven Donald Trump associates, are accused of producing and attempting to use a certificate of ascertainment to falsely claim Trump had won the state's electoral votes in the 2020 U.S. presidential election in Arizona. The eleven fake electors included former Arizona Republican Party chair Kelli Ward, who allegedly led ten other Republicans in signing the fraudulent certificate. Charges against one of the fake electors and one of seven Trump associates, were dropped after agreements were reached with the prosecution.

The indictment contained nine criminal counts, including felony fraud, forgery, and conspiracy.

In May 2025, a district court judge ordered the case sent back to the grand jury on due process grounds. Arizona Attorney General Kris Mayes appealed, but in June 2026, the Arizona Supreme Court denied her appeal. Mayes said she would return the case to a grand jury.

== Background ==
Joe Biden won the 2020 presidential election in Arizona, carrying the state by 10,457 votes, and gaining all of the state's eleven electoral votes. Incumbent President Donald Trump lost the election in Arizona (as well as nationally), in both the popular vote and in the electoral votes. Trump and his allies refused to accept the election results, launching an extensive and ultimately unsuccessful campaign seeking to subvert the election outcome and remain in power. Lawsuits filed by Trump and Arizona Republicans, seeking to overturn the election in Arizona, were all rejected by the courts.

On December 2, 2020, Sidney Powell filed the suit Bowyer v. Ducey on behalf of 14 people, 11 of whom went on to become fake electors. Unidentified co-conspirator Kelly Townsend was also listed as a witness in Powell's case. Powell's suit sought to decertify the election or certify Trump electors. It and its appeals were dismissed or rejected all the way up to the Supreme Court.

On December 14, 2020, Arizona's legitimate electors met to formally cast their ballots for Biden, typically a procedural formality. On the same day, the 11 Arizona fake electors—designated by the Republican Party as the slate for Trump—gathered at the Arizona Republican Party headquarters in Phoenix and signed a certificate of ascertainment falsely asserting that they were the "duly elected and qualified" electors, and purporting to cast the state's electors for Trump. The Arizona Republican Party posted video of the signing on social media, including Twitter, that day. As part of Trump's pressure campaign to overturn the election results, similar slates of "alternate" Republican Party electors cast invalid electoral votes for Trump in other swing states where Trump was defeated, namely Georgia, Michigan, and Nevada. The fake electors' certificates were sent to Congress and the National Archives, which did not accept them.

On January 5, 2021, then–House Elections Committee Chairwoman Kelly Townsend, identified as an unindicted co-conspirator in the Arizona alternate elector prosecution, introduced legislation seeking to reassign Arizona's electoral votes to Donald Trump. Townsend's involvement extended beyond legislative maneuvers; she was subpoenaed by the FBI for records of her communications with Trump campaign attorneys, including Rudy Giuliani, as well as with members of the alternate elector slate. In interviews, Townsend admitted she no longer had the phone she used during her conversations with Giuliani, but acknowledged discussing election matters with him at the time. In the days leading up to January 6, Townsend also drafted a letter to Vice President Mike Pence urging him to delay certification of the Electoral College results. Townsend argued that Arizona legislators held “plenary authority and responsibility to send the correct slate,” and defended the creation of an alternate slate of electors as a contingency in case fraud were later “discovered and found.”

In 2021, Maricopa County ballots were audited by Arizona Republican senators to search for fraud that might show Trump had won Arizona. No fraud was found, and the ballot recount actually increased Biden's margin of victory by 360 votes.

== Grand jury investigation ==
Arizona Attorney General Mark Brnovich, a Republican, did not investigate the matter; the Arizona Republic noted that Brnovich "had tried to straddle election denialism during his time in office."

Brnovich's successor, Democrat Kris Mayes (a former Republican), took office in January 2023, after winning election in 2022. She examined the fake elector scheme, initially focusing the investigation on actions in Phoenix. She publicly confirmed the existence of an investigation into the scheme in March 2023. As part of the grand jury investigation, Andy Biggs and Paul Gosar, two Trump-allied Republican congressmen who boosted Trump's attempt to subvert the election results—received subpoenas, as did other Trump associates. A witness before the grand jury told Politico that the grand jurors took an "energetic and proactive" role in questioning and appeared to have a mix of different political orientations.

In October 2023, Kenneth Chesebro began cooperating with investigators in election interference cases after he pleaded guilty in the Georgia prosecution. Arizona investigators interviewed him in December 2022. Chesebro provided information that allowed Mayes to target Trump allies from out of state who participated in the Arizona scheme.

In addition to the Georgia prosecution, Michigan and Nevada also brought charges against fake electors (see Michigan prosecution of fake electors and Nevada prosecution of fake electors), making Arizona the fourth state to bring criminal charges in connection with the Trump fake electors plot. In November 2022, in a separate case brought by the Arizona attorney general's office, a grand jury indicted Peggy Judd and Tom Crosby, both Republican county supervisors in rural Cochise County, on charges of conspiracy and interference with an election officer, for their refusal to canvass of the county's votes from the November 2022 election by the deadline.

== Indictment ==
On April 25, 2024, an Arizona grand jury in the Arizona Superior Court for Maricopa County handed up a 58-page indictment against 11 Arizona Republicans and seven top Trump aides. Each defendant was charged with nine felony counts:

- Conspiracy with others "known and/or unknown"
- Fraudulent schemes and artifices for knowingly benefiting from fraud designed for "preventing the lawful transfer of the presidency of the United States, keeping President Donald J. Trump in office against the will of Arizona voters, and depriving Arizona voters of their right to vote and have their votes counted"
- Fraudulent schemes and practices for concealing facts or making false statements related to both Trump/Pence certificates "filed by the Arizona Republican electors with the Arizona Secretary of State"
- Forgery (six counts) of Trump/Pence certificates: one filed with the Vice President of the United States, two with the Arizona Secretary of State, two with the Archivist of the United States, and one with the Chief Judge of the federal District Court for the District of Arizona

The indictment alleges that, from the day after the 2020 election, Trump allies began discussing a fake elector scheme to change the election results. This challenges a claim typically made by Republicans that the slate of pro-Trump electors was merely an "alternate" option in the event that the election results were challenged. The indictment also alleges that local Republicans in Arizona in November meanwhile tried to cast doubt on the validity of the election results, and that on November 30, 2020, Giuliani and Ellis came to Phoenix to speak to Rusty Bowers. The alleged acts fall within the approximate date range of the November 3, 2020 election through the electoral vote certification on January 6, 2021.

=== Defendants ===
==== Fake electors ====
- Tyler Bowyer, COO of Turning Point Action and at the time COO of Turning Point USA and Republican National Committee member
- Nancy Cottle, fake electors chair, VP of programs for the Arizona Federation of Republican Women
- Jake Hoffman, of Queen Creek, Republican state senator, 15th district
- Anthony Kern, Republican state senator, 27th district
- Jim Lamon, unsuccessful United States Senate candidate in 2022, chair and founder of Depcom Power
- Robert Montgomery, former Cochise County Republican Committee chair
- Samuel Moorhead, former Gila County Republican Party head
- Loraine Pellegrino, fake electors secretary, president of Ahwatukee Republican Women
- Greg Safsten, former executive director of the Arizona Republican Party
- Kelli Ward, former Arizona Republican Party chair and former state senator
- Michael Ward, Republican activist, married to Kelli Ward

==== Trump aides ====
- Christina Bobb, attorney who worked under Giuliani and later joined One America News Network and became a Republican National Committee official
- John Eastman, attorney who drafted strategy for Trump campaign on effort to subvert election outcome via a multistate fake electors scheme
- Jenna Ellis, attorney who worked under Giuliani. In October 2023, Ellis pleaded guilty in the Georgia election racketeering prosecution to a criminal offense arising from her participation in the fake electors plot in Georgia, and cooperated with prosecutors.
- Boris Epshteyn, 2020 Trump campaign aide, later took on a senior role in the 2024 Trump campaign. He has since served as a personal lawyer to the President.
- Rudy Giuliani, attorney for Trump
- Mark Meadows, Trump's chief of staff in 2020
- Mike Roman, director of Election Day operations for the 2020 Trump campaign

=== Unindicted co-conspirators ===
The indictment describes, but does not name, five unindicted co-conspirators, whom are identifiable based on the indictment's descriptions of their conduct.

1. Donald Trump
2. Kelly Townsend, Republican former state senator
3. Mark Finchem, Republican former state representative
4. Kenneth Chesebro, an architect of the scheme to send alternate electors to Congress
5. Jack Wilenchik, an Arizona attorney who worked for the Trump campaign and facilitated the vote by the fake electors

A court filing on August 5, 2024, revealed that members of the grand jury had wanted to indict Trump but that the lead prosecutor had specifically asked them not to; the prosecutor had felt uncertain that there was enough evidence to prosecute Trump successfully and because prosecuting Trump at the state level might have interfered with the federal prosecution.

== Arraignments ==
Rudy Giuliani took the longest to locate to serve the indictment; he was served on May 17 at his 80th birthday party.

On May 17, John Eastman was arrested and was the first of the defendants to be arraigned for his involvement in the plot. He "plead not guilty", stating "I had zero communications with the electors in Arizona, zero involvement in any of the election litigation in Arizona or legislative hearings." The same day, he would be released from custody without conditions.

On May 21, eleven defendants were arraigned and pleaded not guilty. They included Rudy Giuliani, Christina Bobb, and Kelli Ward. Five of these defendants, including Giuliani and Bobb, would appear virtually. Ten of these defendants would be released without bond. However, Giuliani, who for over a week evaded a court summons, was ordered to post a $10,000 bond and was also required to book himself into the custody of the Maricopa County Sheriff's Office within 30 days.

On June 7, Mark Meadows and Mike Roman were arraigned remotely and pled not guilty.

On June 18, the remaining defendants, Boris Epshteyn, Jenna Ellis, and Jim Lamon, were arraigned remotely and pled not guilty.

== Pre-trial proceedings ==
On August 26, 2024, following a hearing on whether to dismiss the case, trial judge Bruce Cohen set a trial date for the case for January 5, 2026.

Attorneys for co-defendant Mark Meadows on August 15 filed a motion to move his case to federal court, citing the Supremacy Clause as a federal defense against the charges against him. Federal district judge John Tuchi denied the motion on September 16.

The case had been set to begin trial on January 5, 2026; however, the Maricopa County Superior Court ordered the case back to the grand jury on May 19, 2025, due to the prosecution denying defendants “a substantial procedural right as guaranteed by Arizona law.” for not detailing the Electoral Count Act which is central to the defendants’ claims they were acting lawfully. The Arizona Attorney General has appealed that decision.

=== Pleas and agreements ===
On August 6, 2024, Loraine Pellegrino, one of 11 Arizona Republicans who falsely claimed to be legitimate presidential electors for Donald Trump, pled guilty to one count of filing a false instrument. The deal included 3 years of unsupervised probation and no jail time.

On August 5, 2024, Jenna Ellis reached a cooperation agreement with Attorney General Kris Mayes. Ellis signed the agreement the same day. All charges were dropped, and she must cooperate with the prosecution. The previous October, she had pleaded guilty to one felony charge in the Georgia election racketeering prosecution.

In December 2025, the Arizona Attorney General agreed to dismiss the charges against Jim Lamon in exchange for his agreement to turn over relevant emails.

== See also ==
- Attempts to overturn the 2020 United States presidential election
- Trump fake electors plot
- Michigan prosecution of fake electors
- Georgia election racketeering prosecution
- Nevada prosecution of fake electors
- Wisconsin prosecution of fake electors
