= 2020 United States presidential election in Nevada =

- November 3, 2020
- Turnout: 78.22% ▲

Nominee	Joe Biden	Donald Trump
Party	Democratic	Republican
Home state	Delaware	Florida
Running mate	Kamala Harris	Mike Pence
Electoral vote	6	0
Popular vote	703,486	669,890
Percentage	50.06%	47.67%

Biden
40–50%
50–60%
60–70%
70–80%
80–90%
90–100%
Trump
40–50%
50–60%
60–70%
70–80%
80–90%
90–100%
Tie/No data
President before election
Donald Trump
Republican
Elected President
Joe Biden
Democratic

The 2020 United States presidential election in Nevada was held on Tuesday, November 3, 2020, as part of the 2020 United States presidential election in which all 50 states plus the District of Columbia participated. Nevada voters chose electors to represent them in the Electoral College via a popular vote, pitting the Republican Party's nominee, incumbent President Donald Trump, and running mate Vice President Mike Pence against Democratic Party nominee, former Vice President Joe Biden, and his running mate California Senator Kamala Harris. Nevada has six votes in the Electoral College.

Throughout the campaign, polls of the state generally showed a Biden lead, albeit with a sometimes slender margin. Before polling day, most news organizations considered that Nevada was leaning towards Biden. Biden carried Nevada by 2.39%, a slightly smaller margin than Hillary Clinton's 2.42% in 2016, making it one of six states (along with Washington DC) in which Trump improved on his 2016 margin, likely due to Trump's improvements with Hispanic voters in 2020 compared to 2016. Biden's somewhat narrow victory in Nevada also made it his weakest victory in a state that Hillary Clinton had won in 2016, as he carried all other such states by more than 7%.

Most counties in the state of Nevada are rural and sparsely populated, and voted heavily for Trump. However, Biden won the two most populous counties, Clark and Washoe, which make up almost 89% of Nevada's population. The state's three largest cities are located in these counties: Las Vegas and Henderson in the former, and Reno in the latter. His strength in these areas was likely due to high presence of minority and union voters: Biden's strength came from heavy turnout among culinary unions in populous Clark County, anchored by Las Vegas. Biden had the backing of Culinary Union Local 226, based on right-to-work standards. Additionally, Biden was able to win about 43% and 34% of votes in the tourism-heavy Lake Tahoe areas of Carson City and Douglas County respectively, sealing his victory in the state. Nevada weighed in for this election as 2.1% more Republican than the nation-at-large.

== Caucuses ==
=== Canceled Republican caucuses ===
On September 7, 2019, the Nevada Republican Party became one of several state GOP parties to officially cancel their respective primaries and caucuses. Donald Trump's re-election campaign and GOP officials have cited the fact that Republicans canceled several state primaries when George H. W. Bush and George W. Bush sought a second term in 1992 and 2004, respectively; and Democrats scrapped some of their primaries when Bill Clinton and Barack Obama were seeking reelection in 1996 and 2012, respectively. In August 2019, the Associated Press quoted the state party spokesman, Keith Schipper, who stated it "isn't about any kind of conspiracy theory about protecting the president ... He's going to be the nominee ... This is about protecting resources to make sure that the president wins in Nevada and that Republicans up and down the ballot win in 2020."

In lieu of conducting their caucuses, the state party's governing central committee instead formally held an Alternative Presidential Preference Poll on February 22, 2020, voting by acclamation to officially bind all 25 of its national pledged delegates to Trump.

=== Democratic caucuses ===
Final alignment popular vote share by county
Sanders—30–40%
Sanders—40–50%
Sanders—60–70%
Sanders—70–80%
Buttigieg—<30%
Buttigieg—30–40%
Buttigieg—40–50%

County convention delegates won by county
Sanders—30–40%
Sanders—40–50%
Sanders—50–60%
Sanders—70–80%
Buttigieg—<30%
Buttigieg—30–40%
Buttigieg—40–50%
Steyer—<30%

Final alignment popular vote share by congressional district
Sanders—30–40%
Sanders—40–50%

2020 Nevada Democratic presidential caucuses
Candidate	First alignment		Final alignment (Note: Vote count after votes for candidates who did not get at least 15% of the vote in that precinct are reallocated to the voter's second choice.)		County convention delegates (Note: County convention delegates (CCDs) are used to calculate how many pledged national convention delegates each candidate wins statewide and in the state's four congressional districts.)		Pledged national convention delegates (Note: The number of pledged national convention delegates is determined by the number of CCDs won. However, a candidate must get both at least 15% of the total vote to get statewide delegates, and at least 15% of the vote in a congressional district to get delegates from that district. Each precinct has a certain number of CCDs and allocates them based on how many caucus goers there are for each candidate at that precinct.)
Candidate	Votes	%	Votes	%	Number	%	Pledged national convention delegates
Bernie Sanders	35,652	33.99	41,075	40.45	6,788	46.84	24
Joe Biden	18,424	17.57	19,179	18.89	2,927	20.20	9
Pete Buttigieg	16,102	15.35	17,598	17.33	2,073	14.31	3
Elizabeth Warren	13,438	12.81	11,703	11.53	1,406	9.70	
Tom Steyer	9,503	9.06	4,120	4.06	682	4.71	
Amy Klobuchar	10,100	9.63	7,376	7.26	603	4.16	
Tulsi Gabbard	353	0.34	32	0.03	4	0.03	
Andrew Yang (withdrawn)	612	0.58	49	0.05	1	0.01	
Michael Bennet (withdrawn)	140	0.13	36	0.04	0	0.00	
Deval Patrick (withdrawn)	86	0.08	8	0.01	0	0.00	
John Delaney (withdrawn; not on the ballot)	1	0.00	0	0.00	0	0.00	
Uncommitted	472	0.45	367	0.36	7	0.05	
Total	104,883	100%	101,543	100%	14,491	100%	36

== General election ==
=== Final predictions ===
Source	Ranking
The Cook Political Report	Lean D
Inside Elections	Likely D
Sabato's Crystal Ball	Lean D
Politico	Lean D
RCP	Tossup
Niskanen	Safe D
CNN	Lean D
The Economist	Likely D
CBS News	Lean D
270towin	Lean D
ABC News	Lean D
NPR	Lean D
NBC News	Lean D
538	Likely D

=== Polling ===
==== Graphical summary ====
View source data.

==== Aggregate polls ====
Source of poll aggregation	Dates administered	Dates updated	Joe Biden Democratic	Donald Trump Republican	Other/ Undecided (Note: Calculated by taking the difference of 100% and all other candidates combined.)	Margin
270 to Win	October 16–31, 2020	November 1, 2020	49.4%	44.4%	6.2%	Biden +5.0
Real Clear Politics	October 23 – November 2, 2020	November 1, 2020	48.7%	46.3%	5.0%	Biden +2.4
FiveThirtyEight	until November 2, 2020	November 3, 2020	49.7%	44.4%	5.9%	Biden +5.3
Average			49.3%	45.0%	5.7%	Biden +4.3

==== Polls ====
Poll source	Date(s) administered	Sample size (Note: Key: A – all adults RV – registered voters LV – likely voters V – unclear)	Margin of error	Donald Trump Republican	Joe Biden Democratic	Jo Jorgensen Libertarian	Other	Undecided
Trafalgar Group	Oct 31 – Nov 2, 2020	1,024 (LV)	± 2.98%	49%	48%	1%	1% (Note: "Someone else" with 1%)	1%
SurveyMonkey/Axios	Oct 20 – Nov 2, 2020	2,366 (LV)	± 3%	49% (Note: Overlapping sample with the previous SurveyMonkey/Axios poll, but more information available regarding sample size)	49%	-	–	–
Data for Progress	Oct 27 – Nov 1, 2020	1,442 (LV)	± 2.6%	44%	51%	3%	2% (Note: "Other candidate or write-in" with 2%; Undecided with 0%)	–
Emerson College	Oct 29–31, 2020	720 (LV)	± 3.6%	47%	49%	-	4% (Note: "Someone else" with 4%)	–
Trafalgar Group	Oct 28–29, 2020	1,024 (LV)	± 2.98%	47%	49%	2%	1%	1%
Gravis Marketing	Oct 27–28, 2020	688 (LV)	± 3.7%	44%	50%	–	–	6%
SurveyMonkey/Axios	Oct 1–28, 2020	3,333 (LV)	–	49%	50%	-	–	–
Siena College/NYT Upshot	Oct 23–26, 2020	809 (LV)	± 3.8%	43%	49%	3%	2% (Note: "Someone else" and would not vote with 1%)	4% (Note: Includes "Refused")
BUSR/University of Nevada	Oct 16–21, Oct 23, 2020	809 (LV)	± 4%	41%	50%	–	–	–
Civiqs/Daily Kos	Oct 17–20, 2020	712 (LV)	± 5.3%	43%	52%	-	3% (Note: "Someone else" with 3%)	1%
WPA Intelligence/Las Vegas Review-Journal/AARP	Oct 7–11, 2020	512 (LV)	± 4.4%	42%	44%	3%	5% (Note: "None of these candidates" with 4%; Blankenship (C) with 1%)	6%
YouGov/CBS	Oct 6–9, 2020	1,036 (LV)	± 4.1%	46%	52%	-	2% (Note: "Other third party" with 2%)	0%
Siena College/NYT Upshot	Oct 2–6, 2020	660 (LV)	± 4.3%	42%	48%	3%	1% (Note: "Someone else" with 1%; would not vote with 0%)	6%
SurveyMonkey/Axios	Sep 1–30, 2020	1,239 (LV)	–	47%	51%	-	-	2%
Pulse Opinion Research/Rasmussen Reports/American Greatness PAC (Note: The Center for American Greatness is a pro-Trump organization)	Sep 23–25, 2020	750 (LV)	–	48%	49%	-	2% (Note: "Some other candidate" with 2%)	1%
Qualtrics/University of Nevada/BUSR	Sep 10–25, 2020	641 (LV)	± 4%	41%	46%	-	7% (Note: "Another candidate" with 4%; "None of the candidates" with 3%)	6%
Fox News	Sep 20–23, 2020	810 (LV)	± 3%	41%	52%	3%	2% (Note: "Other" with 2%; would not vote with no voters)	2%
Fox News	Sep 20–23, 2020	911 (RV)	± 3%	40%	50%	3%	3% (Note: "Other" with 2%; would not vote with 1%)	4%
ALG Research/ALG Research/The Nevada Independent (D) (Note: Sponsored by an anonymous partisan group but not the Biden campaign)	Sep 15–21, 2020	800 (LV)	± 3.5%	43%	47%	–	–	–
Siena College/NYT Upshot	Sep 8–10, 2020	462 (LV)	± 5.3%	42%	46%	3%	1% (Note: "Someone else" with 1%; would not vote and Hawkins (G) with 0%)	7%
SurveyMonkey/Axios	Aug 1–31, 2020	998 (LV)	–	49%	50%	-	–	1%
Qualtrics/University of Nevada/BUSR	Aug 20–30, 2020	682 (LV)	± 4%	39%	44%	–	5% (Note: "Someone else" with 5%)	12%
SurveyMonkey/Axios	Jul 1–31, 2020	1,021 (LV)	–	52%	47%	-	-	2%
SurveyMonkey/Axios	Jun 8–30, 2020	609 (LV)	–	49%	50%	-	-	1%
ALG Research/ALG Research/The Nevada Independent (D) (Note: Sponsored by an anonymous partisan group)	Apr 27–30, 2020	763 (LV)	± 3.6%	45%	49%	–	–	–
AtlasIntel	Feb 19–21, 2020	1,100 (RV)	± 3.0%	41%	44%	–	15%	–
FOX News	Jan 5–8, 2020	1,505 (RV)	± 2.5%	39%	47%	–	9% (Note: Other with 5%; would not vote with 4%)	4%
FOX News	Nov 10–13, 2019	1,506 (RV)	± 2.5%	40%	47%	–	9%	4%
Emerson College	Oct 31 – Nov 2, 2019	1,089 (RV)	± 2.9%	51%	49%	–	–	–
Gravis Marketing	Aug 14–16, 2019	926 (RV)	± 3.2%	43%	49%	–	–	8%
Emerson College	Mar 28–30, 2019	719 (RV)	± 3.6%	48%	52%	–	–	–

Hypothetical polling

Donald Trump vs. Bernie Sanders

Poll source	Date(s) administered	Sample size	Margin of error	Donald Trump (R)	Bernie Sanders (D)	Other	Undecided
AtlasIntel	Feb 19–21, 2020	1,100 (RV)	± 3.0%	41%	52%	7%	–
FOX News	Jan 5–8, 2020	1,505 (RV)	± 2.5%	41%	46%	8% (Note: Other with 5%; would not vote with 3%)	4%
FOX News	Nov 10–13, 2019	1,506 (RV)	± 2.5%	40%	47%	9% (Note: Other with 6%; would not vote with 3%)	4%
Emerson College	Oct 31 – Nov 2, 2019	1,089 (RV)	± 2.9%	50%	50%	–	–
Gravis Marketing	Aug 14–16, 2019	926 (RV)	± 3.2%	44%	47%	–	8%
Emerson College	Mar 28–30, 2019	719 (RV)	± 3.6%	51%	49%	–	–

Donald Trump vs. Elizabeth Warren

Poll source	Date(s) administered	Sample size	Margin of error	Donald Trump (R)	Elizabeth Warren (D)	Other	Undecided
AtlasIntel	Feb 19–21, 2020	1,100 (RV)	± 3.0%	41%	48%	12%	-
FOX News	Jan 5–8, 2020	1,505 (RV)	± 2.5%	42%	43%	10% (Note: Other with 6%; would not vote with 4%)	5%
FOX News	Nov 10–13, 2019	1,506 (RV)	± 2.5%	41%	44%	10%	5%
Emerson College	Oct 31 – Nov 2, 2019	1,089 (RV)	± 2.9%	51%	49%	–	–
Gravis Marketing	Aug 14–16, 2019	926 (RV)	± 3.2%	47%	46%	–	7%
Emerson College	Mar 28–30, 2019	719 (RV)	± 3.6%	54%	46%	–	–

Donald Trump vs. Pete Buttigieg

Poll source	Date(s) administered	Sample size	Margin of error	Donald Trump (R)	Pete Buttigieg (D)	Other	Undecided
AtlasIntel	Feb 19–21, 2020	1,100 (RV)	± 3.0%	38%	49%	14%	-
FOX News	Jan 5–8, 2020	1,505 (RV)	± 2.5%	40%	41%	12% (Note: Other with 8%; would not vote with 4%)	7%
FOX News	Nov 10–13, 2019	1,506 (RV)	± 2.5%	41%	41%	9%	6%
Gravis Marketing	Aug 14–16, 2019	926 (RV)	± 3.2%	46%	42%	–	12%
Emerson College	Mar 28–30, 2019	719 (RV)	± 3.6%	52%	48%	–	–

Donald Trump vs. Cory Booker

Poll source	Date(s) administered	Sample size	Margin of error	Donald Trump (R)	Cory Booker (D)	Undecided
Gravis Marketing	Aug 14–16, 2019	926 (RV)	± 3.2%	46%	44%	10%

Donald Trump vs. Marianne Williamson

Poll source	Date(s) administered	Sample size	Margin of error	Donald Trump (R)	Marianne Williamson (D)	Undecided
Gravis Marketing	Aug 14–16, 2019	926 (RV)	± 3.2%	48%	40%	12%

Donald Trump vs. Kamala Harris

Poll source	Date(s) administered	Sample size	Margin of error	Donald Trump (R)	Kamala Harris (D)	Undecided
Gravis Marketing	Aug 14–16, 2019	926 (RV)	± 3.2%	45%	45%	11%
Emerson College	Mar 28–30, 2019	719 (RV)	± 3.6%	51%	49%	–

Donald Trump vs Generic Democrat vs Howard Schultz

Poll source	Date(s) administered	Sample size	Margin of error	Donald Trump (R)	Generic Democrat	Howard Schultz (I)	Undecided
DFM Research	Jan 28–31, 2019	500 (V)	± 4.4%	38%	45%	6%	11%

=== Results ===
2020 United States presidential election in Nevada
Party	Candidate	Votes	%	±%
Democratic	Joe Biden Kamala Harris	703,486	50.06%	+2.14%
Republican	Donald Trump (incumbent) Mike Pence (incumbent)	669,890	47.67%	+2.17%
Libertarian	Jo Jorgensen Spike Cohen	14,783	1.05%	−2.24%
None of These Candidates		14,079	1.00%	−1.54%
Independent American	Don Blankenship William Mohr	3,138	0.22%	n/a
Total votes		1,405,376	100.00%	

==== By county ====
County	Joe Biden Democratic		Donald Trump Republican		Various candidates Other parties		Margin		Total votes cast
County	#	%	#	%	#	%	#	%	Total votes cast
Carson City	12,735	42.82%	16,113	54.18%	891	3.00%	-3,378	-11.36%	29,739
Churchill	3,051	23.67%	9,372	72.71%	467	3.62%	-6,321	-49.04%	12,890
Clark	521,852	53.66%	430,930	44.31%	19,728	2.03%	90,922	9.35%	972,510
Douglas	11,571	33.91%	21,630	63.38%	924	2.71%	-10,059	-29.47%	34,125
Elko	4,557	20.74%	16,741	76.21%	669	3.05%	-12,184	-55.47%	21,967
Esmeralda	74	15.20%	400	82.14%	13	2.66%	-326	-66.94%	487
Eureka	105	10.32%	895	88.00%	17	1.68%	-790	-77.68%	1,017
Humboldt	1,689	21.73%	5,877	75.63%	205	2.64%	-4,188	-53.90%	7,771
Lander	496	17.94%	2,198	79.49%	71	2.57%	-1,702	-61.55%	2,765
Lincoln	330	13.49%	2,067	84.51%	49	2.00%	-1,737	-71.02%	2,446
Lyon	8,473	28.02%	20,914	69.16%	851	2.82%	-12,441	-41.14%	30,238
Mineral	829	35.50%	1,423	60.94%	83	3.56%	-594	-25.44%	2,335
Nye	7,288	28.72%	17,528	69.07%	562	2.21%	-10,240	-40.35%	25,378
Pershing	547	23.58%	1,731	74.61%	42	1.81%	-1,184	-51.03%	2,320
Storey	902	31.35%	1,908	66.32%	67	2.33%	-1,096	-34.97%	2,877
Washoe	128,128	50.82%	116,760	46.31%	7,254	2.87%	11,368	4.51%	252,142
White Pine	859	19.66%	3,403	77.89%	107	2.45%	-2,544	-58.23%	4,369
Totals	703,486	50.06%	669,890	47.67%	32,000	2.27%	33,596	2.39%	1,405,376

==== By congressional district ====
Biden won three of the state's four congressional districts.

District	Trump	Biden	Representative
1st	36%	61%	Dina Titus
2nd	54%	44%	Mark Amodei
3rd	48.9%	49.1%	Susie Lee
4th	47%	51%	Steven Horsford

== Analysis ==
Given the outcome of the election in other states, Nevada became a crucial swing state to determine whether Joe Biden or Donald Trump would win the 2020 presidential election. With Biden's win, this would mark the fourth presidential election in a row that Nevada has voted Democratic, although this is the first time since the beginning of the Democratic winning streak in Nevada that the state was more Republican than the nation, the last time being 2004, when incumbent George W. Bush carried the state by 2.6% and won the national popular vote by 2.4%. Nevada was the state that came closest to flipping from blue to red in 2020.

The COVID-19 pandemic in particular had a strong effect on Nevada, as the pandemic negatively affected gambling and tourism, which the state's economy relies on. 22% of voters regarded the pandemic as the most important issue of the election, and these voters broke for Biden by 73 points.

Most counties in the state of Nevada are rural, and have voted Republican since 1980. As a whole, the rural counties outside of Las Vegas and Reno made up much of Trump's total. The state's two most populous counties, Clark County and Washoe County, which contain over 89% of the state's population, broke for Biden. Trump was able to narrow the Democratic margin in Clark to 9.35%, compared to 10.71% in 2016, winning 44.31% of the vote in the county. Outside of Clark and Reno, Biden's strongest performances would be in the Lake Tahoe areas of Carson City and Douglas County; while these areas are more rural and Republican-leaning, they are also reliant on both the gambling and tourism industries. Biden hit nearly 43% in Carson City, and received 33% of the vote in Douglas County—this totaled to more than 24,000 votes, effectively clinching the state for Biden.

Nevada was one of seven states and DC where Trump received a larger percentage of the two-party vote than he did in 2016. (Note: The other six states were Arkansas, Florida, Hawaii, California, Utah, and Illinois.) Nevada received enhanced attention because of the delay in its finalization of results compared to most other battleground states. Three days before the state was called, the electoral map showed Biden at 264 electoral votes while having a narrow lead in Nevada, with Trump having a lead in the remaining uncalled swing states. Had the state been called for Biden sooner, its six electors would have increased his electoral vote count exactly to the required 270 to win the presidency. The delay in Nevada's results became an internet meme before the state was projected for Biden on November 7.

=== Latino voters ===
Latinos were critical to Biden's victory in Nevada, particularly Latinos of Mexican heritage. Latino membership in the Culinary Workers Union was a key driver of Democratic dominance in the state, with over 60,000 (mostly Latino) members who work in the Las Vegas casino, hotel, and service industries, as well as other tourism industries.

=== Voter demographics ===
2020 presidential election in Nevada by demographic subgroup (Edison exit polling)
Demographic subgroup	Biden	Trump	% of total vote
Total vote	50	48	98
Ideology
Liberals	89	9	26
Moderates	61	37	37
Conservatives	12	85	38
Party
Democrats	95	5	35
Republicans	5	94	35
Independents	50	44	30
Gender
Men	46	51	48
Women	54	44	52
Race/ethnicity
White	43	56	65
Black	80	18	7
Latino	61	35	17
Asian	64	35	5
Other	42	54	5
Age
18–24 years old	69	26	9
25–29 years old	52	45	5
30–39 years old	59	39	17
40–49 years old	49	48	14
50–64 years old	41	57	24
65 and older	46	53	30
Sexual orientation
LGBT	80	16	7
Heterosexual	47	51	93
First-time voter
Yes	55	43	10
No	50	48	90
Education
High school or less	49	48	19
Some college education	46	52	35
Associate degree	52	46	14
Bachelor's degree	48	48	20
Postgraduate degree	60	38	12
Income
Under $30,000	63	35	17
$30,000–49,999	50	44	20
$50,000–99,999	50	49	33
$100,000–199,999	41	57	24
Over $200,000	52	47	6
Union households
Yes	58	39	19
No	48	50	81
Military service
Veterans	29	70	17
Non-veterans	54	44	83
Issue regarded as most important
Racial inequality	90	8	14
Coronavirus	85	12	22
Economy	11	87	36
Crime and safety	11	88	10
Health care	84	14	11
Region
Washoe County	51	47	18
Clark County	54	44	69
Rest of the state	30	68	13
Area type
Urban	52	46	71
Suburban	58	41	16
Rural	30	68	13
Family's financial situation today
Better than four years ago	14	84	35
Worse than four years ago	85	11	25
About the same	60	38	39

== Aftermath ==
On November 5, the Nevada Republican Party alleged "at least 3,062 instances of voter fraud". Republican lawyers released a list of over 3,000 people who allegedly did not live in Clark County, Nevada, when they voted. However, these were not proven to be illegal votes, because Nevada (a) allows for people who moved states 30 days before the election to vote in Nevada's election, and (b) allows people studying in colleges in another state to vote in Nevada's election. Additionally, the list featured military members who were overseas and voted by mail.

On November 17, representatives of the Trump campaign asked a judge to nullify Biden's 33,596-vote margin, and simply declare Trump the winner and his electors elected. However, on November 24, the Nevada Supreme Court certified Biden as the winner of the state.

In December 2023, six Republicans were indicted for their alleged role in the fake elector scheme.

== See also ==
- United States presidential elections in Nevada
- 2020 Nevada elections
- 2020 United States presidential election
- 2020 Democratic Party presidential primaries
- 2020 Republican Party presidential primaries
- 2020 United States elections

== Notes ==
Partisan clients
