= Protect Democracy =

American non-profit organization

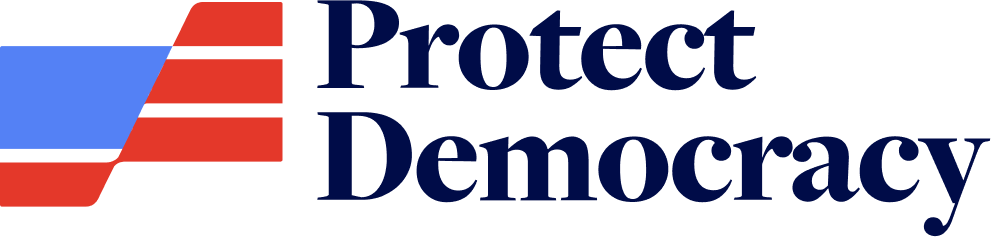
- Formation: November 2016
- Founder: Ian Bassin; Justin Florence; Emily Loeb
- Type: 501(c) nonprofit organization
- Purpose: Anti-authoritarianism advocacy
- Region served: United States
- Executive Director: Ian Bassin
- Website: protectdemocracy.org

Protect Democracy is a nonprofit organization based in the United States. A nonpartisan group, Protect Democracy seeks to check what it believes are authoritarian attacks on U.S. democracy.

Protect Democracy states that it seeks to use litigation, legislative and communications strategies, technology, research, and analysis to stand up for free and fair elections, the rule of law, fact-based debate, and a better democracy for future generations. According to Time Magazine, the group is a "defender of America's system of government against the threat of authoritarianism."

In 2023, Protect Democracy was named as one of five winners of the 2023 Skoll Award for Social Innovation by the Skoll Foundation.

== Leadership ==
In 2016, Protect Democracy was co-founded by Ian Bassin, Justin Florence, and Emily Loeb, who served as lawyers in the White House Counsel’s Office under former President Barack Obama. In forming the organization, Protect Democracy's founders consulted with political scientists who later became members of the group's board of advisers, including Harvard University political scientists Steven Levitsky and Daniel Ziblatt.

Bassin, a former White House associate counsel, serves as the executive director of Protect Democracy. He was named a "MacArthur genius" in 2023. The following year, Bassin and Florence were named to the Time 100 Next list in an article written by John Dean, former White House Counsel to Richard Nixon.

== Activities ==
=== Defending free and fair elections ===
Protect Democracy has pushed back on efforts to impinge the right to vote. In 2022, the group filed a lawsuit against individuals and organizations conspiring to intimidate Arizona voters who were using drop boxes to deliver their ballots in the 2022 election. Days later, a federal court issued an order barring the defendants in the case from confronting, photographing, and doxing voters, in addition to carrying guns and wearing body armor near drop boxes.

In 2023, Protect Democracy was one of the groups that filed a lawsuit challenging Virginia’s lifetime ban on voting for anyone convicted of any felony. The suit argues that Virginia’s disenfranchisement provision violates a little-known federal law: The Virginia Readmission Act, a Reconstruction-era statute designed to protect the newly-enshrined rights, including the right to vote, of formerly enslaved citizens.

After the 2024 election, Protect Democracy represented a group of North Carolina voters who had their votes invalidated in a closely contested Supreme Court race. The invalidation of their votes was ultimately overturned, and Democrat Allison Riggs (who narrowly won the election) assumed the seat.

Protect Democracy also filed a lawsuit challenging the Justice Department's attempt to build a national voter database ahead of the 2026 midterm elections. The database would have arrogated new supervision over elections to the federal government.

In August 2026, the group represented various localities in a lawsuit over the Department of Homeland Security's (DHS) attempts to withhold anti-terrorism funding unless states changed the rules governing their elections.

=== Preventing executive abuses of power ===
Protect Democracy represented El Paso County, Texas and the Border Network for Human Rights in a 2019 lawsuit, alleging that Trump’s declaration of a national emergency to build a wall on the southern border violated federal statutes, including the National Emergencies Act and Consolidated Appropriations Act. The lawsuit was ultimately rendered moot by the Supreme Court after changes in policy under the Biden administration.

The group has written amicus briefs focused on executive overreach in relation to two of the Supreme Court’s cases involving deliberations over presidential emergency powers: A Trump administration migration restriction in Arizona v. Mayorkas and the Biden administration’s student debt cancellation program in Biden v. Nebraska. The group argued that both cases together represented an opportunity to “[propose] a standard for how the Court should consider challenges to executive actions based on congressional delegations of emergency powers.”

In 2025, Protect Democracy filed a lawsuit in response to the tactics used as part of "Operation Midway Blitz", the Trump administration's deployment of federal agents in Chicago, Illinois. In response, a federal judge issued a temporary injunction, saying that the use of force by federal agents "shocks the conscience."

That same year, the group sued the National Institutes of Health and the Department of Health and Human Services, arguing that over $1 billion in research grant cuts had been canceled illegally. A federal judge ruled in June 2025 that the cuts were illegal.

Following the use of tear gas at protests outside an ICE facility in Portland, Oregon, Protect Democracy sued DHS on behalf of residents of the adjacent Gray’s Landing affordable housing complex. The lawsuit claimed that the constitutional rights of the residents were violated by the indiscriminate use of chemical munitions, posing a health and safety risk to more than 2,000 people. In March 2026, a judge ordered federal agents to curb the use of such munitions.

In a separate lawsuit, the group sued DHS over its policy of warrantless home entry, arguing it violates the Fourth Amendment.

=== Accountability of candidates and elected officials ===
Protect Democracy advocates for maintaining a strong separation between the White House and the Justice Department. In 2020, the group collected letters from hundreds of DOJ alumni, calling for former Attorney General William Barr to step down. The DOJ alumni also claimed the Mueller report presented enough evidence to charge former President Donald Trump with obstruction of justice.

Protect Democracy has criticized both Democrats and Republicans over resisting congressional oversight. In 2021, the group represented 66 former members of Congress, including two dozen Republicans, challenging Trump’s efforts to block the January 6th Select Committee from accessing his presidential records. During the 2020 election, Bassin urged then-candidate Joe Biden to reverse course after declaring he would defy a subpoena if called to testify in Trump’s first impeachment. Biden eventually backed off his comments.

Following the January 6th Capitol riots, Protect Democracy represented Capitol Police officers suing Trump under the Klan Act for his role in inciting the crowd. In February 2022, the Court denied Trump’s motion to dismiss the case. In an amicus brief filed in the case, the DOJ rejected Trump’s claim to have blanket immunity from civil liability for his conduct in office. In December 2023, a three-judge panel of the D.C. Circuit ruled that Trump was not immune from prosecution for his actions on January 6.

Protect Democracy also represented Lt. Col. Alexander Vindman in a case against former Trump aides and allies, accusing them of intimidating and retaliating against him for testifying against Trump during his first impeachment.

The group sued the 2016 Trump campaign on behalf of Jessica Denson, a former Trump campaign staffer, in an attempt to invalidate the non-disclosure agreements (NDAs) that she and other staffers were made to sign. Denson got her own NDA overturned in 2021, and two years later, a judge ruled that her victory extends to all who signed the NDA.

=== Work to maintain a nonpartisan civil service ===
Protect Democracy represented the Federal Trade Commission's Kelly Slaughter in a 2025 case over whether the president is allowed to fire members of an independent commission created by Congress. The Supreme Court agreed to hear arguments in the case.

The group was also part of a lawsuit on behalf of a coalition of labor unions, nonprofit organizations, and local governments in which they argued that the Trump administration's mass firings (known as "RIFs) of the federal workforce were illegal. The preliminary injunction that the plaintiffs won paused dozens of RIFs across several agencies.

In another lawsuit, Protect Democracy sued the Office of Personnel Management over its 2025 "Merit Hiring Plan," which included a specific question focused on alignment with President Trump's policy priorities. The suit argued that the question violates the First Amendment.

=== First Amendment work ===
Protect Democracy’s litigation has advocated on behalf of First Amendment rights. In 2019, the organization filed a lawsuit on behalf of Reverend Kaji Douša, challenging a previously secret DHS surveillance operation that targeted activists, journalists, lawyers, and faith leaders, all of whom spoke out against the Trump administration. In 2023, a federal judge in California ruled that U.S. Customs and Border Protection and the DHS violated Douša’s rights by retaliating against her for ministering to migrants and refugees.

In another 2023 lawsuit filed on behalf of Penguin Random House, PEN America, and individuals in Florida, Protect Democracy worked with Ballard Spahr to challenge the constitutionality of the Escambia County School District’s removal and restriction of books discussing race, racism, or LGBTQ issues from public school libraries.

A third lawsuit, filed on behalf of several businesses in Florida, challenged the state’s Stop WOKE Act. In March 2024, a three-judge panel of the 11th U.S. Circuit of Appeals upheld a lower court’s injunction blocking enforcement of the law, ruling that Florida businesses' speech rights were improperly restricted.

In 2025, the group worked with Tech Freedom to file a petition on behalf of seven former Federal Communications Commission (FCC) chairs and board members advocating for the revocation of the "news distortion" policy. In the petition, the FCC members argued that “the current leadership of the Commission is abusing the news distortion policy to directly advance the interests of the White House.”

In 2026, Protect Democracy filed a lawsuit on behalf of Maine residents against DHS agents for surveilling and intimidating people who lawfully observed and recorded immigration operations. The agents allegedly threatened to add observers to a "domestic terrorism" database.

=== Law for Truth ===
The group also launched "Law for Truth", which uses defamation law to impose accountability on those who spread election disinformation. Law for Truth has brought lawsuits on behalf of Ruby Freeman and Wandrea' ArShaye Moss, two election workers in Georgia, and a postmaster in Pennsylvania, who suffered online and offline threats to their safety due to false media stories about their alleged involvement in election fraud. Freeman and Moss, who sued One America News Network, Rudy Giuliani and The Gateway Pundit, were awarded the Presidential Citizens Medal for their defense of the 2020 election.

In July 2023, Giuliani conceded that the statements he made about Freeman and Moss were false. In December of that year, a federal court ordered Giuliani to pay Freeman and Moss $148 million in compensatory and punitive damages.

Protect Democracy's case representing Robert Weisenbach, the Republican postmaster in Pennsylvania, was settled out of court by Project Veritas and James O'Keefe. In another lawsuit, the group represents Maricopa County Recorder Stephen Richer, who sued former Arizona gubernatorial candidate Kari Lake for defamation over claims she made about Richer’s role in the 2022 Arizona gubernatorial election. In 2024, Richer and Lake reached a private settlement in the case.

The group also sued the makers and promoters of the film 2,000 Mules, representing Mark Andrews, a voter who legally placed his ballot and those of his family into a dropbox ahead of the 2020 election. In May 2024, Salem Media Group (one of the parties being sued) issued a statement apologizing to Andrews and announcing that Salem had removed the film from its platforms.

=== National Task Force on Election Crises ===
In 2019, Protect Democracy also convened the nonpartisan "National Task Force on Election Crises," a cross-ideological group of more than 50 experts on elections, security, public health, and other areas. The Task Force issues analyses and reports, holding press briefings on how the electoral system is supposed to work for the purpose of building resiliency against efforts to subvert the electoral process.

=== Advocating recusals from elected officials running their own elections ===
Protect Democracy has challenged Republican and Democratic officials over claims that they were misusing their offices to improperly interfere in elections. In 2018, Protect Democracy sued then-Georgia Secretary of State Brian Kemp, seeking his recusal from overseeing a recount in an election in which he was also a candidate. The group also filed a lawsuit against then-Florida Governor Rick Scott, claiming the Constitution sets limits on an elected official’s ability to exercise governmental powers over their own election. Protect Democracy later challenged Mississippi Attorney General Jim Hood, a Democrat, for appearing to use his governmental position to advance his own candidacy for governor.

=== Accountability for political violence ===
Protect Democracy has filed two lawsuits aimed at deterring voter intimidation and political violence. The cases involved Biden-Harris campaigners and a bus driver who were on a campaign bus in October 2020, when they were ambushed by a “Trump Train” in Texas. One case, Davis v. Cisneros, targeted the drivers of the “Trump Train” for harassment and intimidation. The second case, Cervini v. Stapp, was filed against San Marcos law enforcement officials who allegedly failed to provide a police escort during the attack.

The city of San Marcos and three of its police officials agreed to a monetary settlement, admitting in the settlement agreement of falling short of their policing standards. In the agreement, they also committed to institute police training on responding to political violence and voter intimidation. A jury in the other case found the lead organizer of the "Trump Train" liable for using threats to prevent the Biden-Harris campaigners from engaging in political activity.

=== Electoral Count Act ===
Protect Democracy advocated for passage of the Electoral Count Act (ECA), which was passed into law in 2022. According to Washington Post columnist Greg Sargent, the group “wrote one of the earliest blueprints on how to reform [the] ECA.”

== Reports ==
=== "The Authoritarian Playbook" ===
The group has released research on "The Authoritarian Playbook", which can be used to distinguish authoritarianism from other forms of politics. This guide catalogs the seven basic tactics that are almost always present in examples of democratic backsliding around the world:

- Politicizing independent institutions
- Spreading disinformation
- Aggrandizing executive power and undermining checks & balances
- Quashing dissent
- Marginalizing vulnerable communities
- Corrupting elections
- Stoking violence

In 2024, the affiliated 501(c)(4) United to Protect Democracy issued "The Authoritarian Playbook for 2025", which details the alleged threat a second Trump administration would pose to American democracy.

=== Election-related reports ===
Protect Democracy has issued reports and policy proposals examining the links between anti-democratic extremism and the U.S. electoral system. In partnership with Interfaith America, the group also developed the "Faith in Elections Playbook", which supports faith-based communities with resources to engage in the 2024 election.

In 2024, the group issued a report on the rise of mass voter challenges, explaining how such challenges are used to disrupt the electoral process.

Ahead of the 2026 midterms, Protect Democracy released a report outlining how the president could interfere with the November elections.

=== State-level election subversion report ===
In 2021, along with the States United Democracy Center and Law Forward, Protect Democracy issued an initial report on state legislative attempts that threaten to subvert elections. It has subsequently released updates to the report.

=== Guide to identifying a politicized investigation ===
In response to the federal and state investigations against Trump, the group issued a guide seeking to tell the difference between politicized investigations and normal, appropriate efforts by law enforcement.

== Advocating for long-term reforms ==
=== "Rethinking Our Democracy" series ===
Collaborating with the University of Chicago's Center for Effective Government, Protect Democracy experts have hosted two “Rethinking Our Democracy” series in The Washington Post, proposing institutional reforms to strengthen American democracy.

=== Proportional representation ===
Protect Democracy has also advocated for reforming the U.S. system of government toward proportional representation. In 2022, the group organized a coalition of more than 200 pro-democracy scholars to advocate for abolishing single-member districts. In 2026, Protect Democracy organized an additional letter signed by more than 500 scholars, advocating for proportional representation as a solution to gerrymandering.

=== Restoring fusion voting ===
In 2024, Protect Democracy represented a group of Kansas voters who argued their third party was illegally kept off the state's general election ballot. The effort is part of a broader push in states such as Kansas to legalize so-called fusion voting, which allows more than one party to nominate the same political candidate.

== Software ==
=== VoteShield ===
Protect Democracy developed the software VoteShield, which uses publicly available data to track changes to voter rolls, identifying potentially suspicious irregularities.

=== OpenOMB ===
After Office of Management and Budget (OMB) data was made accessible to the public, Protect Democracy created OpenOMB.org, a website designed to increase access to the data. When that data was taken down in 2025, the group sued the Trump administration to have its access restored. A federal judge sided with Protect Democracy and the decision was affirmed by the U.S. Court of Appeals for the D.C. Circuit, with the OMB data ultimately restored.

== See also ==
- Democratic backsliding in the United States
- Democratization
- Efforts to overturn the 2020 U.S. Presidential election
