= Law Forward =

American non-profit organization

- Founder: Jeff Mandell and Doug Poland
- Founded at: Madison, Wisconsin
- Location: Madison, Wisconsin, United States

Law Forward is an American non-profit legal advocacy organization based in Madison, Wisconsin. Jeff Mandell and Doug Poland founded Law Forward in October 2020. Poland was notable for his role as a lead trial attorney in Gill v. Whitford, a major 2018 U.S. Supreme Court case involving the constitutionality of partisan gerrymandering.

Law Forward is currently headquartered in Madison, Wisconsin.

== History ==
Law Forward was founded by Jeff Mandell, who serves as its General Counsel and President, as well as Doug Poland, who serves as its Litigation Director.

Law Forward's original staff attorney in 2020 was Mel Barnes. In 2023, she became Chief Legal Counsel for Wisconsin Governor Tony Evers. She has written reports with Norm Eisen, Norman Ornstein, Jeff Mandell, and others.

In 2021, Law Forward requested Milwaukee County District Attorney John T. Chisholm to launch an investigation on Republicans who had sent fraudulent electoral college certifications for Donald Trump during the 2020 U.S. Presidential elections.

In January 2022, Law Forward also appealed a judge's order barring Wisconsin ballot drop boxes for the February 15 election. Another one of Law Forward's ongoing cases in 2022 seeks to reinstate voters after their registrations were deactivated.

== Issues ==
Law Forward specializes in diverse issues, including voting rights, election interference, gerrymandering, and minority voting rights. It also focuses on election administration in Wisconsin, including state-level elections and voting issues. It is also a non-partisan strategic litigation firm according to Mandell.

Since its founding, Law Forward has engaged in a series of lawsuits including:

=== Fake Electors ===
In 2022, Law Forward and co-counsel at Georgetown University Law Center’s Institute for Constitutional Advocacy and Protection (ICAP) filed a civil suit, against Wisconsinites involved in the 2020 fraudulent electors scheme, uncovering the fact that the strategy was developed in Wisconsin by attorney Jim Troupis and legal adviser Ken Chesebro before spreading across the nation. Extensive texts and messages uncovered in the discovery process can be found on the Law Forward website. Wisconsin Attorney General Josh Kaul filed multiple felony charges against the attorneys in 2024.

=== Fair Maps ===
In 2023, Law Forward, along with co-counsel Stafford Rosenbaum, Election Law Clinic at Harvard Law School, Campaign Legal Center, and Arnold & Porter, overturned gerrymandered state legislative maps in the Wisconsin Supreme Court. The Clarke v. Wisconsin Elections Commission case resulted in new maps passed by the Republican legislature, signed into law by Governor Tony Evers (D), and used for elections in 2024.

In 2025, Law Forward, along with counsel at Stafford Rosenbaum LLP and the Election Law Clinic at Harvard Law School, filed a motion to intervene in Bothfeld v. Wisconsin Elections Commission charging that Wisconsin’s Congressional maps constitute an anti-competitive gerrymander.

=== Union Rights ===
In 2024, Law Forward along with co-counsel Bredhoff & Kaiser, overturned the anti-union 2011 Wisconsin Act 10 law in Dane County Circuit Court. The law, which was enacted by former Governor Scott Walker (R), sparking mass protests in 2011, led to a crisis in teacher pay and retention and harmed the public education system, according to reports.

=== Accountability ===
In 2023, Law Forward filed a 100-page complaint to the Wisconsin Office of Lawyer Regulation (OLR), alleging that Supreme Court Justice Michael Gableman engaged in unethical and deceitful conduct during a probe into the results of the 2020 election. Gableman was appointed to an Office of Special Counsel by Wisconsin Assembly Speaker Robin Vos in 2021. Gableman was fired by Vos a year later, and the price tag for the probe reached some $2 million. In 2025, Gableman stipulated to the suspension of his law license for three years in an agreement with the Office of Lawyer Regulation.

In 2025 Law Forward, Democracy Defenders Fund, and Hecker Fink LLP filed a complaint in Dane County Circuit Court on behalf of the nonpartisan Wisconsin Democracy Campaign and a group of Wisconsin voters, alleging “that billionaire Elon Musk and groups affiliated with him violated multiple Wisconsin laws—including the election-bribery statute—during the 2025 Wisconsin Supreme Court election."

== People ==
The Legal Advisory Council at Law Forward includes former legislators, politicians, and judges.

- Hon. Russ Feingold, Former United States Senator from Wisconsin, President of the American Constitution Society, Honorary Co-Chair
- Hon. Barbara Lawton, Former Lieutenant Governor of Wisconsin, Honorary Co-Chair
- Hon. Paul Higginbotham, Former Judge for the Wisconsin Court of Appeals
- Ian Bassin, Executive Director of Protect Democracy

== Media ==
Mandell has been interviewed in various media outlets, including the Rachel Maddow Show on MSNBC, The Washington Post, The New York Times, the Milwaukee Journal Sentinel, the Associated Press and many others.
