= Clarke v. Wisconsin Elections Commission =

2023 Wisconsin Supreme Court case

- Seal of the Wisconsin Supreme Court
- Court: Wisconsin Supreme Court
- Full case name: Rebecca Clarke et al. v. Wisconsin Elections Commission et al.
- Decided: December 22, 2023

Court membership
- Judges sitting: Annette Ziegler, Chief Justice; Ann Walsh Bradley, Rebecca Bradley, Rebecca Dallet, Brian Hagedorn, Jill Karofsky, Janet Protasiewicz, Justices

Case opinions
- The existing legislative district maps were found to be unconstitutional because they failed the requirement for "contiguous territory" in Art. IV, Sec. 4, and Art. IV, Sec. 5, of the Constitution of Wisconsin.
- Majority: Karofsky, joined by A. Bradley, Dallet, Protasiewicz
- Dissent: Ziegler
- Dissent: R. Bradley
- Dissent: Hagedorn

Clarke v. Wisconsin Elections Commission was a December 2023 decision of the Wisconsin Supreme Court which struck down the state Senate and Assembly district maps of the Wisconsin Legislature. The decision held that the Constitution of Wisconsin—in sections 4 and 5 of Article IV—requires "legislative districts [to] be composed of physically adjoining territory." In a 4–3 opinion written by justice Jill Karofsky, the Court ordered new maps to be drawn ahead of the 2024 Wisconsin elections.

The remedial process completed on February 19, 2024, when Governor Tony Evers signed a new map proposal passed by the legislature. While partisan gerrymandering was not an issue the court chose to address in the lawsuit, the decision and remedy had the effect of eliminating one of the most successful partisan gerrymanders in U.S. history and replacing it with a map in which either party had a legitimate shot at legislative majorities.

== Background ==
=== Redistricting in Wisconsin ===
Redistricting in Wisconsin has become an increasingly sensitive political topic in the state. According to the Constitution of Wisconsin, redistricting is supposed to be carried out through the normal legislative process, but that process has become nearly unworkable for redistricting due to an inability to come to consensus in divided government. The last time divided government succeeded at redistricting in Wisconsin was in 1971, when a Democratic governor and assembly came to a compromise with a Republican senate. Since then, federal courts handled redistricting in 1982, 1992, and 2002, and partisan maps were implemented by one-party government in 1983 and 2011. Before the 2020 cycle, the Wisconsin Supreme Court had only handled redistricting one time, in 1964. Cases came to the Wisconsin Supreme Court in 1982, 1992, and 2002, but the state court deferred in each of those cases, since federal law and federal court procedure had better tools for handling the map-making process.

In 2011, the Republican government in Wisconsin enacted heavily gerrymandered maps, which protecting large and durable Republican majorities in the legislature regardless of swings in the state electorate. Abolishing the gerrymander became one of the top political objectives of the Democratic Party of Wisconsin, and maintaining the gerrymander became one of the top political objectives of the Republican Party of Wisconsin.

By the 2020 United States census, Wisconsin had returned to divided government, with a Democratic governor clashing with the entrenched Republican legislature. As most had expected, the divided government was unable to come to a compromise on redistricting as both sides placed their hopes in the courts. Democrats wanted federal judges to draw maps, as they had in 1982, 1992, and 2002, while Republicans hoped that the conservative majority on the Wisconsin Supreme Court would do so.

=== The Wisconsin Supreme Court ===
The Wisconsin Supreme Court is composed of seven members who are elected in statewide general elections. These elections had become increasingly politicized in the years since 2002, accelerating dramatically with the rise of big-spending Super PACs in 2010. By 2021, the court had a clear conservative ideological majority. In that environment, the conservative majority on the Wisconsin Supreme Court agreed to take on their first redistricting case in 60 years over the objections of the court's three liberal justices. Through many of the subsequent cases, the Republican arguments were largely managed by the conservative legal advocacy group Wisconsin Institute for Law and Liberty, the Democratic arguments were largely handled by progressive legal advocacy group Law Forward.

=== Johnson v. Wisconsin Elections Commission ===
As requested by the Republican Party of Wisconsin, the Wisconsin Supreme Court assumed original jurisdiction over the case Johnson v. Wisconsin Elections Commission, which would update the legislative maps to account for population changes in the 2020 census. In taking the case, the conservative majority on the court also attempted to define a standard to use in judging map proposals. Referred to commonly as "least changes", the conservative majority explained that they would seek the fewest changes necessary to bring the map into legal compliance with the new census data. This was an effort by the court to create a legal framework for their decision, since the court acknowledged that the state court lacked useful constitutional, legal, or judicial precedent to properly dispose of a redistricting case. This standard alone, however, represented a significant partisan victory for the Republicans, as the existing maps had been intentionally designed in 2011 to give partisan advantage to Republican candidates.

The previous map contained six majority-minority districts. Justice Brian Hagedorn sided with the court's three liberal justices to select Democratic Governor Tony Evers's maps, which included seven majority-minority districts. Republicans in the legislature appealed the decision to the United States Supreme Court, arguing that a seventh majority-minority district was an unconstitutional racial gerrymander. The Supreme Court struck down the maps in an unsigned opinion, remanding the case for further consideration of whether the Voting Rights Act required a seventh majority-minority district.

With the case returned to the Wisconsin Supreme Court, Hagedorn sided with the court's conservatives to adopt the Republican legislative maps, which contained five majority-minority districts. In his concurring opinion, Hagedorn acknowledged that the court did not have the proper process for adjudicating all of the complexities of a redistricting case, and that they had now run out of time to attempt to deal with those issues.

=== Changes on the court ===
In the 2022 elections, Republicans increased their already-substantial legislative majorities even as Democratic governor Tony Evers won re-election. The following spring, the 2023 Wisconsin Supreme Court election resulted in a change in the Wisconsin Supreme Court's ideological majority, when liberal circuit judge Janet Protasiewicz was elected to replace retiring conservative justice Patience Roggensack. During the campaign, Protasiewicz had expressed interest in revisiting the redistricting decision and after her victory, progressive legal advocates vowed to bring a new challenge to the 2022 maps. This led to months of controversy as legislative Republicans threatened to impeach Protasiewicz. After significant backlash, and finding little support for impeachment even among conservative former justices, legislative Republicans backed down from that threat.

The new challenge to Wisconsin's legislative maps was filed on August 2, 2023, the day after Protasiewicz was sworn in. The challenge—brought on behalf of voters Rebecca Clarke et al.—had three main complaints: (1) the maps were an unconstitutional partisan gerrymander, (2) the maps did not comply with the state constitution requirement that districts be composed of "contiguous territory", (3) the maps were created by a process which violated separation of powers. Ultimately the new liberal majority on the Wisconsin Supreme Court agreed to take the case, but they declined to evaluate issue 1, whether the maps represented an unconstitutional partisan gerrymander.

== Decision ==
Writing for the majority, Justice Jill Karofsky began her opinion by noting that a majority of districts in both chambers of the Wisconsin Legislature (50 of 99 seats in the Assembly and 20 of 33 seats in the Senate) contained non-contiguous territory. She then went on to conclude that this was a violation of the plain text of the Constitution, which states that state Assembly and Senate districts are "to consist of contiguous territory". The court therefore enjoined the use of those legislative maps for further elections and ordered new maps to be drawn.

Although the legislative maps were ruled unconstitutional, the majority declined to declare that previous elections held under those maps were unlawful, and therefore did not call for special elections in the 17 state senate districts which were not scheduled for election in 2024.

Much of the text of the majority opinion dealt with defining "contiguous" and whether that language could be seen as a binding requirement in the constitution. The majority pointed to standard modern definitions of "contiguous", which include "touching" or "in actual contact", and also looked to historical definitions which would have been common at the time of the writing of the Wisconsin Constitution, such as "meeting so as to touch; bordering upon each other; not separate".

After determining that the constitutional language referred to intact districts without separated territory, they dealt with the issue of whether or not the constitutional language made this a firm requirement or a suggested guideline. Since the constitutional language around contiguity was not modified by other qualifying language, unlike the "compactness" guidance which suggested that districts be "in as compact form as practicable" (emphasis removed), the majority determined that contiguity was a strict requirement of the constitutional language.

The opinion then examined historical precedent from earlier Wisconsin Supreme Court cases, including State ex rel. Lamb v. Cunningham (1892) (Wisconsin's first major redistricting lawsuit). The court reached a nearly identical conclusion in Lamb v. Cunningham, writing that Article IV, Section 4 "requires that each assembly district must consist of contiguous territory; that is to say, it cannot be made up of two or more pieces of detached territory." They also re-examined the recent 2022 redistricting decision Johnson v. Wisconsin Elections Commission, whose handling of contiguity relied on a reading of the 1992 federal case of Prosser v. Wisconsin Elections Board. The majority in Clarke determined that the Wisconsin Supreme Court had erred in 2022 by relying on the Prosser language, which had not examined Wisconsin case precedent on the question of contiguity.

In miscellaneous matters of contiguity, the majority opined that districts may still be contiguous if separated by a body of water, assuming that the necessary section of water were also included within the boundaries of the district. They also addressed the question of "touch-point contiguity", where separate parts of a district were joined by a single geographic point—the court ruled that touch-point contiguity, since it would be technically "touching", would not inherently violate the language of the Wisconsin constitution.

The opinion finally discussed the remedial process. They determined that since the majority of Wisconsin's legislative districts violated the contiguity requirement, the maps would need to be entirely re-drawn. The court acknowledged that this task should fall to the Legislature, but if the Legislature and Governor were not able to agree on maps, the court determined to act in time for the 2024 election. In this section, the court also re-examined the "least changes" guidance set forth in the 2022 Wisconsin Supreme Court case Johnson v. Wisconsin Elections Commission. Writing for the majority, Karofsky wrote that "least changes" was never properly defined in Johnson, and proved unworkable in practice, as it was abandoned by its own authors. And since it had no textual basis in the Wisconsin constitution or statutes, "least changes" would not be a factor in the remedial map-making process. Finally, the court acknowledged that they would consider partisan impact in the map-making process, and would attempt to avoid selecting any map which privileged one political party over another.

=== Dissents ===
All three conservative justices wrote separate dissenting opinions. Chief Justice Annette Ziegler's dissent argued that the matter should not have been re-opened so soon after Johnson in 2022. She criticized the majority for ordering an "extreme remedy", accused them of pursuing a political agenda, and questioned the planned use of consultants to advise the judges during the remedial map selection process. Much of her dissent was spent on attacking the motivations of individual justices, airing personal grievances, and complaining about the manner in which the court had been run since the start of the new term in August 2023. Finally, she endorsed a number of technical reasons why she believed the court never should have heard the case.

Justice Rebecca Bradley wrote a separate dissent, which contained many of the same arguments present in Ziegler's. Bradley engaged with the contiguity issue to question the conclusions of the majority. Bradley also criticized the majority's acknowledgement that their remedial map process would seek partisan fairness, arguing that this was beyond the court's authority.

A third dissent was written by Justice Brian Hagedorn, who touched on several of the same issues. He criticized the political nature of the decision, pointed out the un-timely nature of this reconsideration of the Johnson decision, and criticized the abandonment of principles of judicial restraint. He concluded his dissent by recounting several of the same points he made in his concurring opinion in 2022's Johnson case, explaining that the Wisconsin Supreme Court still lacked a proper procedure for handling redistricting. He said the deficient process in Johnson had led to a reversal by the United States Supreme Court, and predicted that a similar result could occur again with Clarke. Even so, Justice Hagedorn stated that "the claim here that the constitution's original meaning requires the territory in all legislative districts to be physically contiguous is probably correct."

== Reaction ==
Robin Vos, speaker of the Wisconsin State Assembly, said "The case was pre-decided before it was even brought. Sad day for Wisconsin when the state supreme court just said last year that the existing lines are constitutional. Fortunately, the U.S. Supreme Court will have the last word."

Tony Evers, Governor of Wisconsin, said he "agree[d] with the Court's determination that these maps are unconstitutional because the districts lack contiguity," and that he "look[s] forward to submitting maps to the Court to consider and review that reflect and represent the makeup of our state."

Former United States Attorney General Eric Holder, chairman of the National Democratic Redistricting Committee, celebrated the ruling, saying, "It is way past time to end illegitimate minority rule in Wisconsin, and this decision is a powerful step toward fair representation."

Former president Barack Obama also hailed the enactment of new maps that resulted from this judgement, saying via Twitter: "Wisconsin made history this week! @GovEvers signed into law new, competitive state legislative maps that get rid of one of the most gerrymandered maps in the country. Wisconsinites will now have a real shot at electing leaders who are responsive to the will of the people."

== Remedial process ==
The Court's opinion suggested that the best case scenario for a remedial plan would be for the legislature and governor to agree and pass a map which complied with the constitutional requirements. With that looking unlikely, they set a schedule to accept and review remedial map proposals from the various litigants in the lawsuit.

Ultimately six different map proposals were submitted to the court as remedial options. Separate map proposals were submitted by Governor Evers, by the Republican Legislature, by a group of Wisconsin Senate Democrats, by the Law Forward petitioners, by the Wisconsin Institute for Law and Liberty intervenors, and by a group proposing a redistricting plan drawn by computer algorithm.

The Court hired two consultants to evaluate the map proposals and produce a report describing the merits and flaws of each plan. The consultants released their report on February 1, 2024, finding that the proposals from the Wisconsin Legislature and the Wisconsin Institute for Law and Liberty should be ruled out as gerrymanders.

With their two best map options effectively ruled out, Republicans in the Wisconsin Legislature decided to embrace Governor Evers' map proposal and move forward with a legislative remedy. They first passed an amended version of the Evers map to try to protect a handful of incumbents. After that map was vetoed, they passed Evers' map without changes. Evers signed that redistricting law on February 19, 2024, effectively completing the remedial process.

The Evers remedial map was first utilized for the 2024 State Assembly and 2024 State Senate elections.

== See also ==
- Constitution of Wisconsin
- Redistricting in Wisconsin
- Impeachment in Wisconsin
- 2023 Wisconsin Supreme Court election
