= Post-election lawsuits related to the 2020 U.S. presidential election from Wisconsin =

In direct response to election changes related to the COVID-19 pandemic and 2020 United States presidential election in Wisconsin; Donald Trump's campaign launched numerous lawsuits contesting the election processes of Wisconsin. All but one of these cases were either dismissed or dropped.

The sole case ruled in favour of Trump and the Republican party was Mark Jefferson v. Dane County, Wisconsin, on December 14, 2020. On December 14, 2020, a petition was filed in the Wisconsin Supreme Court by Mark Jefferson and the Republican Party of Wisconsin seeking a declaration that (1) Dane County lacks the authority to issue an interpretation of Wisconsin's election law allowing all electors in Dane County to obtain an absentee ballot without a photo identification and (2) Governor Tony Evers' Emergency Order #12 did not authorize all Wisconsin voters to obtain an absentee ballot without a photo identification. The Wisconsin Supreme Court ruled in favor of Mark Jefferson and the Republican Party of Wisconsin, stating that the Dane County government's interpretation of Wisconsin election laws was erroneous. "A county clerk may not 'declare' that any elector is indefinitely confined due to a pandemic," the court said. The court further stated that "...the presence of a communicable disease such as COVID-19, in and of itself, does not entitle all electors in Wisconsin to obtain an absentee ballot..." This ruling had no effect on the results of either Dane County or Wisconsin.

== Summary of lawsuits ==
Wisconsin post-election lawsuits related to the 2020 United States presidential election
First filing date	Case	Court	Docket no(s).	Outcome	Comments	References
November 12, 2020	Langenhorst v. Pecore	U.S. District Court for the Eastern District of Wisconsin	1:20-cv-01701-WCG	Dropped	Plaintiffs alleged inclusion of some invalid ballots in Milwaukee, Menominee and Dane counties results resulted in vote-dilution disenfranchisement, and sought to invalidate all votes from those counties before Wisconsin certified their results. Voluntarily dismissed by plaintiffs.	
November 23, 2020	Wisconsin Voters Alliance v. Wisconsin Elections Comm'n	Wisconsin Supreme Court	2020AP1930-OA	Dismissed	Plaintiffs claimed thousands of illegal ballots were cast and sought to stop certification of election. Petition denied.	
November 27, 2020	Mueller v. Jacobs	Wisconsin Supreme Court	No. 2020AP1958-OA	Dismissed	Plaintiffs claimed ballots collected from drop boxes were illegal and should not be counted; sought to stop certification of election. Wisconsin Supreme Court denied the petition in a 4–3 decision. Petition denied.	
December 1, 2020	Feehan v. Wisconsin Elections Comm'n	United States District Court for the Eastern District of Wisconsin	2:20-cv-1771	Dismissed	Plaintiffs challenged a variety of election practices and claimed electronic ballot stuffing campaign occurred. Plaintiffs seek decertification of election results. The case was dismissed for lack of jurisdiction on December 9, 2020. The plaintiff also lacked legal standing.	
December 1, 2020	Trump v. Evers	Wisconsin Supreme Court	2020AP1971-OA	Dismissed	Plaintiffs challenged several election practices and sought to overturn election results. The court denied hearing the petition in a 4–3 decision due to the case being filed directly in higher court whereas the case must first be filed and heard in circuit court. Petition denied.	
December 2, 2020	Trump v. Wisconsin Elections Comm'n	United States District Court for the Eastern District of Wisconsin United States Court of Appeals for the Seventh Circuit	2:20-cv-01785 (district court) 20-3414 (appeals court)	Dismissal upheld on appeal	Trump's "Electors Clause claims failed as a matter of law and fact". Additionally, Trump could have challenged the election practices before the vote occurred, but failed to do so. Dismissed with prejudice. Appeals court affirmed the district court's decision.	
December 7, 2020	Trump v. Biden	Wisconsin Circuit Court, Milwaukee County	2020CV7092 and 2020CV2514	Ruled after appeal	The district court "affirmed" the certification of Wisconsin's presidential election results, because Trump and other plaintiffs failed to prove that Wisconsin violated its "early voting laws" in its recount. The Wisconsin Supreme Court, in a 4–3 decision, affirmed the decision of the circuit court; the plaintiffs' claims were either "meritless" or rejected due to a delay that was "unreasonable in the extreme". Ruled in favor of the respondents: Biden et al.	

== Feehan v. Wisconsin Elections Comm'n ==
On December 1, 2020, Bill Feehan, the La Crosse County Republican Party chairman, filed a lawsuit against the Wisconsin Elections Commission in federal court. The plaintiffs, represented by conservative lawyer Sidney Powell, claimed that Dominion Voting Systems and Smartmatic, companies that provide voting software and hardware across the U.S., were used to conduct electronic ballot-stuffing and rig votes for Joe Biden. The plaintiffs also claimed that "indefinitely confined voters declared themselves so illegally, in-person absentee ballots are invalid and clerks illegally completed addresses on absentee ballots." As a remedy, the plaintiffs asked the court to decertify the state's election results, declare Donald Trump the winner of the state, or invalidate the absentee ballots at issue. The filing contained several misspellings and factual errors. Listed among the plaintiffs was Derrick Van Orden, a Republican candidate for Congress who lost his race; Van Orden said he did not give permission to be listed as a litigant. The lawsuit also sought footage of vote counting at the TCF Center, which is not located in Wisconsin but in Michigan.

On December 2, U.S. District Judge Pamela Pepper filed an order, noting that the plaintiffs filed a draft which did not comply with basic rules, and did not ask for a hearing or propose a briefing schedule.

On December 9, District Judge Pepper dismissed the case, writing that the "federal court has no authority or jurisdiction to grant the relief the remaining plaintiff seeks". The litigation on behalf of the plaintiff was "sometimes odd and often harried", and it ultimately failed to establish why a federal case was appropriate. The judge also repeatedly stated that the plaintiff did not have legal standing to bring the case. The judge concluded that granting the relief would be against the Constitution.

== Langenhorst v. Pecore ==
Three residents filed a lawsuit against clerks in Menominee, Dane, and Milwaukee counties in the Eastern District of Wisconsin, Green Bay Division, on November 11, 2020. The plaintiffs questioned the three counties that included a pandemic scenario in the definition of "indefinitely confined voters". Despite the State Supreme Court's ruling that the "advice [of including a pandemic scenario] was legally incorrect", this interpretation still caused a surge in absentee ballots this year. Additionally, the witness signature requirement was also relaxed. As the result, the plaintiffs wanted the ballots in the 3 counties (estimated 800,000 ballots) invalidated. The Trump campaign also alleged that three people who legally cast absentee ballots prior to election day died in the interim. Ann Jacobs of the Wisconsin Elections Commission stated: "They all died after they voted, so they were alive when they voted, and they died in the interim. With the coronavirus raging, it should not be a particular surprise to anyone. But also, that's really normal. People die. People die every month in the state of Wisconsin." The plaintiffs dropped the suit on November 16.

== Mueller v. Jacobs ==
On November 27, 2020, attorney Karen L. Mueller petitioned the Wisconsin Supreme Court on behalf of her husband, Dean W. Mueller of Chippewa Falls. Mueller alleged that the Wisconsin Elections Commission encouraged the collection of absentee ballots via drop boxes, without the proper rule-making authority to do so. Mueller asked the court to invalidate ballots collected at drop-boxes, the number of which is unclear; hold a new election; or otherwise block the certification of the state's election results, where Joe Biden won by about 20,000 votes, and direct the state legislature to appoint electors.

On December 3, the Wisconsin Supreme Court denied the petition in a 4–3 ruling. The court's conservative justices dissented, including Chief Justice Patience Drake Roggensack, and said, "This court cannot continue to shirk its institutional responsibilities to the people of Wisconsin."

== Trump v. Biden ==
On December 7, 2020, the Trump campaign filed lawsuits in state court against election officials in Milwaukee and Dane counties, seeking to nullify the presidential election.

On December 11, judge Stephen Simanek ruled in favor of the defendants, because the plaintiffs had failed to prove that Wisconsin violated its "early voting laws" in its recount. Additionally, Simanek ruled there was "no credible evidence of misconduct or wide-scale fraud". Hence, the district court "affirmed" the certification of Wisconsin's presidential election results, including the recounts Dane County and Milwaukee County.

After the ruling was quickly appealed, the Wisconsin Supreme Court ruled on the case on December 14, affirming the district court's decision in a 4–3 vote. According to the majority of justices, the plaintiffs' attempt to invalidate 28,000 indefinitely confined ballots was "meritless" and had "no basis in reason or law". Also according to the majority, three other attempts by the plaintiffs to invalidate ballots were rejected because of laches: the plaintiffs' delay in bringing the suit was "unreasonable in the extreme".

On December 29, 2020, Rudy Giuliani appealed this case to the Supreme court, citing a debunked conspiracy theory published in The Epoch Times.

== Trump v. Evers ==
On December 1, 2020, the day after Wisconsin certified its election results, the Trump campaign filed a lawsuit in the Wisconsin Supreme Court against Wisconsin Governor Tony Evers and other state election officials. The plaintiffs claimed that "elections workers illegally altered absentee ballot envelopes, counted ballots that had no required application, overlooked unlawful claims of indefinite confinement and held illegal voting events." As a remedy, they asked the court to decertify the state's election results and exclude 221,000 votes in Milwaukee and Dane counties from the count. The governor's legal team filed a response the same day, saying that the practices were widely accepted in Wisconsin's elections. Furthermore, they said the complaint only points to technical errors, and that under federal law voters cannot be penalized because of "immaterial error or omission under state law". On December 3, 2020, the court denied the petition in a 4–3 decision, saying that the suit must first be brought to the state's circuit courts.

Thereafter, the Trump campaign filed the lawsuit in the state's circuit court, making Wisconsin the only state to miss the December 8 federal "safe harbor" deadline. Meeting the deadline, by making sure all state level recounts and lawsuits are finished, means Congress must accept the electoral votes of the state and that the votes cannot be challenged in Congress. On December 10, Reserve Judge Stephen Simanek ruled against Trump and dismissed the case.

Hours after Judge Simanek's ruling, the Wisconsin Supreme Court agreed to hear the case, letting it skip the court of appeals. At oral argument on December 12, the court seemed divided between the three liberal-backed justices, Rebecca Dallet and Jill Karoksky, who showed skepticism toward the Trump campaign's argument, and three conservative-backed justices, Chief Justice Patience Roggensack plus Annette Ziegler and Rebecca Bradley, who showed some support for the campaign's claims. The views of the fourth conservative-backed justice, Brian Hagedorn, were not clear; Hagedorn mostly listened, and asked a few technical questions.

Justice Hagedorn wrote the 4–3 ruling against the Trump campaign, saying the campaign waited too long to bring the suit and should have brought the challenge before the election.

Following the ruling, justices Karofsky and Dallet received misogynistic and anti-Semitic online comments; with neo-Nazi website The Daily Stormer highlighting their Jewish heritage. Justice Hagedorn, who was personally criticized by Trump after the ruling, was also subjected to harassment. Wisconsin chief justice Roggensack reacted by condemning the "threats of actual or proposed violence" faced by the justices.

== Trump v. Wisconsin Elections Commission ==
On December 2, 2020, Donald Trump, in his capacity as a candidate for president, filed a lawsuit in federal district court against the Wisconsin Elections Commission. The campaign alleged that several election officials committed unconstitutional acts, and the risk of voter fraud was increased because of how absentee ballots were handled. The campaign challenged various directives given by the Wisconsin Elections Commission and claimed that a plan setting up absentee ballot drop boxes, made by the mayors of Milwaukee, Madison, Kenosha, Green Bay and Racine, was implemented without adequate security measures. The campaign also challenged the ballots of those who voted without showing a photo ID, after declaring themselves "indefinitely confined". For the challenged Wisconsin Elections Commission policies, the policy on witness addresses was issued in 2016, and updated in 2020; the policy on the qualifying criteria for "indefinitely confined" voter status during the COVID-19 pandemic was announced in March 2020; and the policy allowing absentee ballot drop boxes was enacted in August 2020. As a remedy, the campaign asked the court to overturn the results of the election and send the matter to the state legislature.

On December 12, Trump-appointed U.S. District Judge Brett Ludwig dismissed the case with prejudice. Judge Ludwig described the case as "extraordinary" with "even more extraordinary" relief sought. The judge ruled that the Trump campaign's "Electors Clause claims fail as a matter of law and fact" and that the opposite was proven: Wisconsin's presidential electors were determined exactly in the way the Wisconsin legislature intended, because the Wisconsin legislature had ordered the Wisconsin Election Commission to decide the rules of the election. The judge also noted that since the lawsuit was about "disputed issues of election administration" practices, Trump could have filed the lawsuit before the vote occurred, but failed to do so. The judge concluded that Trump "lost on the merits" in this case.

Trump appealed to the United States Court of Appeals for the Seventh Circuit, where a three-judge panel unanimously "affirmed" the district court's ruling. The panel ruled that Trump's "claims fail under the Electors Clause", because the Wisconsin legislature had given the Wisconsin Elections Commission the "authority" to manage the election, therefore there was no constitutional violation: Wisconsin's presidential electors were "lawfully appointed its electors in the manner directed by" the Wisconsin legislature. Trump's claims also failed due to "the unreasonable delay" in challenging the potential constitutional violation; entertaining such a late lawsuit would result in "unquestionable harm" to Wisconsin voters, ruled the judges. The appeals court decision was written by Michael Scudder Jr., a Trump appointee, while the other two judges, Joel Flaum and Ilana Rovner, were also Republican-appointed.

== Wisconsin Voters Alliance v. Wisconsin Elections Commission ==
On November 23, 2020, a group of Republican voters, the Wisconsin Voters Alliance, filed a lawsuit in the Wisconsin Supreme Court against the Wisconsin Elections Commission. The voters claimed that a Mark Zuckerberg-funded organization, Center for Technology and Civic Life, gave $6 million to the cities of Green Bay, Madison and Milwaukee in order to facilitate the casting of tens of thousands of illegal ballots. The group said Trump would have won the state without the inclusion of those ballots; as a remedy, they asked the court to stop the certification of the election, allow the state legislature to appoint electors, and order the governor to certify those electors. Democratic Attorney General Josh Kaul released a statement the following day, saying the litigation seeks to disenfranchise voters, and that his department "will ensure that Wisconsin's presidential electors are selected based on the will of the more than 3 million Wisconsin voters who cast a ballot." On December 4, the court rejected the petition, with Justice Brian Hagedorn writing: "Once the door is opened to judicial invalidation of presidential election results, it will be awfully hard to close that door again. This is a dangerous path we are being asked to tread."
