= Mike Roman =

American political operative

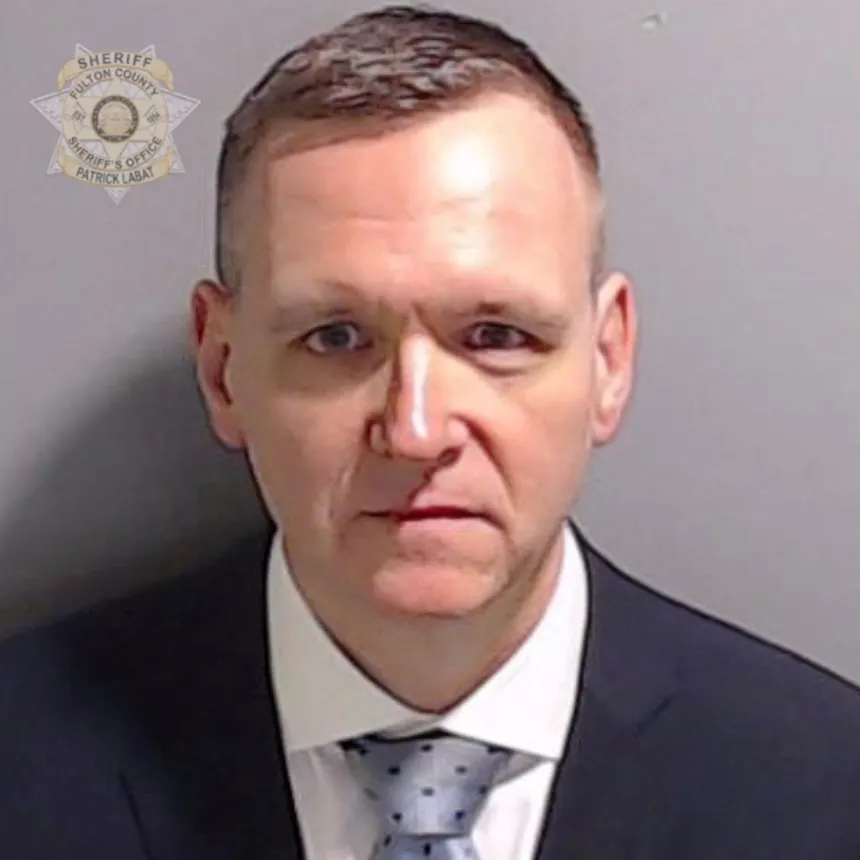
- Mug shot of Mike Roman, released by the Fulton County, Georgia, sheriff's office
- Born: December 7, 1972 (age 53); Philadelphia, Pennsylvania, U.S.
- Occupation: Political operative
- Known for: Campaign and White House aide to Donald Trump, indicted for attempts to overturn the 2020 election.
- Political party: Republican

Michael A. Roman (born 1972) is an American Republican political operative and opposition researcher. He was director of election day operations for Donald Trump's 2020 presidential campaign, and was subsequently involved in efforts to overturn the results of the 2020 election. He previously worked on Trump's 2016 campaign and served in Trump's White House in 2017 and 2018. Prior to joining the Trump campaign, he ran an in-house intelligence unit for the Koch brothers.

Roman has a history of making misleading and unsubstantiated claims about voter fraud, and posted baseless and deceptive claims of voter fraud on Election Day 2020. After Joe Biden was declared the winner of the 2020 presidential election, Roman was involved in the plan to produce false electoral votes to challenge the legitimate electoral votes of certain swing states at the January 6 certification. He delivered the false elector paperwork for Michigan and Wisconsin to U.S. representative Mike Kelly who provided them to U.S. senator Ron Johnson. Staff for Ron Johnson then tried to get these lists to Vice President Mike Pence before the count of the electoral votes on January 6, 2021.

On September 12, 2022, The New York Times reported that agents of the U.S. Justice Department seized Roman's cell phone in conjunction with 40 subpoenas issued in the investigation of the false electors. CNN reported in June 2023 that Roman had entered into a proffer agreement with the Smith special counsel investigation. Roman was subsequently indicted by state prosecutors in Georgia, Arizona, and Wisconsin.

== Career ==
He began his career as a Republican Party activist in Philadelphia, his hometown. Early in his career Roman was a political consultant in his home state of Pennsylvania and in New Jersey. He worked for State Representative John Perzel and ran the 56th Ward in Northeast Philadelphia for him until Perzel was indicted and later went to prison . He was director of Election Day operations at the Republican National Committee. He has been employed by the presidential campaigns of George W. Bush, Rudy Giuliani, and John McCain. Roman also served as chief of staff to former Illinois Congressman Bobby Schilling.

Roman was a senior advisor on the 2016 Trump campaign as the campaign's chief poll watcher.

Prior to joining the Trump presidential campaign, Roman headed up an intelligence gathering operation for Charles and David Koch, industrialists and high-profile Republican donors. The now-defunct office surveilled and gathered intelligence on liberal opponents of conservative policies.

Roman describes his blog Election Journal as dedicated to "fraud, cheating, dirty tricks, absurdity and other election news." According to Richard L. Hasen, Chancellor's Professor of Law and Political Science at the University of California, Irvine, the blog appears to focus, "only on incidents favoring Republican's claims against Democrats". During the 2008 presidential election, Election Monitoring, combined GoogleMaps, with Twitter, Flickr and YouTube to enable voters and poll watchers to post what they saw as instances of voter disenfranchisement and election fraud in a real time, online map. One scholar, while recognizing the non-verifiable nature of this approach, asserted that it "opens up new potential for election monitoring that addresses some of the limitations that established and official (election monitoring organizations) face".

After Trump's inauguration, Roman was appointed to a position in the White House as Special Assistant to the President and Director of Special Projects and Research. Politico described it as "a vague title that reveals almost nothing." His appointment drew attention at the time because in previous administrations it was unusual for opposition researchers to work directly for the White House—they would typically remain employed by the campaign or the presidential transition team. Roman ultimately left the White House in April 2018.

== See also ==
- List of alleged Georgia election racketeers
