= Boris Epshteyn =

American attorney and political strategist (born 1982)

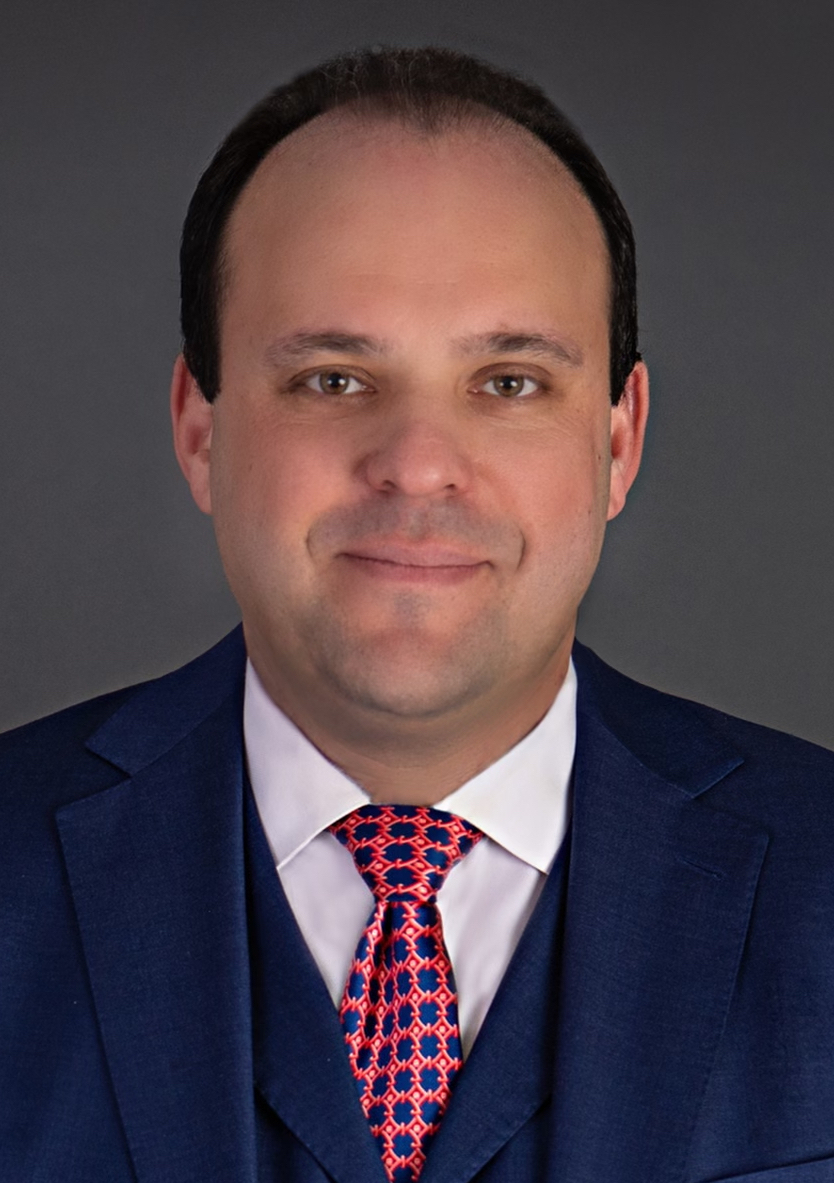
- Epshteyn in 2021

Personal details
- Born: August 14, 1982 (age 44) Moscow, Russian SFSR, Soviet Union
- Party: Republican
- Spouse: Lauren Tanick (m. 2009)
- Children: 1
- Education: Swarthmore College (attended); Georgetown University (BS, JD)

Boris Epshteyn (Note: Russian: Бори́с Эпште́йн, IPA: [bɐˈrʲis ɪpʂˈtʲɛjn]) (/ˈɛpstaɪn/ EP-styne; born August 14, 1982) is a Russian-American Republican political strategist, attorney, and investment banker. He is, since January 2025, the personal senior counsel to President Donald Trump. He was previously a strategic advisor on Donald Trump's 2020 presidential campaign and has remained a close advisor to Trump in his inter-presidency. He was the chief political commentator at Sinclair Broadcast Group until December 2019. He was also a senior advisor to Trump's 2016 campaign for President of the United States, and previously worked on John McCain's 2008 presidential campaign. Following Trump's election, he was named director of communications for the Presidential Inaugural Committee, and then assistant communications director for surrogate operations in the White House Office, until he resigned in March 2017. He was a member of a team of Trump lawyers who sought to prevent the certification of Joe Biden's victory in the 2020 presidential election. In April 2024, Epshteyn was indicted in Arizona for his alleged role in the fake elector plot for the state.

== Early life and education ==
Epshteyn was born in 1982 in Moscow, Soviet Union. His family are Russian Jews. In 1993, he immigrated as a refugee with his family to the US, and settled in Plainsboro Township, New Jersey, under the Lautenberg amendment of 1990. He graduated from West Windsor-Plainsboro High School in 2000. In 2000, he matriculated at Swarthmore College, which he attended for one year before transferring to Georgetown University. Epshteyn graduated from the Georgetown University School of Foreign Service (BSFS, 2004). During his time as an undergraduate at Georgetown, Epshteyn joined the Eta Sigma chapter of the Alpha Epsilon Pi (AEPi) fraternity. He graduated from the Georgetown University Law Center with a Juris Doctor in 2007.

== Career ==
Following his graduation from law school, Epshteyn was part of the finance practice of Milbank, Tweed, Hadley & McCloy. He worked on securities transactions, private placements, and bank finance.

In 2008, Epshteyn was a communications aide with the McCain-Palin campaign. While at the campaign, he was part of a rapid response task force that concentrated on issues related to vice presidential nominee Sarah Palin.

Epshteyn was managing director of business and legal affairs at West America Securities Corporation, a small broker-dealer, until the firm was expelled by the Financial Industry Regulatory Authority in 2013 for failing to pay fines arising from unsupported representations about the legitimacy of foreign government bonds with a purported face value of roughly $24 billion. He was managing director of business and legal affairs for investment banking firm TGP Securities from 2013 to 2017. In October 2013, Epshteyn moderated a panel at the investment conference "Invest in Moscow!". The panel was composed mainly of Moscow city government officials, including Sergey Cheremin, a city minister who heads Moscow's foreign economic and international relations department.

=== 2016 Trump campaign ===
In May 2016, Epshteyn joined the Donald Trump campaign as a media surrogate, and later became a paid senior adviser to the campaign in August 2016. In September 2016, Epshteyn responded to a question from MSNBC's Hallie Jackson by offering a new explanation for why a portrait of Trump – paid for by the Donald J. Trump Foundation – wound up on display at Trump National Doral Miami, a Trump-owned for-profit golf resort in Florida. Epshteyn said, "There are IRS rules which specifically state that when a foundation has an item, an individual can store those items – on behalf of the foundation – in order to help it with storage costs... And that's absolutely proper." Epshteyn's explanation was, in effect, that Trump had not used his foundation to buy some art for his resort, which would be self-dealing. Instead, Trump's resort was helping the foundation – which has no employees or office space of its own – to store one of its possessions. Epshteyn's explanation failed to account for why the storage services required that portrait be displayed in public, as opposed to being maintained in a storage space. Similarly, Epshteyn failed to explain why the Trump National Doral Miami provided such storage services only for the Trump Foundation and only for a portrait of Trump.

In September 2016, the media watchdog organization Media Matters for America criticized CNN, Fox News, and PBS for failing to disclose Epshteyn's "financial ties to the former Soviet Union, which include consulting through Strategy International LLC for 'entities doing business in Eastern Europe' and moderating a Russian-sponsored conference on 'investment opportunities in Moscow'".

In an October 2016 article in The New York Times, three political commentators said in separate interviews that Epshteyn "often acted in a rude, condescending manner toward show staffers, makeup artists and others". Joy Reid, an MSNBC show host, said "Boris is abrasive. That is who he is both on the air and off." Epshteyn co-hosted the Trump Campaign Facebook Live coverage before and after the final presidential debate. He also anchored Trump Tower Live, the Trump campaign's Facebook Live nightly program.

During the 2020 United States presidential election, Epshteyn was a senior advisor to the Trump campaign.

=== Trump administration ===
Epshteyn became a special assistant in the Trump administration as it took office. He wrote Trump's controversial statement for Holocaust Remembrance Day in January 2017, which omitted any mention of the Jewish people. Following criticism of the omission, press secretary Sean Spicer defended the statement as written by "an individual who is both Jewish and the descendent of Holocaust survivors." At the end of March 2017, Epshteyn resigned.

=== Sinclair Broadcast Group ===
In mid-April 2017, Sinclair announced it had hired Epshteyn as its senior political analyst. Regarding the appointment, Scott Livingston at Sinclair said in part, "We understand the frustration with government and traditional institutions." Epshteyn said in part, "I greatly admire Sinclair's mission to provide thoughtful impactful reporting throughout the country." At the time, Variety also noted Jared Kushner's December 2016 revelation of discussions between the Trump campaign and the company and content provided to the company which, the report said, Sinclair had "vehemently denied". His segment on Sinclair ended in late 2019.

=== Trump advisor ===
Epshteyn was the strategic advisor and co-chair of the Jewish Voices for Trump Advisory Board for Trump's 2020 re-election campaign. He led the campaign's Jewish outreach, appearing in media interviews across national outlets and participating in large-scale events across the country, including in Florida, Pennsylvania, and New York.

Trump garnered the highest Jewish support for a Republican presidential candidate since George H. W. Bush in 1988, receiving 30% of the vote nationally and 42% in the key battleground state of Florida, which Trump won. Trump's 2020 results with Jewish voters were higher than his 2016 totals, when he received 24% of the Jewish vote nationally and 30% in Florida. After Trump lost the election, Epshteyn was a member of a team that gathered at a "command center" in the Willard Hotel one block from the White House days before Joe Biden's victory was to be certified by Vice President Mike Pence in the Senate chamber on January 6. The team's objective was to prevent Biden's victory from being certified. On January 2, Trump and two of his attorneys, Rudy Giuliani and John Eastman, held a conference call with some 300 Republican state legislators in battleground states Biden won to provide them with false allegations of widespread voting fraud they might use to convene special sessions of their legislatures to rescind Biden's winning slates of electors and replace them with slates of Trump electors for Pence to certify. On January 5, dozens of Republican legislators from Arizona, Georgia, Michigan, Pennsylvania and Wisconsin wrote Pence asking him to delay the January 6 certification for ten days so they would have time to replace the elector slates. Pence did not act on the request and that day also rejected a proposal made by Eastman that a vice president could simply choose to reject the electoral college results; a vice president's role in certifying the results is constitutionally ministerial. Epshteyn told The Washington Post in October 2021 that he continued to believe Pence "had the constitutional power to send the issue back to the states for 10 days to investigate the widespread fraud and report back well in advance of Inauguration Day, January 20th." Epshteyn worked with Giuliani in December 2020 to persuade Republican officials in seven states to prepare certificates of ascertainment for slates of "alternate electors" loyal to Trump, which would be presented to Pence for certification. Epshteyn and others asserted this was a contingency similar to the 1960 presidential election, in which two slates of electors were prepared pending results of a late recount of ballots in Hawaii. Both parties agreed to that recount, which ultimately resulted in John F. Kennedy winning the state, though the outcome of the election did not hinge on the Hawaii results. By contrast, in the case of the 2020 election, the stated need for slates of alternate electors in multiple states was predicated on persistent unproven claims of nationwide election fraud. Epshteyn asserted the slates of alternate electors were not fraudulent and "it is not against the law, it is according to the law."

After Trump left office, Epshteyn established a close relationship with the former president and has advised him to pursue a confrontational rather than a conciliatory approach toward those investigating Trump. He was subpoenaed in January 2022 to testify before the House Select Committee on the January 6 Attack.

Epshteyn joined Trump on his trip to Manhattan for his arraignment in April 2023. Likely around this time, Boris Epshteyn spoke to special counsel Jack Smith. "Boris Epshteyn sat for an interview with us", Smith later testified to Congress in December 2025. "We would have welcomed calling him as a witness." Epshteyn was identified by the New York Times as the likely identity of "Co-Conspirator 6" in the August 1, 2023, indictment of Trump for conspiracy.

In April 2024, Epshteyn was indicted in Arizona for his alleged role in the fake elector plot.

In November 2024, it was reported after an internal investigation that Trump's top lawyer, David Warrington, had alleged that Epshteyn had asked for monetary payments from at least two people seeking White House jobs. One of those two people was billionaire hedge fund manager Scott Bessent, who said he refused Epshteyn's requests for money. Despite denying the alleged payment, Bessent was still nominated by Trump for the position of Secretary of the Treasury. Trump's attorneys concluded that Trump should distance himself from Epshteyn.

Epshteyn served as Trump's senior legal adviser and coordinated the efforts of Trump's legal team leading up to and after the 2024 presidential election. A majority of cases against Trump were dropped once he won the election. Nonetheless, Epshteyn remained President Trump's personal senior counsel after the January 2025 inauguration, and was instrumental in selecting attorneys for Trump's appointments.

In January 2025, Epshteyn served as a member of the Presidential Delegation to attend the commemoration of the anniversary of the Liberation of Auschwitz-Birkenau in Oświęcim, Poland. In March 2025, Epshteyn served as a member of the Presidential Delegation to attend the opening ceremony of the 2025 Special Olympics World Winter Games in Turin, Italy.

== Personal life ==
Epshteyn married Lauren Tanick Epshteyn, a sales manager at Google, in 2009. They have one child.

Epshteyn is a friend of Eric Trump, who also attended Georgetown.

== Legal issues ==
In 2014, Epshteyn was charged with misdemeanor assault after an altercation at a bar. The charge was dropped after he agreed to undergo anger management counseling and perform community service.

On October 10, 2021, Epshteyn was arrested at a night club. Three of the four charges were dismissed. Epshteyn pleaded guilty to "disorderly conduct-disruptive behavior or fighting", for which he served probation. After probation that conviction was set aside. He was also remanded to alcohol treatment. Epshteyn was indicted for his role in Arizona's fake electors scheme on April 24, 2024. On June 18, 2024, Epshteyn pleaded not guilty while speaking to the Maricopa County court by phone. Epshteyn is accused of assisting Rudy Giuliani in carrying out the scheme to submit fake electors for Trump in Arizona.

== See also ==
- List of people granted executive clemency in the second Trump presidency
