= Ian Bassin =

American lawyer, writer, and activist

Ian Bassin is an American lawyer, writer, and activist who serves as executive director of Protect Democracy. He previously served as Associate White House Counsel under President Obama.

Bassin is a recipient of the 2023 MacArthur "Genius Award" for "working to strengthen the structures, norms, and institutions of democratic governance in the United States." He has also received the Skoll Award for Social Innovation.

In 2023, Bassin gave a TED talk on "'How to Spot Authoritarianism and Choose Democracy,'" detailing the seven steps of the authoritarian playbook and advocating for freedom. In 2024, Bassin was named to the Time100 Next list of emerging global leaders, and he has repeatedly been named by Washingtonian magazine as one of the 500 most influential people in Washington, D.C.

== Education ==
Ian Bassin graduated with a B.A. from Wesleyan University in 1998 and a J.D. from Yale Law School in 2006. Bassin transferred to Yale from George Washington University. While at Yale Law School, he and Justin Florence co-founded a group called "Law Students Against Alito," opposing the confirmation of Samuel Alito to the Supreme Court.

== Early career ==
In 2007, Bassin joined the Obama campaign’s policy team, and later the Obama-Biden transition team. From 2009 to 2011, he served in the White House Counsel’s Office. As Associate White House Counsel, Bassin worked on democracy issues and the rules that govern executive branch behavior.

After leaving the White House, Bassin was reportedly involved in a number of social activism efforts around the world. In 2012, he helped organize a campaign that freed more than 100 migrant laborers in Bahrain who were being held against their will and in violation of international human rights law. In 2013, Ian directed a litigation effort in South Africa that reaffirmed the right under the South African Constitution to publicly criticize the president. He also helped with organizing efforts in support of Syrians during Bashar al-Assad’s war. In 2014, he was involved in a campaign to protect women’s rights in Afghanistan.

In 2015, when he was Deputy Counsel to the Mayor of New York City, he was criticized by the New York Post for his early and public denunciation of Eric Garner's killing by New York Police Department officer Daniel Pantaleo. While Deputy Counsel to the Mayor, to reduce arrests of youth who danced on New York City subways, Bassin created a city-sponsored training and performance program for street dancers called “It’s Showtime NYC.” He worked with the Chief of the NYPD Transit Division to divert subway dancers into the program, in lieu of arrest.

In 2016, Bassin was part of the team at GiveDirectly, a non-governmental organization operating in Kenya that launched one of the largest universal basic income experiments in history.

== Protect Democracy ==
In 2016, Bassin also co-founded the nonprofit organization Protect Democracy. According to Time Magazine, Protect Democracy is a “defender of America’s system of government against the threat of authoritarianism." The organization includes progressives, moderates, and conservatives who have worked for Democratic and Republican elected officials.

In his role as executive director, Bassin has been a frequent commentator on the state of American democracy, the dangers it faces, and what is needed to save it. He is a critic of unchecked presidential war powers under both President Obama and President Trump. He was credited by The Daily Beast with causing then-candidate Joe Biden to clarify and walk back remarks suggesting he would defy a congressional subpoena during the first Trump impeachment.

Bassin coined the term “autocratic capture," describing “a form of systemic corruption in which politicians have improper influence on private companies [and] use government power to put pressure on businessmen and to force them, or their employees, to toe a political line."

In 2024, Bassin and Maximillian Potter wrote an article for the Columbia Journalism Review, entitled "On Anticipatory Obedience and the Media," which one media critic called "the most prophetic essay of the year."
