= Nevada prosecution of fake electors =

Criminal prosecution concerning the Trump fake electors scheme

Nevada v. McDonald
- Court: Nevada District Court, Clark County; Nevada District Court, Carson City
- Full case name: State of Nevada v. Michael J. McDonald, et al.
- Docket nos.: C-23-379122-4
- Charge: Uttering forged instruments; Offering a false instrument for filing or record (Clark County only)

Court membership
- Judge sitting: Mary Kay Holthus

State of Nevada v. Michael J. McDonald, et al. is a state criminal prosecution of participants in the Trump fake electors plot in Nevada. The six defendants were each indicted on two felony forgery charges related to documents that falsely claimed that Donald Trump won the state's electoral votes in the 2020 U.S. presidential election in Nevada. Among the accused are Michael J. McDonald, the chair of the Nevada Republican Party, and Clark County Republican chairman Jesse Law.

In December 2023, a grand jury issued an indictment in Clark County. All six defendants pleaded not guilty. In June 2024, a district court judge dismissed the case on the grounds of improper venue; however, the Supreme Court of Nevada overturned the dismissal in November 2025. The same judge dismissed the case again in August 2026.

== Background ==
Democratic nominee Joe Biden won the 2020 presidential election, and carried the state of Nevada, defeating Republican nominee Donald Trump in the popular vote by 33,596 votes, and gaining all of the state's six electoral votes. Trump and his allies, however, refused to accept the election results and launched an ultimately unsuccessful campaign to remain in power via subverting the election results.

In 2022, during the investigation of the U.S. House select committee on the January 6 attack, Nevada GOP chair Michael J. McDonald and Nevada GOP secretary James DeGraffenreid were both subpoenaed on January 28 and deposed on February 24.

In May 2023, Nevada Attorney General Aaron Ford indicated when testifying before the Nevada Legislature that the fake electors might not be charged, as current state statutes did not "directly address" their conduct.. However, in November 2023, it was reported that Ford was actively investigating individuals who had acted as fake electors.

== Defendants ==
The defendants are:

- Michael J. McDonald, Nevada Republican Party chairman
- James DeGraffenreid, Nevada Republican national committeeman
- Jesse Law, Clark County Republican Party chairman
- James Hindle III, Storey County clerk
- Shawn Meehan, Nevada Republican who acted as Chairman of the Resolutions
- Eileen Rice, Nevada Republican elector

== Pretrial proceedings ==
=== Indictment and arraignment ===
On December 5, 2023, a Nevada grand jury in the District Court for Clark County issued an indictment charging six Nevada Republicans. The indictment stems from the sending of a document falsely ascertaining that Trump had won the state. Each of the six defendants was charged with two felony counts:

- Offering false instrument for file or record: Defendants "knowingly procured" and offered a false instrument to be "filed, registered, or recorded in a public office"
- Uttering forged instruments: Defendants, with intent to "defraud, uttered, offered, and disposed", falsely put off an instrument as true

Nevada was the third state to bring charges in the fake elector scheme, after Georgia and Michigan. Arizona later became the fourth state to bring charges. If convicted, they faced between one and five years in prison.

The six defendants were arraigned on December 16, 2023; all pleaded not guilty. Judge Mary Kay Holthus set the trial for March 11, 2024. This was later moved to January 13, 2025.

=== Dismissal and reinstatement ===
On June 21, 2024, Judge Mary Kay Holthus of the Eighth Judicial District Court in Clark County said the court was the wrong venue for the case, as no elements of the alleged crime had occurred in the county; the casting of votes had occurred in Carson City and the documents were mailed from Douglas County. She dismissed the case on this basis.

Attorney General Ford appealed to the Supreme Court of Nevada the following month, and the court heard arguments a year later. In the meantime, on December 12, 2024, prosecutors re-filed the "uttering forged instruments" charges in Carson City, but they could not file the "filing false instruments" charges again as the shorter statute of limitations for those charges had already expired.

On November 13, 2025, the Nevada Supreme Court ruled 6–0 that the case could proceed in Clark County. This was seen as a favorable decision for state prosecutors, as the jury pool in Clark County was seen as potentially more favorable to them than in Carson City.

On August 13, 2026, Judge Holthus again dismissed the case. On October 12, Ford again appealed the case to the Nevada Supreme Court.
