= Post-election lawsuits related to the 2020 U.S. presidential election from Arizona =

In direct response to election changes related to the COVID-19 pandemic, 2020 United States presidential election in Arizona, and "Sharpiegate"; the Donald Trump 2020 presidential campaign launched numerous lawsuits contesting the election processes of Arizona. All of these were either dismissed or dropped.

== Summary of lawsuits ==
Arizona post-election lawsuits related to the 2020 United States presidential election
| First filing date | Case | Court | Docket no(s). | Outcome | Comments | References |
|---|---|---|---|---|---|---|
| November 4, 2020 | Aguilera v. Fontes | Arizona Superior Court, Maricopa County | CV2020-014083 | Dropped | Original "Sharpie lawsuit". Voluntarily dismissed. | |
| November 12, 2020 | Aguilera v. Fontes | Arizona Superior Court, Maricopa County | CV2020-014562 | Dismissed | Second suit brought by Aguilera, alleging her vote was not counted and asking for opportunity to cast a new ballot. Dismissed with prejudice. | |
| November 7, 2020 | Donald J. Trump for President v. Hobbs | Arizona Superior Court, Maricopa County | CV2020-014248 | Dropped | Repackaged "Sharpie lawsuit". Plaintiffs allege local poll workers induced voters to override alerts from the tabulation machine when a vote was flagged as unreadable, causing affected votes on those ballots to be disqualified. Voluntarily dismissed. | |
| November 12, 2020 | Arizona Republican Party v. Fontes | Arizona Superior Court, Maricopa County | CV2020-014553 | Dismissed | Suit sought to force a hand count of votes separated by precinct instead of counting them by voting center. Dismissed with prejudice. | |
| November 30, 2020 | Ward v. Jackson | Arizona Superior Court, Maricopa County | CV2020-015285 | Dismissed | Dismissed. Dismissal upheld by Arizona Supreme Court. Petition to the Supreme Court of the United States for writ of certiorari was filed, and denied on Feb 22 2021. | |
| December 2, 2020 | Bowyer v. Ducey | Arizona United States District Court United States Court of Appeals for the Ninth Circuit | 2:20-cv-02321 | Dismissed | Lawsuit seeking de-certification of Arizona results, litigated by Sidney Powell. The judge ruled that the plaintiffs lacked legal standing; their fraud allegations were vague and implausible, and their evidence was unreliable or irrelevant. Appealed to the Ninth circuit, appeal dismissed. | |
| December 4, 2020 | Stevenson v. Ducey | Arizona Superior Court, Maricopa County | CV2020-096490 | Dropped | Election contest lawsuit. Voluntarily dismissed. | |

== Aguilera v. Fontes ==
=== November 4 lawsuit ===
On November 4, 2020, a voter, Laurie Aguilera, filed a lawsuit (CV2020-014083) against Maricopa County seeking the opportunity for voters to fix their ballots where the ballots were marked using Sharpies. Aguilera alleged that her vote was not counted at the ballot box because of Sharpie ink "bleeding" through ballot paper, and that poll workers cancelled her ballot and refused to allow her to cast a new one; county officials denied the claims. The claims were dubbed "Sharpiegate" on social media, which the county recorder Adrian Fontes said was "hoo-hah". Fontes said the ballots are designed to be processed even in the event of ink bleed-through. Pima County officials described the allegations as false, saying ballots can be tabulated when marked with felt-tip pens. On November 7, the plaintiffs voluntarily dismissed the suit.

=== November 12 lawsuit ===
On November 12, 2020, Laurie Aguilera filed a second lawsuit (No. CV2020-014562) with another Arizona voter, Donovan Drobina; the lawsuit was filed in Arizona Superior Court against Maricopa County Recorder Adrian Fontes. The plaintiffs alleged that their votes were not counted by the electronic tabulation system, and that ballots were tabulated by election workers even though state law requires votes to be counted by machines when they are properly working. As a remedy, they asked to cast new ballots and have the human review process be opened to the public. Maricopa County Superior Court Judge Margaret Mahoney dismissed the lawsuit on November 20, ruling that the two ballots at issue would not affect the outcome of the election.

== Arizona Republican Party v. Fontes ==
On November 12, 2020, the Arizona Republican Party filed a lawsuit against Maricopa County Reporter Adrian Fontes, seeking an audit of votes in the county. On November 19, the lawsuit was dismissed with prejudice and the Republican Party's request for an injunction against Maricopa County denied. In his ruling, Judge John Hannah invited the Secretary of State's Office to seek payment for attorney's fees from the Arizona Republican Party, citing a state law that allows for such awards when a party brings a claim "without substantial justification" or "solely or primarily for delay or harassment".

== Bowyer v. Ducey ==
On December 2, 2020, Arizona voters and one candidate for Republican Arizona presidential elector, filed a lawsuit in federal court against the governor, secretary of state, and other Arizona election officials. Plaintiffs alleged, according to the Stanford-MIT Healthy Elections Project, "that poll watchers failed to adequately verify signatures on ballots, that Maricopa County ballot dispute referees were partisan, that Dominion backups had no chain of custody, and the Dominion machines themselves suffered from errors during state evaluations." The plaintiffs asked the court to decertify Arizona's election results, or order that Arizona certify Trump electors. Sidney Powell litigated on behalf of the plaintiffs.

On December 9, federal judge Diane Humetewa ruled that the plaintiffs lacked legal standing, and the allegations of impropriety brought were "sorely wanting of relevant or reliable evidence", instead being "largely based on anonymous witnesses, hearsay, and irrelevant analysis of unrelated elections". The judge singled out the fraud allegations being put forth, writing that they "fail in their particularity and plausibility". The judge ruled that there would be "extreme, and entirely unprecedented" harm to Arizona's 3+ million voters to entertain the lawsuit "at this late date".

An appeal was lodged, but was withdrawn, and the case dismissed on April 13, 2021.

== Burk v. Ducey ==
On December 7, 2020, an Arizona resident filed a lawsuit in Pinal County Superior Court against state officials, including Governor Doug Ducey and Secretary of State Katie Hobbs, asking for an audit and to block the transmission of the state's election results to the electoral college. The plaintiff alleged a former Coolidge Mayor candidate claimed he worked for the government and participated in a scheme to take fake ballots into the Maricopa County Election Center from a South Korean plane. After questioning by FBI agents, Koch recanted and said he fabricated the entire story. Before Koch recanted his story, Judge Kevin White dismissed the lawsuit on December 15, concluding that the plaintiff had brought the suit too late and lacked standing as a qualified elector to bring an election challenge because she was not registered to vote. Burk's case was a near identical copy of the complaint filed in Bowyer v. Ducey by Sidney Powell, who claimed publicly in December 2020 that planes loaded with ballots were brought to Sky Harbor. Though Powell did not include this detail in her court filings, she named Ryan Hartwig as a witness that would testify about "a suspicious plane" in Bowyer v Ducey. Kelly Townsend, who was Chair of the Arizona House of Representatives Elections Committee and had just been elected to the Arizona Senate, was also disclosed as a witness in the Bowyer v Ducey case. Hartwig claimed he went to the airport and took video of the plane after he spoke with Townsend at the Stop the Steal rally. He later appeared on right-wing media amplifying claims of election fraud while working directly with Powell. Hartwig attended the rally at the U.S. Capitol on January 6, 2021. Burk claimed she learned about the South Korean plane from the Trump campaign the day after Hartwig and Congressmen Gosar's chief of staff tried to prevent the plane from allegedly transporting fake ballots from Phoenix to Seattle. Shortly after the election, Burk was contacted by a FedEx supervisor in Seattle who believed suspicious ballots were passing through her facility and was told that Burk knew legislators in Arizona that might help her reach the FBI when she could not get through. By August 2021, Burk publicly stated she no longer believed there was election fraud in the 2020 election and she had been manipulated by Townsend and an associate. Townsend was a leader in the Stop the Steal movement and Oathkeeper with militia ties who sponsored a bill to recall Trump electors. In mid December 2020, Townsend tweeted a biblical reference that some interpreted as a threat against the Arizona Governor's life.

== Donald J. Trump for President v. Hobbs ==
Centered on a debunked conspiracy theory known as "Sharpiegate", the "Sharpie lawsuit" from the Trump campaign against Arizona Secretary of State Katie Hobbs alleged that legal ballots with stray markings or bleed-through from markers were being thrown out. Stories surfaced on social media claiming that election workers were purposefully having voters mark their ballots with a Sharpie so their vote would not be counted. In response, Maricopa County announced that "Sharpies are not a problem for our tabulation equipment, and the offset columns on ballots ensure that bleed through won't impact your vote". On November 4, Arizona attorney general Mark Brnovich announced an investigation; the next day, he said "we are now confident that the use of Sharpie markers did not result in disenfranchisement". The rumor was also publicly debunked by the Department of Homeland Security.

The Trump campaign requested that their evidence be kept secret from the public, but the judge refused to allow the secrecy. The Trump campaign also asserted that they had video footage from within a polling area; however, such footage would be illegal if taken within 75 feet (23 m) of a polling area with voters present. The Trump campaign attempted to submit affidavits they collected, but admitted that some of these affidavits were "false" or "spam"; the judge refused to accept the affidavits as evidence, calling them unreliable. Additionally, during questioning, none of the witnesses indicated that they had a basis to believe that their vote was improperly discarded, with the only impropriety raised being election workers pressing buttons for them.

During the hearing, the lawyer for the Trump campaign, Kory Langhofer, stated that the plaintiffs were "not alleging fraud" or "that anyone is stealing the election", but were disputing "good faith errors".

On November 13, the lawsuit regarding presidential ballots was dropped, after it became evident that the number of votes potentially to be contested (191) would not overcome Biden's margin of victory in the state (11,414 at the time, with 10,315 uncounted).

== Stevenson v. Ducey ==
On December 4, 2020, members of Arizona Election Integrity Association (AEIA) filed an election contest lawsuit (CV2020-096490) in the Superior Court of Arizona in Maricopa County. The lawsuit challenged a total of 371,498 votes, alleging that the votes were illegally counted. The plaintiffs asked the Court to vacate the certification of Arizona's election results and issue an injunction to stop state election officials from certifying the election, so that the Arizona General Assembly can appoint electors. On December 7, the plaintiffs filed a notice of voluntary dismissal.

== Ward v. Jackson ==
On November 30, 2020, an Arizona voter and state Republican Party Chair, Kelli Ward, filed a lawsuit in the Superior Court of Arizona, Maricopa County. Ward challenged the signature verification process, claiming election workers were unfit to verify signatures. Ward also challenged the ballot duplication process, whereby bipartisan county workers transferred votes to new ballots when ballot tabulators could not read them, claiming that observers were not allowed to view the entire process. As a remedy, Ward asked the court to decertify the election results, where Biden won by 10,457 votes, and instead award the elector votes to Trump. Attorney Marc Elias represented the defendants, 11 Biden electors, and argued that the issues raised by Ward are "garden-variety errors." Judge Randall Warner dismissed the lawsuit on December 4.

After the Arizona Supreme Court rejected her appeal, concluding that Ward presented no evidence of misconduct, Ward appealed to the United States Supreme Court.

On February 21, 2021, the U.S. Supreme Court declined to hear Ward's case.

== See also ==
- Arizona prosecution of fake electors
