= Chanel Rion =

American media personality (born 1990)

- Born: Chanel Dayn-Ryan; April 28, 1990 (age 36); Houston, Texas, U.S.
- Education: Harvard Extension School
- Occupation: Broadcaster
- Employer: One America News Network
- Political party: Republican
- Spouse: Courtland Sykes
- Parent(s): Kim Soon Dayn-Ryan; Danford Dayn-Ryan
- Website: www.chanelrion.com

Chanel Rion (born Chanel Dayn-Ryan; April 28, 1990) is an American broadcaster. She was formerly the chief White House correspondent for One America News Network (OAN), a far-right American cable channel. She is known for promoting conspiracy theories.

== Early life and education ==
Chanel Rion was born Chanel Dayn-Ryan. Her father is Danny Preboth, also known as Danford Dayn-Ryan and David Michael Ryan. Her paternal grandfather, Roland Preboth, was a Baptist minister who ran unsuccessfully for the Democratic nomination for lieutenant governor, U.S. Senate, and secretary of state. Her paternal grandmother, Allene Cunningham, was a Kansas-based psychic. Her mother was born in South Korea. Rion changed her surname in 2019, prior to applying for a White House press pass.

Rion attended the extension school of Harvard University, where she was a member of the Anscombe Society, a right-wing student group. At Harvard Extension School she met Courtland Sykes, who would become her husband.

== Career ==
=== One America News White House correspondent ===
In 2019, Rion was hired by One America News Network (OAN). She was hired after OAN's former White House correspondent Neil McCabe invited Courtland Sykes, by this time Rion's fiancé, for a tour of OAN. McCabe told Sykes that OAN was hiring for a White House correspondent to work weekends and Sykes suggested they hire Rion. Rion did a screen test and was hired.

In October 2019, Rion reported that ex-FBI Deputy Director Andrew McCabe and ex-FBI lawyer Lisa Page had an affair. Rion obtained two senior FBI officials as sources who claimed Lisa Page was having the affair and at one time was living with Deputy Director Andrew McCabe. Although Will Sommer of The Daily Beast claimed that OAN retracted the story, citing Jack Posobiec, OAN President Charles Herring stated that the story remains under investigation. OAN has not retracted the story, as confirmed in a statement on their official social media account.

Later that year, in December, Rion presented "Revealed: Ukrainian witnesses destroy Schiff's case exclusive with Rudy Giuliani". The two part series, presented on OAN, featured Rion interviewing Rudy Giuliani and various Ukrainian supporters of his, including Yuriy Lutsenko, all of whom support various conspiracy theories related to the Trump–Ukraine scandal. During the report, Rion stated without evidence that the liberal philanthropist George Soros had shown up at the Kyiv airport with "human Dobermans in little black Mercedes" to find them—a claim that was ridiculed in Ukrainian and American media. Soros was not known to have visited Ukraine since 2016.

In January 2020, OAN named Rion its chief White House correspondent after Emerald Robinson left the company.

In July 2020, the media watchdog Media Matters reported that Rion had appeared on a streaming program that promotes the far-right conspiracy theory QAnon, where she asserted Q's existence and said, "Q is anonymous for a reason, for a very good reason, and I think that people need to respect that."

In October 2020, the Borat Twitter account posted footage of Rion and Borat Subsequent Moviefilm star Maria Bakalova, playing the role of the character Tutar, touring the White House press briefing room together and outside of the West Wing. Bakalova asks Rion "Why is all the fake journalist for the left and none on the right?" with the clip ending before Rion can answer.

In November, during the 2020 United States presidential election, Rion supported Donald Trump's false claims of voter fraud, specifically mail-in voting. She also has promoted QAnon conspiracy theories on the air. On November 12, 2020, Trump cited a report by Rion when baselessly accusing an election software maker as having "rigged" the election vote, despite the cybersecurity agency in his administration saying the election was secure.

Rion is the chief operating officer of Voices and Votes, a nonprofit co-operated by fellow OAN personality Christina Bobb. The organization donated $605,000 to support the 2021 Maricopa County presidential ballot audit. The organization also provided volunteers for the audit effort.

In July 2023, as first reported by Politico, Chanel Rion shifted into a new role for One America News Network as chief national investigator, leaving her role as chief White House correspondent.

==== COVID-19 pandemic coverage ====
In March 2020, Rion hosted Exposing China's Coronavirus: The Fears, the Lies and the Unknown on OAN. During the special, Rion called the SARS-CoV-2 coronavirus, which caused the COVID-19 pandemic, the "Chinese virus". She said that President Donald Trump's response to the pandemic has been "strong" and questioned if the virus came from Wuhan, China, suggesting that there are "clues" that the virus was created in a laboratory in North Carolina. For the latter claim, Rion cited information from a "citizen investigator and a monitored source amongst a certain set of the DC intelligence community" who was actually a Twitter conspiracy theorist. As she described this individual during a televised report from the White House grounds, an image was displayed of actor Keir Dullea in the film 2001: A Space Odyssey. Rion also asserted that Anthony Fauci, the nation's leading expert on infectious diseases, had funded the creation of COVID-19.

During a White House Coronavirus Task Force press briefing on March 19, Rion asked Donald Trump if he thought the term "Chinese food is racist because it is food that originated from China." Trump responded "I don't think that's racist at all." Rion followed up suggesting "major left-wing media" had partnered with China to promote "communist party narratives" regarding the coronavirus. Criticism from across the political spectrum was leveled at Rion for the question, which was derided as a "softball" question. During the March 30 Task Force briefing Rion compared "children who are killed by their mothers through elective abortions each day" to the increasing number of Americans dying from the coronavirus.

On April 1, 2020, the White House Correspondents' Association removed OAN and Rion from the White House briefing room press briefings due to violating the Association's COVID-19 attendance policy. The policy, set forth by the Association and based on the Centers for Disease Control COVID-19 guidelines, allows only 14 reporters in the briefing room daily and that all reporters occupy a seat. Correspondents are rotated to ensure all gain access to the briefing while maintaining safe social distancing guidelines. On March 31 and April 1, Rion attended both press briefings when OAN was not on the rotation list. OAN president Charles Herring stated that Rion was invited to participate in the press briefings outside of the White House Correspondent's Association rotation list. Rion stated that she was a guest of White House press secretary Stephanie Grisham. The next day, on April 2, Rion returned to the White House briefing room, again, citing Grisham's invitation.

Rion's August 2020 reporting featured unfounded QAnon claims that pandemic-related shutdowns were increasing human trafficking.

=== Publishing career ===
Rion self-publishes political cartoons under the label "The Left Edge". She began drawing political cartoons in 2017. The illustrations often promote right-wing political conspiracy theories, including Pizzagate and that Hillary Clinton killed Seth Rich. Her work also criticizes public figures, including Harry Reid and James Comey.

As of 2014, she worked as managing editor at a small publishing press owned by her sister Channing that published works by the Ryan family. She has written young adult fiction novels for young women.

== Legal issues ==
In December 2020, OAN and Rion were included as defendants in a defamation lawsuit by Dominion Voting Systems executive Eric Coomer, alongside other outlets such as Newsmax and The Gateway Pundit. Coomer asserted that the defendants had characterized him as a "traitor" and that as a result he was subjected to "multiple credible death threats". OAN and Rion reached a settlement with Coomer in August 2023.

In August 2021, Rion was named in a $1.6bn defamation lawsuit by Dominion against OAN for promoting false claims that it had engaged in election fraud during the 2020 United States presidential election.

In December 2021, Rion was named in a defamation lawsuit by former Georgia election workers Ruby Freeman and her daughter Wandrea' ArShaye Moss against OAN for broadcasting conspiracy theories about them engaging in voter fraud. A settlement was reached in April 2022.

== Personal life ==
Rion and Sykes traveled across the United States following Donald Trump during the 2016 presidential election, attending rallies and other campaign events.

In 2017–2018, Sykes unsuccessfully sought the Republican nomination for a Senate seat in Missouri on a pro-Trump, America First platform.
