= One America News Network =

American far-right pay television news channel

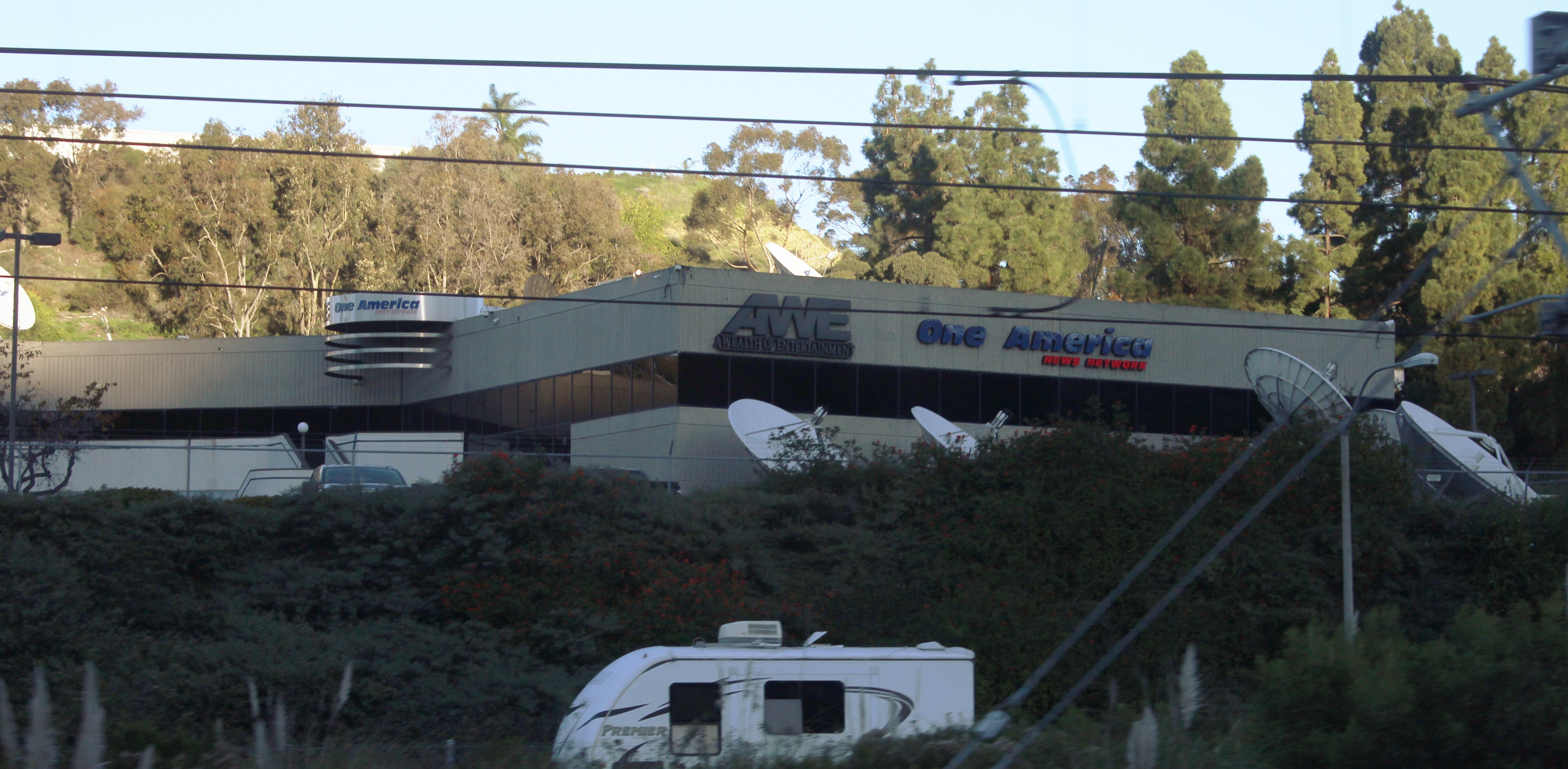
- Country: United States
- Broadcast area: Nationwide
- Headquarters: 4757 Morena Blvd., San Diego, California 92117, U.S.

Programming
- Language: English
- Picture format: 1080i HDTV (downconverted to letterboxed 480i for the SDTV feed)

Ownership
- Owner: Herring Networks
- Sister channels: AWE

History
- Launched: July 4, 2013; 13 years ago

Links
- Website: www.oann.com

Availability

Streaming media
- Digital media receiver: Amazon Fire TV; Roku; Apple TV
- Service(s): Sling TV, YouTube TV

One America News Network (OANN), also known as One America News (OAN), is a far-right news and political commentary television channel and website founded by Robert Herring Sr. and owned by Herring Networks, Inc., that launched on July 4, 2013. The network is headquartered in San Diego, California, and operates news bureaus in Washington, D.C., and New York City.

The company said in 2019 OAN was available in 35 million homes and that its audience ranged from 150,000 to as large as 500,000, though that year Nielsen Media Research estimated its viewership to be about 14,000. By July 2022, the network was available only to a few hundred thousand people who subscribed to smaller cable providers.

In 2019, Robert Herring Sr. testified in court that the network was created at the urging of executives of AT&T, which through its subsidiary DirecTV has since been the source of up to 90% of the network's revenues. DirecTV stopped carrying OAN in 2022.

The network's prime-time political talk shows have a conservative perspective, and the channel has described itself as one of the "greatest supporters" of Donald Trump. Trump has promoted both the network and some of its hosts. The channel is known for promoting falsehoods and conspiracy theories.

== History ==
OAN was announced on March 14, 2013, by Herring Networks, Inc., an independent media company founded in 2003 by conservative businessman Robert Herring, Sr. The OAN channel originally debuted in partnership with The Washington Times, a conservative daily newspaper founded by the Unification Church from South Korea. Herring said in 2013 that under OAN's agreement with The Washington Times, the new network could use any Times content, but was not obligated to do so; he also said at the time that between 60 and 65 Herring Broadcasting employees spent "most of their days" on One America.

Herring told the 2013 Conservative Political Action Conference that "Fox News has done a great job serving the center-right and independent audiences", but that the audience's alternative news sources lacked variety.

Reuters reported in October 2021 that it had reviewed court documents showing the network was created in 2013 at the urging of executives of AT&T, which has since been the source of up to 90% of the network's revenues. In a 2020 deposition, a company accountant testified that lacking a contract with AT&T subsidiary DirecTV, the network's value "would be zero." Court documents showed the network promised to "cast a positive light" on AT&T during newscasts.

In July 2014, OAN relocated its news and production studios from the Washington Times building to 101 Constitution Avenue NW, near the Capitol.

At the beginning of 2020, it was reported that Trump allies were looking into purchasing OAN.

In November 2020, YouTube suspended OAN for one week and ended its ability to monetize its existing content as a first strike under its three-strike community guideline violation policy for advertising a false cure for COVID-19.

As of April 2021, its YouTube channel had close to 1.5 million subscribers. Approximately 150 employees worked at its San Diego headquarters.

DirecTV said in January 2022 that it would not renew its contract with Herring Networks, which expired in April 2022, affecting OAN and its sister channel AWE, which would be removed from DirecTV's satellite and U-verse TV services. In response, OAN host Dan Ball said that OAN "is now at war with AT&T" and urged viewers to dig up "dirt" on AT&T board chairman William Kennard. The channels were dropped from DirecTV on April 4, 2022; some staff members left the network for other employment.

Verizon Fios, OAN's largest remaining carrier, notified its customers on July 21, 2022, that it could not come to terms to renew its contract with OAN and would remove the network from its service in nine days. August 1, 2022 was OAN's final day on cable or satellite, marking the end of OAN's availability on major carriers. OAN commentator Pearson Sharp said on-air that OAN was dropped because Verizon is a "radical Marxist" corporation.

In December 2024, following former congressman Matt Gaetz's withdrawal from his nomination to United States Attorney General by Donald Trump due to allegations of sexual assault, it was announced that Gaetz would be joining OAN to host a new show every weekday starting in January 2025. In November 2025, OAN fired Vish Burra, a booker and scriptwriter for OAN's The Matt Gaetz Show who had shared antisemitic content on X.

On May 7, 2025, Kari Lake announced that OAN will provide news coverage for Voice of America. The network was added nationwide to Spectrum systems in July 2025.

== Programming ==
Shows airing on OAN include: Tipping Point with Kara McKinney, Real America with Dan Ball, Weekly Briefing with John Hines, Fine Point with Chanel Rion, The Real Story with Riley Lewis and Nights with Chris Boyle.

In August 2014, OAN launched the show On Point with Tomi Lahren. Many clips from the program went viral, and by 2015 Lahren had gained widespread attention for her commentaries. On August 19, 2015, Lahren aired her final show at OAN. On the week of August 24, 2015 former Republican vice presidential candidate Sarah Palin guest-hosted a program on the network.

In 2019, the channel aired Claws of the Red Dragon, an NTD Canada-produced docufilm with Steve Bannon as its American distributor.

== Content ==
OAN is known for its pro-Donald Trump content, promotion of conspiracy theories such as election tampering in November 2020, and criticisms of the mainstream media. OAN has described itself as one of the "greatest supporters" of Trump. It has been described as a political propaganda outlet.

Former producer Martin Golingan said in 2021, "The Herrings run OAN on this McDonald's business model where you keep the customer happy and the business runs itself. If the customers happen to be crazy conspiracy consumers, then that's what they're selling. They are grifters in the outrage culture".

=== Sources ===
After the network's establishment, CEO Robert Herring started sending the news team must-run stories from far-right websites such as Breitbart News, InfoWars and The Gateway Pundit.

A former OAN producer testified in a defamation lawsuit against the network by former Dominion Voting Systems executive Eric Coomer that he and his colleagues were directed to use The Gateway Pundit as a source. A January 2021 email from the news director encouraged producers to read stories from The Gateway Pundit, The Blaze and The Epoch Times for inspiration.

=== Pro-Trump content ===
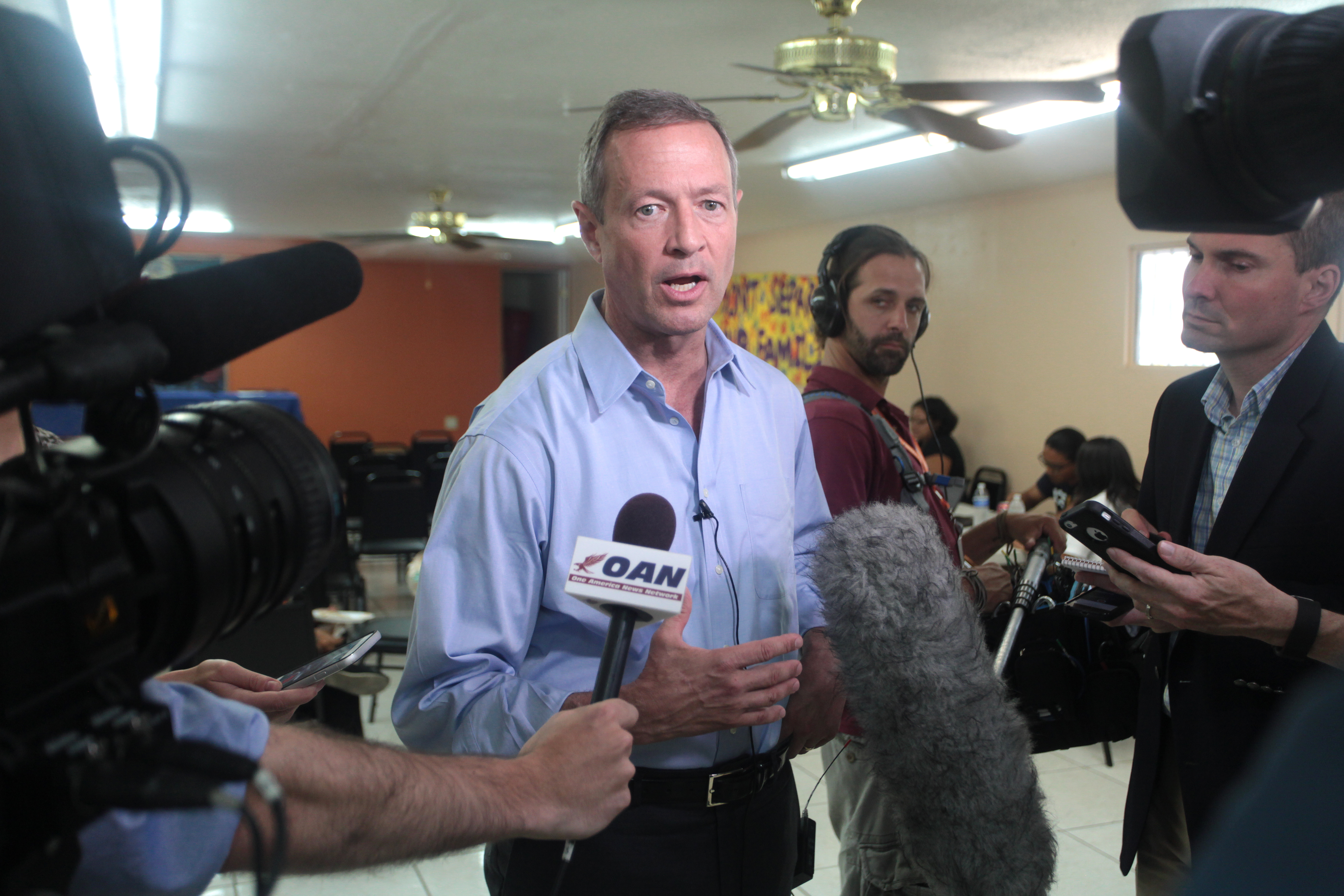
Former Governor Martin O'Malley of Maryland being interviewed by One America News at an immigration roundtable at The Puente Human Rights Movement in Phoenix, Arizona in 2015

OAN is pro-Trump. The father of Charles Herring, Robert Herring Sr., founder and CEO of the network, has ordered producers to promote pro-Trump stories, anti-Clinton stories, and anti-abortion stories and to minimize stories about Russian interference in the 2016 presidential election. Herring prohibited the network from running stories about polls that did not show Trump in the lead during the 2016 election. Former producer Marissa Gonzales said in 2021, "If there was any story involving Trump, we had to only focus on either the positive information or basically create positive information. It was never, never the full truth."

During the 2016 presidential campaign, the channel ran a special titled Betrayal at Benghazi: The Cost of Hillary Clinton's Dereliction and Greed. Herring, the owner of the channel, sent his producers a report that falsely claimed that Hillary Clinton had a brain tumor and asking them to check up on it. He also shared a report with producers claiming that Planned Parenthood had promoted abortion and ordered them to minimize coverage of Pope Francis's US visit owing to the Pope's calls for action on global warming. Herring also repeatedly ordered his producers not to cover stories pertaining to Russian interference in the 2016 presidential election.

According to former and current employees at the channel as well as internal e-mails, by July 2017 the executives of the channel had directed the channel to "scuttle stories about police shootings, encourage antiabortion stories, minimize coverage of Russian aggression, and steer away from the new president's troubles."

In October 2017, the channel claimed without evidence that a "report" had been published that showed "U.K. Crime Rises 13% Annually Amid Spread of Radical Islamic Terror". Trump later repeated this falsehood, suggesting that he learned of it from OAN.

In June 2017, OAN was granted a permanent seat in the White House's James Brady briefing room. The network's Chief White House Correspondent, Trey Yingst, was one of the top five most called-upon reporters covering the Trump administration. Trump has been repeatedly called for questions from OAN during press conferences, including in February 2017 when Yingst asked the president about his campaign's contacts with the Russian government. Also in February 2017, OAN was invited to a network lunch with Trump. In August 2017, Trump praised OAN, saying: "It's a great network". In response, OAN CEO Robert Herring said that OAN considers itself a tough but fair presence in the White House press corps.

OAN supported the Trump administration's revocation of CNN reporter Jim Acosta's press credentials; most major media outlets, including the conservative Fox News, opposed this decision. In a statement, Robert Herring attacked Fox News, saying he "can't believe Fox is on the other side."

Rudy Giuliani has promoted conspiracy theories related to the Trump–Ukraine scandal on OAN.

On January 12, 2020, an OAN broadcast promoted debunked conspiracy theories alleging illegal wiretapping of Trump. OAN broadcasts all of Trump's speeches uninterrupted.

In August 2020, OAN tweeted a promotion for a television segment entitled "America Under Siege: The Attempt to Overthrow President Trump." The tweet asserted that ongoing demonstrations in the aftermath of the George Floyd killing constituted a "coup attempt" that was "led by a well funded network of anarchists trying to take down the President." Trump retweeted the message.

On February 11, 2021, after Trump had left office, OAN aired a "tribute to his accomplishments" set to a reading of Rudyard Kipling's poem "If—". The video was credited to Harrison Hill Smith, an InfoWars contributor.

In March 2024, the network promoted a false story claiming that Michael Cohen was the one who had carried out an affair with Stormy Daniels and that he had used it to "extort" the Trump Organization. The network reached a legal settlement with Cohen in April, acknowledging that the original story was false.

=== Roy Moore sexual misconduct report controversy ===
After The Washington Post reported in November 2017 allegations that Alabama Senate candidate Roy Moore had made unwanted sexual advances toward teenagers when he was in his thirties, OAN "became a source of both positive coverage and stories that could cast doubt on his accusers." In November 2017, OAN aired a segment citing a false rumor by an anonymous Twitter account that The Washington Post had offered $1,000 to Roy Moore's accusers. OAN described the tweet as a "report" and described the tweeter as a "former Secret Service agent and Navy veteran". The Twitter source had a history of tweeting falsehoods and conspiracy theories; the Twitter account had also made repeated and inconsistent lies about its identity, including appropriating the identity of a Navy serviceman who died in 2007. After it was revealed that the story was a hoax, OAN did not retract its report.

During his Senate campaign, Roy Moore cited OAN when he defended himself against the accusations, including an OAN story that alleged his "Accusers Have Ties to Drug Dealers & Washington Post".

During the night of the Alabama Senate election, OAN announced that Moore had swept the election "by a large margin" when in actuality Moore had lost the race. In its announcement, the network cited "unofficial polling", and the news anchor extended OAN CEO Robert Herring's congratulations to Moore on having run a "fine campaign." OAN's website also published an erroneous article claiming Moore had won "despite attacks from Democrats about unverified allegations." During election night, OAN also reported "a number of people have been caught trying to sneak into voting booths and vote illegally"; however, Alabama Secretary of State's office said it had no credible reports of voter fraud.

=== Conspiracy theory about David Hogg ===
In February 2018, one of the hosts on OAN tweeted a conspiracy theory that David Hogg, a 17-year-old survivor of the Stoneman Douglas High School shooting, had been coached to speak against Trump by, and was "running cover" for, his retired FBI agent father. Donald Trump Jr. "liked" the OAN host's tweet. The younger Hogg responded, describing the conspiracy theory to BuzzFeed News as "immature, rude, and inhuman."

=== Syria chemical attack ===
In April 2018, while on an al-Assad regime-led tour of the area of the Douma chemical attack, an OAN correspondent claimed there was no evidence that a chemical attack had occurred. The correspondent said, "Not one of the people that I spoke to in that neighborhood said that they had seen anything or heard anything about a chemical attack on that day" and that residents "loved Bashar al-Assad."

In May 2019, OAN published a report claiming that the White Helmets had admitted to staging fake chemical weapons attacks intended to put blame on the Assad regime. OAN referred to the humanitarian organization, which is partly funded by the US State Department, as "terrorist-linked". The Daily Beast described this story as a smear that could be traced directly as Russian disinformation. A CNN report about declassified intelligence regarding Russian propaganda also said the OAN report had spread Russian propaganda and falsehoods, while quoting an intelligence official who stressed that Western targets of Russian propaganda are often "unaware who is essentially seeding these narratives".

=== Conspiracy theorist Jack Posobiec ===
Alt-right conspiracy theorist Jack Posobiec was employed by OAN as a political correspondent from 2018 to 2021. Posobiec was a prominent proponent of the Pizzagate and murder of Seth Rich conspiracy theories.

In September 2018, Posobiec interviewed Microchip, the alias of a pro-Hitler online poster, on OAN without indicating Microchip's affiliations, according to the Southern Poverty Law Center. The SPLC said the two men had worked together in spreading disinformation for several years, including the false claims propagated in Pizzagate. In 2020, during the George Floyd protests in Buffalo, New York, Posobiec falsely reported and promoted another unsubstantiated conspiracy theory regarding pipe bombs.

=== Russia ===
OAN is known for downplaying threats posed to the United States by Russia. According to a former OAN producer, on his first day at OAN he was told, "Yeah, we like Russia here." One of OAN's reporters, Kristian Brunovich Rouz, simultaneously works for the Russian propaganda outlet and news agency Sputnik, which is state-owned; when Rouz runs favorable segments on OAN that relate to Russia, OAN does not disclose that he also works for Sputnik. Rouz compiled a wholly fabricated story that OAN ran in 2017, which alleged that Hillary Clinton's political action committee secretly gave $800,000 to "antifa." In May 2020, Rouz created a segment for OAN in which he claimed "mounting evidence of a globalist conspiracy" involving the Clintons, Soros, Bill Gates, Anthony Fauci, and the Chinese government. No evidence exists for any of this.

In September 2019, OAN parent Herring Networks sued MSNBC host Rachel Maddow (as well as Comcast, MSNBC and NBCUniversal Media) for $10 million in federal court, after Maddow said the network "literally [is] paid Russian propaganda" on her July 22, 2019 program (when she referred to a Daily Beast article identifying Rouz as working for Sputnik). The court dismissed the suit, finding the claim was not defamation, but that a "reasonable viewer" would recognize it as a reasonable summation of the article published by The Daily Beast. In February 2021, Herring Networks was ordered to pay Maddow and MSNBC $250,000 legal fees in an anti-SLAPP ruling. OAN's appeal of the ruling was denied by a three-judge panel of the Ninth Circuit Court of Appeals in August 2021. The panel decided that Maddow's statement was "an obvious exaggeration, cushioned within an undisputed news story", and thus not defamation.

=== Chanel Rion ===
In 2019, OAN hired Chanel Rion as a correspondent. Rion previously worked as a political cartoonist, promoted murder of Seth Rich conspiracy theories, and wrote an anti-feminist children's book; Rion also praised a book by a Holocaust denier. In October 2019, she claimed without evidence that former FBI lawyer Lisa Page and former FBI Deputy Director Andrew McCabe were involved in an affair. OAN later retracted the story.

In January 2020, OAN named Rion its chief White House correspondent. In April 2020, Rion was expelled from the White House Correspondents' Association and her formal seat was removed for flagrantly violating newly implemented social distancing rules in the James S. Brady Press Briefing Room. Despite this, Rion has boasted she was personally invited to attend by the Trump White House's press secretary, Stephanie Grisham, a day after the ban.

=== False claims about George Soros ===
OAN has run stories falsely claiming that George Soros, a Hungarian-born American philanthropist, collaborated with the Nazis when he was a 14-year-old. The network has also accused Soros of funding migrant caravans to the United States.

During a report from Ukraine with Rudy Giuliani, in December 2019, OAN correspondent Chanel Rion claimed without evidence that Soros had shown up at the Kyiv airport with "human Dobermans in little black Mercedes" to find them. The claim was ridiculed in Ukrainian and American media. Soros was not known to have visited Ukraine since 2016.

=== COVID-19 pandemic conspiracy theories ===
OAN has promoted hydroxychloroquine as a "miracle cure" for COVID-19, blaming a "massive disinformation campaign" by "Big Tech" and the "Chinese-controlled" World Health Organization for it not being recommended as such.

In March 2020, during the COVID-19 pandemic, the OAN chief White House correspondent Chanel Rion promoted a conspiracy theory that the virus originated in a North Carolina lab, citing information from a "citizen investigator and a monitored source amongst a certain set of the DC intelligence community" who was actually a Twitter conspiracy theorist. As she described this individual during a televised report from the White House grounds, an image was displayed of actor Keir Dullea in the film 2001: A Space Odyssey. She also asserted that Anthony Fauci, the nation's leading expert on infectious diseases, had funded the creation of COVID-19. Rion later claimed without evidence that other mainstream media outlets were parroting Chinese Communist Party propaganda. During a press conference with Trump, she asked him whether it was "racist" to use the term "Chinese food"; accused "major left-wing news media" of "consistently siding with foreign state propaganda, Islamic radicals and Latin gangs and cartels" as well as "Chinese Communist Party narratives"; and asked the president whether it was "alarming" that media "work right here at the White House with direct access to you and your team?"

In May 2020, OAN host Liz Wheeler claimed without evidence that "mainstream media pretended there was a deadly surge in COVID cases" after the 2020 Wisconsin Spring election. PolitiFact rated the claim "Pants on Fire", having found that there were no references to a "surge" in their review of state and national articles about the election, and that reports had accurately listed the number of COVID-19 cases potentially related to the election.

In November 2020, YouTube suspended OAN's channel's ability to upload videos for one week and demonetized its channel for violating YouTube's policy against promoting COVID-19 misinformation, after OAN uploaded a video advertising a fake cure for COVID-19. OAN responded that "The video was 'unlisted' on YouTube for review by internal OAN staff only", accused YouTube of a First Amendment violation, and stated that the video was republished on the OAN website.

In September 2022, OAN reported on a declaration by a group of scientists and doctors claiming that the COVID-19 vaccines were causing an "international medical crisis". The fact-checking website Health Feedback noted that OAN did not acknowledge that the claims made in the declaration had previously been fact-checked and found to be inaccurate, unsupported or misleading.

=== George Floyd protests ===
In June 2020, during protests against racism and police brutality in the wake of the murder of George Floyd, OAN reporter Jack Posobiec falsely claimed that there were pipe bombs planted at the Korean War Memorial in Washington D.C., and that "federal assets [were] in pursuit". There were no pipe bombs, nor is there any evidence that any "federal assets" pursued it.

==== Buffalo police shoving incident ====
In June 2020, OAN claimed, without evidence, that an elderly protester who had been seriously injured by police "was attempting to capture the radio communications signature of Buffalo police officers" and was linked to the antifa movement. Referencing OAN's unfounded conspiracy theory, Trump later tweeted that the protester "could be an ANTIFA provocateur." OAN's Kristian Rouz provided no evidence for these claims, referring only to The Conservative Treehouse, an anonymously written right-wing blog. That afternoon, Herring Sr. tweeted to Trump, "we won't let you down as your source for credible news!" On June 13, protesters in San Diego, California gathered outside OAN headquarters, where Herring Sr. challenged the crowd to prove the story was false.

=== 2020 US presidential election ===
In the months after the 2020 United States presidential election, OAN extensively amplified false claims of election fraud and promoted conspiracy theories related to the election. Five days after the Associated Press had called the election for Joe Biden, OAN continued to insist that Donald Trump had won, and OAN continued to refer to Trump as "President Trump" (while referring to Biden as simply "Biden" or "Joe Biden") for months after the January 2021 inauguration of Joe Biden as President.

Christina Bobb, an OAN anchor, was present in the Willard Hotel "command center" where top Trump associates worked to prevent Joe Biden's election from being certified. Rudy Giuliani said in an October 2021 deposition that Bobb had to run stories she developed past the Trump campaign so that they "didn't violate any of our rules or whatever". The Washington Post reported in January 2022 that Bobb worked with Giuliani and other Trump campaign officials in December 2020 to execute a plan for Republicans in seven states to create fraudulent certificates of ascertainment to falsely assert Trump had been reelected.

OAN saw growth in its audience as a result of its election coverage. It was boosted in particular by Donald Trump, who expressed disapproval of Fox News' reporting on the presidential election and encouraged his supporters to instead watch OAN or Newsmax TV, another conservative channel promoting election falsehoods.

Reuters reported in October 2021 that on the day of the attack on the Capitol by Trump supporters, an OAN news director emailed staff: "Please DO NOT say 'Trump Supporters Storm Capitol...' Simply call them demonstrators or protestors...DO NOT CALL IT A RIOT!!!" The next day, Herring emailed news producers: "We want to report all the things Antifa did yesterday. I don't think it was Trump people but lets investigate." The FBI has not found evidence of antifa involvement.

==== Dominion Voting Systems ====
Top: Coverage of Dominion Voting Systems on January 1, 2021. Bottom: OAN scrubs all references to Dominion Voting Systems after Dominion filed a defamation lawsuit against Sidney Powell.

OAN was a major promoter of the conspiracy theory that Dominion Voting Systems had manipulated vote totals to ensure the victory of Democratic candidate Joe Biden. OAN spent months alleging manipulation by Dominion, advanced claims that Dominion employees had colluded with antifa activists, aired a fictitious map allegedly seized by the US Army from election servers in Germany showing Donald Trump had received 410 electoral votes, and hosted interviews with Trump allies claiming that Dominion was part of an international communist conspiracy. Some of these claims were later amplified by Donald Trump, including a false assertion made on OAN that millions of votes for Trump were switched to votes for Joe Biden (a claim that originated on TheDonald.win, a pro-Trump website); Trump also tweeted out an OAN segment in which Ron Watkins, a far-right conspiracy theorist and administrator of 8chan (the website famous for its close connection to the QAnon conspiracy theory), was falsely characterized as an expert on election issues as he promoted conspiracy theories about Dominion.

OAN later removed all references to Dominion and Smartmatic, another company falsely accused of voter fraud, from its website without issuing public retractions after Dominion filed a $1.3 billion defamation lawsuit against Sidney Powell. However, on February 5, 2021, OAN aired Absolute Proof, a film produced by My Pillow CEO Mike Lindell that contained false claims and conspiracy theories about voter fraud in the election. Before the program, OAN showed a lengthy disclaimer asserting that the claims were Lindell's alone, but that the 2020 election results "remain disputed and questioned by millions of Americans." The disclaimer was seen as an attempt to avoid litigation from Dominion and Smartmatic.

On August 10, 2021, Dominion sued OAN for "knowingly and continuously" spreading false election fraud narratives, for a minimum of $1.6 billion.

==== Russian disinformation ====
The US intelligence community report with a reference to "... a documentary that aired on a US television network in late January 2020"

On January 25, 2020, OAN aired a film titled The Ukraine Hoax: Impeachment, Biden Cash, and Mass Murder. In March 2021, the United States intelligence community released an analysis which found that proxies of Russian intelligence "made contact with established US media figures and helped produce a documentary that aired on a US television network in late January 2020" as part of a broad effort to promote and launder misleading or unsubstantiated narratives about Joe Biden "to US media organizations, US officials, and prominent US individuals, including some close to former President Trump and his administration."

==== Promotion of executions ====
In June 2021, OAN personality Pearson Sharp falsely stated in an on-air monologue that "the simple facts point to massive and widespread problems with voting integrity" and "there have been numerous indications that foreign governments including China and Pakistan, meddled in our election to install Joe Biden as president," continuing: "What are the consequences for traitors who meddled with our sacred democratic process and tried to steal power by taking away the voices of the American people? What happens to them? Well, in the past, America had a very good solution for dealing with such traitors: Execution...The bottom line is that no one is above the law. And let this be a warning to anyone who thinks they are. The consequences are clear. And those responsible will be brought to justice for their role in undermining America's democracy."

Followers of the QAnon conspiracy theory shared video of the monologue, which buttressed their belief that a "storm" was coming in which Satan-worshiping pedophiles who oppose Trump would be rounded up and executed.

==== Arizona election audit ====
Trump lost Arizona and its most populous county, Maricopa, in the 2020 election. Arizona Senate Republicans, holding the senate majority and led by Karen Fann, asserted possible fraud and hired private firms to conduct an audit of Maricopa balloting. OAN broadcast extensive coverage of the audit, which was widely criticized across the political spectrum. Bobb and Rion formed a 501(c)(4) social welfare organization to raise funds for the effort, promoting it on the air. The audit ultimately found no proof of fraud and that Biden's margin of victory was actually slightly higher.

=== Doxing and harassment of New York Times journalist ===
On March 18, 2021, OAN aired a segment which contained the phone number of New York Times reporter Rachel Abrams, who they claimed was "fishing for information" from disgruntled OAN employees for a "hit piece" and called on viewers to "stand up to intimidation by the left" by contacting Abrams. OAN also posted a tweet with the number on its Twitter account, which was deleted after more than 6 hours by Twitter for violating its rules on personal and private information. On April 18, 2021, Abrams published an article in The New York Times, which cited interviews with current and former OAN employees stating that the channel had broadcast reports they considered to be "misleading, inaccurate or untrue", and that some employees were hoping the channel would be sued by Dominion Voting Systems, which it later was. Marty Golingan, one of the employees who was interviewed, was fired by OAN after the article was published.

== Reception ==
In March 2015, University of Southern California media professor Marty Kaplan praised the network for its focus on what he viewed as impartial news reporting, writing in The Huffington Post, "Ten minutes of OAN tells me eight stories; 10 minutes of Fox or MSNBC tells me one story, to make me mad," while commenting that OAN's opinion segments were "as delusional and incendiary as anything on conservative talk radio or Fox." He has since expressed a different view of the network, telling Columbia Journalism Review that, where once the talk shows were "sand traps" in a "large field of green", the network "fairly quickly" became "more like the Sahara". Don Kaplan (no relation to Marty) of the New York Daily News echoed similar sentiments to Marty Kaplan's initial view, writing in December 2016 that, "it's by far one of the most fair news outlets around, serving up a daily diet of ad-free, non-ideological, nonstop news—without smirking, snarky anchors or much fanfare" while stating that its opinion segments "skew hard to the right."

In July 2017, Marc Fisher wrote in The Washington Post that the network was "a reliably sympathetic voice of the [Trump] administration's goals and actions". In July 2018, Media Matters for America criticized OAN host Liz Wheeler for advancing conspiracy theories relating to the Planned Parenthood 2015 undercover videos controversy and other abortion topics and tying tangentially related news stories to the "so-called liberal hypocrisy on abortion." In 2019, the English Wikipedia deprecated OAN, along with The Gateway Pundit and The Daily Caller, with the consensus for OAN being that it publishes "falsehoods, conspiracy theories, and intentionally misleading stories".

In an April 2020 Last Week Tonight segment, John Oliver called the channel "a combination of far-right wing talking points and dirt-stupid reporting," criticizing its hosts, methods, ideology, accuracy, promotion of unfounded conspiracy theories, and closeness to the Trump administration. That November, journalist Karl Bode described the channel as "a cornerstone of America's growing disinformation problem" and "a rotating collection of wobbly conspiracies and gibberish that has more in common with a state-run disinformation network than a credible news organization."

In 2022, the Global Disinformation Index described OAN as having a high risk of disinformation due to "publishing no information regarding its policies to ensure accuracy (fact-checking, etc.) or attribute authorship, or about its ownership structure, which is a risk-factor for conflicts of interest and/or editorial interference." The misinformation tracker NewsGuard has categorized OAN as an unreliable source of information.

== Ratings ==
In June 2019, OAN said it was available in 35 million homes and its audience ranged from 150,000 to as large as 500,000, though Nielsen Media Research estimated its viewership that year to be about 14,000. The company does not subscribe to Nielsen, citing its high fees, so regular audience estimates are not available.

== Litigation ==
In February 2021, a federal judge awarded $250,000 to MSNBC in an anti-SLAPP counter suit to OAN's $10 million lawsuit claiming that they had been defamed by Rachel Maddow. The judgment ruled that OAN's initial suit was frivolous and required OAN to pay all legal fees incurred by MSNBC.

In March 2022, OAN sued AT&T and DirecTV for $1 billion after DirecTV announced in January that it would be dropping the network in April, alleging that the decision was "part and parcel of a larger, coordinated, extremely well-financed political scheme to take down Herring and unlawfully destroy its ability to operate in the media business". OAN also alleged that AT&T and DirecTV violated a confidentiality provision by telling the press about the agreement expiration, and that AT&T "disparaged OAN in violation of the Affiliation Agreement", pointing to CNN airing "reports and commentary that falsely accused OAN of contributing to the events of January 6, 2021, and engaging in 'disinformation' campaigns" and John Oliver criticizing OAN on Last Week Tonight. In January 2023, most of OAN's claims were dismissed, but the judge did rule that Herring had "adequately alleged a breach of the confidentiality provision" and "would at a minimum be entitled to nominal damages".

=== 2020 election lawsuits ===
In December 2020, OAN was included as a defendant in a defamation lawsuit by Dominion Voting Systems executive Eric Coomer, alongside other outlets such as Newsmax and The Gateway Pundit. Coomer asserted that the defendants had characterized him as a "traitor" and that as a result he was subjected to "multiple credible death threats". OAN reached a settlement with Coomer in August 2023.

In August and November 2021, the channel was sued by Dominion Voting Systems and Smartmatic for promoting false claims that the companies had engaged in election fraud during the 2020 presidential election.

In December 2021, former Georgia election workers Ruby Freeman and her daughter Wandrea' ArShaye Moss filed a defamation lawsuit against OAN and several of its senior executives, among others. In the complaint, Freeman and Moss alleged that OAN broadcast stories which falsely accused them of conspiring to produce secret batches of illegal ballots and inserting them into the voting machines to help Joe Biden win the 2020 US presidential election. Due to the alleged false accusations, Freeman and Moss said that they "have become the objects of vitriol, threats, and harassment". In April 2022, they reached a settlement agreement with OAN and weeks later the network aired a pre-recorded 30-second segment acknowledging that its allegations were false.

In January 2024, court filings from Smartmatic's defamation lawsuit against OAN revealed that OAN president Charles Herring had sent an email with a spreadsheet claimed to contain the passwords of Smartmatic employees to Sidney Powell on January 8, 2021. Smartmatic lawyers said the email exchange showed that OAN executives "may have engaged in criminal activities" because they "appear to have violated state and federal laws regarding data privacy." Herring also solicited additional information from the anonymous tipster who provided the spreadsheet. Another court filing indicated that CEO Robert Herring had also sent a similar spreadsheet to Mike Lindell. A settlement was reached in April 2024.

== Notable personalities ==
=== Current ===
- Matt Gaetz
- Stella Inger
- Chanel Rion

=== Former ===
- Christina Bobb
- Natalie Harp
- Tomi Lahren
- Corey Lewandowski
- Emily J. Miller
- Jack Posobiec
- Emerald Robinson
- Liz Wheeler
- Trey Yingst

== See also ==
- Cyberwarfare by Russia
- List of conspiracy theories
