= Liz Wheeler =

American conservative political commentator (born 1989)

Elizabeth Wheeler
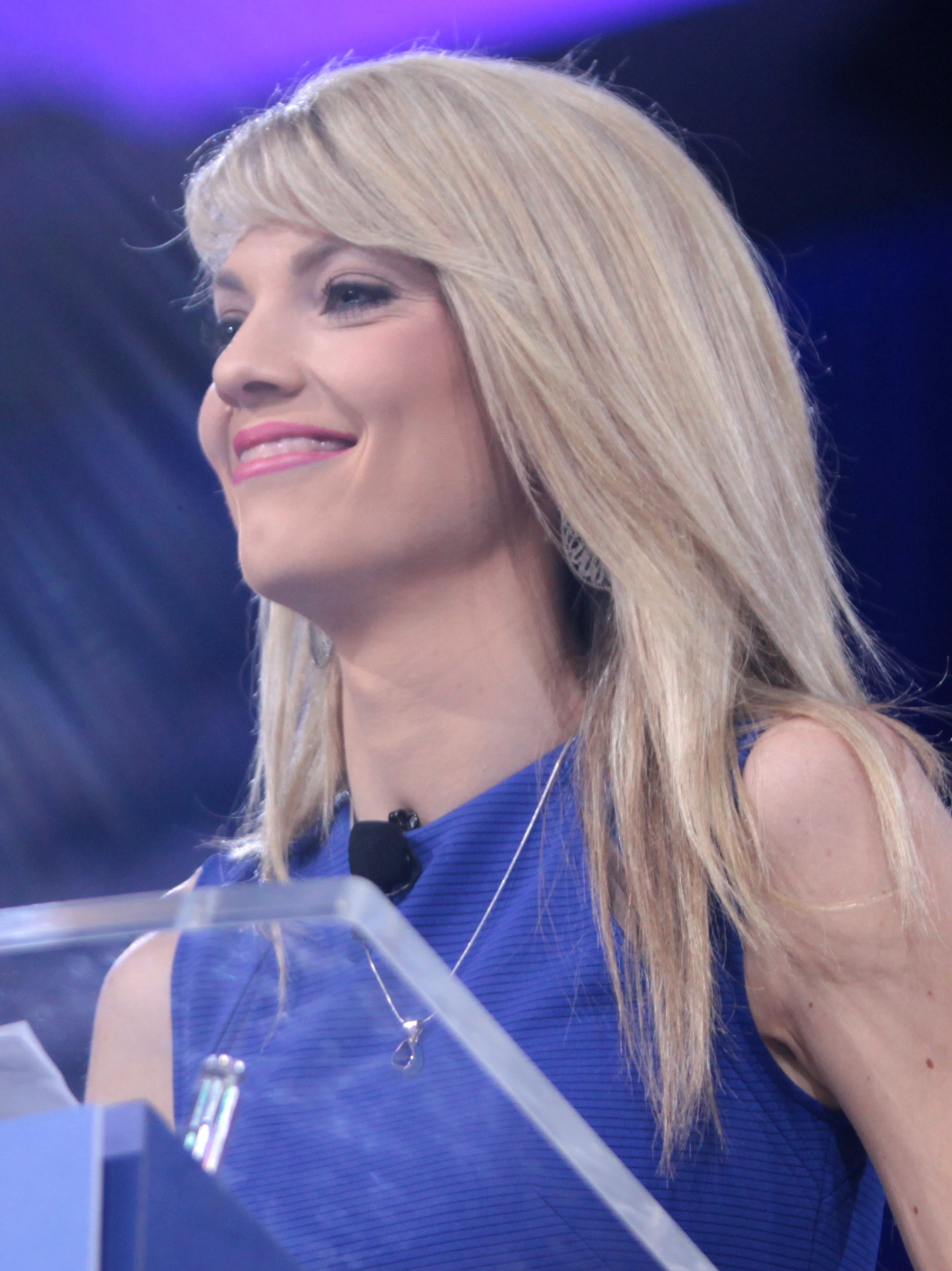
- Wheeler at the 2016 Conservative Political Action Conference
- Born: July 12, 1989 (age 37); Sharonville, Ohio, U.S.
- Education: Pennsylvania State University
- Occupations: Podcast host; Conservative political commentator; Author
- Employer: One America News Network (2015–2020)
- Notable work: Tipping Points: How to Topple the Left's House of Cards
- Political party: Republican
- Spouse: Daniel Moyer (m. 2017)
- Children: 2
- Website: lizwheelershow.com

Elizabeth Theresa Wheeler (born July 12, 1989) is an American conservative political commentator, author, and podcast host. From 2015 to 2020, she hosted One America News Network (OANN)'s Tipping Point with Liz Wheeler, where she was known for her finale segment, "Final Point". In 2019, Wheeler published her first book, Tipping Points: How to Topple the Left's House of Cards. In September 2020, Wheeler left OANN and currently hosts a podcast, The Liz Wheeler Show.

== Career ==
In 2013, Wheeler at age 24 partnered with 13 other young conservatives to co-author and publish Young, Conservative, & Why It's Smart to Be Like Us. The book went to No. 2 on Amazon's Civics Books List.

On October 26, 2015, Wheeler was introduced as the host of the primetime talk show Tipping Point with Liz Wheeler, which aired weeknights at 9 PM ET/6 PM PT on One America News Network (OANN).

Wheeler spoke at Conservative Political Action Conference (CPAC) in 2016. She speaks at Young America's Foundation events. In 2018, Wheeler was profiled by Politico magazine as a "titan" of conservative media alongside Ben Shapiro, Sean Hannity, Laura Ingraham, Mark Levin, Tucker Carlson, Dana Loesch, and others. In the Politico profile, Wheeler said she chose a career in political media because: "We're at a point that we're replacing God with government. So, instead of debating theology, instead of debating family, we're looking at government and looking to politics for the answers—and that's why everyone is so obsessed with it."

In a 2018 segment on OANN, Wheeler claimed that a proposed California bill would ban the sale of Bibles. Snopes determined that the claim was a misrepresentation; the bill actually targeted gay conversion therapy.

In 2019, Regnery Publishing published Wheeler's first book, Tipping Points: How to Topple the Left's House of Cards. In 2020, President Donald Trump issued a tweet encouraging his followers to "buy the book" and "give Liz great reviews."

In a May 2020 segment on OANN, Wheeler claimed that "mainstream media pretended there was a deadly surge in COVID cases" after the 2020 Wisconsin Spring election. PolitiFact rated the claim "Pants on Fire", having found that there were no references to a "surge" in their review of state and national articles about the election, and that reports had accurately listed the number of COVID-19 cases potentially related to the election. At OANN, Wheeler denounced Black Lives Matter protesters as "trained Marxists".

In September 2020, Wheeler announced her departure from OANN.

On May 25, 2021, Wheeler premiered her podcast, The Liz Wheeler Show. In an episode posted on June 30, 2021, Wheeler falsely claimed that a "peer reviewed, scientific study showed that the COVID-19 vaccine causes two deaths for every three lives it saves." The video was flagged by Facebook as part of its efforts to combat misinformation, and PolitiFact found that the MDPI Vaccines journal, which had published the study, had posted a notice raising serious questions about it two days prior to the episode being uploaded. The notice called the study's conclusions a "misrepresentation of the data" and stated that the authors' assertion that the deaths were caused by vaccination efforts was "incorrect and distorted".

In March 2022, Wheeler falsely claimed that hepatitis B vaccination in newborns was unsafe and unnecessary unless the mother was infected with the hepatitis B virus, and that the vaccine failed to prevent infection by the time vaccinated people became sexually active. In January 2023, following football player Damar Hamlin's in-game collapse, Wheeler promoted a conspiracy theory that the COVID-19 vaccine was responsible for a "surge" in athlete deaths and injuries.

== Personal life ==
Wheeler is a practicing Roman Catholic. In September 2017, she married Daniel Moyer. They had their first child, a daughter, in February 2021. Their second daughter was born in April 2024.
