= 2021 Maricopa County presidential ballot audit =

Examination of 2020 election ballots

Map of Maricopa County, Arizona, the jurisdiction for which ballots were audited

The 2021 Maricopa County presidential ballot audit, commonly referred to as the Arizona audit, was an examination of ballots cast in Maricopa County during the 2020 United States presidential election in Arizona initiated by Republicans in the Arizona State Senate and executed by private firms. Begun in April 2021, the audit stirred controversy due to extensive previous efforts by former president Donald Trump and his allies to overturn the election, and due to assertions of rule violations and irregularities in the conduct of the recount, leading to claims that the audit was essentially a disinformation campaign. In June 2021, Maggie Haberman of The New York Times and Charles Cooke of National Review reported that Trump had told associates that based on the results of the audit, he would be reinstated as president in August 2021.

From the beginning of the audit, several concerns surfaced, including how the audit was being conducted, its legality, the conduct of auditors, and security issues at the site. The audit spawned interest in pursuing similar efforts in other states, causing the United States Department of Justice to warn Republican legislatures of potential violations of federal law. Conspiracy theory issues also arose as many commentators across the political spectrum characterized the effort as a sham or "fraudit" that was an element of the false claim that the presidential election had been stolen from Trump.

The auditors released a report in September 2021, finding no proof of fraud and that their ballot recount increased Biden's margin of victory by 360 votes.

== Background ==
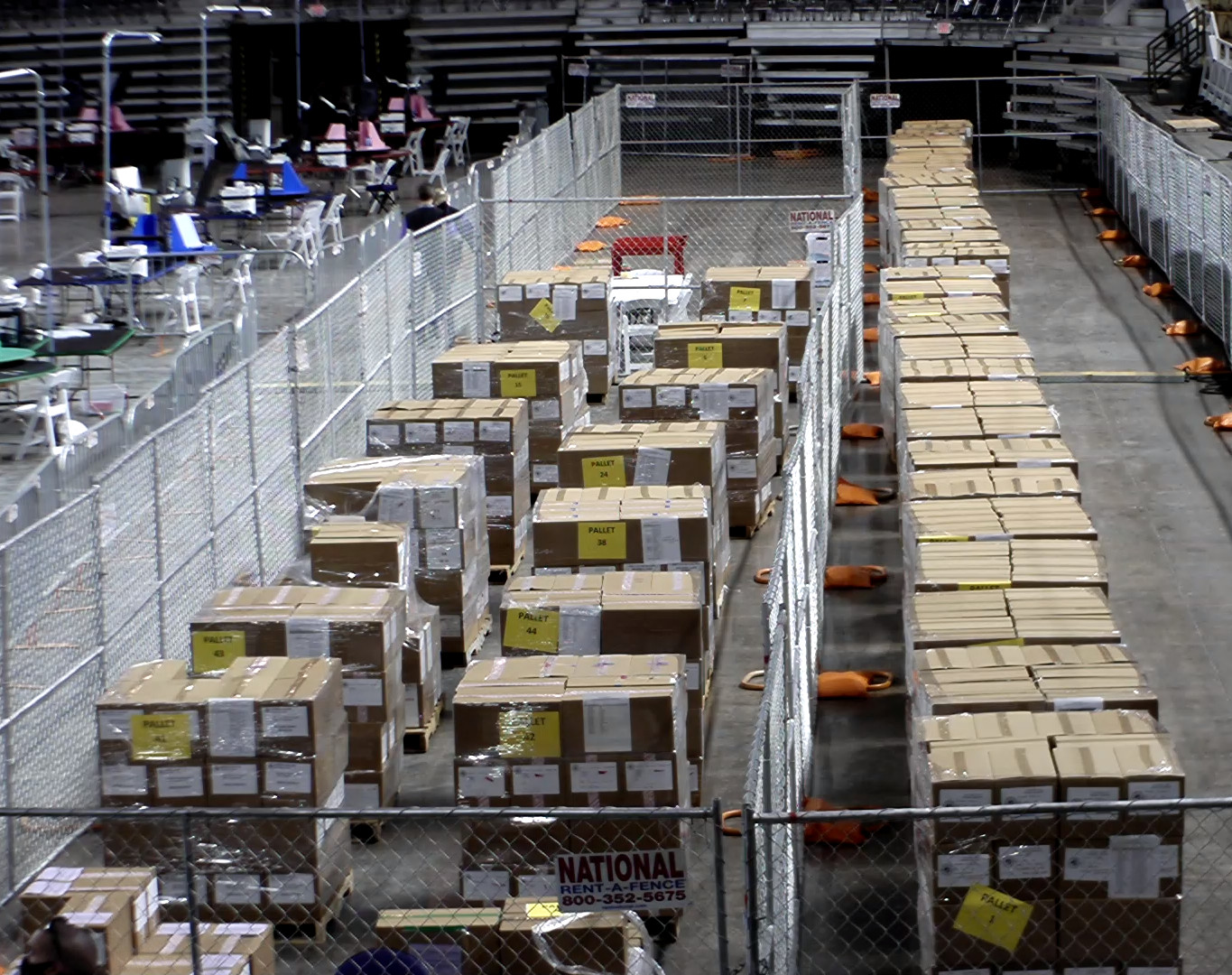
The approx. 46 pallets with 2.1 million paper ballots to be recounted and examined

After the 2020 presidential election was called for Biden, Trump and his allies made many allegations of election fraud that were dismissed by numerous state and federal judges, election officials, governors, and government agencies as completely baseless. Multiple congressional Republicans, as well as governors and other elected officials, refused to acknowledge Biden's victory. The Trump campaign and its allies filed at least 63 lawsuits, including to the Supreme Court, all of which were rejected. Trump pressured Republican officials in key states to block the certification of votes. Trump also pressured the Justice Department to challenge the election results. The Justice Department and Department of Homeland Security found no evidence of significant election fraud. Trump's failed efforts preceded the January 6 attack on the U.S. Capitol.

Trump was only the second Republican presidential nominee to lose Arizona since 1948, losing the state by 10,400 votes. This was due almost entirely to Biden carrying Maricopa County, by far the state's largest county (it has over 61 percent of the state's population) by 45,000 votes, the first time a Republican had lost the county in 72 years. After the Associated Press and Fox News declared Biden the winner in Arizona as ballot counting continued, Trump and Arizona Republican Party chair Kelli Ward sought to intervene, with Ward sending a text message to a Republican election official to say she had spoken with Trump and "We need you to stop the counting." She also asked the official to contact Trump attorney Sidney Powell, adding, "I know you don't want to be remembered as the guy who led the charge to certify a fraudulent election."

In Maricopa County, no discrepancies had been found in either a hand count audit on November 4, 2020, nor in an additional physical hand recount of 47,000 ballots (2% of election-day ballots plus 5,000 early voting ballots) conducted from November 7 through November 9, 2020. On February 23, 2021, Maricopa County announced that forensic audits of their vote tabulation equipment by two independent auditors accredited by the federal Election Assistance Commission had found no irregularities. At the State Senate Judiciary Committee's hearing on December 14, 2020, the Republican Chairman of Maricopa County's Board of Supervisors testified with the County's Elections Director and state officials from the Attorney General's Election Integrity Unit. They all testified there was no evidence that Joe Biden's win was achieved by fraud, manipulation or tampering. The County's Elections Director further noted that the vote-counting machines aced every test.

On March 31, 2021, the Arizona Senate Republican caucus, led by Senate President Karen Fann, hired four firms to examine the ballots in Maricopa County in the races for President and for the United States Senate, with Florida-based company Cyber Ninjas being the lead firm. Cyber Ninjas' owner, Doug Logan, is a Trump supporter and a proponent of Trump's false claims of voter fraud. The process involved an audit to search for evidence of fraud, and a hand recount of the 2.1 million ballots cast in Maricopa County. The hand recount was managed by Wake Technology Services, which reportedly had been hired for a previous audit in a rural Pennsylvania county by Trump attorney Sidney Powell, who has promoted numerous conspiracy theories about the election. The firm works primarily in the healthcare sector with little to no experience with elections.

The Arizona Republicans provided $150,000 of funding from the State Senate operating budget, while nearly $5.7 million was provided by five groups spearheaded by Trump supporters seeking to delegitimize the 2020 election results, including lawyer Sidney Powell, and the following other persons. Patrick Byrne, the former CEO of Overstock.com and promoter of 2020 election conspiracy theories, donated one million dollars to the effort and created a website to raise further funds, which was promoted by former Trump national security advisor Michael Flynn. The fundraising was conducted through a 501(c)(4) organization, a tax code provision intended primarily for the promotion of social welfare. One America News Network (OANN) personalities also created a dark money organization to raise funds, while providing extensive coverage of the audit that drew praise from Trump. Senator Wendy Rogers, who supported the claims that Trump had won the election in Arizona as well as nationally, extensively promoted the audit on social media.

== Conduct and concerns ==
Kelly Townsend former House Elections Committee chair who had a long history in Arizona platforming claims of rigged voting machines dating back over a decade to 2010 when she led the Suprise Arizona Tea Party meeting, publicly pushed for a forensic audit on her social media beginning in 2017 and Townsend played a substantial role in spreading conspiracies surrounding Sharpies and a conspiracy that counterfeit ballots were flown in on planes which Townsend promoted widely on her various social media in late 2020 leading to the audit.

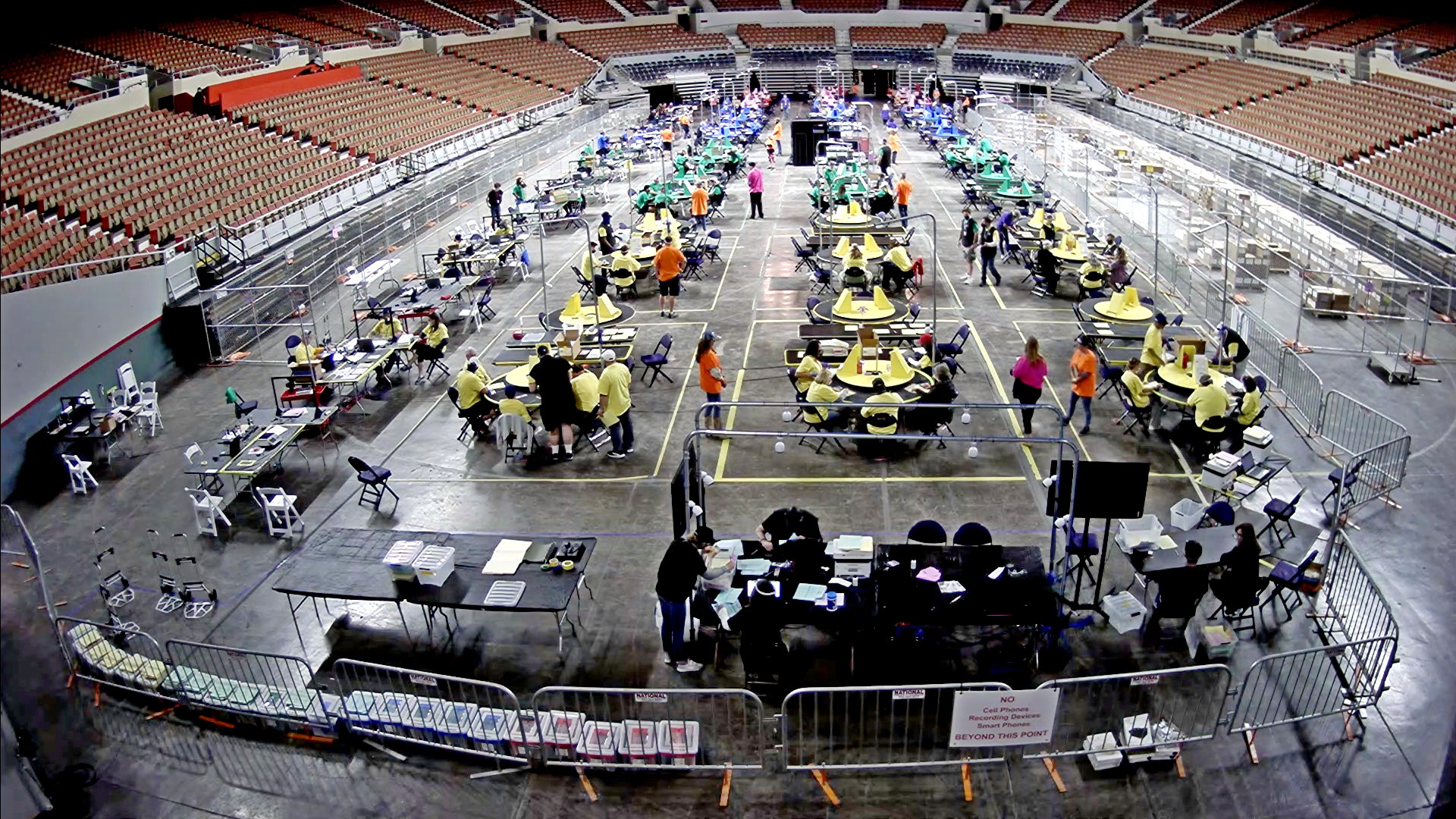
Maricopa Audit at full speed on May 6, 2021

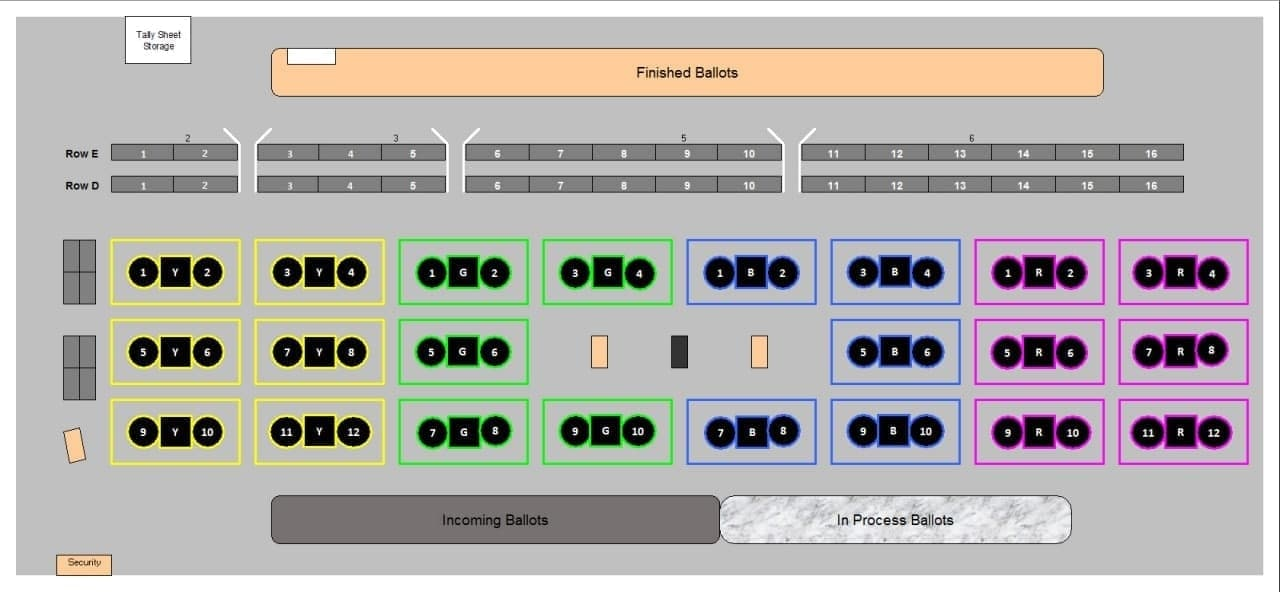
Layout of counting and examining tables on the arena floor on May 25, 2021

Townsend led a Stop the Steal rally promoting Sidney Powell outside the Arizona Capitol on November 14, 2020, and was a named witness in Powell's legal filings which a judge cited as being filled with unfounded claims. In 2020, before and even following the audit, Townsend continued promoting and espousing various conspiracy theories that Townsend spread widely before being named as an unindicted co-conspirator in the criminal case surrounding the alternate electors brought by Attorney General Kris Mayes in 2023.

The audit began on April 22, 2021, and was expected to last 60 days. That day, Arizona Senate Democrats filed a lawsuit to stop the audit. The next day Judge Christopher Coury agreed to suspend the audit for three days until the contractors presented documentation on how they would conduct the audit. The suspension was conditioned on the Arizona Senate Democrats posting a $1 million bond to cover the cost that the delay could cost the Arizona State Senate Republicans. But because the Arizona State Senate Democrats refused to post the bond, the suspension did not go into effect. By May 5, Arizona Senate Democrats reached a settlement with the Arizona Senate Republicans to allow independent elections experts to observe the audit. The agreement authorized Arizona Secretary of State Katie Hobbs to file suit against Cyber Ninjas for breach of contract if the company did not live up to the agreement.

Former Arizona Secretary of State Ken Bennett, a Republican, had been designated as the State Senate's liaison to the audit. On May 5, 2021, Hobbs sent a letter to Bennett, detailing additional concerns with the way the audit was being conducted. Her letter cited the audit's disclosed procedures (departures from and ignorance of best practices for hand recounts) and the reports of the observers sent from the Secretary of State's office (including sloppy handling of ballots). A response from the audit's official Twitter account asserted that Hobbs's allegations were "baseless claimes [sic]."

Also on May 5, the United States Department of Justice sent Karen Fann, president of the Arizona State Senate, a letter expressing concerns that the audit might violate federal laws. One concern was that the law requires election officials to maintain custody of all voting records for up to 22 months. Another concern was that the statement of work for Cyber Ninjas authorized Cyber Ninjas to knock on voters' doors to ask them if they had voted in the 2020 elections, which might amount to voter intimidation and constitute a violation of the Voting Rights Act of 1965. After the Department of Justice threatened to sue over this plan, Cyber Ninjas agreed not to do it.

The Arizona Republic reported in May that because Arizona Senate Republicans had given private companies and individuals unfettered and unmonitored access to voting machines, the county might need to expend significant funds and time to ensure the equipment would meet federal, state and local requirements for certifying and protecting election equipment. Hobbs, the Secretary of State, later informed the Board of Supervisors that election technology and security experts, including at the federal Cybersecurity and Infrastructure Security Agency (CISA), unanimously advised her that the machines should not be reused in future elections because no methods exist to adequately secure them. The auditors also requested the county provide network routers, though election security experts said this presented a security threat and there was no evident reason the auditors needed them. Bennett said auditors needed the routers to see if the election management system (EMS) was connected to the internet during the election, though a county official said the auditors already had other means to perform that check. Independent forensic audits before and after the election found the system was not connected to the Internet, and county officials said it never had been. Sellers said it might cost as much as $6 million if the county had to replace the routers because their integrity could no be longer assured after they were given to the auditors. The County Board of Supervisors voted on July 14 to spend $2.8 million to replace voting equipment that the auditors had accessed.

=== June 2021 ===
On June 2, Hobbs issued a report detailing observations made to that point by election observers from her office, alleging various infractions on the part of the auditors. These included leaving security gates open, leaving confidential materials unattended, and bringing "prohibited items including cellphones and pens with black or blue ink" to the counting floor. In particular, black and blue ink pens are prohibited because they can be used to modify ballots that were cast.

The objectivity of the audit has been called into question due to the involvement of Logan. Additionally, Anthony Kern, a former Republican state lawmaker who was present at the 2021 storming of the United States Capitol, was seen tallying votes. Kern, who was himself named on the ballots as a would-be Trump presidential elector as well as running for re-election to the Arizona House of Representatives, was subsequently removed from the group with access to the ballots. Former Republican Secretary of State Ken Bennett continued advising the audit, and Hobbs, the current Secretary of State, criticized Bennett's efforts, saying he needs to "either do it right, or don't do it at all."

The audit has produced division among Arizona Republicans. After initially supporting the audit, on May 9 Paul Boyer, a member of the Arizona State Senate Republican caucus, criticized the audit, saying "it makes us look like idiots." The Maricopa County Board of Supervisors, which is dominated by Republicans, also opposed the audit. On May 17, the board held a hearing and sent Fann a twelve-page letter to dispute her allegations of wrongdoing by county officials. Republican board chairman Jack Sellers stated that the allegations were actually due to the incompetence of the auditors and accused Fann of an "attempt at legitimatizing a grift disguised as an audit." Fann, however, continued to support the audit, and sent the Board of Supervisors a four-page letter stating that "serious issues" had arisen during the audit. Arizona Republican Party Chairwoman Kelli Ward released multiple videos about the audit, in which she criticized the Board of Supervisors and raised "the possibility of placing the validity of the entire 2020 election into question." Townsend continued pushing for legislative changes that gave legitimacy to Logan's findings including allegations that election workers should be arrested and Arizona voters should stay committed to election denialism, a claim Townsend reiterated on stage at a Florence, Arizona Trump rally in January 2022. A poll conducted at the end of March found that 78.3% of Arizona Republicans believed "that there was significant voter fraud in the 2020 United States Presidential Election which compromised the integrity of the election."

It was reported in June 2021 that a Cyber Ninjas subcontractor had transported copies of voting systems data to a supposed "lab" in Bigfork, Montana. The exact nature of the data and what efforts had been taken to keep it secure was unclear. A CNN reporter traveled to the location listed in property records for the subcontractor and found a cabin in a wooded non-commercial area.

In late June 2021, the Monmouth University Polling Institute reported that a majority of Americans viewed this and similar audits as "partisan efforts to undermine valid election results".

The auditors announced on June 25 they had finished counting and photographing the 2.1 million ballots, and Bennett stated a final report would come in weeks or months. On July 9, Fann announced the Senate would conduct another ballot count as a check on the work done by Cyber Ninjas and the earlier count by county election officials.

=== July 2021 ===
On July 14, two House Democrats, Carolyn Maloney and Jamie Raskin, opened an investigation into Cyber Ninjas, sending a letter to Logan requesting documents and records of any communications between the company and Trump or his allies, as well as information on who was funding the audit. The next day, a Maricopa County judge ruled that all information relating to the audit were public records, including communications between the audit participants and information about who was financing the audit, rejecting an argument by Senate Republicans that information held by Cyber Ninjas and other private contractors were not subject to the Arizona public records law. The judge found that government officials could not shield information about their official activities by farming it out to private companies. Another judge and an appeals court agreed, and in September the Arizona Supreme Court declined to hear an appeal from Senate Republicans, requiring the documents to be released.

==== July 15 hearing on preliminary findings ====
On July 15, preliminary findings were presented by Doug Logan, Ken Bennett, and Ben Cotton in an Arizona Senate hearing led by Arizona Senate member Warren Petersen and Arizona Senate president Karen Fann. During the hearing, Logan incorrectly asserted the county had 74,243 "mail-in ballots" that had no record of being sent to voters, though he acknowledged the discrepancy could have been caused by record keeping errors. The incorrect information was quickly repeated by lawmakers and Republican commentators, echoing a similar false claim that had been made in Pennsylvania soon after the election. County officials and election experts said Cyber Ninjas had misinterpreted data files when examining mail-in ballot figures, leading to an incorrect conclusion. County officials said Logan did not appear to understand that early votes in the county were not cast solely through mail-in ballots, but that some early votes were cast at in-person voting centers. The in-person early votes would not see a record of being mailed to voters, since those ballots were provided directly at the in-person voting centers, rather than being sent to voters by mail. Tammy Patrick, who had been a federal compliance officer for Maricopa County elections for eleven years, said the auditors had examined early versions of the data that the county had provided to political parties to aid their get-out-the-vote efforts, but those early versions were not intended to and did not reflect the final official tallies.

Logan also noted about 168,000 ballots with faulty printing that caused the print on the front and back to be slightly misaligned, which he claimed could cause voters to cast ballots for the wrong candidate if voting machine ink bleeds through the ballot, or if a Sharpie marker is used. He said the voting machines used "a lot of very thin paper stock", though the paper was among the types recommended by the vendor of the voting machines that print completed ballots. An independent audit months before the election ran 1.5 million test ballots through the voting machines; two ballots jammed in the tabulators, but the test vote was found to be accurate. The county said it used 80lb Vote Secure paper for all mail-in and in-person ballots and, before the election, said it would provide polling places with fine-tipped Sharpies because they had the fastest-drying ink to minimize smudged ballots. Logan acknowledged the matter required further analysis, though election experts said bleed-through does not affect the vote count because of printing alignment issues, and a bipartisan process had been in place to flag and examine unreadable ballots. Logan also claimed to have an affidavit asserting that signature verification standards had been progressively relaxed during the election until "they were just told to let every single mail-in ballot through," which Republican county recorder Stephen Richer strongly denied, even though in 2019 leading up to the 2020 election, Richer himself while campaigning for his seat conducted a partisan audit airing unfounded election fraud claims with anecdotal evidence and affidavits. Neither county officials nor Arizona Senate Democrats were permitted to participate in Logan's presentation.

==== Post-hearing developments ====
Soon after Logan's presentation, Trump released three statements in which he made multiple false assertions regarding the findings. He falsely claimed the 168,000 ballots Logan had identified had been printed on illegal paper and were unofficial. He also characterized as "magically appearing ballots" the 74,243 mail-in ballot discrepancy that Logan had incorrectly found. Trump asserted that "all the access logs to the machines were wiped, and the election server was hacked during the election", though there was no evidence to support the claim. The county said that months before the election an individual had inappropriately downloaded publicly-available data from the county website; a forensic audit by two firms months before the election found the election management system was airgapped from the website and the internet. He then said the incidence of fraud and irregularities was many times more than would be needed to change the election outcome, though the number of identified potential fraud cases was far smaller than Biden's margin of victory. Trump echoed a claim Logan had made, stating "11,000 voters were added to the voter rolls AFTER the election and still voted," though this was explained by voters casting provisional ballots and later being added to the rolls after their eligibility to vote was confirmed.

On July 16, the auditors claimed they did not have enough information to complete their report, and requested that the Arizona Senate subpoena further records and survey tens of thousands voters at their residences. Logan said during the July 15 presentation that his assertions of a 74,243 mail-in ballot discrepancy, found to be incorrect, merited the household survey. Cyber Ninjas had in May agreed to not survey households, after the Justice Department threatened to sue over the practice.

A July Associated Press investigation found that Arizona election officials had identified 182 ballots out of 3.4 million cast statewide that were sufficiently problematic to be referred to investigators for further review. Four of those incidents had led to charges, two against Democratic voters and two against Republicans. A spokesman for Arizona Republican attorney general Mark Brnovich had said in April that 21 active investigations were underway, though he did not indicate how many related to the November 2020 election.

Fann expressed confidence in Cyber Ninjas, asserting "they are working with a number of other contractors that have experience in audits and in their expertise in their own fields." The Arizona Republic had reported in June that none of the contractors involved in the audit were certified by the federal Election Assistance Commission, while two firms that had conducted forensic audits for the county before the election were certified. In late July, Bennett confirmed that he was being shut out of the auditors' second ballot count because he questioned the lack of transparency in the processes being used, which he characterized as "hide-the-ball-from-me stuff". He said he believed an independent group should have conducted the second count after the auditors' first count did not match the official results. He added he had "indirectly...allowed some information that was supposed to be private to get out," referring to partial ballot count data given to an outside election auditing firm which found the Cyber Ninjas second count was a 99.9% match with the official count. The CEO of the outside firm said that if the difference was extrapolated to all 2.1 million ballots, the count would differ by 124 votes.

Trump chief spokesperson Liz Harrington often tweeted about the audit and, on July 26, she appeared on Special Report with Bret Baier on Fox News to falsely assert that Logan's analysis meant there were 275,000 "potential fraudulent ballots."

On July 26, the Republican Senate issued new subpoenas for the envelopes bearing signatures for mail-in ballots, as well as for all routers, and passwords and log-in information for the ballot tabulation devices. County officials had previously told the auditors that access to such equipment was unnecessary and posed a security threat, including possible access to sensitive information in the county sheriff's office. County supervisors and the election voting machine vendor, Dominion Voting Systems, refused to comply with most of the demands in the subpoenas days later, responding that much of the materials had already been provided under subpoenas months earlier. The supervisors also said some of the requested materials were held in the Recorder's office, which was not named in the subpoenas. The demand for routers was again flatly denied on security concerns. The supervisors noted the subpoenas had not been authorized by a Senate vote, while Dominion asserted the subpoena it received demanded information the company did not have and that it would take Cyber Ninjas to court to protect its proprietary rights. Fann responded she would grant more time for compliance while the auditors considered their options for gaining access to the routers and passwords. Senate Republicans and the Board of Supervisors reached a settlement on September 17 in which the demand for routers, network logs and the voter registration database would be withdrawn in exchange for the Board dropping its effort to recoup from the auditors the $2.8 million that had been authorized to replace voting equipment that had been potentially compromised by the auditors. The settlement called for a special master to arrange for an independent technology team to examine the routers and answer questions about how they were used in the 2020 election and how they will be used in future elections. The results of the examination, led by former Arizona Republican congressman John Shadegg, were released in March 2022, finding that the county's ballot tabulation system was never connected to the internet or any external devices. The team found there were actually no routers involved that required inspection and there was no evidence any data had been deleted or tampered with.

On July 27, Twitter suspended the audit's official account for violating rules regarding platform manipulation and spam.

Cyber Ninjas released a summary of its major donors on July 28, indicating $5.7 million was raised from five groups associated with individuals who had cast doubt on the presidential election, including Byrne, Flynn, and Powell, as well as OANN personalities Chanel Rion and Christina Bobb.

=== August 2021 ===
Arizona Attorney General Mark Brnovich stated that the Maricopa County Board of Supervisors violated state law by not complying with election audit subpoena. The Maricopa Board of Supervisors, in response, said that there was no violation, since the Senate lacked the power of enforcement when not in legislative session.

Concurrently, on August 3, a county judge enforced a previous ruling from July wherein he rejected the argument from Senate Republicans that they were immune from suits to release their audit records, ordering the records released immediately; the order was expected to be appealed to a higher court. On August 25, Maricopa County Superior Court Judge John Hannah ordered Cyber Ninjas to preserve all records of their audit for later public release.

=== September 2021 ===
On September 23, 2021, Maricopa County claimed that the report from the audit would show that Biden had indeed won the county. The New York Times has reported that draft versions of the report it had seen showed Biden to have won slightly more votes and Trump to have won slightly fewer than the official count had.

=== October 2021 ===
On October 12, 2021, independent auditors reported that the audit had missed 15% of the paper ballots. This finding was based on detailed information provided to the Senate. The ballot counts were based on machines which counted the stacks of paper ballots.

== Controversy ==
=== Conspiracy theory issues ===
Many commentators across the political spectrum characterized the effort as a sham or "fraudit" that was an element of the false claim that the presidential election had been stolen from Trump. As part of the audit, auditors looked for secret watermarks, machine-markings, and bamboo fibers within the ballots. The testing for bamboo fibers was proposed by J. Hutton Pulitzer, who claimed without any proof and any elections-related experience that his invented equipment called Kinematic Artifact Testing could prove or refute a conspiracy theory that counterfeit ballots were shipped from South Korea or mainland China. Congressman Gosar's top attorney staffer Tom Van Flien, among others associated with the Cyber Ninjas and then House Elections Chair Kelly Townsend, had deployed to Sky Harbor airport shortly following the election and attempted to stop a South Korean plane believing it to be stuffed with counterfeit ballots. Townsend spread and amplified the Korean Air conspiracy on her social media and in the hearing she participated in with Trump attorney Rudy Giuliani and Michael Flynn associate Phil Waldron. The audit was supposed to have concluded on May 14, but as of May 9, only 12% of the ballots were counted. The audit was being conducted at the main floor of the Arizona Veterans Memorial Coliseum, which was not available for this activity beyond the original target date. Consequently, the audit went on hiatus on May 14 and resumed on May 24.

Karen Fann made an allegation, later amplified by Trump in a May 15 post on his blog, asserting that Maricopa County election officials deleted the voting database after the election. Maricopa County Recorder Stephen Richer, a Republican who once aired and gave life to election fraud conspiracy theories conducting his own partisan audit in 2019 leading up to the 2020 election as he campaigned for office while working with election deniers and Trump campaign attorneys and staffers, then criticized Trump's post as "unhinged" in a tweet, stating he was examining the database on his computer at that moment, adding, "We can't indulge these insane lies any longer." The auditors later acknowledged they had been examining hard drives the wrong way and the database had not been deleted, though the CEO of a Cyber Ninjas subcontractor, Ben Cotton, later said he was "able to recover all of those deleted files." After he continued to repeatedly characterize the data as "deleted", without evidence, during a Senate hearing, Fann said she stood by that characterization but said she would not refer the matter to law enforcement because "we never said there was any wrongdoing."

Richer who worked closely with Trump campaign attorneys in 2019 as he conducted his own partisan audit of the 2018 election, airing unfounded election fraud claims, stated he received threats from individuals, and that threats against him multiplied after he changed gears in 2021 after taking office, pushing back on the false election fraud claims amplified by former Trump and Fann. One such threat resulted in federal charges against a Missouri public school employee. In 2024, the Department of Justice dismissed criminal charges against a man who had been charged with making the alleged threats against Richer shortly before going to trial, citing in the public court record as its reason for dismissal, "issues" that had later come to light surrounding the DOJ's witness, Richer. As DOJ seemed to imply in their court filing possible credibility issues involving Richer, when questioned about this Richer told reporters he wanted the case dismissed because he was not given enough sympathy as a victim. Attorneys for the accused sought to present at trial that Richer, whose wife is an Arizona DOJ prosecutor, was not afraid or intimidated as an election worker, something that needed to be proven for a criminal conviction based on threats, but was instead relishing and even seeking fame as a self proclaimed professional victim further evidenced by his antagonistic social media postings that went on for over two years, frequent media appearances, and speaking engagements that Richer sought out for secondary gains of fame and money, which the accuseds attorneys planned to present at trial before the DOJ dismissed the case.

In June 2021, it was reported that Trump had told associates that based on the results of the audit, he would be reinstated as president by August 2021.

By August, false assertions spread on the internet that fraud had been discovered in the form of "lost" and "ghost" ballots that would've assured a Trump victory. Some of the false claims originated with outspoken Trump supporter Mike Lindell, fake news website The Gateway Pundit and an Arizona real estate broker.

The Arizona vote audit report in September saw Trump have 261 fewer votes and Biden have 99 more votes than they had had in the previous official certified count.

=== Alleged mishandling of employee sexual harassment complaints ===
On July 1, 2021, KTVK reported that a former employee of the audit had spoken with them and claimed that the audit organizers had, for weeks, ignored sexual harassment complaints from her and several other employees, allowing recurrent incidents of harassment to persist. The employee provided the outlet with statements from seven witnesses and alleged victims who corroborated her account.

== Findings ==
Released on September 24, 2021, the audit results did not find proof of fraud to support allegations of a stolen election. The report did, however, identify several factors which the report characterized as anomalies. Maricopa County officials, including the Republican Chairman of the Board of Supervisors, criticized the report as "littered with errors & faulty conclusions". In his private text messages, Cyber Ninjas CEO Doug Logan admitted that he could not make sense of his own numbers and described the report as "screwy".

=== Vote count ===
The audit's report found that the auditors' ballot recount increased Biden's margin of victory by 360 votes compared to the official count. Cyber Ninjas asserted they found problems with election conduct and alleged widespread anomalies in the election count that set the result in doubt. The report called into question a total of 53,305 ballots for varying reasons, though it noted multiple times there could be legitimate explanations for discrepancies.

=== Other claims ===
The auditors misleadingly stated that voting data had been deleted from the EMS server just before their audit was set to begin. The data had actually been archived to permanent storage systems in February, before a county-commissioned audit was to begin, and no data were missing. The auditors also asserted that some voting equipment was connected to the Internet, citing a server in the Recorder's office, but county officials noted that server was not part of the EMS and maintained the EMS was not connected to the Internet. In its report, the auditors said 3,432 more ballots were cast than were shown in a file of voters provided by the county, but the county explained that certain government officials and others are excluded from that file for their personal security because the file contains home addresses. One audit team member, Shiva Ayyadurai, who is known to promote conspiracy theories and who had filed as a Republican candidate in the 2018 United States Senate election in Massachusetts, claimed to have found faulty or missing signatures on ballot envelopes that could have resulted in thousands of duplicate ballots being counted, though election workers contact such voters so they can "cure" the errors and their ballots can be counted. The county said no duplicate ballots were counted.

Ayyadurai also said he found 17,322 duplicate ballot envelope images, which he suggested might mean ballots had been counted more than once. However, election workers may take multiple images of a ballot envelope as the signature curing process proceeds with voters, and each envelope bears a barcode to track that process and ensure that only one ballot is counted per voter. Ayyadurai asserted the receipt of envelopes "surged right after the election was over," though state law allows election workers five business days after elections to cure signatures, so there was a spike in such activity for those who voted on or just before election day. During the curing process, a ballot may be recorded as received by mail more than once, but it is counted as a vote only once. Ayyadurai's analysis was mischaracterized on social media and alternative news sites as having found 17,322 duplicate ballots.

Auditors said they found 5,047 Arizona voters with the same names and birth years who potentially voted twice, including in Maricopa County. County officials countered that matching names and birth years was not unusual in a state with 7 million residents.

Cyber Ninjas identified as a "critical" issue that 23,344 voters had their ballots mailed to old addresses. The county responded there were numerous legal reasons for this, including that the voter served in the military, had recently moved but not yet updated their driver license address, or had requested a one-time temporary address. The auditors used a commercial database system to compare addresses, saying they found voters who had moved out of state or died before they voted, though that database system is not always accurate and the auditors conceded it was not comprehensive. The auditors said that "a number" of the 86,391 individuals they could not find in the database — which Trump characterized as "phantom voters" — "are in fact real people with a limited public record and commercial presence; but it is unclear how large that number is." Barry Burden, director of the Elections Research Center at the University of Wisconsin–Madison, said it was unclear how data were collected for the database.

Election workers can make a duplicate of a ballot that tabulation machines reject due to damage. Cyber Ninjas said it counted 2,592 more duplicated ballots than had originally been sent for duplication. County officials said they were confident the duplication process was accurate, pointing to a court case that affirmed the process that was used.

=== Hoax edited version of the report ===
An edited version of the report, which stated: "The election should not be certified, and the reported results are not reliable", was spread by QAnon and The Gateway Pundit, the latter of which baselessly claimed that the Arizona State Senate had pressured for the above line to be removed. Cyber Ninjas CEO Doug Logan has said that this edited report "is a false version" of the audit report, and that the notion that the Arizona State Senate had issued threats to suppress the edited report was "absolutely false". Arizona State Senate audit liaison Randy Pullen, a former chairman of the Arizona Republican Party, also stated that the edited report was "a fake document", and further said that "there was never a discussion about decertifying" the election. During an October 2021 podcast in which conservative activist Joe Oltmann was interviewing Doug Logan, Oltmann admitted to being the person who released the edited version of the report.

== Aftermath ==
The United States House Committee on Oversight and Reform held a hearing on the audit on October 7, 2021. Logan had declined an invitation to attend; in her September letter inviting him, committee chairwoman Carolyn Maloney wrote she had not received the Cyber Ninjas documents she had requested from him in July. Bennett, Sellers and Gates attended. In his testimony, Bennett stated that auditors found several areas where election laws or procedures "were or may have been" violated. He repeated the incorrect claim that files had been deleted, which Gates clarified was actually due to auditors looking in the wrong place for the files. Republican committee member Andy Biggs of Arizona falsely stated "we don't know" who won the presidential vote in Arizona. Logan had stated that his audit could not conclude if there was fraud in the mail-in ballots, just that it was "highly suspicious."

On October 8, the county Elections Department and Recorder's office released a preliminary "top line" analysis of the auditor's report, finding it repeatedly made faulty claims. The preliminary analysis was to be followed by a deeper analysis.

In November 2021, the Arizona State Senate released financial records indicating the audit cost nearly $9 million, generating an operating loss of over $2 million. The records did not include income and expenses for Cyber Ninjas. The Senate contributed $50,000 of the $150,000 it had authorized. In November, Vice quoted Nick Moseder, who spread election disinformation on social media, saying Logan told him he was $2.1 million in debt due to the audit. Asked in October if he would conduct an audit for another state, Logan said, "If in prayer, the Lord told me to do it, I would do it again. Otherwise, no, I would not be inclined to, and quite frankly, it's not because of the left, it's because of the right," adding he had received many messages from Trump supporters accusing him of "not doing enough, that I did not put enough on the line." Attorney Lin Wood, who according to court records, appeared as co-counsel in Powell's Arizona election fraud case, confirmed to reporters that in November 2020, he hosted Doug Logan and at his ranch in South Carolina known as Tomotley along with Sidney Powell, Michael Flynn, Patrick M. Byrne, and James "Jim" Penrose, while Arizona lawmaker Alexander Kolodin acted as local Counsel, and Kelly Townsend a named witness in Powell's Arizona election fraud case as the group collaborated on lawsuits and plans to pursue audits and access voting machines in Arizona. Doug Logan and Jim Penrose were later identified as persons of interest in the alleged breach of voting machines in Michigan along with other allies of Flynn and Powell, in December 2020 and in Coffee County Georgia in January 2021.

In January 2022, Cyber Ninjas announced it was shutting down, as a Maricopa County judge imposed a $50,000 contempt fine on the company for every day it refused to hand over documents as it had been ordered to do months earlier. Logan continued to challenge the order to release the records as the cumulative fines exceeded $2 million by March. Because Cyber Ninjas was insolvent and facing dissolution, a Superior Court judge agreed the sanctions were toothless and ruled that Logan and his wife could be held personally responsible for relinquishing the records.

After a six-month investigation, Arizona attorney general Mark Brnovich, a Republican running for Senate in 2022, said in April 2022 that he found no proof of 2020 election fraud in Arizona. His report said "serious vulnerabilities" had been identified, though findings by his investigators which contradicted that were omitted. A more complete report by Brnovich's office, which was withheld until after Brnovich left office in January 2023, found that none of the allegations of election fraud had merit.

After the government watchdog organization American Oversight sought audit-related records under Arizona's public records law, the Arizona Senate released about 22,000 records, totaling more than 80,000 pages, but also withheld or redacted more than 1,000 other records in whole or in part on grounds of legislative privilege, which was challenged in litigation. In August 2022, the Arizona Supreme Court ruled in Fann v. Kemp that certain communications concerning the audit could be withheld from public disclosure under the asserted privilege.

In March 2026, during the second presidency of Donald Trump, Arizona Senate President Warren Petersen (a Republican) received a federal grand jury subpoena for records from the audit. He turned the records over to the FBI.

== See also ==
- United States presidential elections in Arizona
- 2020 Arizona elections
- 2020 United States presidential election
- Post-election lawsuits related to the 2020 U.S. presidential election from Arizona
