= Christina Bobb =

American lawyer (born 1982)

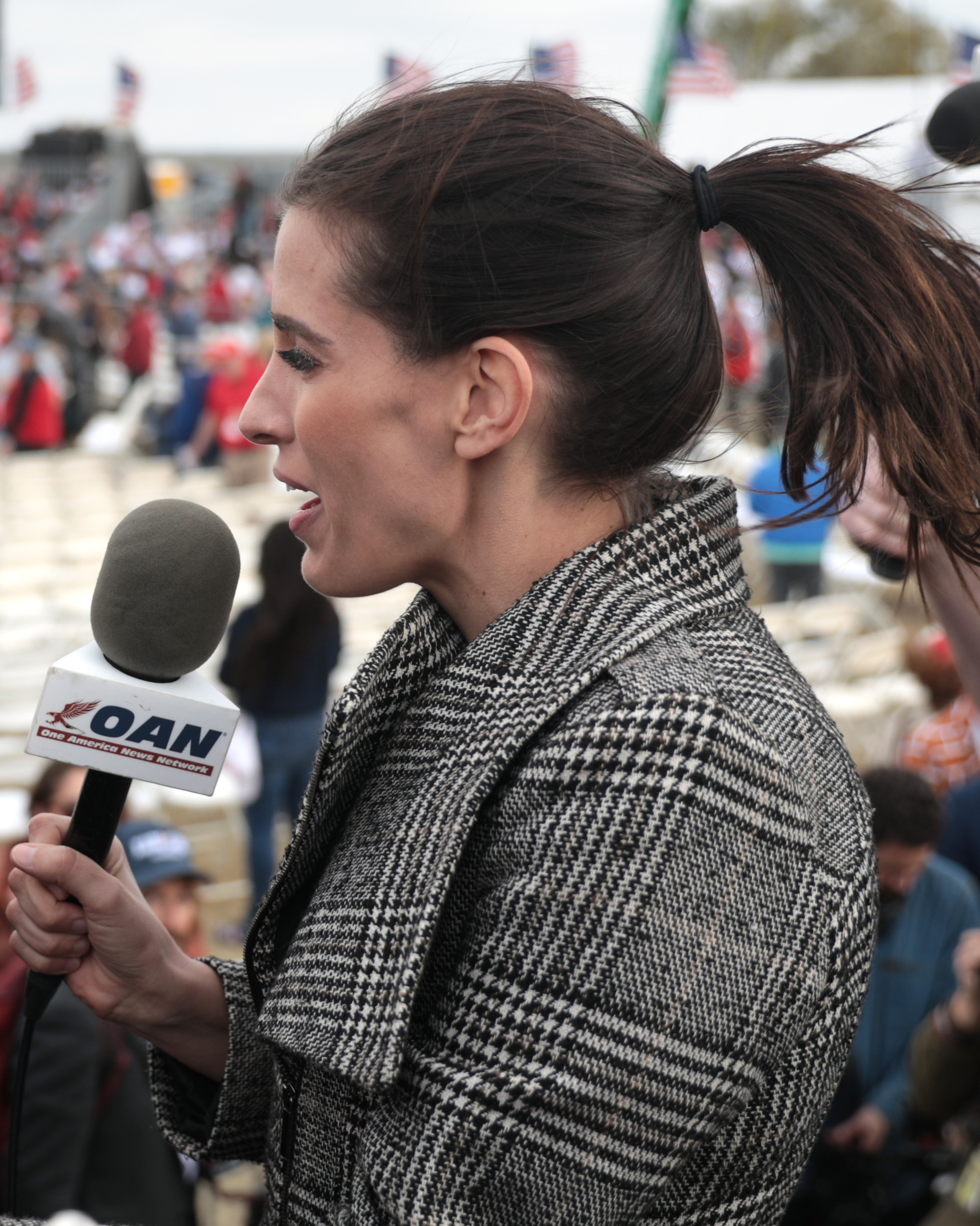
- Bobb in 2022
- Born: Christina Gabrielle Bobb; November 4, 1982 (age 44); Michigan, U.S.
- Education: Arizona State University, Tempe (BA); San Diego State University (MBA); California Western School of Law (JD); Georgetown University Law Center (LLM)
- Political party: Republican
- Military career
- Branch: United States Marine Corps
- Service years: 2009–2012

Christina Gabrielle Bobb (born November 4, 1982) is an American lawyer and former television presenter. She served as a judge advocate in the United States Marine Corps, worked as executive secretary at the United States Department of Homeland Security (DHS) during the first presidency of Donald Trump, and became a correspondent and host for One America News Network (OANN) in 2020. After the 2020 United States presidential election, she assisted Donald Trump and his attorneys in their challenges to his election defeat and promoted claims that Trump's loss was due to widespread fraud, which was ultimately determined not to have happened.

Bobb later served as an attorney for Trump and in 2024 became senior counsel for election integrity at the Republican National Committee (RNC). She joined the litigation staff of Judicial Watch in 2025 and is a senior attorney there.

Bobb was also involved in the federal investigation of Trump's handling of classified government documents after leaving office. In April 2024, she and seventeen other Arizona Republicans and Trump associates were indicted on state charges arising from the Trump fake electors plot. She pleaded not guilty. The original indictment was dismissed without prejudice in August 2026, permitting prosecutors to seek new charges. As of October 2026, Bobb is pursuing appeals concerning the dismissal and other rulings in the case.

== Early life and education ==
Bobb was born in Michigan as the younger of two girls, and grew up in Arizona, where she attended Mountain Pointe High School in Phoenix, Arizona, graduating early to attend the University of Arizona. She was a reserve goalkeeper for the Arizona Wildcats women's soccer team in 2000 and 2001 before transferring to Texas Christian University, where she played goalkeeper for the Horned Frogs in 2002.

Bobb later earned a bachelor's degree from Arizona State University and an MBA from San Diego State University. She received her J.D. from California Western School of Law and was admitted to the State Bar of California in 2008. She subsequently earned an LL.M. in national security law from Georgetown University Law Center.

== Career ==
=== Legal and military career ===
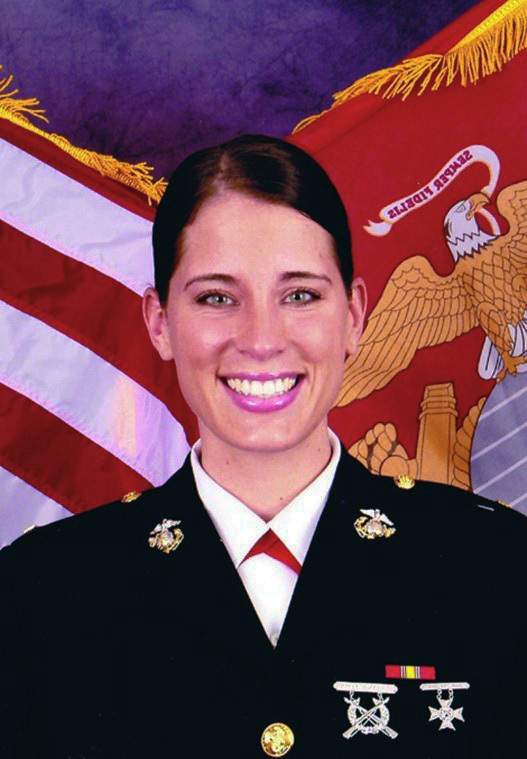
Bobb's official Marine Corps portrait photograph

Before entering the Marine Corps, Bobb worked as a trial attorney for the city of San Diego in juvenile dependency proceedings, including cases involving child abuse and termination of parental rights. Bobb completed Officer Candidates School in August 2009 and was commissioned in the U.S. Marine Corps as a second lieutenant. She completed The Basic School in May 2010 and attended the Naval Justice School. As a judge advocate, Bobb served as a defense counsel at Marine Corps Base Quantico, representing Marines and sailors in courts-martial and administrative separation proceedings. She also served as an operational-law attorney in Helmand Province, Afghanistan, advising military commanders on legal issues involving operations and intelligence, and was also mobilized to United States Marine Forces Europe and Africa in Stuttgart, Germany, where she worked as an operations officer.

After leaving active military service in 2012, Bobb joined the San Diego law firm Higgs Fletcher & Mack, where she practiced business and civil litigation. She later worked at the Office of Legal Counsel of the Office of National Drug Control Policy before joining DHS in May 2018. In 2014, Bobb ran as an independent for the United States House of Representatives in California's 53rd congressional district. She finished eighth in the eight-candidate blanket primary, receiving 929 of 88,953 votes.

At DHS, Bobb served as executive secretary in the Office of the Executive Secretariat. Her responsibilities included managing formal written communications for the secretary and deputy secretary of homeland security. Former DHS official Miles Taylor later told USA Today that Bobb repeatedly sought to weigh in on substantive policy matters outside the administrative scope of her position, including counterterrorism. Other former colleagues described concerns about the extent to which she brought strongly partisan political views into her government work.

=== One America News Network ===
In June 2020, Bobb was hired by One America News Network (OANN), a far-right, pro-Trump cable channel. She initially covered the White House and later hosted the weekend political program Weekly Briefing with Christina Bobb, a weekend political talk show. The New York Times described Bobb as having "emerged as one of [Trump's] truest of true believers", including embracing Trump-supported conspiracy theories, and relayed assertions that Trump himself believed Bobb was too flattering of him during some interviews. After the 2020 presidential election, Bobb used her OANN position to promote Trump's unsubstantiated claims of widespread election fraud, while also volunteering to assist Trump's legal team in challenging the election results. The Washington Post reported that Bobb's journalistic and political roles increasingly overlapped during this period.

Bobb became a prominent promoter of the Republican-led 2021 Maricopa County presidential ballot audit. OANN having received exclusive rights to livestream the proceedings, Bobb hosted a February 2021 special, "The Arizona Election Heist", that included numerous unsupported claims about the election. Bobb and OANN colleague Chanel Rion were also involved with Voices and Votes, a nonprofit organization that raised money for the audit. Bobb served as the group's president and chief executive, and the organization ultimately reported raising $605,000, and supplied volunteers to the audit effort. The audit found no evidence of fraud that would have changed the result and its hand count increased Biden's margin over Trump in Maricopa County.

In August 2021, Dominion Voting Systems sued OANN, Bobb and Rion, among others, for defamation, alleging that they had falsely accused Dominion of rigging the 2020 election. The federal district court later denied defendants' motion to dismiss the defamation claims, but on February 28, 2025, Dominion and Bobb jointly stipulated to dismissal of all of Dominion's claims against Bobb, with each party bearing its own costs.

=== Involvement in the 2020 presidential election ===
==== Pre- and initial post-election activities ====
In March 2022, Bobb announced that she was leaving OANN to work for Trump's Save America political action committee. She also appeared as a correspondent covering Trump rallies for the pro-Trump Right Side Broadcasting Network. After the November 2020 election, Bobb volunteered to assist Trump's attorneys, including Rudy Giuliani, in efforts to challenge the election results. On December 12, she participated in a Trump campaign call concerning plans for Republican electors to meet in seven states won by Joe Biden. In notes from the call that she emailed to a campaign operative, Bobb reported on the status of elector recruitment and preparations in each state, including that all eleven Arizona Republican electors were prepared to meet.

The following day, Bobb emailed several Trump attorneys and allies with additional information about the proposed elector slates. She described campaign official Mike Roman as communicating with teams in the seven states and relayed developments to recipients including Giuliani, Jenna Ellis, Boris Epshteyn, Joseph diGenova and Victoria Toensing.

==== Efforts to overturn the election ====
Bobb was present at the Willard Hotel "command center" where Giuliani and other Trump associates worked on efforts to prevent Biden's victory from being certified on January 6, 2021.

In March 2023, prosecutors conducting the investigation that became the Georgia election racketeering prosecution sought to interview Bobb. Her attorney indicated at the time that she would decline to be interviewed. On April 24, 2024, an Arizona grand jury indicted Bobb and seventeen others on charges arising from efforts to overturn Biden's victory in Arizona. Bobb was charged with conspiracy, fraudulent schemes and artifices, fraudulent schemes and practices, and six counts of forgery. On May 21, Bobb pleaded not guilty in Maricopa County Superior Court.

In May 2025, Maricopa County Superior Court Judge Sam Myers ordered the prosecution returned to the grand jury after finding that prosecutors had deprived the defendants of a substantial procedural right by failing to adequately explain the federal Electoral Count Act, which the defendants argued bore on whether their conduct was lawful. After the Arizona Court of Appeals declined to review that ruling, Attorney General Kris Mayes sought review by the Arizona Supreme Court. The state supreme court declined the appeal in June 2026. Prosecutors, unable to complete a new grand-jury presentation within the applicable deadline, asked that the existing indictment be dismissed and in August 2026, Myers dismissed the remaining charges without prejudice. As of October 2026, Bobb and other former defendants were seeking appellate review of their claims under Arizona's anti-SLAPP statute in an effort to prevent renewed prosecution. Bobb is also appealing the order dismissing the case without prejudice and the denial of her motion to disqualify Mayes from the prosecution.

On November 7, 2025, Trump issued a federal pardon to Bobb and dozens of others for potential federal offenses connected with efforts involving alternate presidential electors and challenges to the 2020 election. Because presidential pardons apply only to federal offenses, the pardon did not affect the Arizona state proceedings.

=== Trump's handling of classified documents ===
On May 11, 2022, the United States Department of Justice (DOJ) subpoenaed Trump for "any and all documents or writings in the custody or control of Donald J. Trump and/or the Office of Donald J. Trump bearing classification markings".

Investigators from the DOJ and the FBI met with Trump's attorneys at Mar-a-Lago on June 3 about the classified material that was subpoenaed on May 11. During this meeting, Bobb, who was Trump's custodian of records, gave the DOJ a signed declaration that had been drafted by Evan Corcoran, attesting that all classified material had been returned. As it turned out, the declaration had been drafted by Corcoran and handed to Bobb, who insisted on adding caveats because she had not done the search herself. Two months later, after the falsehood came to light, The New York Times reported that the signed declaration possibly indicated that Trump's legal team had not been forthright with federal investigators about the material. As of September 16, 2022, investigators had not decided whether to pursue a criminal inquiry against Bobb and Corcoran.

In October 2022, multiple news agencies reported that Bobb was speaking with federal investigators in connection to the Mar-a-Lago probe. According to Bobb, Corcoran told her that he had conducted a thorough search of Mar-a-Lago before asking her to certify that all of the requested records had been returned.

In February 2023, Bobb testified before the federal grand jury investigating the documents. She was not charged in the classified-documents case. The federal prosecution of Trump over the documents was dismissed in 2024, and prosecutors abandoned their appeal as to Trump after his election to a second term.

=== Republican National Committee and Judicial Watch ===
After Trump-backed candidates Michael Whatley and Lara Trump took control of the Republican National Committee in March 2024, Bobb was named senior counsel for election integrity on March 12. She joined a newly created RNC department of attorneys and political operatives focused on election law and administration. Its activities included election-related litigation and recruiting and training poll workers, poll watchers and attorneys for the 2024 election. The Washington Post reported after Bobb's April 2024 indictment that she was not likely to leave her RNC position, but rather her indictment "solidifies her identity as a dedicated Trump loyalist who fiercely fought to reverse his loss in the politically competitive state and potentially elevates her role within the RNC to help him win in November".

In a podcast weeks before the 2024 election, Bobb characterized the political left as "evil" and "demonic", and seeking to "normalize pedophilia". She continued, "I think there's a lot of weird, weird things going on behind the scenes that we probably can't see", adding, "I hope they all break the surface so that we just get this cleansing in our nation and we can clean out the filth". Bobb worked in the RNC's election-integrity operation during the 2024 election cycle. In March 2025, Judicial Watch announced that she had joined its litigation team. As of October 2026, Judicial Watch lists Bobb as a senior attorney whose work focuses on national security law.

== Bibliography ==
- Stealing Your Vote: The Inside Story of the 2020 Election and What It Means for 2024. Skyhorse Publishing. 2023. ISBN 9781510776692.
- Defiant: Inside the Mar-a-Lago Raid and the Left's Ongoing Lawfare. Skyhorse Publishing. 2025. ISBN 9781510784918.
