= AWE (TV network) =

American TV network

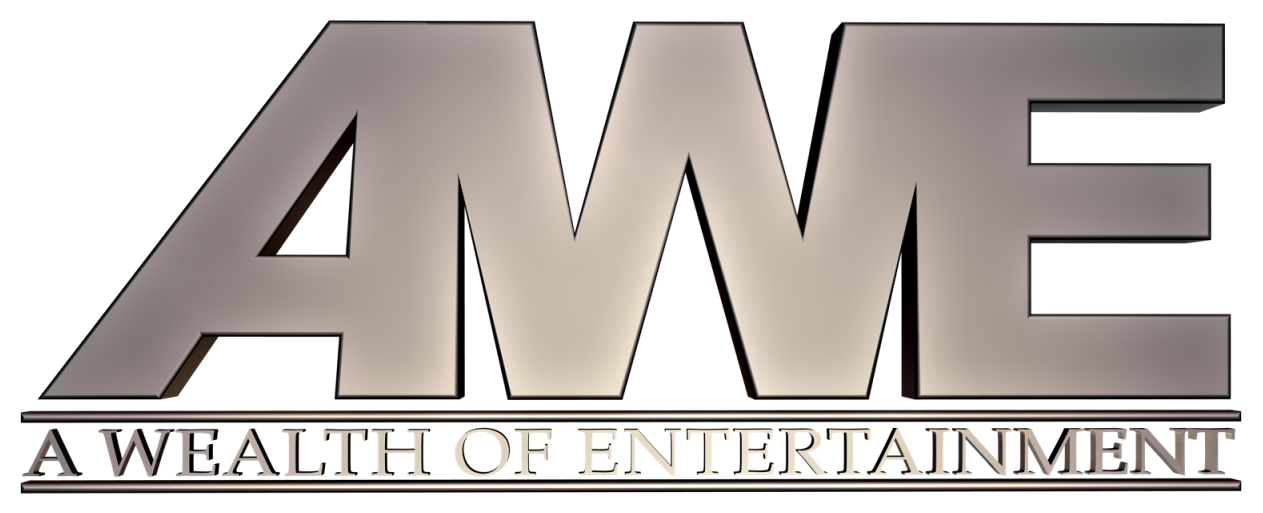

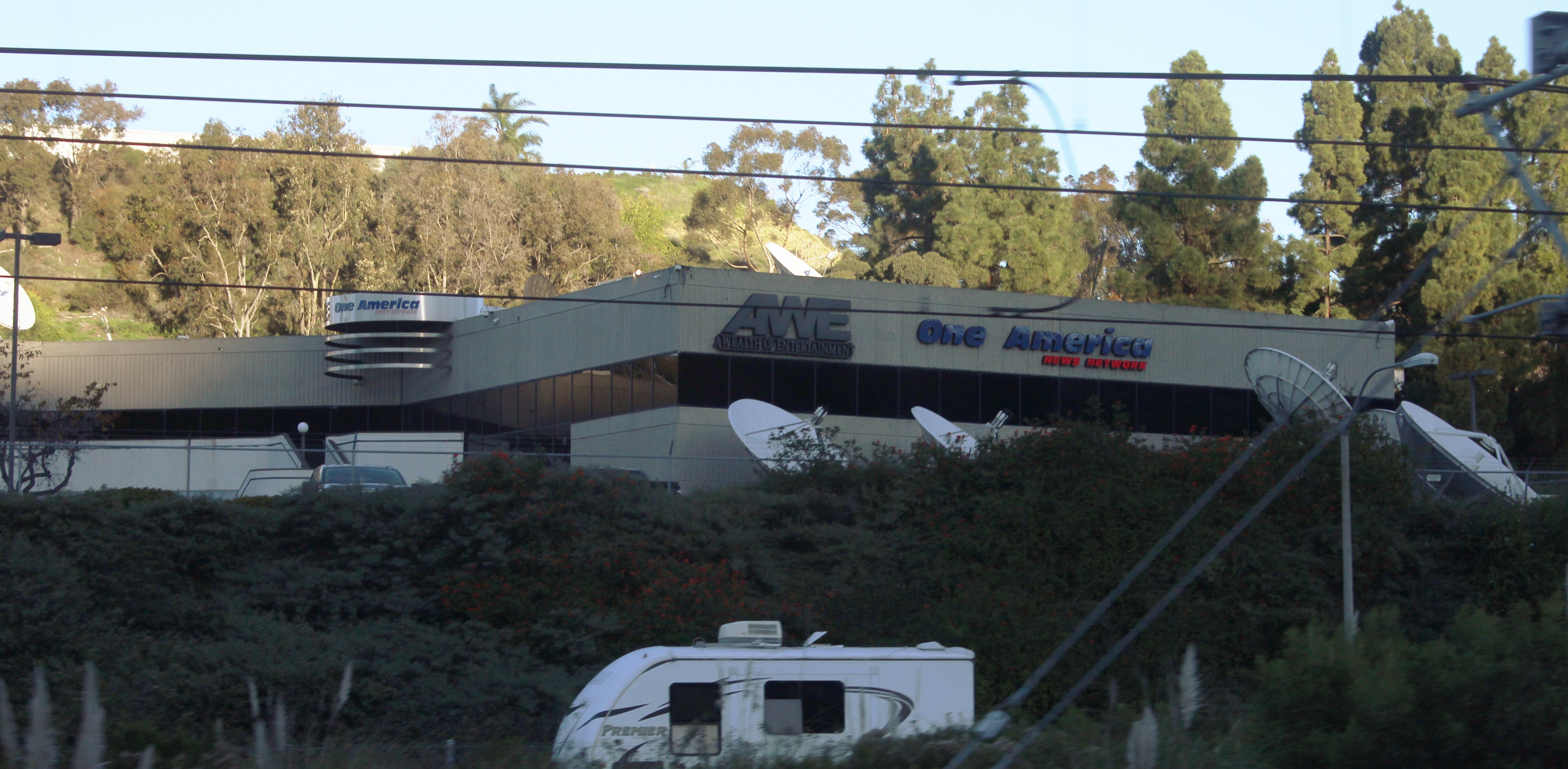
- Broadcast area: National; Worldwide
- Headquarters: San Diego, California

Programming
- Picture format: 1080i (HDTV) (HD feed downgraded to letterboxed 480i for SDTVs)

Ownership
- Owner: Herring Networks, Inc.
- Sister channels: One America News Network

History
- Launched: June 1, 2004; 21 years ago
- Former names: Wealth TV (2004–13)

Links
- Website: www.awetv.com

Availability

Streaming media
- Digital media receiver: Amazon Fire TV; Roku; Apple TV

AWE (A Wealth of Entertainment; formerly Wealth TV) is an American lifestyle and entertainment cable network. Privately held by Herring Networks, Inc., the network operates several domestic and international television feeds while its primary production facilities and corporate headquarters are located in San Diego, California.

== History ==
Former logo under the name Wealth TV; 2004–2013

AWE debuted in 2004 under the name Wealth TV. It was founded by Robert Herring Sr. and his sons.

Herring hired Dean Harris as general manager and gave him a 5% stake in the channel. Harris was a former stock broker and convicted felon who was barred from trading by the Securities and Exchange Commission and served a 32-month federal prison sentence. Herring said that he did not know of Harris' prison term until he was informed by a reporter for Reuters.

In 2007 and 2008, Wealth TV filed carriage access complaints with the Federal Communications Commission (FCC) against the owners of iN DEMAND, namely Comcast, Time Warner Cable, Bright House Networks, and Cox Communications. Herring alleged that the companies refused to air Wealth TV because it competed against a lifestyle network co-owned by them. In March 2013, an appeals court ruled in favor of the cable operators.

On January 14, 2022, DirecTV announced that its contract with Herring Networks, including carriage of AWE and its controversial sister channel One America News Network (OANN), would not be renewed, and the networks would be removed in early April from its satellite and U-verse TV services. The channels were removed on April 4, 2022. On July 30, 2022, Verizon FiOS removed the channel from its lineup. On May 14, 2025, Charter Spectrum agreed to add AWE and OAN to its cable channel lineup.

== Programs ==
AWE operates a 24/7 channel domestically as well as an international feed with alternate programming for which it owns the worldwide rights. The network also offers its 24/7 feeds and programs on demand through multiple digital media-playing devices. AWE also provides free over the air (OTA) viewing in many domestic US markets as AWEplus.

=== Live championship boxing ===
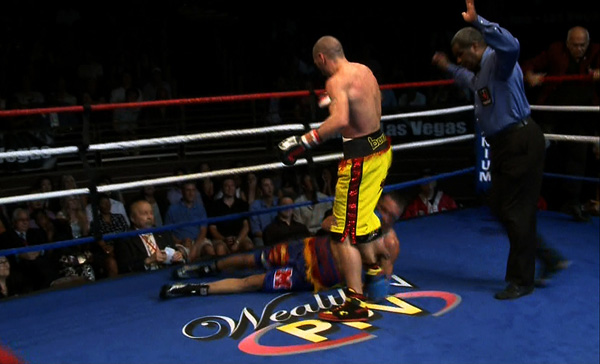
Anthony Mundine stands over Bronco McKart on Fight Night, July 14, 2012

In 2011, WealthTV began airing live professional boxing branded "Wealth TV's Fight Night". In July 2012, the network aired its first live pay-per-view (PPV) event, branded "Wealth TV PPV". The Boxing Writers Association of America (BWAA) recognized six fights for 2012 as nominees for Best Fight of the Year, two of which were aired live on Wealth TV. David Price, a heavyweight boxer featured exclusively in the US on Wealth TV in 2012, was recognized by Dan Rafael of ESPN as the top Prospect of the Year.

AWE has aired many bouts, including the matchup of Ricky Burns against Ray Beltran for the world lightweight title (2013), and the crowning of American, Terence Crawford, after his defeat of Ricky Burns (2014).
