= Robert Herring (businessman) =

American businessman

- Born: Alson Shelby Herring; 1941 (age 84–85); Louisiana, U.S.
- Known for: Founder of Herring Networks
- Children: 4

Robert Shelby Herring Sr. (born 1941) is an American businessman who founded Herring Networks, a media company that launched and currently owns AWE and One America News Network.

== Early life and education ==
Herring was born Alson Shelby Herring in a house in northeastern Louisiana in 1941. The family moved to a farm near Bakersfield, California, in 1948, and later moved near Los Angeles. Herring's father died when he was a teenager; he dropped out of high school and worked to support his family; he would eventually earn his GED.

Perceiving his given first name, Alson, to sound too feminine, by the 1970s Herring called himself Robert or Bob; he legally changed his name to Robert in 2005.

== Career ==
Herring initially worked as a chauffeur and owned several pet shops. In 1972, he acquired a local circuit board factory and renamed it Industrial Circuits. In 1981, he hired Michael Reagan, son of then-President Ronald Reagan, as a salesman at Industrial Circuits. Herring sold Industrial Circuits to Toppan Printing in 1988 for $52 million.

In 1989, Herring created another circuit board company, Herco Technology, with his sons Charles and Robert Jr. as co-owners. In 1994, a Herco employee reported to his supervisors that the facility in San Diego County was illegally flushing copper, prompting an investigation by the Federal Bureau of Investigation (FBI). In 1995, Herring fired the employee, who sued Herco for retaliation and was awarded $78,400 in damages. In November 1997, Herco pleaded guilty to one count of pollution and agreed to pay a criminal fine of $170,000, following a report by a resident in June. For the next three years, the company received pollution violation notices for releasing copper, silver and cyanide into the environment.

In 2000, the Herrings sold the company to Teradyne for $122 million. After Teradyne's stock fell by about half in the next year, the Herrings sued the company, alleging that Teradyne executives had misled them during the negotiations. Teradyne denied any wrongdoing, saying that it had properly disclosed its finances before the deal and that market conditions had shifted. The Herrings lost the lawsuit.

In 2003, Herring founded Herring Networks, a media network based in San Diego. In 2004, Herring launched the cable channel Wealth TV (now AWE). In 2013, the network launched One America News Network, a far-right cable channel known for its pro-Donald Trump coverage.

== Political activities ==
Though Herring has been a conservative since the 1970s, though he has occasionally donated to Democrats, including a $4,600 contribution to Hillary Clinton's campaign in 2007. He has stated under oath he once voted for Barack Obama for President. The majority of his family's $500,000 in contributions has gone to Republicans.

In 2004, Herring donated $15,000 to help rescue a university talk by left-wing filmmaker Michael Moore after the university cut funding, citing free speech principles as the cause of the donation.

In 2005, Herring offered $1 million to Michael Schiavo, the husband in the Terri Schiavo case, to cede custody of wife Terri to her parents, an offer Michael Schiavo refused.

== Personal life ==
Herring married his first wife when he was 18; they had four children by the time Herring was 24. They divorced in 1977. Herring divorced his second wife in 1997. He married his third wife, a Russian national, in 2000. He lives in San Diego.

In September 2024, Herring's legal counsel claimed he has Alzheimer's disease, while seeking to block his deposition in Dominion Voting Systems' multibillion-dollar defamation lawsuit against him and his network.
