= Herring Networks =

Cable broadcasting network

'

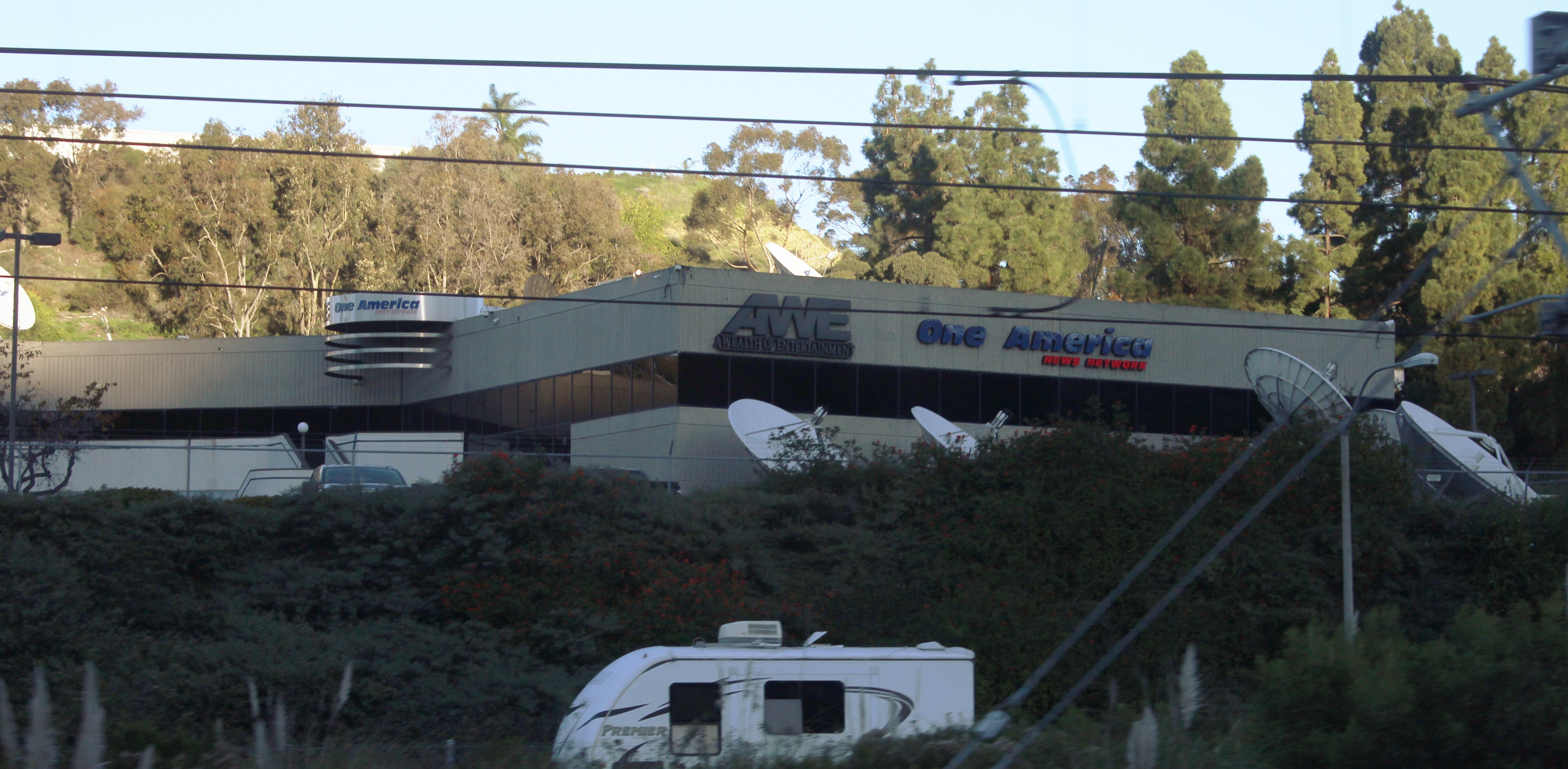
Headquarters of Herring Networks, showing the logos of the two stations owned by it.

Herring Networks Inc.' is a media company based in San Diego, California. It was founded in 2003 by Robert Herring. Through its Herring Broadcasting division, the company owns and operates two cable networks: AWE Network (originally known as Wealth TV), an American lifestyle and entertainment cable network founded in 2004, and the news service One America News Network (OAN or OANN), founded through a strategic partnership with The Washington Times in 2013.
