= Wandrea' ArShaye Moss =

American election official

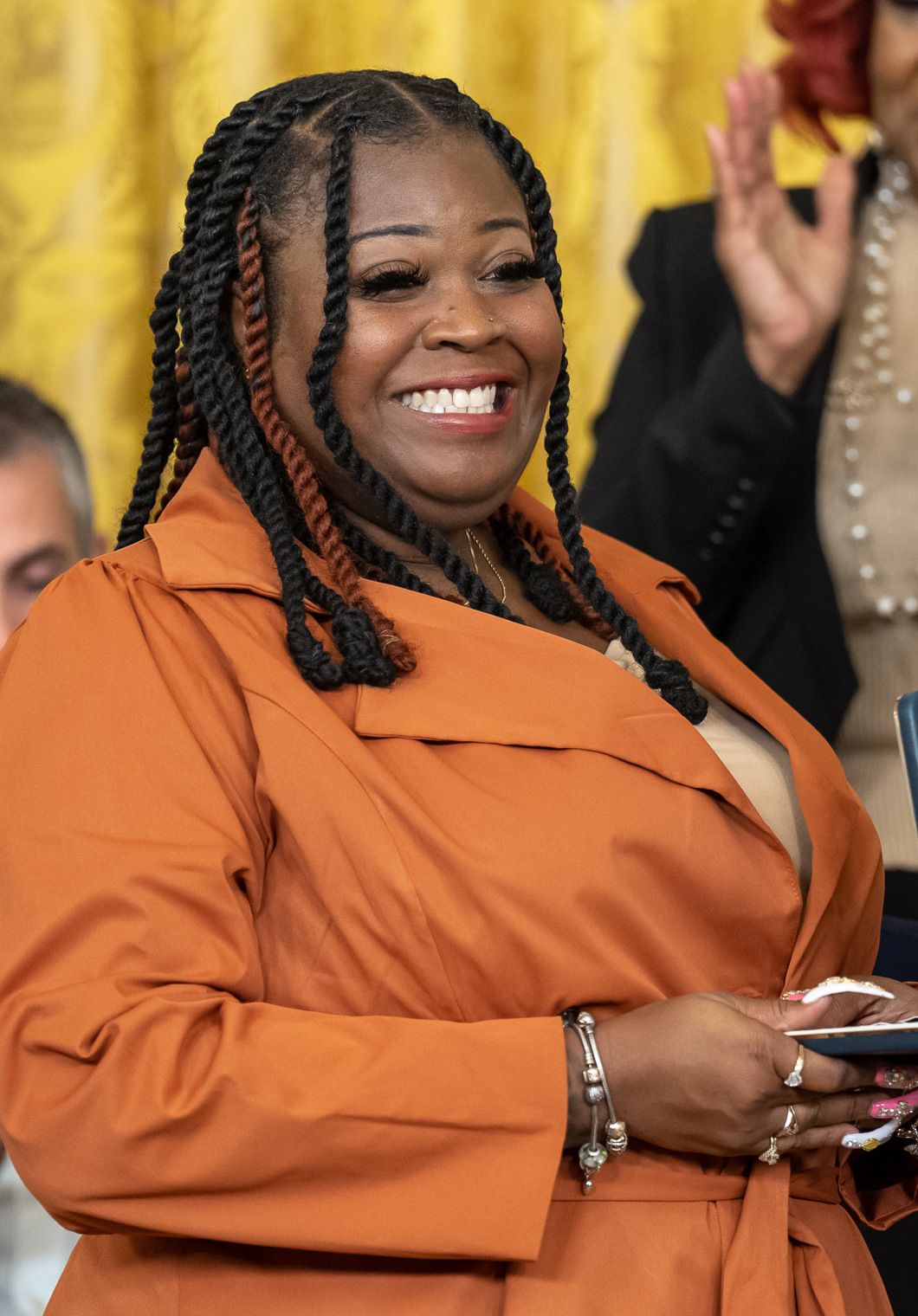
- Moss in 2023
- Born: Georgia, U.S.
- Occupation: Election official
- Years active: 2011–2022
- Mother: Ruby Freeman
- Awards: Profile in Courage Award (2022); Presidential Citizens Medal (2023)

Wandrea' ArShaye Moss is an American election official from Georgia who was employed by Fulton County Department of Registration and Elections from 2011 to 2022, handling voter registration, absentee ballots, and election tabulation. Following the 2020 U.S. presidential election in Georgia, she became a target of false voter fraud allegations, which led to widespread harassment and public testimony before the U.S. House Select Committee on the January 6 Attack. Moss received a Profile in Courage Award and a Presidential Citizens Medal.

== Early life ==
Moss was born and raised in Georgia. Her mother, Ruby Freeman, and her grandmother both worked in county government, with Freeman employed by Fulton County, Georgia, and her grandmother retiring from DeKalb County, Georgia.

== Career ==
Moss began working as a temporary election worker for Fulton County Department of Registration and Elections in September 2011. Initially hired for the November 2011 election, she continued to be called back for subsequent elections before transitioning into a long-term role. She became a full-time employee in 2017. Her responsibilities included processing voter registration and absentee ballot applications, coordinating election mailings, and assisting in ballot tabulation. She frequently worked directly with voters, providing support for completing registration and ballot requests. Moss held the position of registration supervisor beginning in August 2020. In this role, she oversaw the tabulation process for absentee ballots during the November 2020 General Election.

During the 2020 election, Moss's mother, Freeman, was hired as a temporary election worker under Moss's supervision. On election night, November 3, 2020, Moss and her team worked at State Farm Arena, where the tabulation center was located. According to official investigations, Moss adhered to established procedures, including storing ballot boxes under tables to ensure continuity for the next day's work. Later that evening, following instructions from a supervisor, Moss and remaining staff resumed the scanning process to complete pending work.

Moss worked for Fulton County until April 2022. She received a 2022 Profile in Courage Award. In January 2023, Moss was awarded the Presidential Citizens Medal by U.S. president Joe Biden.

=== False voter fraud allegations ===
After the election, Moss and Freeman were accused of election fraud by public Donald Trump-aligned figures, including Rudy Giuliani, who falsely claimed that they handled fraudulent ballots at the tabulation center. The allegations were widely discredited following thorough investigations by multiple law enforcement agencies, including the Federal Bureau of Investigation and Georgia Bureau of Investigation. These investigations found no evidence of wrongdoing by Moss or Freeman, confirming that all procedures were conducted properly.

These accusations led to threats and harassment directed at Moss, her family, and colleagues. Moss testified before the United States House Select Committee on the January 6 Attack. She described the threats and harassment she faced due to the false accusations, which included racist messages and disruptions to her personal life.

Moss and her mother filed defamation tort lawsuits against individuals and media outlets that spread the false claims. They received settlements from One America News Network in 2022 and The Gateway Pundit in 2024. In November 2024, Moss and Freeman began receiving assets from Giuliani, including a watch collection, jewelry, and a vintage car, as partial payment of a $148 million defamation judgment against him for spreading false claims that they committed election fraud during the 2020 presidential election. The judgment followed years of legal battles and delays, during which Giuliani’s actions caused personal and professional harm to Moss and Freeman.
