= Emerald Robinson =

American broadcaster and conspiracy theorist

- Employers: One America News Network (2017–2020); Newsmax (2020–2022); LindellTV (2022–present)
- Children: 1

Emerald Robinson is an American broadcaster and conspiracy theorist. She previously worked as the chief White House correspondent for One America News Network from 2017 to 2020 and Newsmax from 2020 to 2022. She was let go by Newsmax after promoting misinformation about COVID-19 vaccines. She hosts The Absolute Truth, a show on Mike Lindell's Frank platform.

== Career ==
Prior to working as a broadcaster, Robinson worked as an actress and model.

In May 2018, One America News Network appointed Robinson as its chief White House correspondent. In 2019, Robinson posted an Islamophobic tweet calling Ilhan Omar an "al-Qaeda supporting Somali Gangster" and an "Islamist terrorist supporter". Robinson subsequently received an endorsement from the far-right website VDARE.

In February 2020, Robinson joined Newsmax as its White House correspondent. In April, during the COVID-19 pandemic, she promoted a conspiracy theory that Bill Gates was planning to use vaccines to track people. After then-president Donald Trump lost the 2020 presidential election, Robinson promoted conspiracy theories about Dominion Voting Systems.

In November 2021, Robinson falsely tweeted that the Moderna COVID-19 vaccine contained luciferase "so that you can be tracked." This echoed earlier false social media claims that the vaccine supposedly had satanic links due to "lucifer" in luciferase and alleged references to "666." Robinson's tweet began with the salutation "Dear Christians" and referred her over 400,000 followers to the Book of Revelation; in a tweet days earlier, she equated vaccines with the Mark of the Beast. Twitter removed the tweet that day and suspended Robinson's account for seven days, citing "repeated violations of our COVID-19 misinformation policy," as Newsmax sought to distance itself from her remark and removed her from the air pending an inquiry. Robinson returned to Twitter after her suspension to continue spreading COVID-19 misinformation, causing Twitter to permanently ban her within hours. Newsmax announced the next month that it would not renew Robinson's contract when it ended in January 2022.

In January 2022, Robinson joined LindellTV, an online outlet founded by Mike Lindell. In May, she falsely claimed that Brian Kemp receiving 74% of the vote in the Republican primary of the Georgia gubernatorial election was proof of "obvious fraud", saying that "Nobody in any election in America gets 74% of the votes."

Following Damar Hamlin's collapse in January 2023, Robinson baselessly suggested that the COVID-19 vaccine was responsible. In July 2023, Robinson falsely tweeted that COVID-19 vaccines were responsible for a "massive increase in breast cancer" in women under 50.

== Views ==
In a column for The American Spectator, Robinson wrote that black NFL players protesting against police brutality were "Rococo Marxists and millionaire Black Panther athletes." She also criticised the "low-testosterone, dilettantish strain" of "intellectual" conservatives and said that Never Trump conservatives were "Jewish and agnostic", while "the Republican Party is overwhelmingly Caucasian and Christian."

In November 2021, Robinson tweeted, "I don't want a multi-cultural society, I want a Christian society." Her statement led to accusations of white supremacy.

== Personal life ==
Robinson has a son.
