= Thomas Ryum Amlie =

American politician (1897–1973)

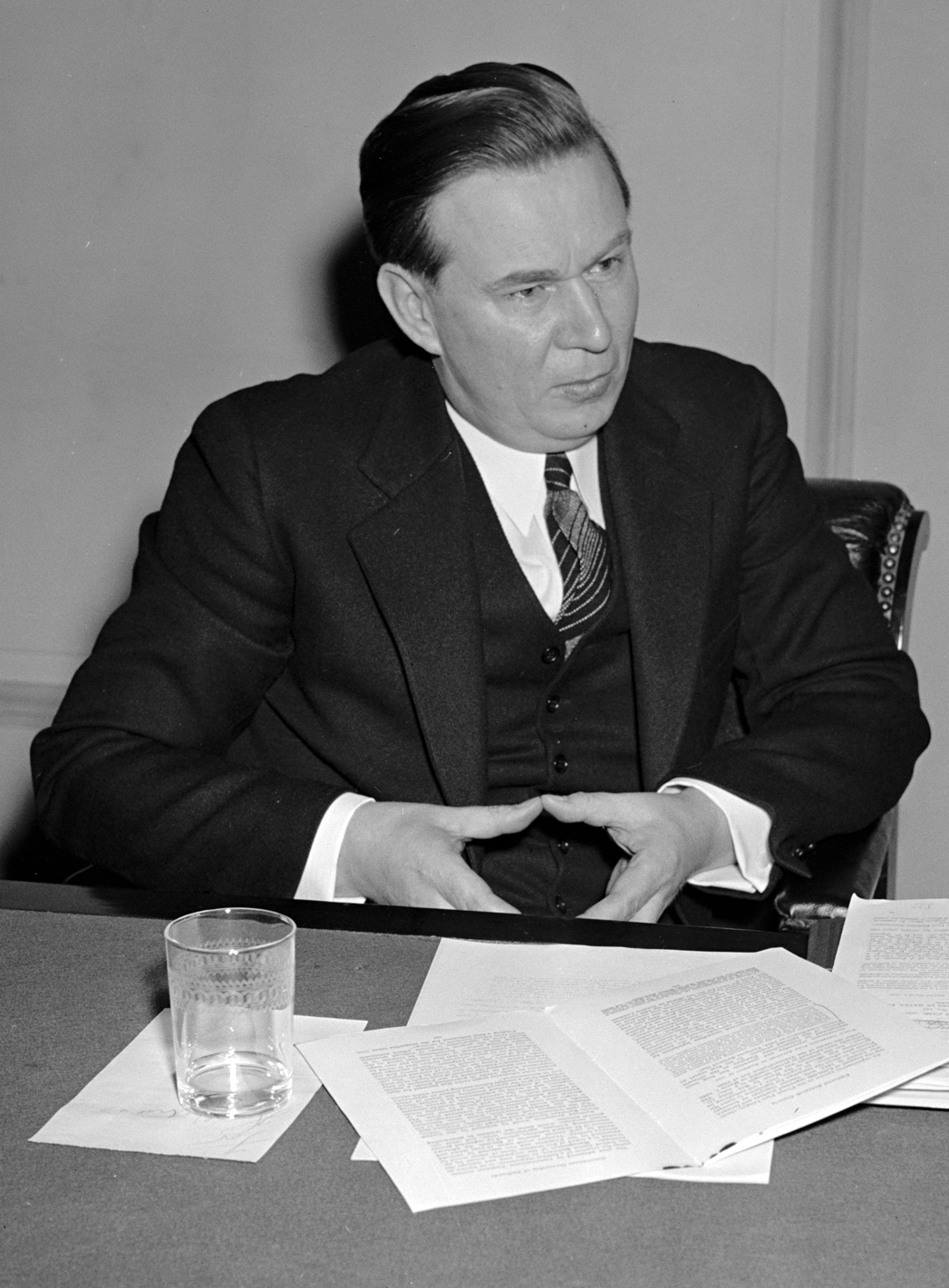

Member of the U.S. House of Representatives from Wisconsin's 1st district
- In office January 3, 1935 – January 3, 1939
- Preceded by: George W. Blanchard
- Succeeded by: Stephen Bolles
- In office October 13, 1931 – March 3, 1933
- Preceded by: Henry A. Cooper
- Succeeded by: George W. Blanchard

Personal details
- Born: April 17, 1897 Binford, North Dakota, US
- Died: August 22, 1973 (aged 76) Madison, Wisconsin, US
- Resting place: Forest Hill Cemetery
- Party: Republican (before 1934); Progressive (1934–1941); Democratic (after 1941)
- Spouse(s): Marian Caldwell Strong (m. 1925; died 1930) Gehrta Farkasch Beyer (m. 1932)
- Children: 5
- Relatives: Hans Amlie (brother); Milly Bennett (sister-in-law)
- Education: University of North Dakota attended University of Minnesota attended University of Wisconsin Law School (J.D.)
- Profession: Lawyer

Military service
- Allegiance: United States
- Branch/service: United States Army

Thomas Ryum Amlie (April 17, 1897 – August 22, 1973) was an American lawyer and progressive politician from Wisconsin. He served six years in the U.S. House of Representatives, representing Wisconsin's 1st congressional district; he was first elected to 72nd Congress (1931–1933) as a progressive Republican, but was defeated in the 1932 Republican primary; he then returned to Congress running on the Wisconsin Progressive Party ticket, and served from 1935 to 1939. He helped established the Farmer-Labor-Progressive League and later the Farmer-Labor Progressive Federation. Inspired by the progressive policies of the Roosevelt administration, Amlie joined the Democratic Party in the 1940s and made two more unsuccessful bids for Congress.

He was an elder brother of Hans Amlie, the socialist activist who served as a leader of American volunteers fighting for the Republican side in the Spanish Civil War.

== Early life and career ==
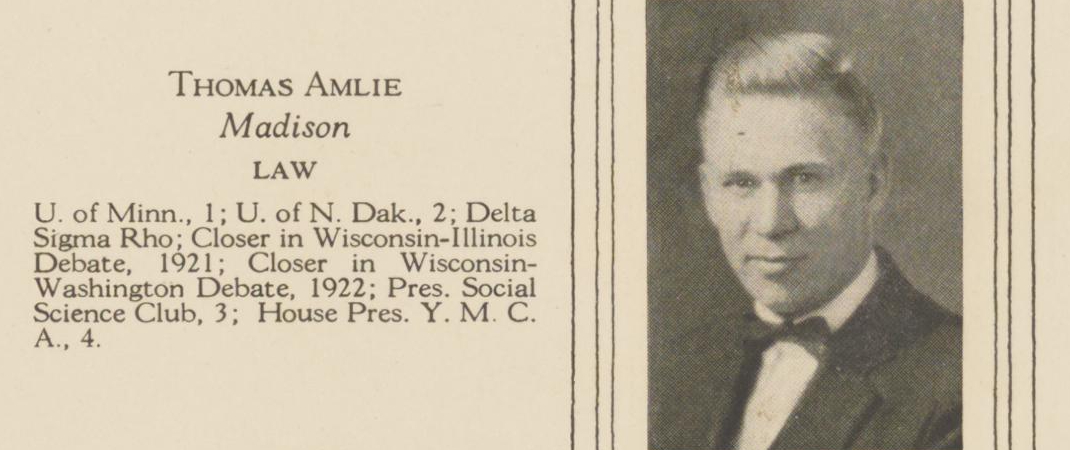
Amlie in the University of Wisconsin–Madison yearbook, 1924

Amlie was born on a farm near Binford, North Dakota. During his youth, Amlie went to the high school in Cooperstown, North Dakota, and was on the debate team with his brother, future Lincoln Battalion commander Hans Amlie. Following his graduation he then went on to attend and then to the University of North Dakota from 1916-1918, after which he spent a short period of time in the United States Army. Following his return, he then attended the University of Minnesota for a year, but became disinterested in pursuing a career in teaching sociology and economics and began organizing for the Nonpartisan League.

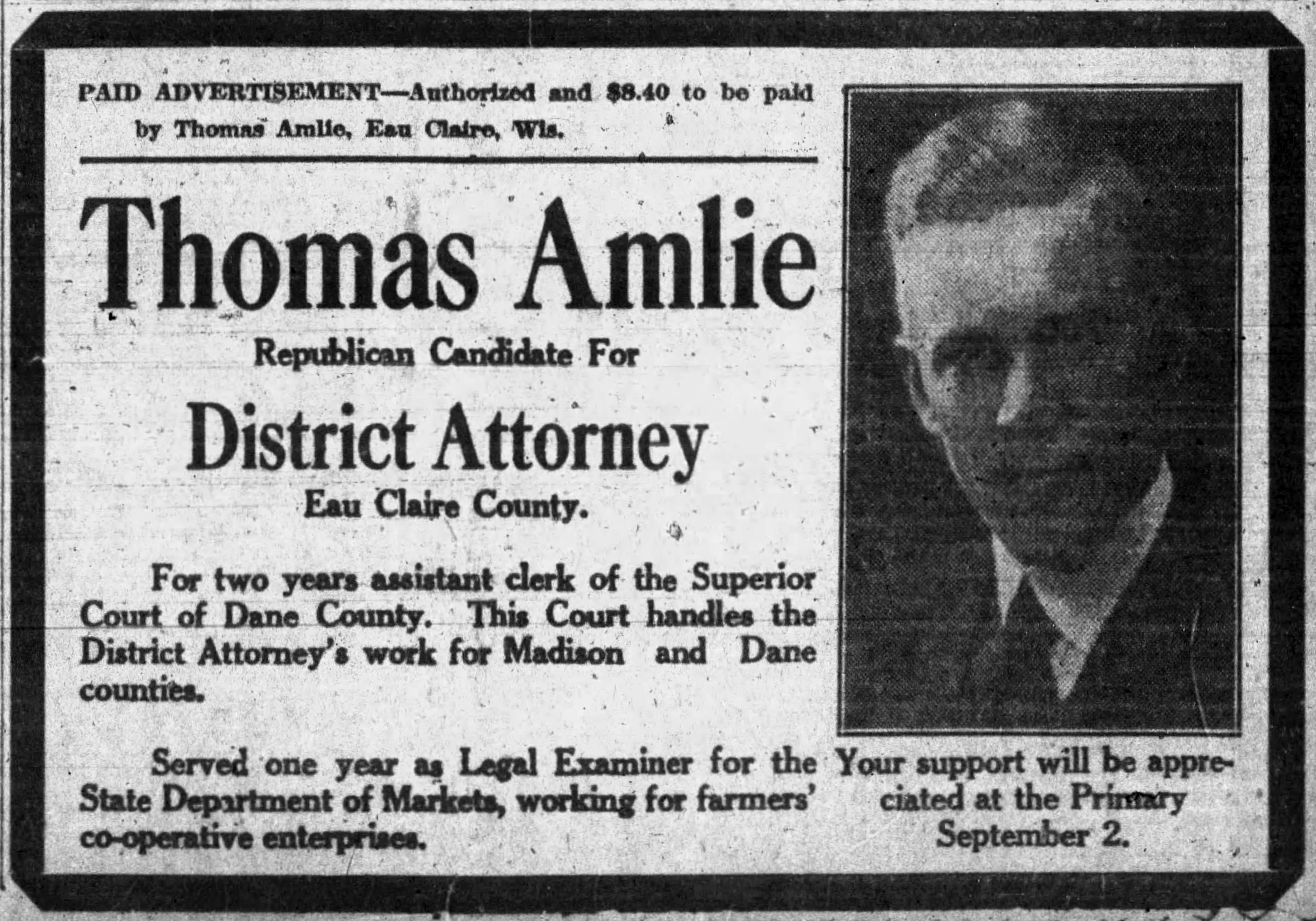
Newspaper advertisement promoting Amlie's candidacy for Eau Claire County District Attorney, August 30, 1924

After a short period of organizing for the League in Wisconsin, Amlie then enrolled in the University of Wisconsin Law School, where he received his Juris Doctor degree in 1923, being admitted to the bar that same year. After receiving his degree, Amlie served two years as assistant clerk to the Dane County Superior Court and one year as legal examiner for the State Department of Markets. During the 1924 presidential election, he was district chairman for Robert M. La Follette's campaign and ran unsuccessfully for Eau Claire County District Attorney. Later that year, he began practicing law in Beloit, Wisconsin, where he helped established the firm Fiedler, Garrigan, and Amlie. Three years later, he moved to Elkhorn, Wisconsin, which became his permanent residence.

== Political career ==
=== Congress (1931–1933) ===
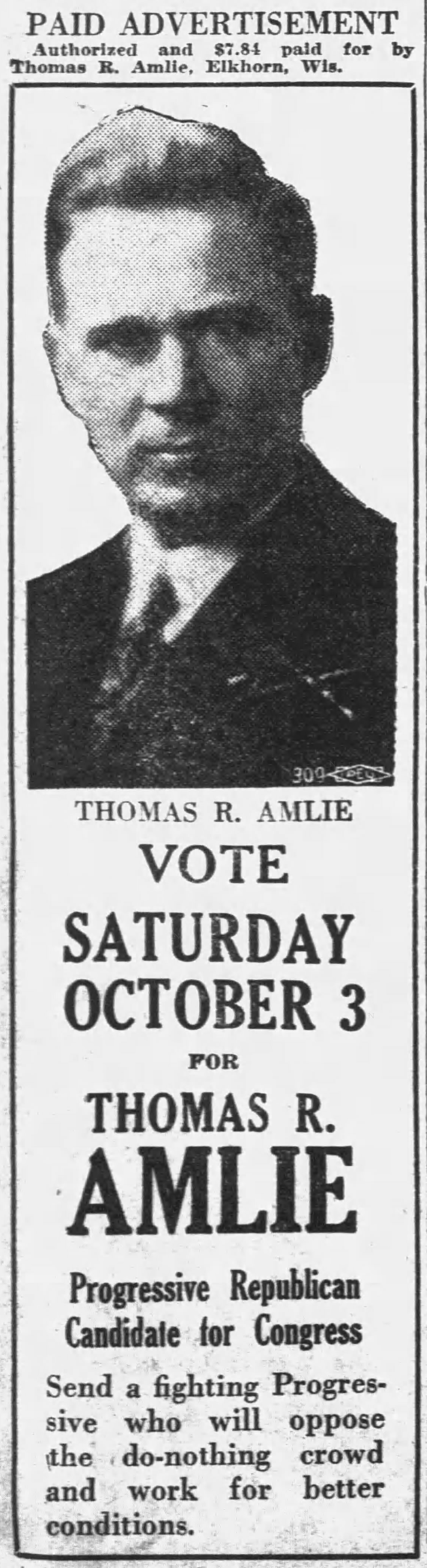
Newspaper advertisement promoting Amlie's candidacy for Congress, October 1, 1931

In October 1931, Amlie was elected as a Republican to represent Wisconsin's 1st congressional district in the 72nd United States Congress, replacing Henry A. Cooper who had died in office, and served until March 1933. He then switched to the Wisconsin Progressive Party, an alliance established in 1934 between the longstanding "Progressive" faction of the Republican Party of Wisconsin, led by the La Follette family and their political allies, and certain radical farm and labor groups active in Wisconsin at the time. He was reelected on the party ticket to the 74th and 75th United States Congresses and served from January 3, 1935, until January 3, 1939.

Amlie made his first run for U.S. House of Representatives in the 1931 special election, called following the death of long-time representative Henry Allen Cooper, who had represented his district nearly continuously from 1893 until his death. Cooper had represented Wisconsin's 1st congressional district, comprising roughly the southeast corner of the state. Amlie faced a crowded primary against state senators George W. Blanchard and Edward F. Hilker, and two other candidates. Amlie ultimately came out on top, defeating Blanchard by a margin of 1,332 votes.

In the lead up to the 1932 primary election, Amlie and Blanchard had garnered the backing of the progressives and stalwarts of the Republican Party respectively, with Blanchard even gaining the backing of the 1st district Republicans at their convention. In the primary election, Amlie and Blanchard were the only two Republicans to run. Blanchard won a narrow victory, defeating Amlie with 51.75% of the vote.

=== Progressive Party politics (1933–1934) ===
In 1933, Amlie helped form the Farmer-Labor-Progressive League.

In the Spring of 1934, the progressive faction split off from the Republican Party of Wisconsin and started the Wisconsin Progressive Party on the left, dramatically altering the politics of the state.

By 1934, the Great Depression had caused a sharp decline of conditions in Wisconsin, and this decline, alongside a resurgence of the Wisconsin Democratic Party, forced Progressive Republicans to seek new avenues to power. The first major figure calling for progressives to split from the Republican Party was Amlie. He was one of the most radical Republicans to have prominence within the party, and he "firmly believed that capitalism itself was dying and that Roosevelt could at most postpone the inevitable." Amlie was a proponent of the Frontier Thesis, believing that the existence of the Frontier allowed Americans to escape hard times by relocating to available lands. However, conditions had changed so significantly that such relocation was no longer possible, and thus Amlie believed in the necessity of a transition to socialism to save the country, a position he stated publicly at the League for Independent Political Action convention in September 1933.

One of Amlie's major goals was the formation of a regional left wing third party, a party that would unite rural and urban producers that could influence national policy. To this end, he began working with former governor Philip La Follette on forming a third party, and believed that under La Follette's leadership, the new party would take a leftward direction. Despite supporting these efforts, Amlie and his radical allies were blocked by Phil and William T. Evjue, the editor of the Madison-based Capital Times.

Separately from the La Follette led party, Amlie, alongside Appleton attorney Sam Sigman, former U.S. representative George Schneider, and former state senator Anton M. Miller, established the Farmer-Labor-Progressive League (FLPL), which would develop a platform and endorse candidates in elections, all of which the Progressive Party had yet done. Unintentionally, this new organization had the potential to upset the plans La Follette had been creating for the party. Fortunately, after La Follette spoke at the F.L.P.L. convention, the League decided to support his party.

By the end of July, 1934, Amlie had declined to seek a gubernatorial bid both for financial reasons, but also because he felt La Follette would be the best candidate to lead the Progressive ticket. While he would not run for governor, Amlie began a run for his old congressional seat. Later in November of 1935, he helped lead the formation of the Farmer-Labor Progressive Federation.

=== Return to Congress (1935–1939) ===
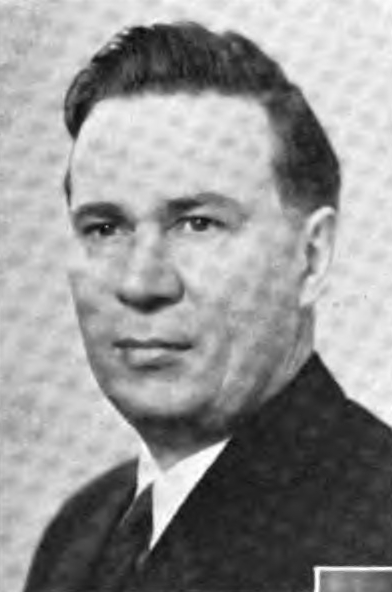
Amlie c. 1935

From 1936, Amlie and other Progressives were informally allied with the New Deal coalition and supported the reelection of President Franklin Roosevelt. Amlie had abandoned his hopes for a third party around this time for a similar reason that other progressives had, as he realized that "liberal reform would have to come via a Roosevelt-led Democratic Party."

In 1937, Amlie voted with the overwhelming majority of Congress to ban the exportation of weapons to either side in the Spanish Civil War. Just two days after the vote, his brother Hans was reported to have volunteered for the pro-Republican International Brigades. Amlie later supported a fundraising drive sponsored by the Friends of the Abraham Lincoln Brigade to bring wounded Americans home.

In 1938, Amlie joined Democrats Jerry Voorhis and Robert Allen in sponsoring the Industrial Expansion Bill, which would have created a planned economy in the United States.

In 1938, Amlie served on a committee for the defense of Fred Beal. Returned from the Soviet Union, Beal was facing recommittal in North Carolina where in 1929 as a union organiser he had been convicted in a conspiracy trial. He had been deserted by the Communist-controlled International Labour Defense because of the witness he was now bearing to the realities of Soviet collectivization. Serving with Amlie on the committee were Homer Martin of the UAW, Democrat Jerry Voorhis, the sociologist and pacifist Emily Greene Balch, the New York attorney and feminist Dorothy Kenyon and the poet Sara Bard Field. The Committee reported hostile pressure from members of the ILD and numerous anonymous threats.

In 1938, Amlie declined to run for re-election, instead seeking to challenge Senator F. Ryan Duffy in the senate election that year, but was defeated in the Progressive primary by Herman Ekern, the incumbent lieutenant governor, by 7 points. The primary would prove to be a bitter contest, as it reopened old divides in the Progressive Party between allies of La Follette and younger radicals. The divide also symbolized a split between the supporters of Robert M. La Follette and younger progressives who had emerged from the various farmer-labor organizations. During the primary, Ekern had garnered the private support of Philip and Robert La Follette Jr., while Amlie had gained the endorsement of Milwakee Mayor Daniel Hoan. Amlie would later blame his defeat on Evjue, The Capital Times, and even the Wisconsin Progressive Party itself.

== After Congress ==
After Amlie left Congress in 1939, Roosevelt nominated him to the Interstate Commerce Commission, but Amlie asked that the nomination be withdrawn.

Roosevelt eventually appointed Amlie as special assistant United States attorney in the Federal Land Commission office in Milwaukee. He eventually resigned this position to run for congress once again in 1941.

By 1940, Amlie had joined the Democratic Party as a "Roosevelt Democrat". Additionally, he supported other progressives leaving the third party and joining him within the Democratic Party. It was under this party that he ran in a special election that year for his old seat. He defeated Bernard Magruder by a wide margin in the primary election. In the general election, Amlie ran on supporting Roosevelt's domestic and foreign policy. He was defeated by a wide margin by Lawrence H. Smith.

Amlie later would run for the Wisconsin Supreme Court (in 1949) and U.S. House, from Wisconsin's 2nd district, but would never again hold elected office.

Returning from Washington DC, Amlie resumed the practice of law in Madison, Wisconsin, where he resided until his death.

== Personal life and family ==
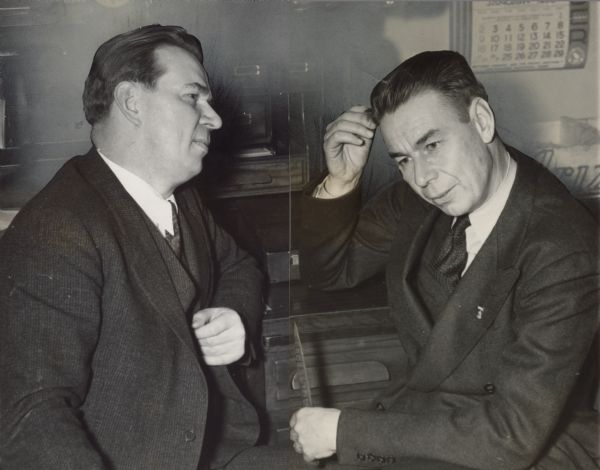
Amlie's brother Hans (right) shows him where he was grazed by a bullet in Spain, January 19, 1938

Amlie in 1925 was married to Marian Caldwell Strong, who died in 1930. Two years later, he married Gehrta Farkasch Beyer, who survived him. Amlie had 5 children, four sons and one daughter. He died on August 22, 1973, his remains were cremated and interred at the Sunset Memory Gardens, in the Forest Hill Cemetery in Madison, Wisconsin.

Amlie's brother, Hansford "Hans" Amlie, was a member of the XV International Brigade in the Spanish Civil War and fought on the side of the Spanish Republicans. Through his brother Hans, he was the brother-in-law of Milly Bennett.

== Electoral history ==
=== U.S. House, Wisconsin's 1st district (1931–1936) ===
Year	Election	Date	Elected				Defeated				Total	Plurality
1931 (special)	Primary	Oct. 3	Thomas Ryum Amlie	Republican	13,765	44.48%	George W. Blanchard	Rep.	12,433	40.17%	30,949	1,332
1931 (special)	Primary	Oct. 3	Thomas Ryum Amlie	Republican	13,765	44.48%	Thorwald M. Beck	Rep.	3,500	11.31%	30,949	1,332
1931 (special)	Primary	Oct. 3	Thomas Ryum Amlie	Republican	13,765	44.48%	Edward F. Hilker	Rep.	923	2.98%	30,949	1,332
1931 (special)	Primary	Oct. 3	Thomas Ryum Amlie	Republican	13,765	44.48%	T. O. F. Randolph	Rep.	328	1.06%	30,949	1,332
1931 (special)	Special	Oct. 13	Thomas Ryum Amlie	Republican	14,447	54.38%	Otis J. Bouma	Soc.	7,282	27.41%	26,569	7,165
1931 (special)	Special	Oct. 13	Thomas Ryum Amlie	Republican	14,447	54.38%	G. H. Herzog	Dem.	3,440	12.95%	26,569	7,165
1931 (special)	Special	Oct. 13	Thomas Ryum Amlie	Republican	14,447	54.38%	Henry H. Tubbs	Pro.	914	3.44%	26,569	7,165
1931 (special)	Special	Oct. 13	Thomas Ryum Amlie	Republican	14,447	54.38%	John Sikat	Com.	486	1.83%	26,569	7,165
1932	Primary	Sep. 20	George W. Blanchard	Republican	35,832	51.75%	Thomas Ryum Amlie (inc)	Rep.	33,401	48.24%	69,243	2,431
1934	General	Nov. 6	Thomas Ryum Amlie	Progressive	32,397	37.40%	Judson W. Staplecamp	Rep.	28,459	32.85%	86,625	3,938
1934	General	Nov. 6	Thomas Ryum Amlie	Progressive	32,397	37.40%	Ralph V. Brown	Dem.	23,532	27.17%	86,625	3,938
1934	General	Nov. 6	Thomas Ryum Amlie	Progressive	32,397	37.40%	Frank S. Symmonds	Soc.	2,237	2.58%	86,625	3,938
1936	General	Nov. 3	Thomas Ryum Amlie (inc)	Progressive	49,402	43.08%	Paul E. Jorgensen	Rep.	44,687	38.97%	114,686	4,715
1936	General	Nov. 3	Thomas Ryum Amlie (inc)	Progressive	49,402	43.08%	John N. Wolf	Dem.	20,597	17.96%	114,686	4,715

=== U.S. Senate (1938) ===
Year	Election	Date	Elected				Defeated				Total	Plurality
1938	Primary	Sep. 20	Herman Ekern	Progressive	79,885	53.02%	Thomas Ryum Amlie	Prog.	70,794	46.98%	150,679	9,091

=== U.S. House, Wisconsin's 1st district (1941) ===
Year	Election	Date	Elected				Defeated				Total	Plurality
1941	Primary	Aug. 8	Thomas Ryum Amlie	Democratic	3,683	73.48%	Bernard Magruder	Dem.	1,329	26.52%	5,012	2,354
1941	Special	Aug. 29	Lawrence H. Smith	Republican	29,638	63.62%	Thomas Ryum Amlie	Dem.	16,949	36.38%	46,587	12,689

=== Wisconsin Supreme Court (1949) ===
1949 Wisconsin Supreme Court election
Party	Candidate	Votes	%
First round (April 5, 1949)
Nonpartisan	Edward J. Gehl	128,996	20.4
Nonpartisan	Elmer D. Goodland	98,569	15.6
Nonpartisan	Harold Stafford	69,237	10.9
Nonpartisan	Thomas R. Amlie	61,759	9.7
Nonpartisan	Earl J. O'Brien	52,716	8.3
Nonpartisan	James Ward Rector	51,589	8.1
Nonpartisan	Mortimer Levitan	48,807	7.7
Nonpartisan	Marshall L. Peterson	45,446	7.2
Nonpartisan	J. Henry Bennett	28,409	4.5
Nonpartisan	Anthony E. Madler	25,602	4.0
Nonpartisan	William O. Hart	12,574	2.0
Nonpartisan	Peter F. Leuch	9,802	1.5
Total votes		633,506	100
Runoff election (May 5, 1949)
Nonpartisan	Edward J. Gehl	94,692	52.4
Nonpartisan	Elmer D. Goodland	85,928	47.6
Total votes		180,620	100

=== U.S. House, Wisconsin's 2nd district (1958) ===
Year	Election	Date	Elected				Defeated				Total	Plurality
1958	Primary	Sep. 9	Robert Kastenmeier	Democratic	20,922	66.83%	Thomas Ryum Amlie	Dem.	10,383	33.17%	31,305	10,539

== Notes ==
U.S. House of Representatives
Preceded by Henry A. Cooper	Member of the U.S. House of Representatives from Wisconsin's 1st congressional district October 13, 1931 – March 3, 1933	Succeeded by George Washington Blanchard
Preceded by George Washington Blanchard	Member of the U.S. House of Representatives from Wisconsin's 1st congressional district January 3, 1935 – January 3, 1939	Succeeded by Stephen Bolles
