= 1949 Wisconsin Supreme Court election =

- April 5, 1949 (first round); May 3, 1949 (runoff)

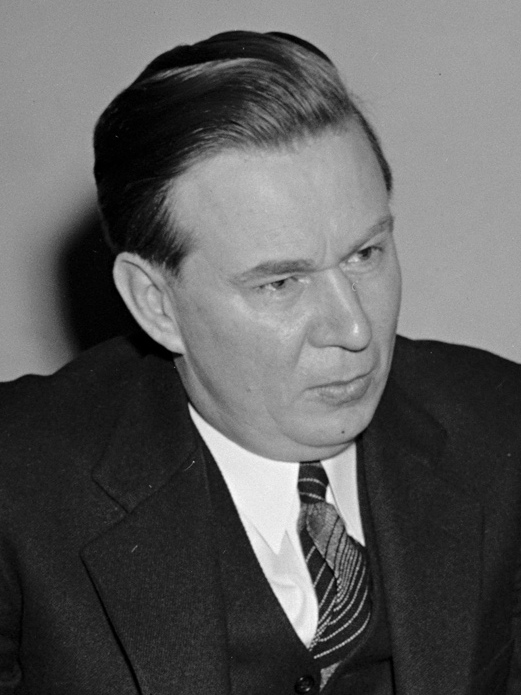

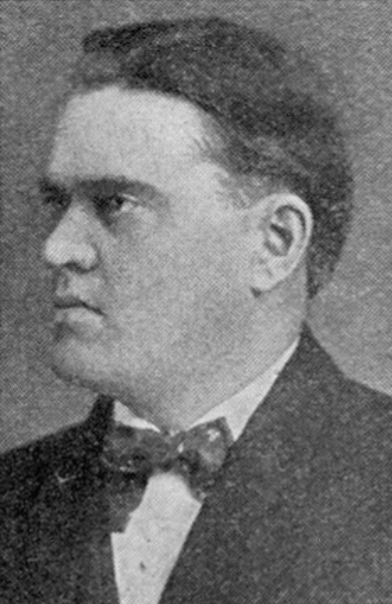
Candidate	Edward J. Gehl	Elmer D. Goodland	Harold E. Stafford
First round	128,996; 20.4%	98,569; 15.6%	69,237; 10.9%
Runoff	94,692; 52.4%	85,928; 47.6%	eliminated
Candidate	Thomas R. Amlie	Earl J. O'Brien	James Ward Rector
First round	61,759; 9.7%	52.716; 8.3%	51,589; 8.1%
Candidate	Mortimer Levitan	Marshall L. Peterson	J. Henry Bennett
First round	48,807; 7.7%	45,446; 7.2%	28,409; 4.5%
Justice before election
Marvin B. Rosenberry
Elected Justice
Edward J. Gehl

The 1949 Wisconsin Supreme Court election was held in the US state on Tuesday, May 3, 1949 to elect a justice to a full ten-year seat the Wisconsin Supreme Court.

It was the only Wisconsin Supreme Court election held under rules that required a contingent runoff election, only held if no candidate received an outright majority in an initial election.

== Candidates ==
The election featured a field of twelve candidates on the ballot.

=== Advanced to runoff election ===
- Edward J. Gehl, Washington County Circuit Court judge
- Elmer D. Goodland, Racine Municipal Court judge

=== Eliminated in first round ===
Stafford (photographed circa 1940) placed third, receiving the most support among those who failed to advance to the runoff

- Thomas Ryum Amlie, former U.S. congressman (Wisconsin Progressive Party), candidate in the 1938 Progressive U.S. Senate primary, Democratic Party politician
- J. Henry Bennett, lawyer, former member of the Wisconsin Senate (Republican), former member of the board of the Wisconsin Bar Association
- William O. Hart, printer, socialist activist, perennial candidate
- Peter F. Leuch, lawyer, former member of the Wisconsin Assembly, former Milwaukee city clerk, unsuccessful candidate for Supreme Court in 1944 and 1945
- Mortimer Levitan, attorney; director and treasurer of Milwaukee Legal Aid Society; director of Madison Bank & Trust; former assistant attorney general; son of former state treasurer Solomon Levitan
- Anthony E. Madler, former Wisconsin fuel administrator (1948), former legal council to the Wisconsin Department of Agriculture (1940–1948), former Chilton city attorney
- Earl J. O'Brien, lawyer, 1938 Republican nominee for Milwaukee County attorney
- Marshall L. Peterson, lawyer, former Green County judge (1938–43), former assistant district attorney of Green County, former public administrator, U.S. Navy veteran of World War II
- James Ward Rector, former justice (unseated in 1947), president of the Dane County Bar Association, counsel for the Wisconsin Public Service Commission
- Harold E. Stafford, Chippewa Falls-based lawyer, U.S Army veteran of World War I, unsuccessful candidate in the 1940 Progressive gubernatorial primary

== Campaign ==
=== First round ===
Rector was endorsed by the editorial board of the Wisconsin State Journal; while Amlie was endorsed by the editorial board of The Capital Times.

In a March 21 piece, The Editorial Board of The Capital Times condemned the Wisconsin press by large of failing to provide voters with information about candidates in the broad fields running in the elections for Supreme Court and superintendent of public instruction.

At a campaign event at the University of Wisconsin, Amlie quoted remarks made by the late Wisconsin chief justice Edward George Ryan in 1873 criticizing the influence of money in politics.

=== Runoff election ===
Because no candidate secured more than 50% of the vote in the initial round, a runoff election was necessitated. The coinciding superintendent of public instruction election also advanced to a runoff. This was under rules that were first enacted for this election, and which the state legislature would ultimately abandon later in 1949. Thus, 1949 is the only Wisconsin Supreme Court election to have been held with a contingent runoff.

During the general election, Goodland took a policy position in opposition of proposals for Wisconsin to eliminate judicial elections and adopt the Missouri Plan method of judicial selection.

== Results ==
1949 Wisconsin Supreme Court election
Party	Candidate	Votes	%
First round (April 5, 1949)
Nonpartisan	Edward J. Gehl	128,996	20.4
Nonpartisan	Elmer D. Goodland	98,569	15.6
Nonpartisan	Harold Stafford	69,237	10.9
Nonpartisan	Thomas R. Amlie	61,759	9.7
Nonpartisan	Earl J. O'Brien	52,716	8.3
Nonpartisan	James Ward Rector	51,589	8.1
Nonpartisan	Mortimer Levitan	48,807	7.7
Nonpartisan	Marshall L. Peterson	45,446	7.2
Nonpartisan	J. Henry Bennett	28,409	4.5
Nonpartisan	Anthony E. Madler	25,602	4.0
Nonpartisan	William O. Hart	12,574	2.0
Nonpartisan	Peter F. Leuch	9,802	1.5
Total votes		633,506	100
Runoff election (May 5, 1949)
Nonpartisan	Edward J. Gehl	94,692	52.4
Nonpartisan	Elmer D. Goodland	85,928	47.6
Total votes		180,620	100
