= Milly Bennett =

American journalist (1897–1960)

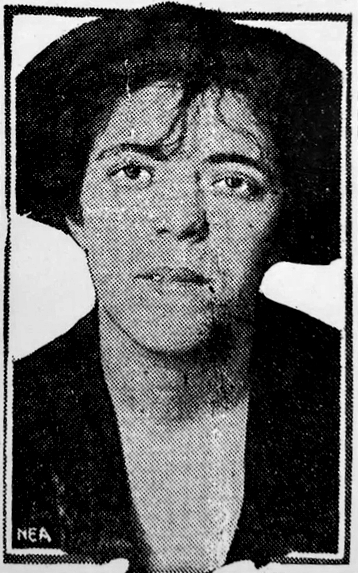
- Bennett c. 1920s
- Born: Mildred Jacqueline Bremler; May 22, 1897; San Francisco, California, U.S.
- Died: November 7, 1960 (aged 63); Stanford, California, U.S.
- Other names: Mildred Mitchell; Mildred Amlie
- Spouse(s): Mike Mitchell (m. 1921; div. 1926) Evgeni Konstantinov (m. 1931; div. 1936) Hans Amlie (m. 1937; died 1949)
- Relatives: Thomas Ryum Amlie (brother-in-law)

Milly Bennett (born Mildred Jacqueline Bremler; May 22, 1897 – November 7, 1960) was an American journalist and writer who covered political conditions in China, social conditions in the Soviet Union, the Spanish Civil War, and various events in the United States.

== Early life ==
Bennett was born on May 22, 1897, in San Francisco, California. She was graduated from Girls' High School in San Francisco in 1915 and then attended the College of Hawaii from 1915 to 1917.

== Career ==
As a journalist and a writer, Bennett, worked around the world under the pseudonym Milly Bennett. She also used her married names for her bylines, Mildred Mitchell and Mildred Amlie. She spent much of her career producing propaganda for the English language newspapers of communist governments in the USSR and China.

Bennett was a reporter at The Daily News in San Francisco from 1917 to 1921 and at The Honolulu Star-Bulletin from 1921 to 1926. While in San Francisco, she covered the trial of Thomas Mooney.

She was then the editor of the Chung-Mei News Agency in Beijing, China from 1926 to 1927. During the years 1927 to 1931, Bennett was a reporter for The Daily News, the Scripps-Howard News Service, and the United Press. She also worked on the Peoples Tribune in Hankou, China with Rayna Prohme. From 1931 to 1935, she was a reporter for the new Moscow News. For a time, she ran the Moscow bureau of the International News Service from her apartment.

In 1935 and 1936, she was a reporter for the Newspaper Enterprise Association, The New York Times, and the International News Service. In 1936 and 1937, she reported from Spain for the Associated Press, the United Press, and the London Times. She was also a staff member for the English-language section of the Press and Propaganda Service of the Spanish Government, working alongside her friend Kate Mangan. Taking the job in Spain allowed her to reclaim her ideals, instead of working for the "capitalist press," and to let her cover a war, which interested her personally.

In her memoir, On Her Own, Bennett describes living in the Soviet Union just before World War II broke out, living through the Spanish Civil War, life in China during the Northern Expedition, and her various other posts as a reporter. She also discusses her many love affairs and other highlights and disappointment in her life.

== Personal life ==
In 1921 Bennett married Mike Mitchell, but they were divorced in 1926. She moved to the USSR in 1931, and around that time she married Evgeni Konstantinov in Moscow. After Konstantinov was arrested for being a homosexual, she struggled to maintain her faith in the communist party. She visited him in his Siberian prison. They divorced in or before November 1936.

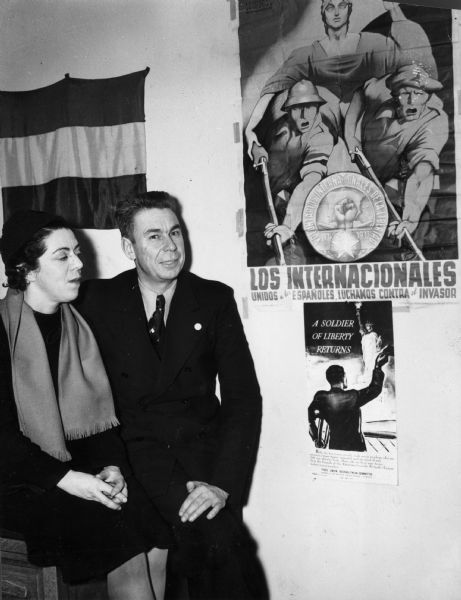
Bennett with her third husband, Hans Amlie, 1938

She lived in the USSR until December 1936 when she moved to Spain to fight the fascists. On December 1, 1937, she married Hans Amlie, a commander in the volunteer Abraham Lincoln Brigade and brother of Thomas Amlie. While in the USSR and briefly after she moved to Spain, she had an affair with Hermann Joseph Muller. She also had an affair in Moscow with Lindsay Parrott. While in Spain, Bennett had a brief love affair with Wallace Burton, an ex-pat fighting in the Spanish Civil War. Previously, while in China in the 1920s, she had an affair with his twin brother, Wilbur. She was pregnant while in Spain.

In January 1938, Bennett returned to the United States with Amlie. They set up a home in Mill Valley, California. She died in 1960.

== Communism ==
In late May 1937, her application for membership in the Communist Party of the United States was denied. Though she was instructed to wait until she had returned to the United States to apply again, she sent another application in October of that year while still in Spain. Though she attempted several times, she was never admitted as a party member.

After Bennett and Amlie returned to the United States, they were investigated and surveilled by the Federal Bureau of Investigation. The FBI believed Bennett to be a spy for the Spanish Republic.

== Selected publications ==
- Bennett, Milly (1935-11-10). "SOVIET RUSSIA DISCOVERS 'HOME, SWEET HOME'; The New Place of Women in the State Reflected in Stricter Social Laws". The New York Times. ISSN 0362-4331.
- Bennett, Milly (1993). On her own : journalistic adventures from San Francisco to the Chinese Revolution, 1917-1927. Armonk, New York: M. E. Sharpe. ISBN 978-1-56324-182-6. OCLC 1119537925.

== Legacy ==
Bennett's papers are held at Stanford University's Hoover Institution. The 2020 novel, Salt the Snow by Carrie Callaghan follows the story of Bennett.

== Works cited ==
- Kirschenbaum, Lisa A. (July 28, 2015). International Communism and the Spanish Civil War. Cambridge University Press. ISBN 978-1-107-10627-7.
