= Hans Amlie =

American soldier (1900–1949)

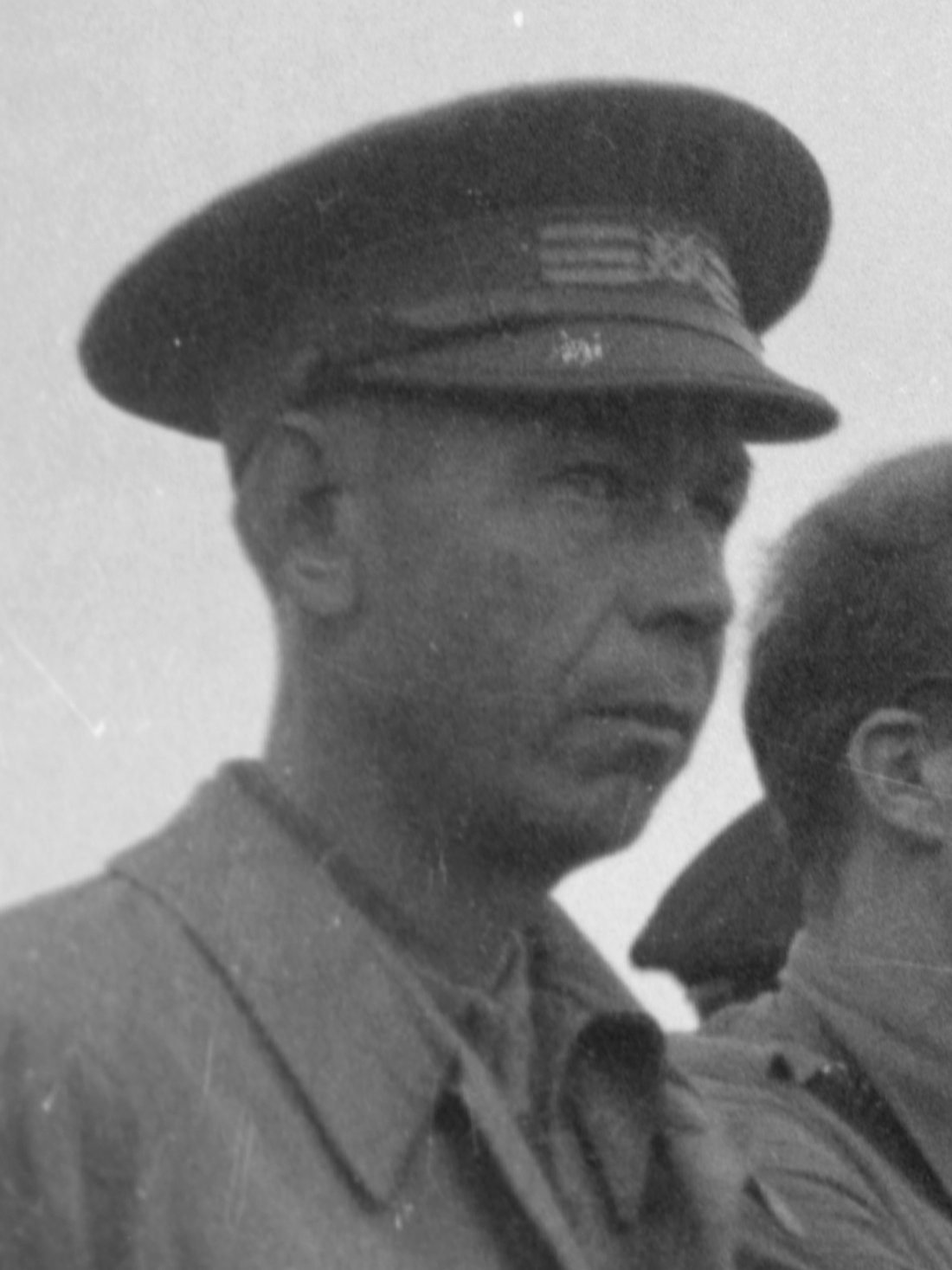
- Amlie in 1937
- Born: September 5, 1900; Cooperstown, North Dakota, U.S.
- Died: December 14, 1949 (aged 49); Somerton, Arizona, U.S.
- Military career
- Allegiance: United States; Spanish Republic
- Branch: United States Army; United States Marine Corps; International Brigades
- Service years: 1917–1919; 1919–1921; 1937
- Rank: Corporal; Private; Battalion Commander
- Unit: The "Abraham Lincoln" XV International Brigade
- Commands: Lincoln Battalion
- Conflicts: World War I; Western Front; Spanish Civil War; Battle of Brunete (WIA); Battle of Quinto; Battle of Belchite (WIA)
- Resting place: Golden Gate National Cemetery
- Education: Montana State School of Mines
- Political party: Socialist (before 1937); Communist (after 1937)
- Spouse(s): Margaret (m. 1920; div. 1939) Milly Bennett (m. 1937)
- Relatives: Thomas Ryum Amlie (brother)

Hansford "Hans" Amlie (September 5, 1900 – December 14, 1949) was an American mining engineer, political activist and soldier who served in the United States Army and Marine Corps during and after World War I and in the International Brigades during the Spanish Civil War. In the latter conflict, he rose from commanding the 25-man "Debs Column" to the 500-man Lincoln Battalion.

== Early life ==
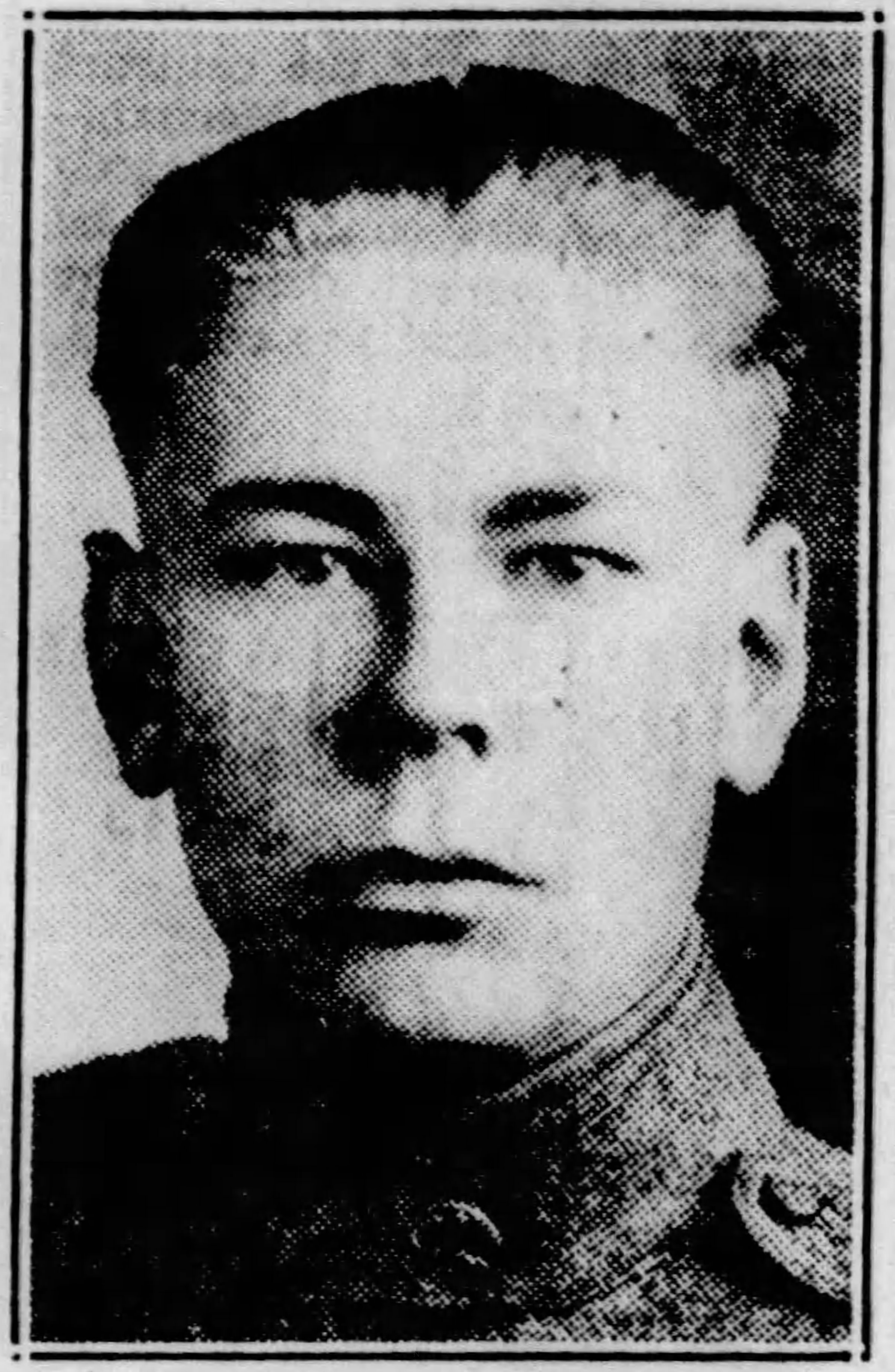
Amlie in his U.S. Army uniform c. 1917–1919

Hansford Amlie was born on September 5, 1900 in Cooperstown, North Dakota. His family was of Norwegian descent. He was active in radical politics as young as 14 years old, when he joined the Industrial Workers of the World following the Ludlow Massacre. He attended Cooperstown High School and was on the debate team with his brother, future congressman Thomas Ryum Amlie.

Following American entry into World War I, Amlie enlisted in the Army at the age of 16, serving in France as a Corporal. After the war's end, he re-enlisted in the Marine Corps in 1919, serving as a private until 1921. Some sources also give his rank as sergeant. During his second tour, he married a woman named Margaret with whom he separated in 1936.

After leaving the military, Amlie attended the Montana State School of Mines and became a mining engineer. Turning away from the declining IWW, he joined the United Mine Workers of America and supported Progressive Senator Robert M. La Follette in the 1924 presidential election.

During the Great Depression, Amlie moved to California and was involved in the labor movement there, taking part in the 1934 West Coast waterfront strike. By 1937, he was living in San Francisco and working as an orderly at the French Hospital.

== Spanish Civil War ==
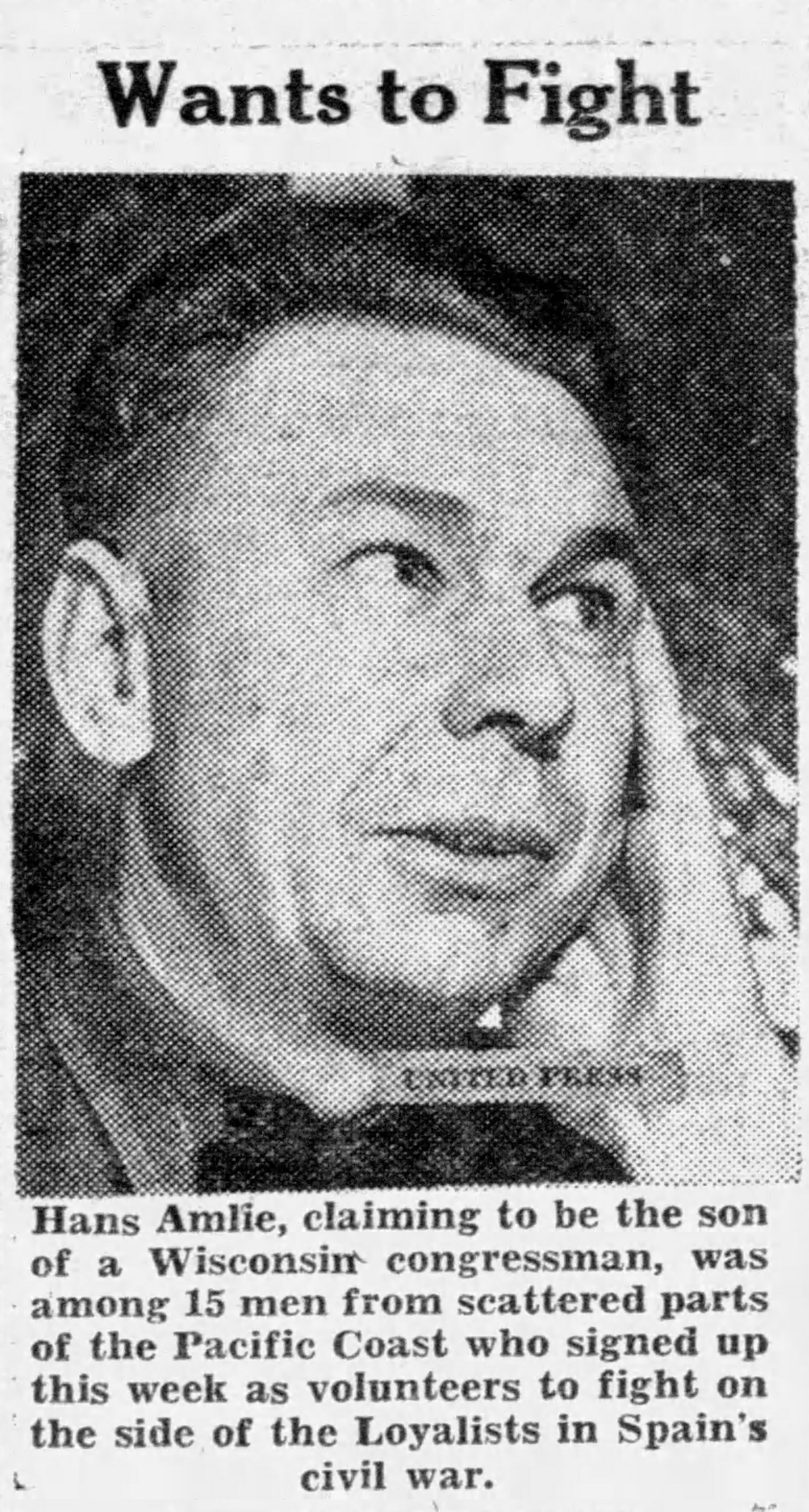
A United Press bulletin detailing Amlie's efforts to volunteer in the Spanish Civil War mistakenly identifies his brother Thomas as his father, January 9, 1937

Following the outbreak of the Spanish Civil War, the Socialist Party of New York put out a call for 500 men to form a "Eugene V. Debs Column" to join the pro-Republican International Brigades. Amlie, having been a member of the Socialist Party since he cast his first vote for Debs in 1920, answered the call and was chosen to lead the column. However, the officially pacifist national party was noncommital in its support for the column, and in the end only 25 men could be mustered. Amlie, disgusted by the party's actions, resigned to join the Communist Party.

Amlie arrived in Spain on March 17, 1937, joining the XV International Brigade's predominantly-American George Washington Battalion. He attended officer training school and was given command of the battalion's 1st Company ahead of the Battle of Brunete. Assigned to him as political commissar was civil rights lawyer Bernard Ades. During the advance on Villanueva de la Cañada, Amlie tried to lead his men out of a sniper's line of fire and was shot in the hip. As he later recalled:

I had gone only a few steps when I saw the head and shoulders of the foe lift. I knew that I'd made a blunder and started dropping. A bullet caught me low in the side and plowed through to the backbone. It felt as if I had been cut through the back with a hot cleaver. I remembered letting loose a long groan and thinking, "I've been killed," but I recovered my senses almost immediately. I had fallen in a small irrigation ditch a few inches deep. I was paralyzed from the waist down, but my arms were all right and my head was clear.

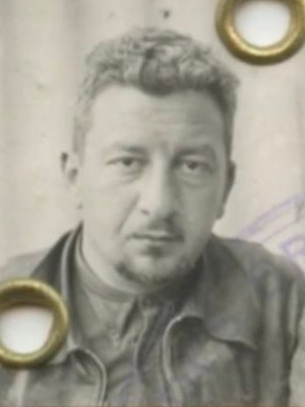
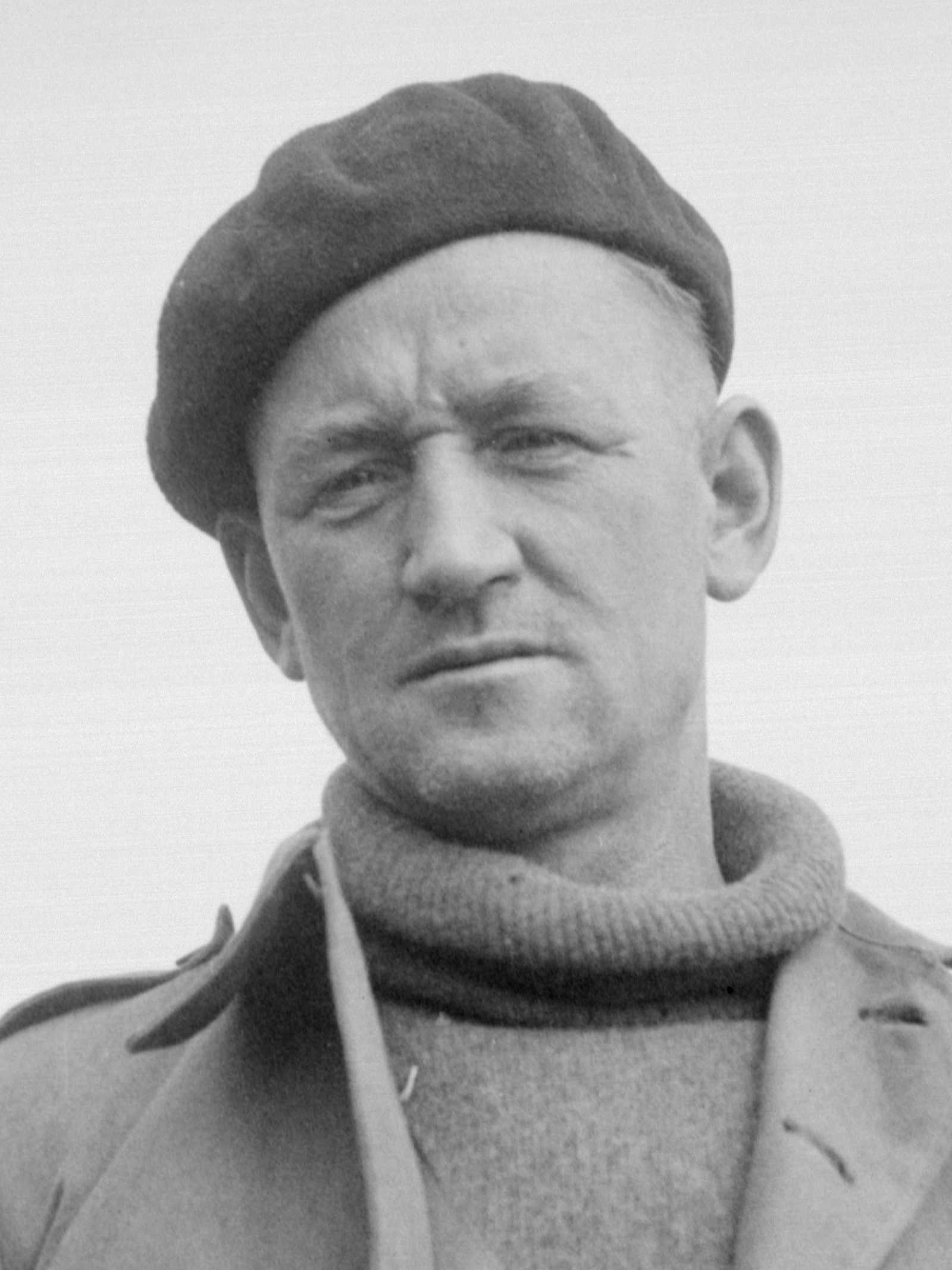
Bernard Ades (left) and John Quigley Robinson, Amlie's first and last political commissars

Amlie was eventually pulled to safety and hospitalized at the Ritz Hotel in Madrid. Upon his recovery, he was promoted to battalion commander of the reorganized Lincoln-Washington Battalion (now numbering less than 500 men after heavy losses), with Belfast-born International Seamen's Union organizer John Quigley Robinson assigned to him as battalion commissar. Deeply caring for the wellbeing of his men, one of Amlie's first acts as commander was ensuring those with poor eyesight had spare glasses in case theirs were broken in combat.

Amlie first led the battalion into combat at Quinto, where they were called on to reinforce the Dimitrov Battalion in a three-day battle that resulted in a Republican victory. Notably, the Americans led the assault, and did so with artillery, armored, and close air support, the first time they were afforded such luxuries. The town would subsequently serve as brigade headquarters for the next several months.

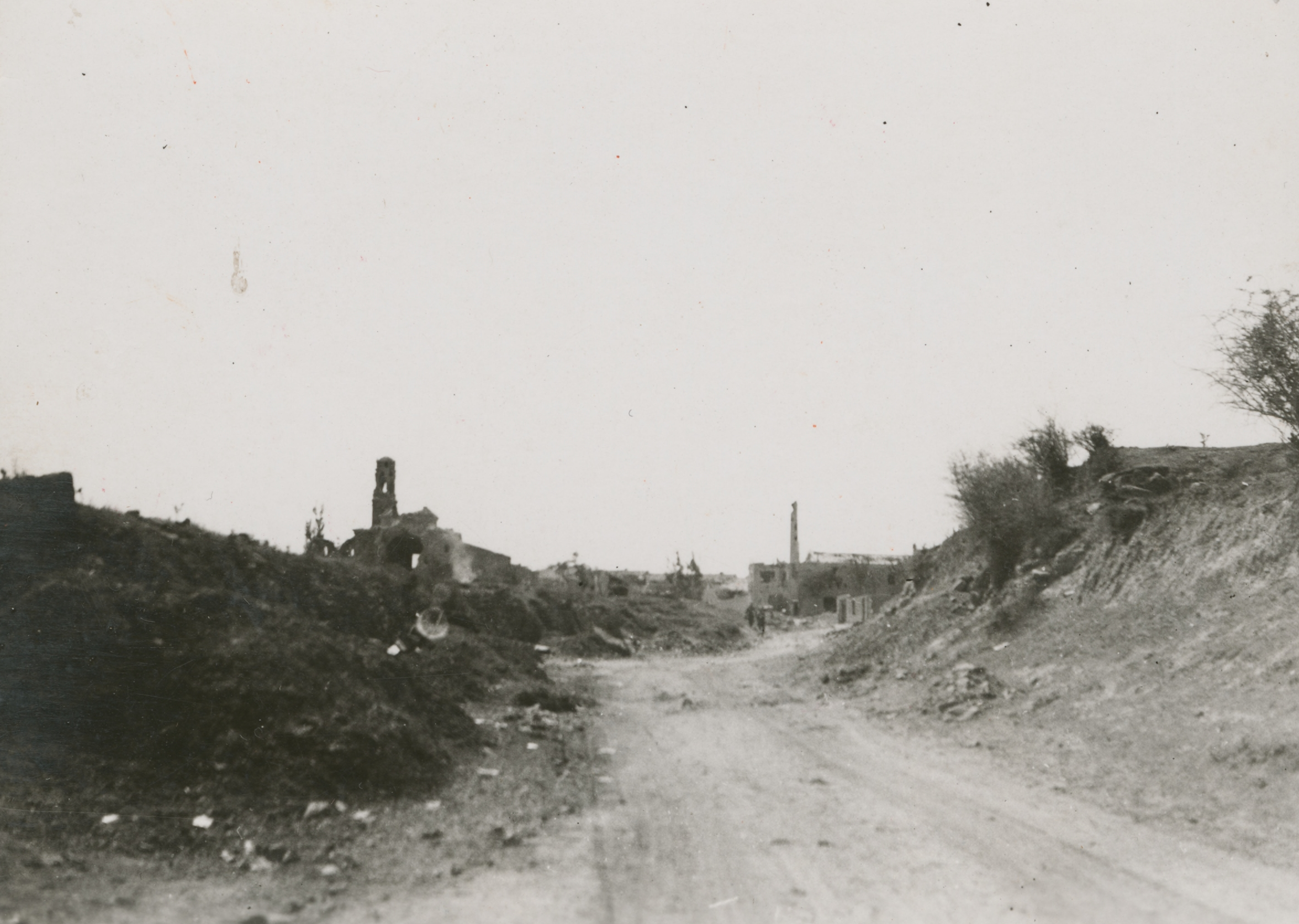
The approach into Belchite, September 1937

Amlie’s second and last battle as battalion commander would be at Belchite. After taking up positions in shallow trenches outside the town, he and his men came under heavy sniper fire. Unable to effectively take cover or retreat without being picked off, they were forced to attack. Without the support they’d had at Quinto, they quickly sustained heavy casualties; in one assault, 22 men were sent forward, of which 20 were killed and the remaining two could not make it. When brigade chief of staff Robert Hale Merriman came on the radio to order another attack, Amlie flat out refused, and was backed up by his commissar, Robinson. One of his subordinates, Wilbur Wellman (also from San Francisco), described the situation as follows:

...Amlie would not tell the men to continue the advance. When Amlie got the orders: "Either send your men and see that they go, or you face court-martial!" Amlie said to us: "What'll I do? Court-martial at the front means shot!" And we said, "Well, you just give us the order. You order us to go and then we'll refuse. Then you tell them to come down here and lead us, and we'll follow them!"

The situation was resolved when brigade commissar Steve Nelson came to the frontline himself and discovered a culvert than ran directly into Belchite, sparing Amlie and his men from another frontal assault. Though the Republicans were ultimately victorious, Amlie was again wounded, this time shot in the head. While the wound wasn't fatal, it was bad enough that he could not continue fighting and therefore had to be replaced as battalion commander.

== Later life and death ==
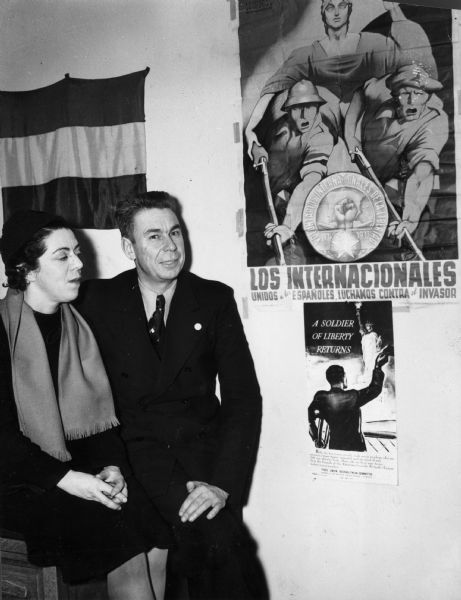
Amlie with his wife, Milly Bennett, shortly after their return to the United States, January 4, 1938

While recovering in a field hospital, Amlie met Milly Bennett, an American journalist sent by the Associated Press to cover the civil war. While in country, she had learned that an old boyfriend, Wallace Burton, was serving in the Lincoln Brigade, but by the time she reached the front he had been killed. She sought out Amlie, his commanding officer, to find out how he had died, and after getting to know each other Amlie and Bennett fell in love with each other. They were married on December 1 in a "deathbed marriage;" neither of them had the birth certificates required for a regular marriage, so a friendly doctor was convinced to provide paperwork that Amlie was on his deathbed. The couple returned to the United States on January 1, 1938.

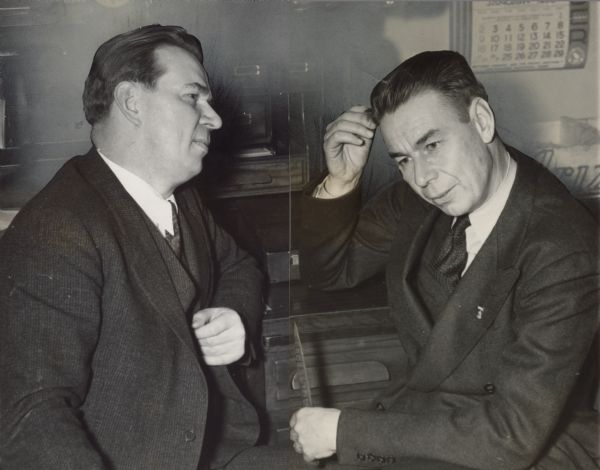
Amlie (right) shows his brother Thomas where he was grazed by a bullet in Spain, January 19, 1938

Upon his return, Amlie has his passport confiscated by the U.S. government for his involvement in the war. He then embarked on a continentwide speaking tour to raise funds and awareness for the Lincoln Brigade and the war in Spain. Even his brother Thomas, who had voted the previous year to ban the exportation of weapons to either side in Spain, raised money to bring wounded Americans home.

In December 1938, Amlie and Bennett moved to Mill Valley, California. By 1940, Amlie was working as a migrant camp superintendent for the California State Relief Administration. He was later hired by the Farm Security Administration and War Food Administration to manage similar camps across the Western United States. During and after World War II, he and his wife were investigated by the Federal Bureau of Investigation for alleged Communist activity, although little evidence was found and Amlie was allowed to continue working for the government.

Amlie died at a migrant camp in Somerton, Arizona on December 14, 1949. He had gone down into a cesspool to fix a clog in the septic tank, and as he was climbing back up he asphyxiated on the fumes and collapsed. Two migrant workers attempted to rescue him but died as well.

== Works ==
- "At the Battle of Brunete". Blue Book. Vol. 68, no. 3. January 1939. pp. 135–136.
