= Theodore Fritz =

American politician (1851–1922)

Theodore Fritz (August 27, 1851 – December 19, 1922) was a grocer and local politician from Milwaukee, Wisconsin, who served as a member of the Wisconsin State Senate from 1887 to 1888.

He was born in Falkenburg, Prussia, and moved to Milwaukee with his family in 1856. He attended public and private schools in Milwaukee, and became a grocer.

== Public office ==
In May 1882, Fritz was elected to the Milwaukee Common Council as alderman for the Sixth Ward to succeed Henry Smith, who had just resigned to become city comptroller. He would serve four more years on the Common Council. He became a member of the state executive committee of the Wisconsin People's Party, sometimes called the Labor Party (of which he'd been a founding member when in 1884 it was organized as a fusion of the Greenback Party and Anti-Monopoly Party), and was elected to the Wisconsin Senate from the 5th district (the 1st, 6th, 9th, 10 and 13th Wards of the City of Milwaukee, and the Towns of Granville, Milwaukee and Wauwatosa) in 1886 on the People's Party ticket, with 5,612 votes to 4,322 for Republican Fred. G. Isenring, 2,939 for Democrat Garrett Dunck, and 52 for Prohibitionist F. W. Wallace. He was assigned to the standing committee on engrossed bills.

Fritz was described in 1887 as, "smaller than the average of men; has light hair and beard, and blue eyes, and is modest in his dress. He has not had much to say so far, but has expressed his convictions by his votes." The Senate was redistricted, putting Fritz into the 4th district, and in 1888 he lost to the 4th District incumbent Republican John J. Kempf, with 5,262 votes for Kempf; 3,631 for Democrat August Rebhahn; and 1,301 for Fritz. In 1892, he was the Populist nominee for Wisconsin's 4th Congressional District, losing to Democratic incumbent John L. Mitchell, who polled 19,616 votes to 18,294 for Theobald Otjen, and 829 for Fritz. In 1900, he was the Populist nominee for Mayor of Milwaukee against corrupt incumbent David Stuart Rose.

== Heritage and private life ==
Fritz's son, Oscar M. Fritz, would become Chief Justice of the Wisconsin Supreme Court. He died in his son's home on December 19, 1922.
