= 1934 Wisconsin Supreme Court election =

- April 3, 1934
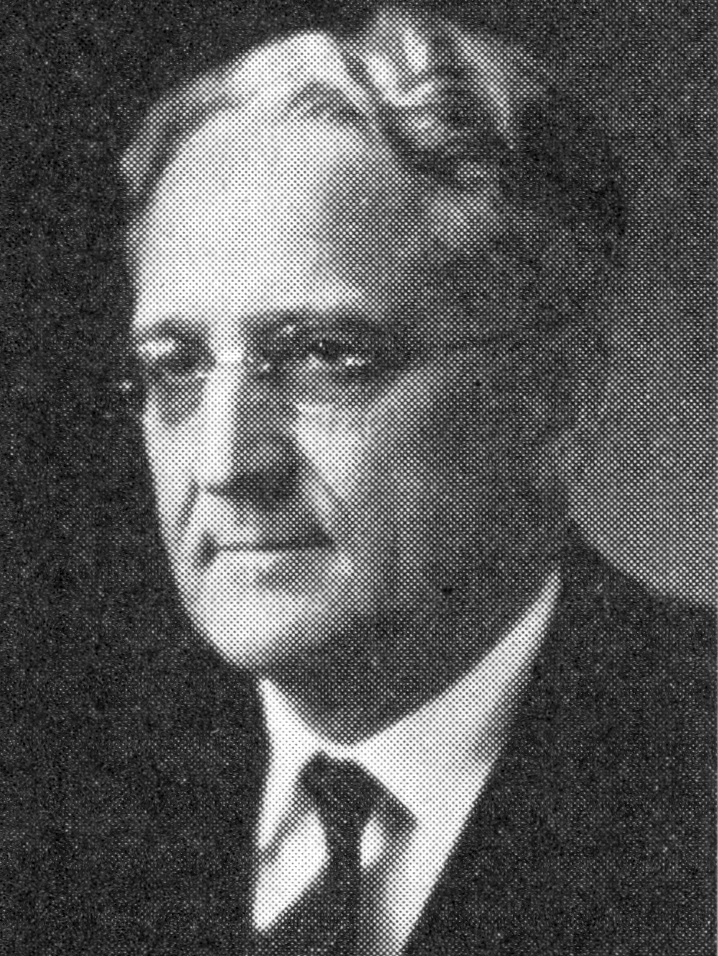
| Candidate | Oscar M. Fritz |
| Popular vote | 523,978 |
| Percentage | 100% |
Justice before election
Oscar M. Fritz
Elected Justice
Oscar M. Fritz

The 1934 Wisconsin Supreme Court election was held on April 3, 1934. It saw incumbent justice Oscar M. Fritz re-elected without opposition. Fritz had been appointed to the court in May 1929 by Walter J. Kohler Sr. in order to fill a vacancy.

== Results ==
1934 Wisconsin Supreme Court election
| Party | Candidate | Votes | % |
|---|---|---|---|
General election (April 3, 1934)
| Nonpartisan | Oscar M. Fritz (incumbent) | 523,978 | 100 |
