= Elkhorn, Wisconsin =

- City
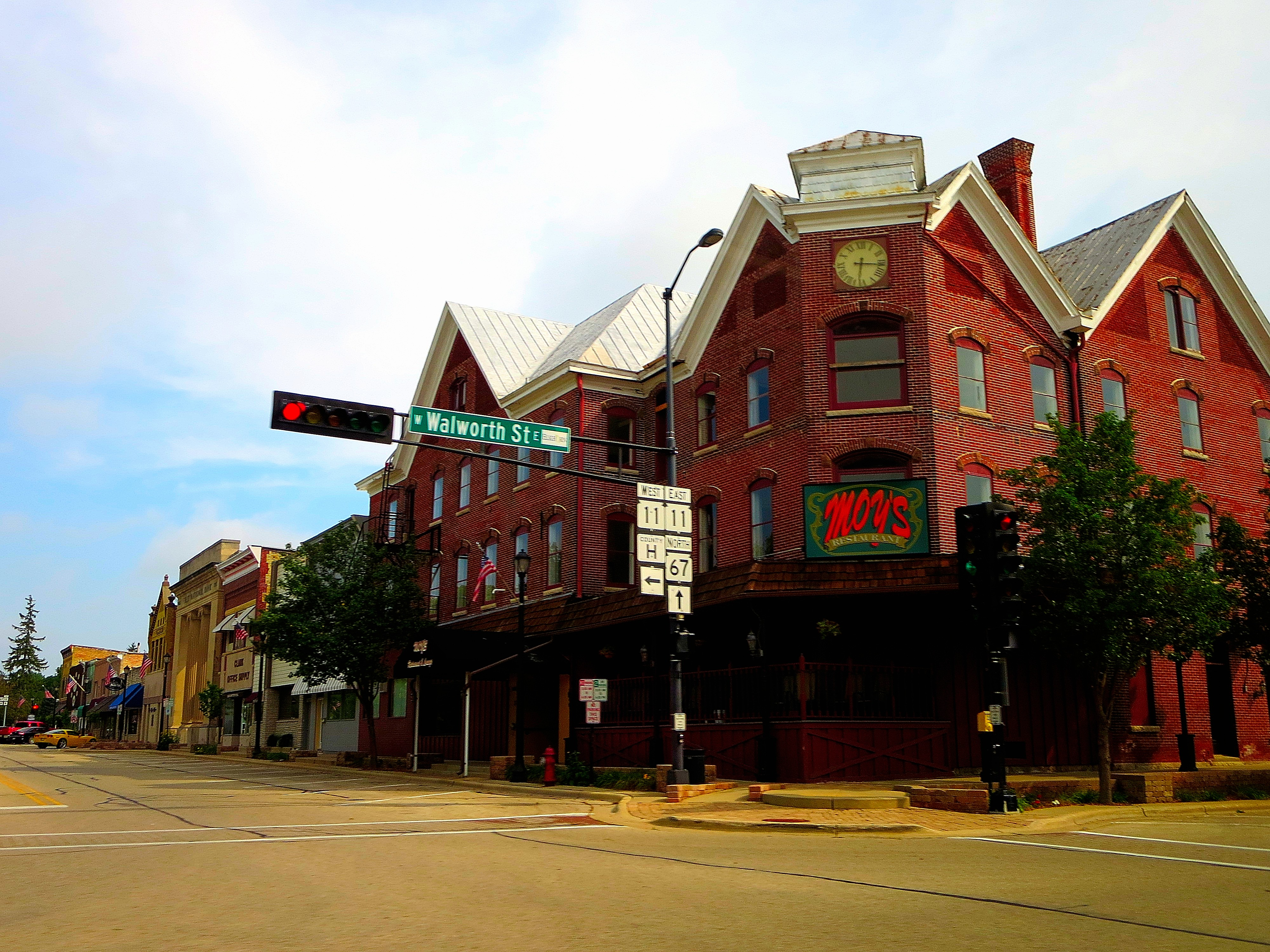
- Loraine Hotel building, downtown Elkhorn
- Motto: “Living in Harmony”
- Location of Elkhorn in Walworth County, Wisconsin.

- Location within Wisconsin Location within the United States
- Coordinates: 42°40′22″N 88°32′25″W
- Country: United States
- State: Wisconsin
- County: Walworth
- Incorporated (village): March 27, 1857
- Incorporated (city): May 17, 1897

Area
  - Total: 8.11 sq mi (21.00 km^{2})
  - Land: 8.06 sq mi (20.88 km^{2})
  - Water: 0.042 sq mi (0.11 km^{2})
- Elevation: 1,030 ft (314 m)

Population (2020)
  - Total: 10,247
  - Density: 1,242.6/sq mi (479.78/km^{2})
- Time zone: UTC-6 (Central (CST))
  - Summer (DST): UTC-5 (CDT)
- Zip Code: 53121
- Area code: 262
- FIPS code: 55-23300
- GNIS feature ID: 1564532
- Website: https://www.cityofelkhorn.gov/

Elkhorn is a city in Walworth County, Wisconsin, United States, and its county seat. It is located 40 miles (64 km) southwest of Milwaukee. As of the 2020 census, it was home to 10,247 people, up from 10,084 at the 2010 census.

== History ==
In 1836, Colonel Samuel Phoenix spotted a rack of elk antlers in a tree and proclaimed the area as "Elk Horn."

The area's beauty and fertile soil led Daniel Bradley, his brother Milo, and LeGrand Rockwell to create a community in the area. Its growth to a population of 539 led to the first town meeting in 1846. Elkhorn was designated county seat that same year because of its location in Walworth County.

In 1851, Elkhorn became the location of the Walworth County Fair, which is now hosted annually at the Walworth County Fairgrounds which lasts for six days having Labor Day as the last. The Walworth County Fair is the largest county fair in Wisconsin.

In the 1870s, saline water from springs located in Elkhorn was believed to cure rheumatism.

Because the city places Christmas decorations around its center, Elkhorn has been called the "Christmas Card Town" since before World War II. This tradition is celebrated every year by an annual oil painting by local artist Jan Castle Reed. These watercolor paintings are turned into Christmas cards.

Elkhorn is also known for the folklore of the Beast of Bray Road, a supposed werewolf type creature that has become the focus of books, documentaries, and other media including 2005 movie, The Beast of Bray Road.

== Geography ==
Elkhorn is located at 42°40′22″N 88°32′25″W (42.672900, −88.540342).

According to the United States Census Bureau, the city has a total area of 7.81 square miles (20.23 km^{2}), of which 7.76 square miles (20.10 km^{2}) is land and 0.05 square miles (0.13 km^{2}) is water.

== Demographics ==
Historical population
Census	Pop.	Note	%±
1850	42		—
1860	1,081		2,473.8%
1870	1,205		11.5%
1880	1,122		−6.9%
1890	1,447		29.0%
1900	1,731		19.6%
1910	1,707		−1.4%
1920	1,991		16.6%
1930	2,340		17.5%
1940	2,382		1.8%
1950	2,935		23.2%
1960	3,586		22.2%
1970	3,992		11.3%
1980	4,605		15.4%
1990	5,337		15.9%
2000	7,305		36.9%
2010	10,084		38.0%
2020	10,247		1.6%
U.S. Decennial Census

=== 2020 census ===
As of the 2020 census, Elkhorn had a population of 10,247. The median age was 38.2 years. 25.0% of residents were under the age of 18 and 16.3% of residents were 65 years of age or older. For every 100 females there were 97.7 males, and for every 100 females age 18 and over there were 95.3 males age 18 and over.

97.2% of residents lived in urban areas, while 2.8% lived in rural areas.

There were 4,084 households in Elkhorn, of which 33.9% had children under the age of 18 living in them. Of all households, 45.0% were married-couple households, 19.4% were households with a male householder and no spouse or partner present, and 27.5% were households with a female householder and no spouse or partner present. About 30.8% of all households were made up of individuals and 14.5% had someone living alone who was 65 years of age or older.

There were 4,223 housing units, of which 3.3% were vacant. The homeowner vacancy rate was 1.1% and the rental vacancy rate was 2.9%.

Racial composition as of the 2020 census
Race	Number	Percent
White	8,660	84.5%
Black or African American	91	0.9%
American Indian and Alaska Native	53	0.5%
Asian	126	1.2%
Native Hawaiian and Other Pacific Islander	0	0.0%
Some other race	450	4.4%
Two or more races	867	8.5%
Hispanic or Latino (of any race)	1,323	12.9%

=== 2010 census ===
As of the census of 2010, there were 10,084 people, 3,801 households, and 2,514 families living in the city. The population density was 1,299.5 inhabitants per square mile (501.7/km^{2}). There were 4,043 housing units at an average density of 521.0 per square mile (201.2/km^{2}). The racial makeup of the city was 91.4% White, 1.2% African American, 0.2% Native American, 0.7% Asian, 4.8% from other races, and 1.6% from two or more races. Hispanic or Latino of any race were 11.0% of the population.

There were 3,801 households, of which 38.8% had children under the age of 18 living with them, 48.7% were married couples living together, 12.5% had a female householder with no husband present, 4.9% had a male householder with no wife present, and 33.9% were non-families. 27.8% of all households were made up of individuals, and 11% had someone living alone who was 65 years of age or older. The average household size was 2.53 and the average family size was 3.11.

The median age in the city was 34.3 years. 27.5% of residents were under the age of 18; 8.2% were between the ages of 18 and 24; 29.1% were from 25 to 44; 23.3% were from 45 to 64; and 11.9% were 65 years of age or older. The gender makeup of the city was 49.7% male and 50.3% female.

=== 2000 census ===
As of the census of 2000, there were 7,305 people, 2,919 households, and 1,903 families living in the city. The population density was 1,005.2 people per square mile (388.0/km^{2}). There were 3,014 housing units at an average density of 414.7 per square mile (160.1/km^{2}). The racial makeup of the city was 94.81% White, 0.47% African American, 0.40% Native American, 0.55% Asian, 0.03% Pacific Islander, 2.83% from other races, and 0.92% from two or more races. Hispanic or Latino of any race were 6.13% of the population.

There were 2,919 households, out of which 37.2% had children under the age of 18 living with them, 48.6% were married couples living together, 12.1% had a female householder with no husband present, and 34.8% were non-families. 28.5% of all households were made up of individuals, and 11.2% had someone living alone who was 65 years of age or older. The average household size was 2.48 and the average family size was 3.07.

In the city, the population was spread out, with 28.0% under the age of 18, 8.7% from 18 to 24, 32.2% from 25 to 44, 18.3% from 45 to 64, and 12.8% who were 65 years of age or older. The median age was 34 years. For every 100 females, there were 91.4 males. For every 100 females age 18 and over, there were 87.5 males.

The median income for a household in the city was $38,395, and the median income for a family was $47,475. Males had a median income of $34,867 versus $22,253 for females. The per capita income for the city was $20,003. About 7.4% of families and 9.9% of the population were below the poverty line, including 12.7% of those under age 18 and 10.1% of those age 65 or over.

== Transportation ==
Elkhorn was a stop on the Racine & Southwestern branch line of the Chicago, Milwaukee, St. Paul and Pacific Railroad, better known as the Milwaukee Road. In its 1980 bankruptcy, the Milwaukee Road disposed of the Southwestern Line. The Wisconsin & Southern continues to service Elkhorn from a connection at Bardwell to the west.

== Notable people ==
- Lucius Allen, Wisconsin State Assembly
- Thomas Ryum Amlie, U.S. Representative
- Tom Bigelow, racing driver
- Charles Coleman, Wisconsin State Assembly
- Ely B. Dewing, Wisconsin State Assembly
- Charles Dunlap, Wisconsin State Assembly
- Sidney Clayton Goff, Wisconsin State Assembly
- John Harris, Wisconsin State Senator
- William H. Hurlbut, Wisconsin State Assembly
- Greg Kent, NFL Player
- Jay G. Lamberson, Wisconsin State Assembly
- Hollis Latham, Wisconsin State Assembly
- Tallan Noble Latz, musician
- John Raleigh, MLB player
- Eldo T. Ridgway, Wisconsin State Senator, mayor of Elkhorn
- Jim Roslof, fantasy artist
- James D. Swan, Wisconsin State Senator
- Patrick Smage, motorcycle racer
- James Michael Ward III, game designer and fantasy author
- Joseph Philbrick Webster, composer of In the Sweet By-and-By
- Clarence J. Wilger, Wisconsin State Assembly

== Images ==
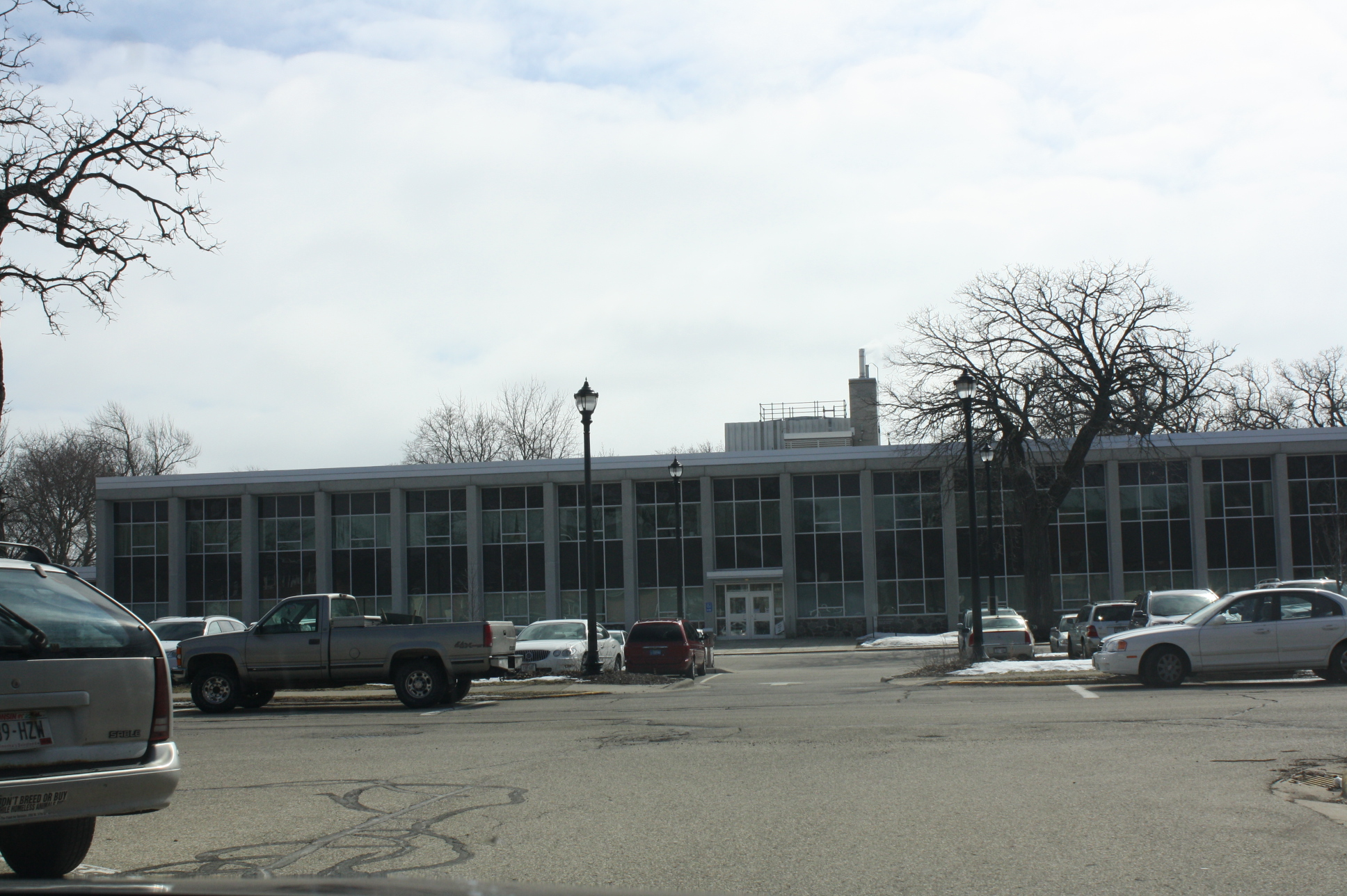
Police department and Municipal Court

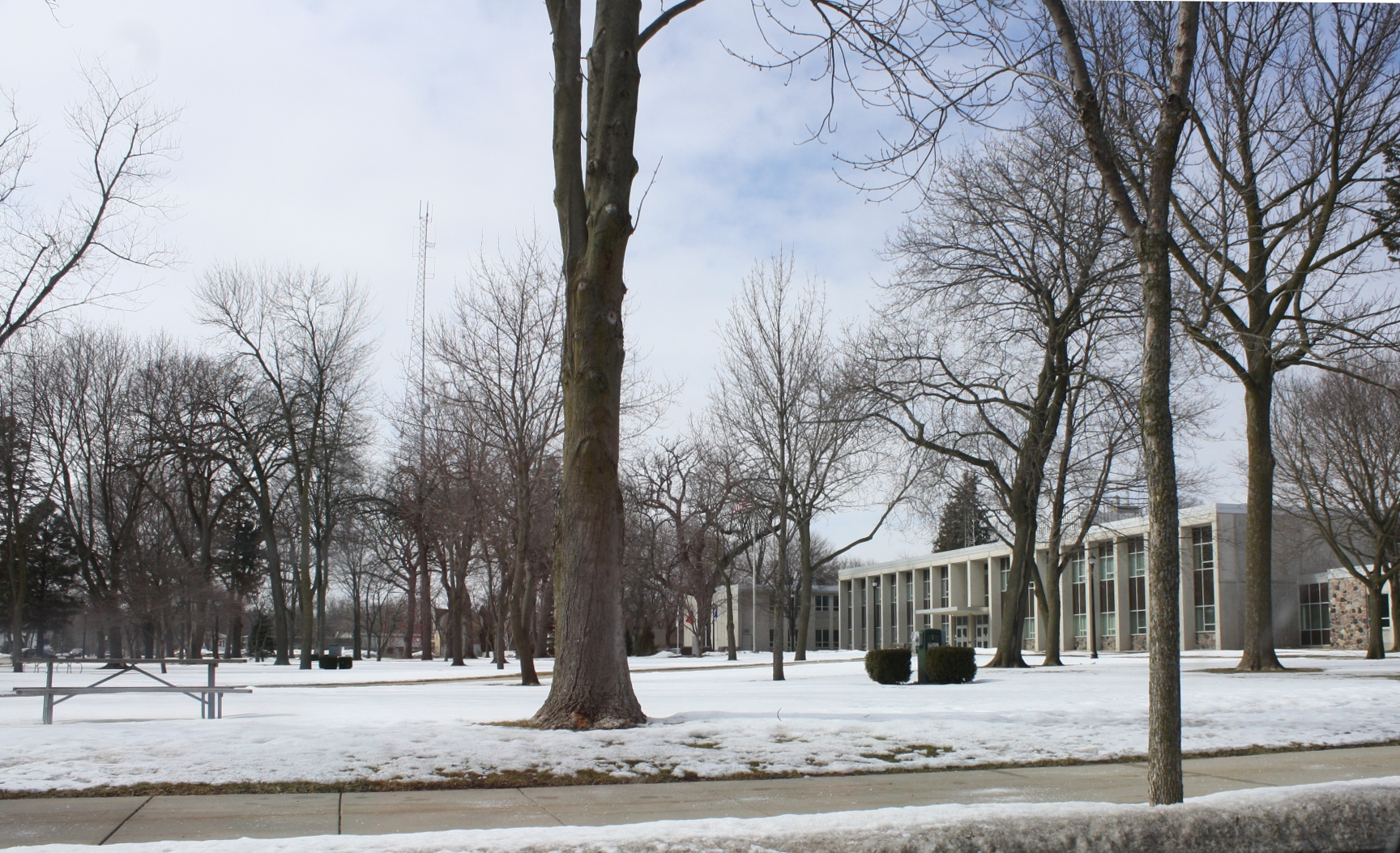
Park in town square

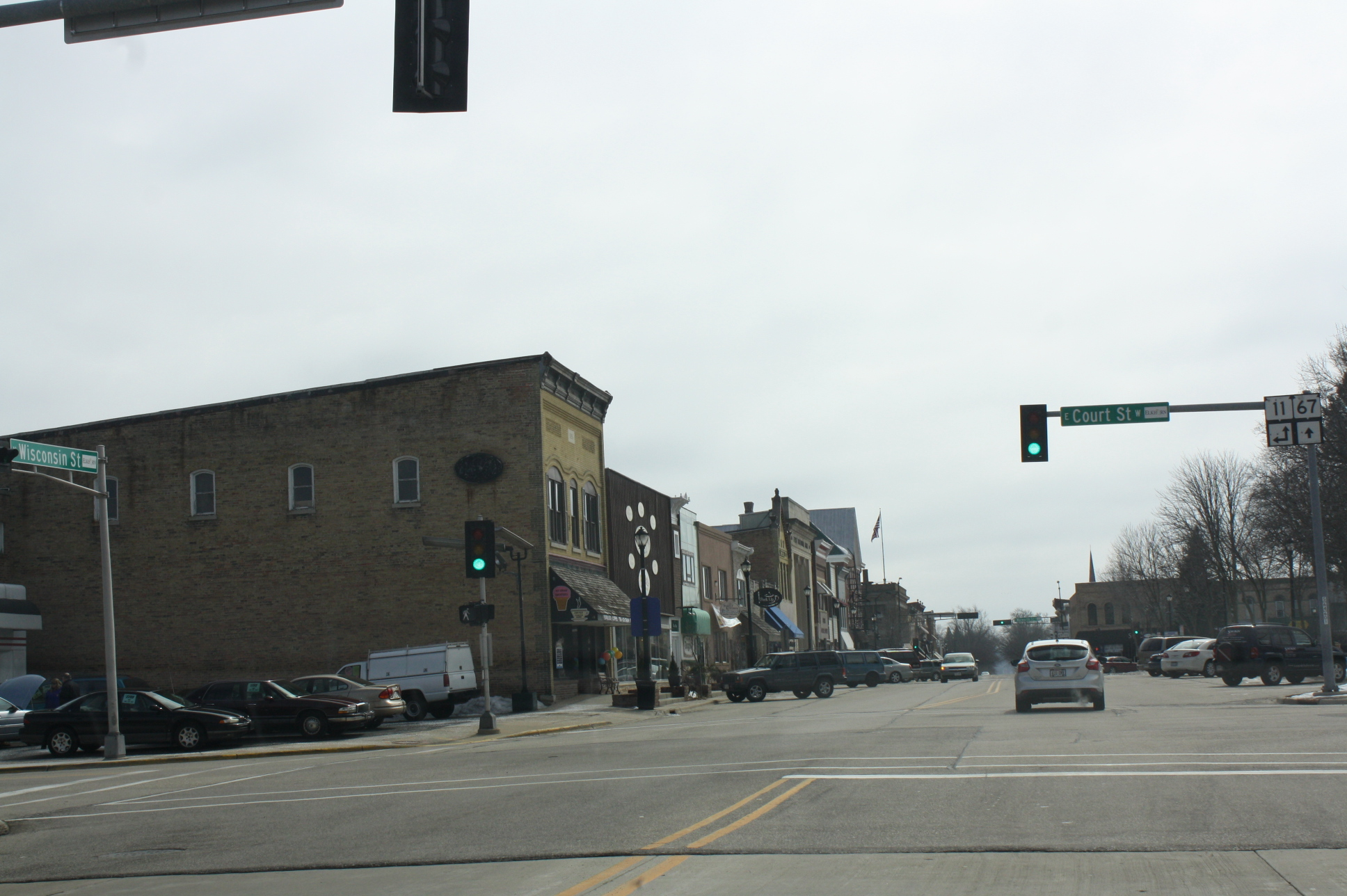
Downtown looking south

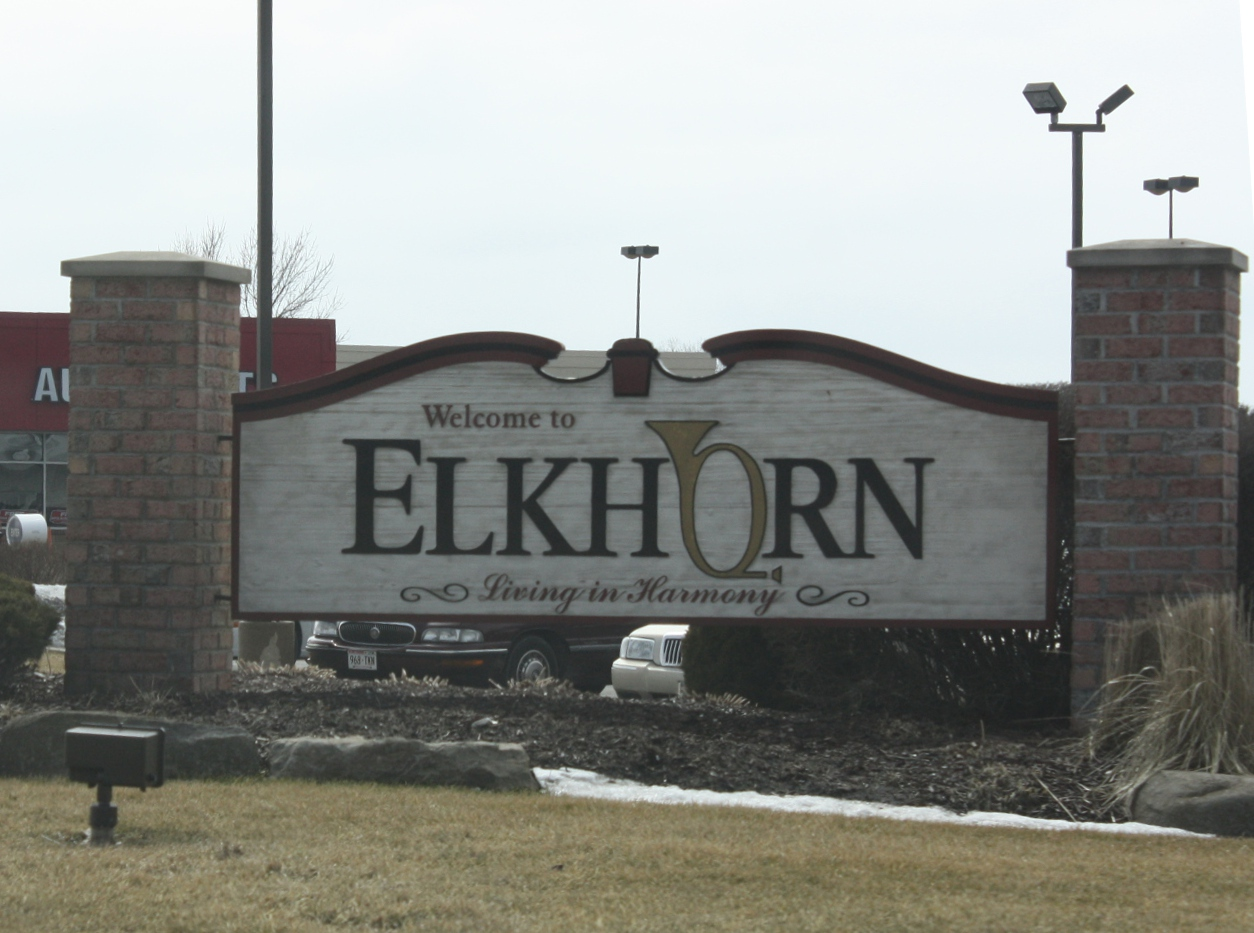
Welcome sign

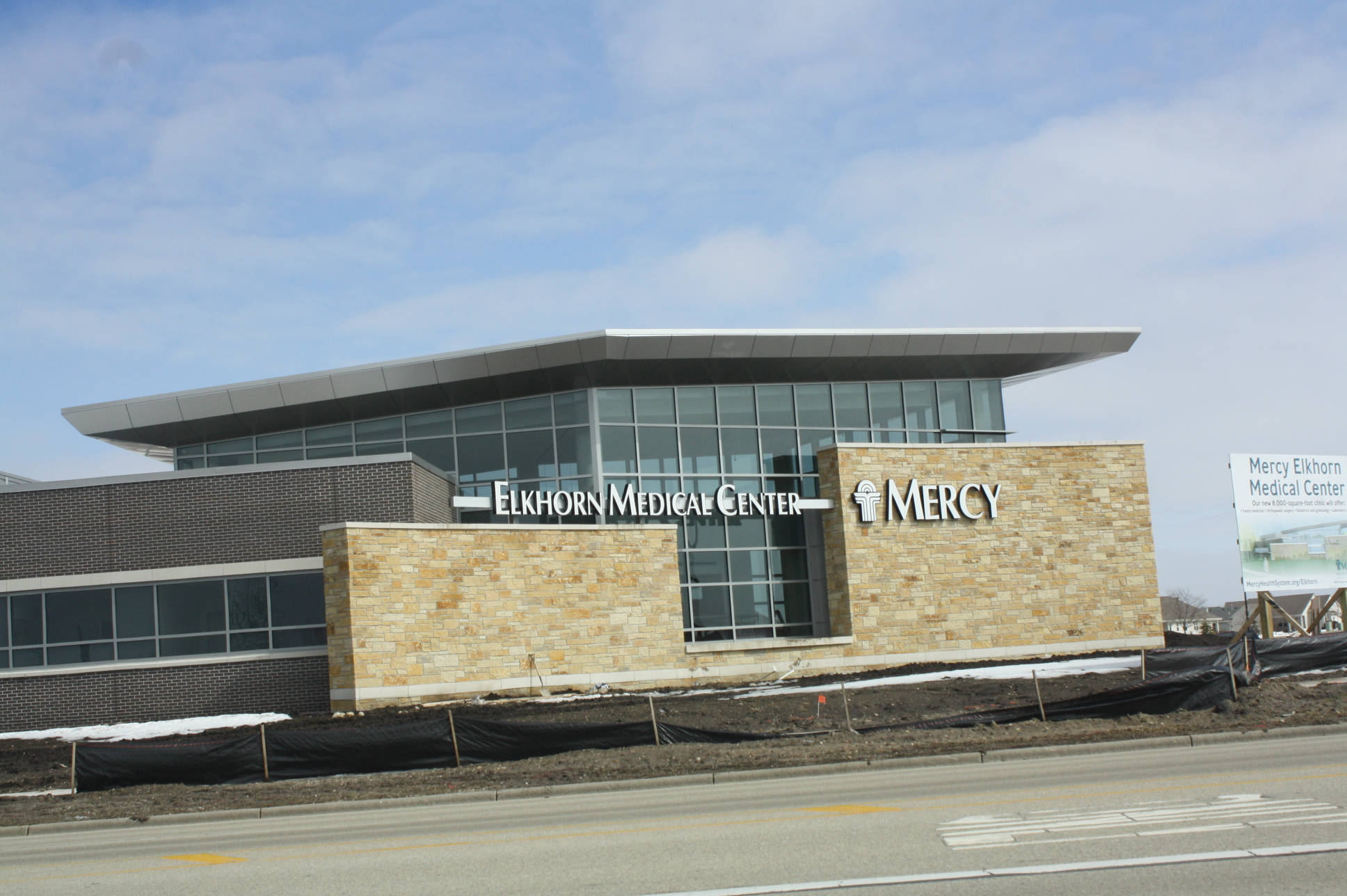
Mercy Elkhorn Medical Center

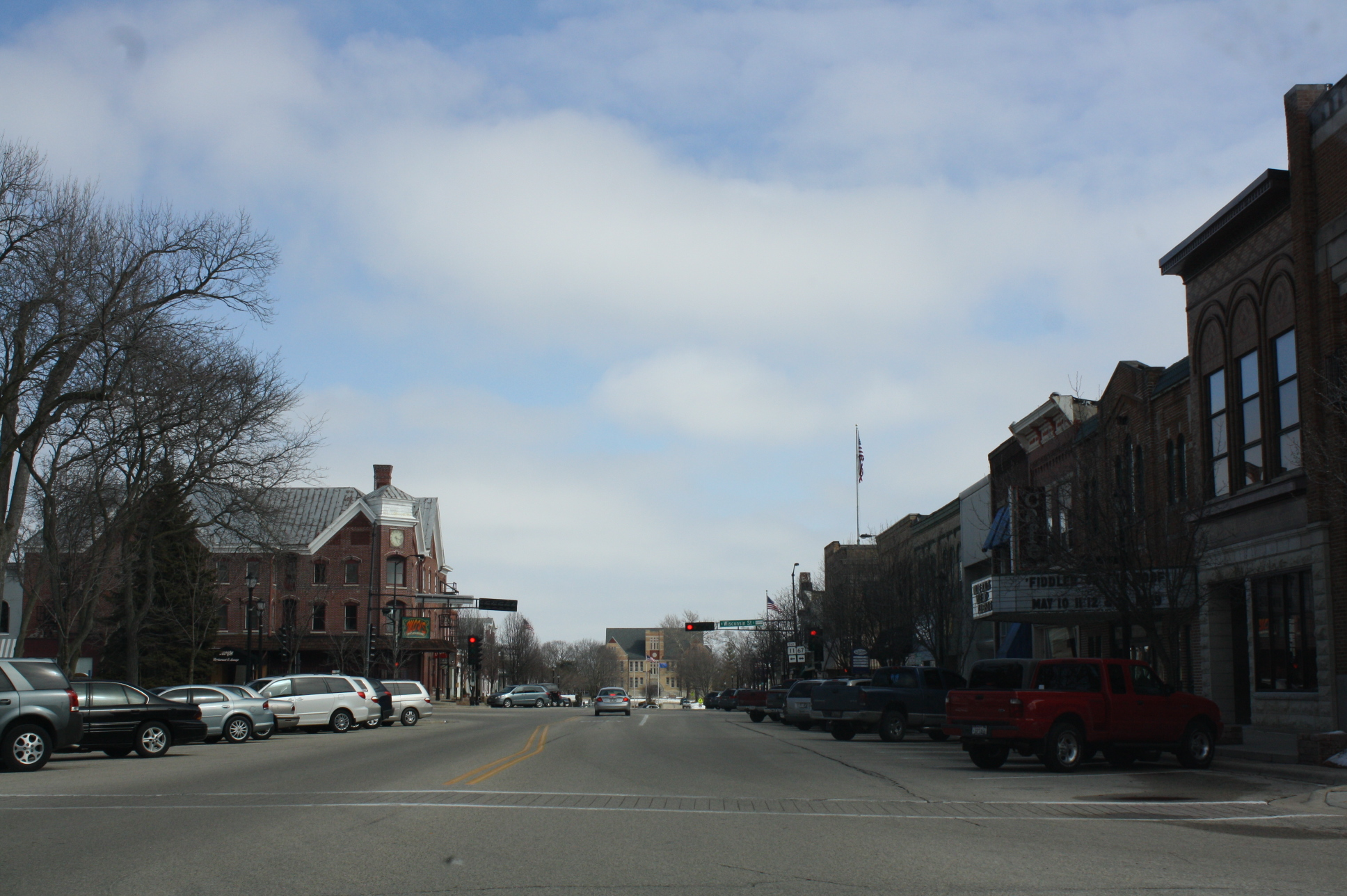
Southern town square
