= Lucius Allen (politician) =

American politician

Lucius Allen (February 13, 1816 – January 12, 1895) was a member of the Wisconsin State Assembly from East Troy, Wisconsin.

== Biography ==
Allen was born on February 13, 1816, in Hamburg, New York. He married four times. First, to Mary Spoor on May 27, 1837. They had a son before her death on November 15, 1838. Second, to Sarah Ann Barnes on July 10, 1842. They had two children before her death in 1847. Allen married Sarah Ann's sister in August 1848. They had five children before her death on March 11, 1878. Finally, he married Hephsibah A. Babcock on September 4, 1890. Allen died on January 12, 1895, in Elkhorn, Wisconsin, and was buried there.

== Career ==
Allen was a member of the Assembly in 1864. Other positions he held include being a member of the county board of Walworth County, Wisconsin, in 1877.
