= Milwaukee Law School =

Former law school in Milwaukee, Wisconsin

The Milwaukee Law School, founded in 1892 as the Milwaukee Law Class, was a law school in Milwaukee, Wisconsin which originated as a student-owned cooperative with two volunteer instructors. It later added additional professors, and in 1896 changed its name to Milwaukee Law School. It operated as a night school, holding classes in rented spaces in downtown Milwaukee. In 1908 it was acquired, along with Milwaukee University Law School, to become the core of Marquette University Law School.

== Notable alumni ==
- Max E. Binner, member of the Wisconsin State Assembly
- Oscar M. Fritz, chief justice of the Wisconsin Supreme Court
- Peter F. Leuch, member of the Wisconsin State Assembly
- William L. Richards, member of the Wisconsin State Senate
- Lawrence J. Timmerman, member of the Wisconsin State Assembly (graduated after the merger into MULS)
- George Weissleder, member of the Wisconsin State Senate

== See also ==
- List of defunct law schools in the United States
