= Walworth County Fairgrounds =

Fairgrounds for a county in Wisconsin, U.S.

Coordinates: 42°40′34″N 88°32′05″W

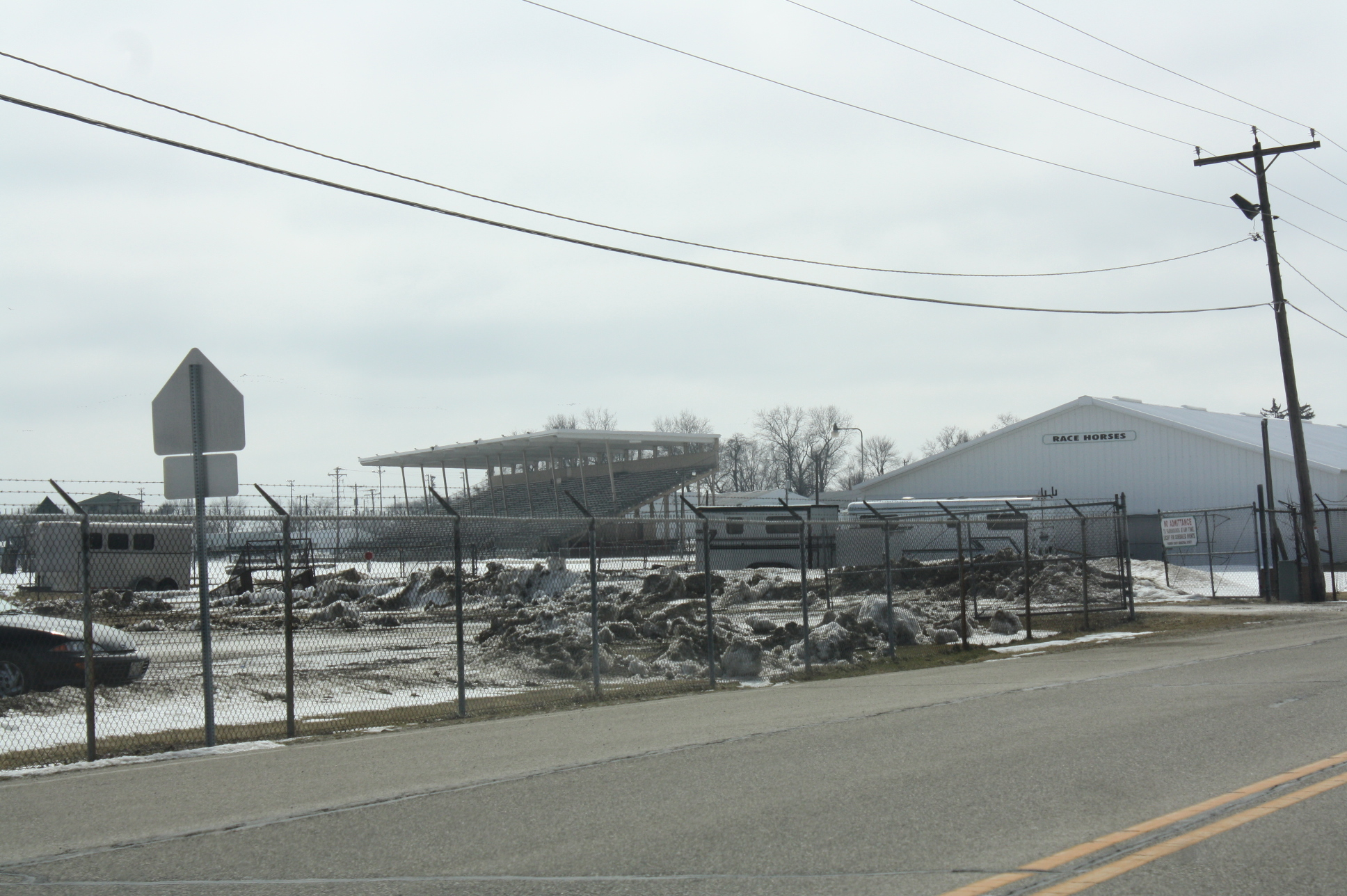
Grandstands and race track

The Walworth County Fairgrounds is an almost 99-acre (400,000 m^{2}) plot of land located in Elkhorn, Wisconsin, Walworth County, Wisconsin, United States and owned by the Walworth County Agricultural Society.

== History ==
The Walworth County Agricultural Society was founded April 28, 1842. The first annual fair and cattle show of which there is a record was held in the Village of East Troy on October 16, 1850. A total of 35 first premiums, 17 second premiums and 3 third premiums were awarded that year.

The first county fair held in Elkhorn was in 1851, in the block southwest of the Elkhorn City Park. In 1853 the fair site was moved to Delavan, but returned to Elkhorn in 1854. In 1855, the first purchase of land, from Colonel Edward Elderkin, was made, consisting of 6 acres (24,000 m^{2}) in the Village of Elkhorn. The cost was $100.00 per acre with 10% interest, a high price for the time. The city of Elkhorn donated $300.00 to fence the land, erect pens and sheds, and dig wells. Since 1855 the fair has remained on the same site.

Many fair visitors at that time came by train. At one time, there were 19 special trains that unloaded daily and left each evening after the races from the fairgrounds. They came from Libertyville, Rockford, and Freeport, Illinois, and Walworth, Janesville, Beloit, Madison, Milwaukee and Waukesha, Wisconsin.

1933 was the beginning of night shows at the Walworth County Fair, such as the WLS Entertainers. That year also marked the first time that the fair opened on Sunday.

The Walworth County Fair was a "dry" fair until 2021. The fair is known for its harness racing, and is one of the last county fairs to hold such races.

A newer tradition that is quickly gaining popularity is an event called Walworth County Fair Country Idol. The contest consists of three parts: auditions, semifinals, and finals. Auditions are usually held at the Walworth County Fairgrounds in early to mid June, with semi-finals and finals occurring near or during the annual fair. There is also a similar contest for "Juniors" held on the"Barnyard Adventure Stage" during the fair.

Some of the acts that have performed at the fair include Kenny Rogers, Brad Paisley, Kenny Chesney, The Beach Boys, Styx, Insane Clown Posse, Lonestar, Travis Tritt, Randy Travis, Bobby Vinton, Terri Clark, KC & the Sunshine Band, LeAnn Rimes, Billy Ray Cyrus, Huey Lewis and the News, REO Speedwagon, Carrot Top, Avalon, Sawyer Brown, Alabama, The Statler Brothers, Barbara Mandrell, Newsboys, and for KING & COUNTRY. The 2015 edition of the fair features performers Charlie Daniels and Cheap Trick.

The articles of incorporation for the Walworth County Agricultural Society were signed on April 5, 1965 by the Secretary of State.

Today, the land owned by the association is approximately 99 acres (400,000 m^{2}).

== Images ==
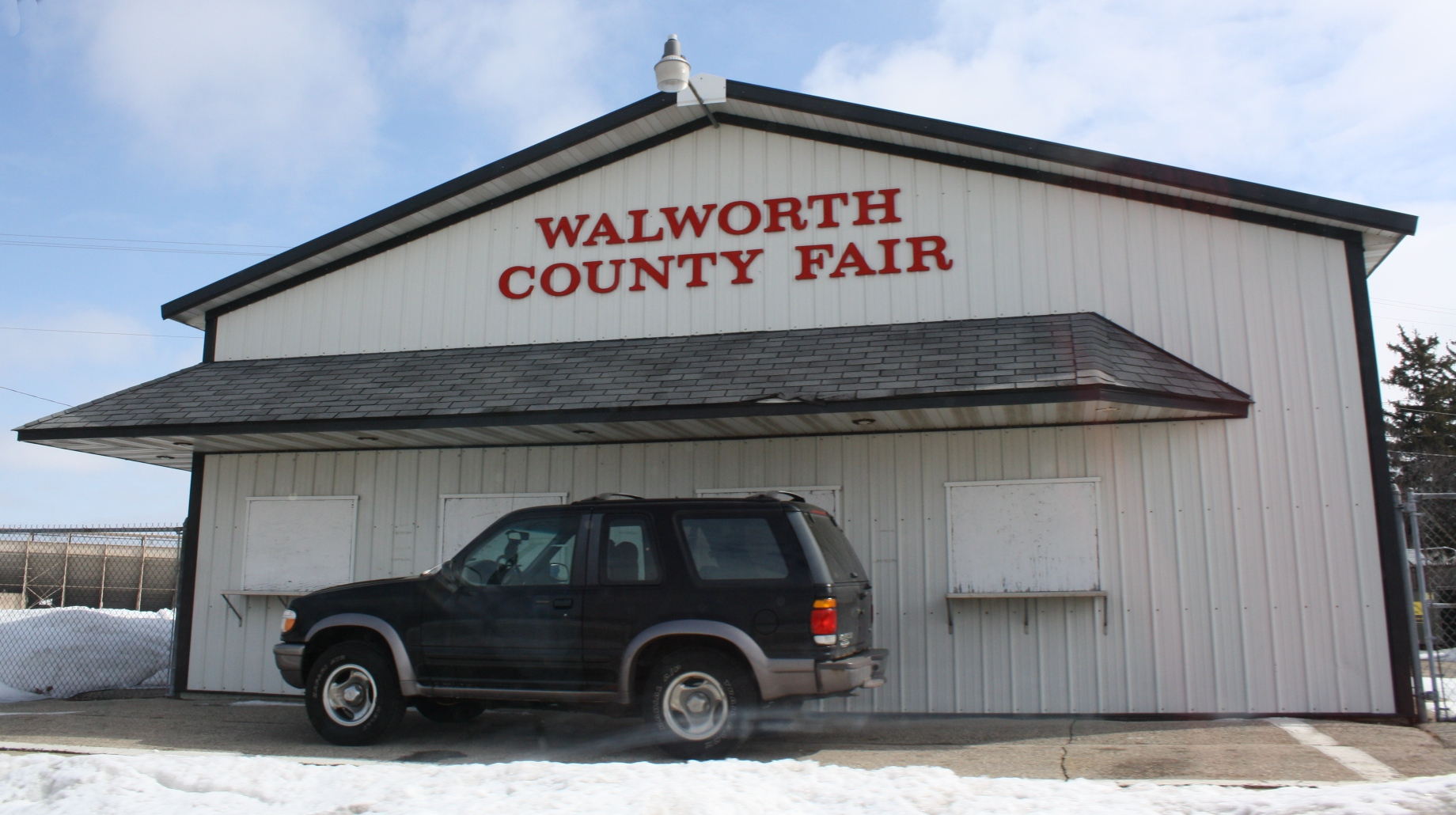
Building

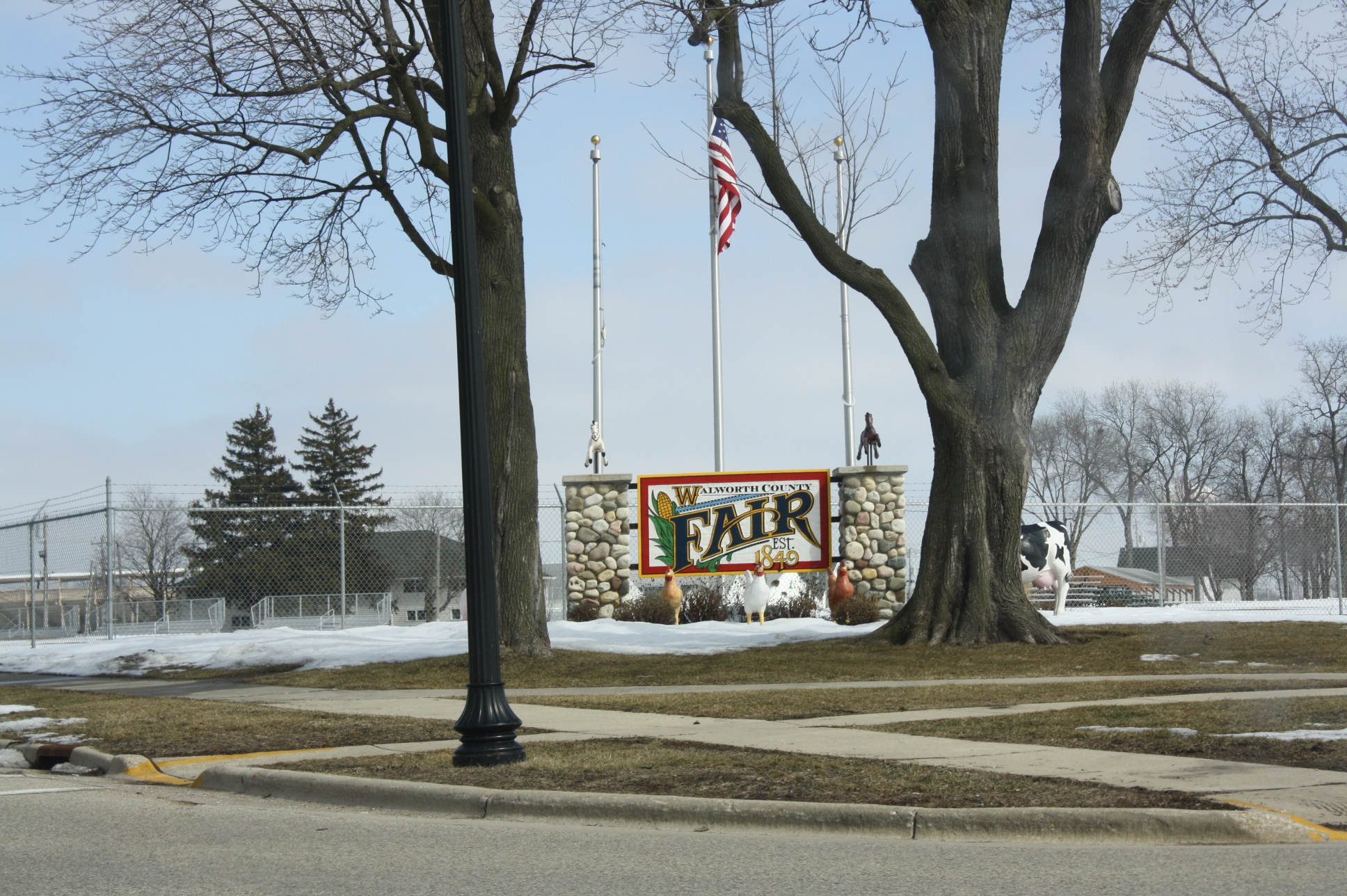
Sign

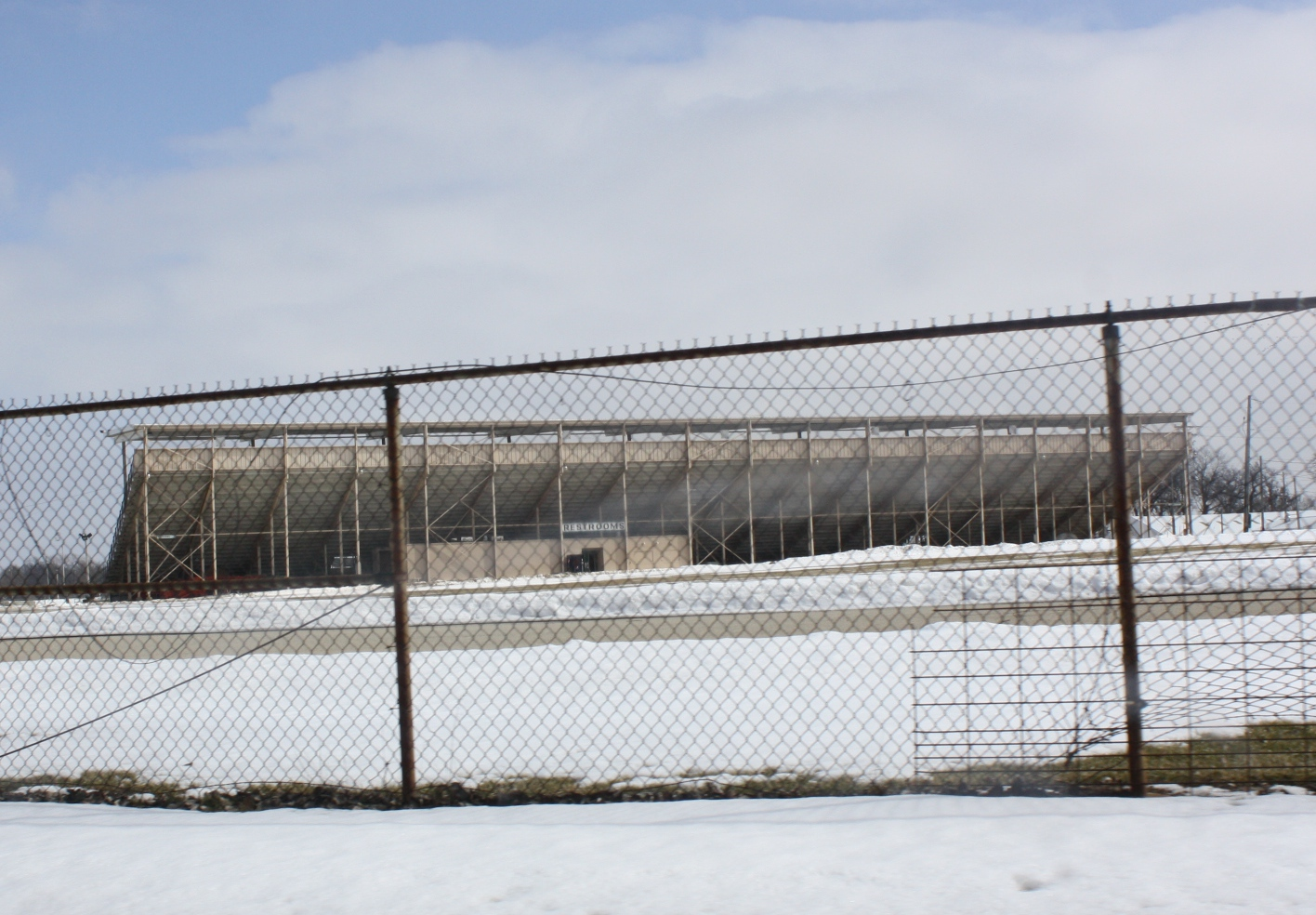
Grandstands
