= Tallan Noble Latz =

American blues rock musician (born 1999)

- Also known as: "The T-Man"
- Born: Tallan Noble Latz; September 22, 1999 (age 26); Elkhorn, Wisconsin, United States
- Genres: Blues, Rock, Pop
- Occupations: Musician; singer; guitarist
- Instrument(s): Guitar; Drums; Harmonica; Piano; Bass
- Years active: 2005-present
- Website: http://www.tallanlatz.com

Tallan Noble Latz (born September 22, 1999) is an American blues rock musician, who began performing professionally at age 6 and in the following 9 years, he has made recordings, appeared on multiple television shows and festivals and performed with many other blues and other music artists.

== Early life ==
Latz was born to parents Carl and Doris Latz of Elkhorn, Wisconsin, United States. He received his first musical instrument, a drum kit, at age three and began playing acoustic guitar at the age of four. By the time he was five, he watched a video of Joe Satriani had a major impact on the boy and he declared "That's what I want to do."

At seven he started his own band, "T-Man’s Blues Project"

== Career ==
When Latz was eight the band name changed to The Tallan Noble Latz Band. That year he played on-stage with performers such as Jackson Browne and Les Paul. He appeared on The Rachael Ray Show on January 21, 2009.

He did a cameo performance in the movie, Wildfire, the Arabian Horse.

In 2009, at nine, he collaborated with Louie Zagoras, recording five original songs: "Journey Man", "Slippin Away", "Other World", "Kid in the Region" and a song for Latz's mother called "4U". At ten he was voted WAMI's 2010 Rising Star Award Winner. At eleven he collaborated with blues artist, Anthony Gomes at Sawhorse Studios in St. Louis on two songs, "Blues Child" and "Blues @ 11". The songs relate to Latz's experiences as a young person on the road playing music in the adult world. Studio musicians Joe Meyer, Preston Hubbard and David Grelle joined them, allowing Latz to focus on guitar and vocal tracks. Jim Gaines mastered the songs. At twelve Latz became a guitar clinician and instructor. He partnered with Dangerous Guitars on instructional videos and books designed.

Latz has appeared on television, including America's Got Talent, Rachael Ray Show, WGN's Morning Show, Fox's Morning Show, Today Show with Kathy Lee and Hoda, Early Show, Studio B with Shepard Smith, Bonnie Hunt Show, CNN, Milwaukee’s Morning Blend, Today Show with Meredith Vieira, WLS TV Morning Show, Madison's Urban Theater and Almost Live with Johnny B.

Latz' YouTube channel has received over 25 million plays. While in Denmark on tour, Latz appeared on all three national TV networks within a one-week span.

Latz has performed at festivals including, Ain’t Nuttin But the Blues Fest, Summerfest, Lil Bear Ribfest, Northwest Ohio Rib-Off, Urbana Blues Brews and BBQ Festival, Ozark Blues Fest, Blues Bandits and BBQ Festival, TX State Fair, Bloomin Days, Blues Café, Oak Creek Lion's Fest, Great American Biker Rally, Round Lake Beach Fest, St. Fabien's Festival, The PRS Experience, Dallas Guitar Show, Bamfest, Prairie Dog Blues Fest, Lakefront Art Fest, Steel Bridge Songfest, IL Blues Fest, Harley's 105th Birthday Celebration, Paramount Blues Festival, WI State Fair, NAMM, Children of Fallen Riders Fest, Ruben's Run, Westmont Blues Fest (Muddy Water's Blues Fest), Northbrook Days, WI Harley Rally, WI/IL Border Rally, Sun Prairie Blues Fest, Jimi Hendrix's 67th Birthday Bash in Times Square and Co-Headlined The Stevie Ray Vaughan Ride and Concert in Dallas, Texas.

== Endorsements ==
Latz has endorsement deals with Ultimate Ears, PRS Guitars, StringDog, Buadier Guitars, Mojo Hand FX, Amalfitano Pickups, Ultrasone Headphones, Munder Pedals, Mogami Cables, In-Tune Guitar Picks, Curt Mangan Strings, Morley Pedals, Effects Pedal Boutique, Soulful Impressions, LR Baggs, Diamond Finish, Seymour Duncan Pickups, Graph Tech and Peterson Tuners. Latz is the youngest musician that any of these companies have ever endorsed.

Latz is working on multiple projects during 2013. He will be heading into the studio and then touring in support of the CD release with a nationwide and possible worldwide tour.

== Wisconsin club ban ==
In 2008, Latz's father Carl received a letter from the state of Wisconsin banning Latz from performing in club venues, given his young age. His booking agent received an anonymous letter threatening her with death should she continue booking him. As of 2014, he remained unable to perform in venues that served alcohol.

== Appearance on America's Got Talent ==
On July 14, 2009, Latz appeared as a contestant on America's Got Talent. He received a standing ovation from the audience, and all three judges approved of sending him to the next round. On July 29 he was eliminated at the start of the episode.
