= Oscar M. Fritz =

American judge, 14th Chief Justice of the Wisconsin Supreme Court

The Honorable Oscar M. Fritz
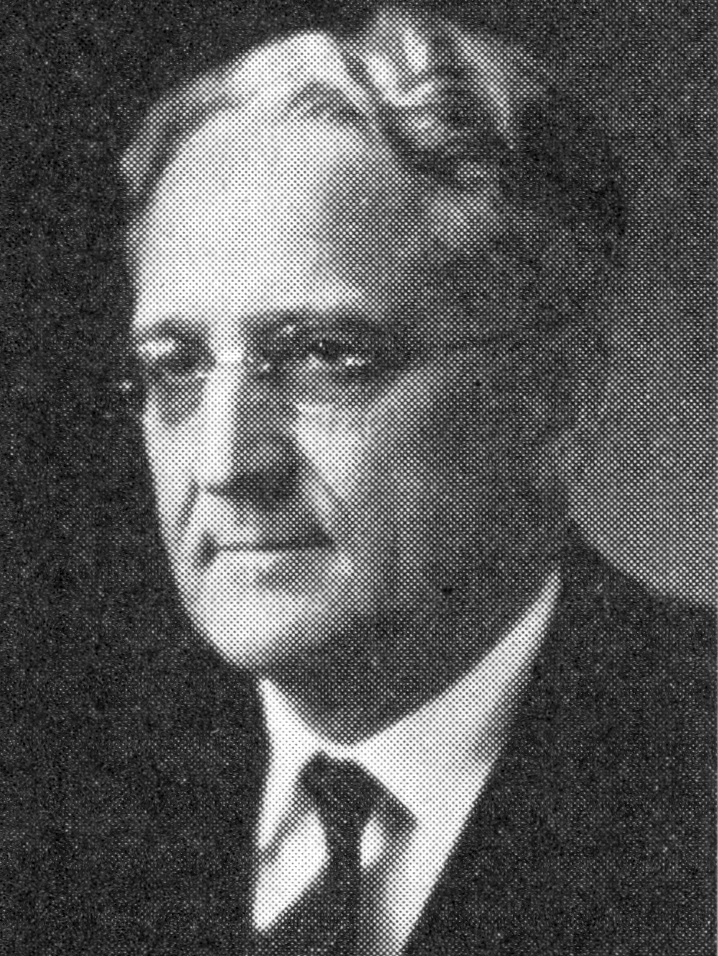
- Fritz circa 1940

14th Chief Justice of the Wisconsin Supreme Court
- In office January 1950 – January 1, 1954
- Preceded by: Marvin B. Rosenberry
- Succeeded by: Edward T. Fairchild

Justice of the Wisconsin Supreme Court
- In office May 28, 1929 – January 1, 1954
- Appointed by: Walter J. Kohler
- Preceded by: Christian Doerfler
- Succeeded by: Roland J. Steinle

Wisconsin Circuit Court Judge for the 2nd Circuit, Branch 2
- In office June 3, 1912 – May 28, 1929
- Appointed by: Francis E. McGovern
- Preceded by: Warren D. Tarrant
- Succeeded by: Daniel W. Sullivan

Personal details
- Born: Oscar Marion Fritz; March 3, 1878 Milwaukee, Wisconsin, U.S.
- Died: October 5, 1957 (aged 79) Milwaukee, Wisconsin, U.S.
- Cause of death: Stroke
- Resting place: Forest Home Cemetery, Milwaukee, Wisconsin
- Spouses: Ena B. Lorch (m. 1902; died 1945) Anna M. Millmann (m. 1947–1957)
- Children: Marion Theodore Fritz^{(b. 1908; died 1976)}; Norma Louise (Mortonson)^{(b. 1914; died 1982)}
- Parent: Theodore Fritz (father)
- Education: Milwaukee Law School; University of Wisconsin Law School
- Profession: lawyer, judge

Oscar Marion Fritz (March 3, 1878 – October 5, 1957) was an American lawyer and jurist from the U.S. state of Wisconsin. He was the 14th Chief Justice of the Wisconsin Supreme Court, serving a total of 25 years on the high court. Prior to that, he served 17 years as a Wisconsin circuit court judge in Milwaukee County.

== Biography ==
Born in Milwaukee, Wisconsin, to German American immigrants Theodore Fritz and Dora Fritz (née Glatz). During his childhood, his father served four years (1887–1891) in the Wisconsin State Senate, representing part of the city of Milwaukee as a member of the socialist Peoples' Party.

Fritz was educated in Milwaukee Public Schools and studied law through the Milwaukee Law School, a student-owned cooperative which provided night school law classes from volunteer instructors. He went on to attend the University of Wisconsin Law School in Madison, Wisconsin, where he graduated in 1901.

From 1901 through 1912, Fritz practiced law in Milwaukee in partnership with Theodore Kronshage, Francis E. McGovern, Guy D. Goff, Walter D. Corrigan, and Timothy J. Hannan. In June 1912, Fritz was appointed Wisconsin circuit court judge by his former law partner, Governor Francis McGovern, to fill the vacancy caused by the death of Judge Warren D. Tarrant. He retained the seat in a special election held the following spring, and he was elected to a full term in 1917. He was subsequently re-elected in 1923 and in 1929.

In May 1929, just after his circuit court re-election, Judge Fritz was appointed to the Wisconsin Supreme Court by Governor Walter J. Kohler. He was elected to a full term in 1934, and was subsequently re-elected in 1944. In 1950, with the retirement of Chief Justice Marvin B. Rosenberry, he became the most-senior serving member of the high court, and thus became the 14th chief justice. In 1953, Justice Fritz announced he would not run for another term in 1954. Later that year, he announced he would resign effective January 1, 1954, with a full year left before the end of his term.

Judge Fritz was hospitalized in Milwaukee after a stroke and died there on October 5, 1957.

== Personal life and family ==
Oscar Fritz married Ena B. Lorch in 1902. They had two children together, Marion (Mar) Theodore and Norma Louise. Ena died in 1945, and, two years later, Judge Fritz married Anna Marie Millmann of Milwaukee, who was then a member of the board of directors of the Marquette University Alumni Association.

He was survived by his second wife and by both children from his first marriage. He was cremated and interred alongside his first wife at Milwaukee's historic Forest Home Cemetery.

Legal offices
Preceded by Warren D. Tarrant	Wisconsin Circuit Court Judge for the 2nd Circuit, Branch 2 June 3, 1912 – May 28, 1929	Succeeded by Daniel W. Sullivan
Preceded by Christian Doerfler	Justice of the Wisconsin Supreme Court; May 28, 1929 – January 1, 1954	Succeeded by Roland J. Steinle
Preceded by Marvin B. Rosenberry	Chief Justice of the Wisconsin Supreme Court; January 1950 – January 1, 1954	Succeeded by Edward T. Fairchild
