= The Daily News (San Francisco) =

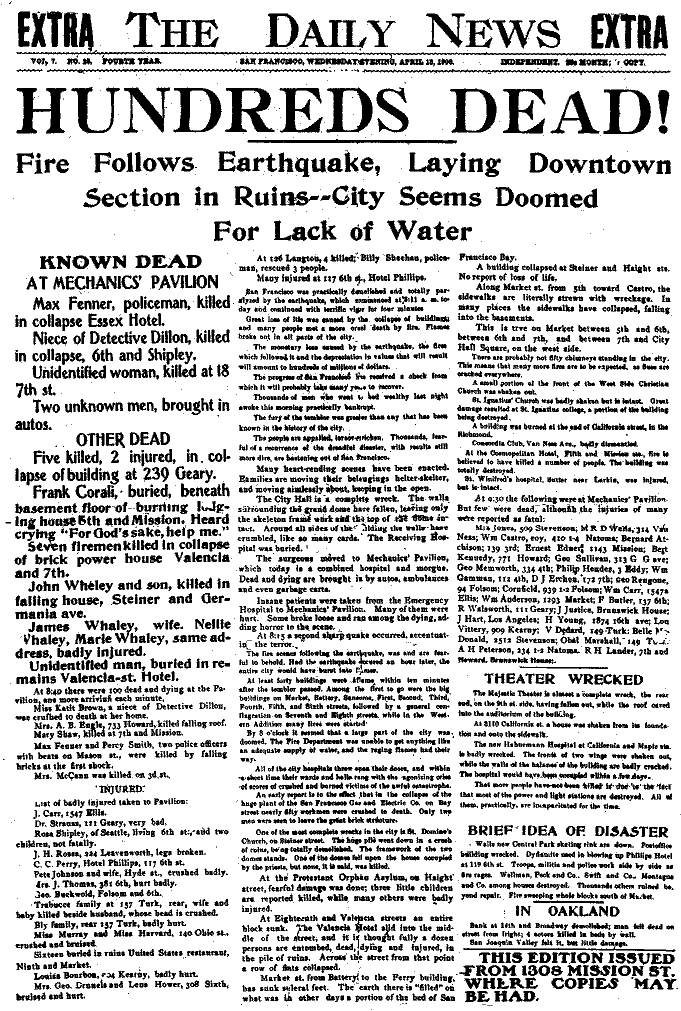
- The Daily News front page, April 18, 1906
- Type: Daily newspaper
- Owner: after 1922: E. W. Scripps Company
- Publisher: Eugene MacLean (c. 1917-1922)
- Editor: Gene Cohen (c. 1917-1922)
- Founded: 1903
- Ceased publication: 1959
- Headquarters: San Francisco, California
- Circulation: 18,000 as of 1919
- Price: 4 cents

The Daily News, later titled The San Francisco News, was a newspaper published in San Francisco, California. It was founded in 1903 by E. W. Scripps as a four-page penny paper. In its early years, it was the smallest of the several newspapers in San Francisco. It advertised itself as the "friend of the working man." It was distributed only in working class districts: Mission District, Skid Row, South of the Slot. It specialized in short, easy-to-read stories one to two paragraphs long. After the 1906 earthquake, it operated out of a former 720 sq ft (67 m^{2}) "relief house". Later special effects and stop-motion animation pioneer Willis H. O'Brien was a sports cartoonist for the paper in the 1910s. In 1919 the newspaper had a circulation of about 18,000. It changed its name to The San Francisco News in 1927, and in August 1959 merged with Hearst's The Call Bulletin to form the San Francisco News-Call Bulletin.
