= J. Henry Bennett =

American politician

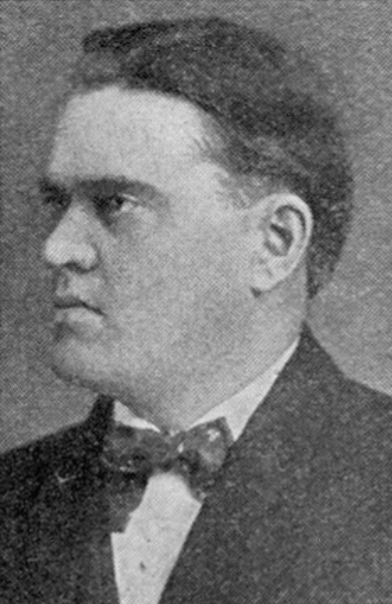
- Born: November 18, 1876; Vernon County, Wisconsin, US
- Died: April 29, 1956 (aged 79); Viroqua, Wisconsin, US
- Occupation: Lawyer
- Political party: Republican

J. Henry Bennett (1876–1956) was a member of the Wisconsin State Senate.

== Biography ==
Bennett was born in Vernon County, Wisconsin on November 18, 1876, and died in Viroqua, Wisconsin on April 29, 1956. He was buried in Viroqua.

== Career ==
Bennett was first elected to the Senate in 1914. Additionally, he was District Attorney of Vernon County, Wisconsin. He was a Republican.

Bennett was an unsuccessful candidate for the Wisconsin Supreme Court in 1949.
