= Peter F. Leuch =

American politician (1883–1959)

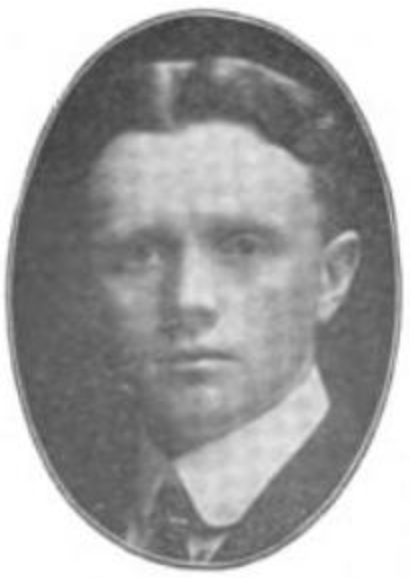
- oficial portait, circa 1909

Member of the Wisconsin State Assembly
- In office 1908–1910
- Constituency: Milwaukee County Fifteenth District

Personal details
- Born: December 1, 1883 Town of Milwaukee, Wisconsin
- Died: August 12, 1959 (aged 75) Port Washington, Wisconsin
- Party: Republican
- Other political affiliations: Progressive
- Education: Marquette College; Milwaukee Law School
- Occupation: Lawyer, politician

Leuch, circa 1949

Peter F. Leuch (December 1, 1883 – August 12, 1959) was an American lawyer from Milwaukee who served as that city's city clerk, and served one term as a Republican member of the Wisconsin State Assembly.

Leuch was born in the town of Milwaukee. Leuch attended Milwaukee public schools, studied at McDonald Business College and Chicago Correspondence School of Law. He then graduated from Marquette College and Milwaukee Law School and was admitted to the Wisconsin bar in January 1908. He worked for the Joseph Schlitz Brewing Company in the office. He was elected to the Assembly in 1908 on the Republican ticket, and was defeated for re-election in 1910 by Social Democrat Edward H. Kiefer. He was later elected City Clerk of the city of Milwaukee, and held that office in 1915. Leuch was involved with the Wisconsin Progressive Party and was the Milwaukee County campaign manager for United States Senator Robert M. La Follette, Sr. In 1924, Leuch was defeated for the Wisconsin and Assembly and in 1926, was defeated for Congress. In 1936, Leuch left the Wisconsin Progressive Party and returned to the Republican Party. He was a candidate for Wisconsin Supreme Court in 1944, 1945, and 1949. He was also president of the Leuch Reality and Investment Company and later lived in Cedarburg, Wisconsin. On August 12, 1959, Leuch died of a heart ailment in St. Alphonsus Hospital in Port Washington, Wisconsin.
