= Edward J. Gehl =

American judge. Justice of the Wisconsin Supreme Court

The Honorable Edward J. Gehl
- Gehl, circa 1922

Justice of the Wisconsin Supreme Court
- In office January 1, 1950 – August 28, 1956
- Preceded by: Marvin B. Rosenberry
- Succeeded by: Emmert L. Wingert

Personal details
- Born: Edward John Gehl; January 26, 1890 Hartford, Wisconsin
- Died: August 28, 1956 (aged 66) Wisconsin
- Spouse: Jessica Colburn
- Children: 1
- Education: University of Wisconsin Law School
- Profession: lawyer, judge

advertisement for Gehl's 1922 campaign in the Republican primary for the U.S. House

Edward John Gehl (January 26, 1890 – August 28, 1956) was an American jurist from Wisconsin.

Born in Hartford, Wisconsin, Gehl graduated from the University of Wisconsin Law School in 1913. During World War I, he served in the United States Army and was awarded the Purple Heart and Silver Star. Gehl was in private practice in Hartford and then was elected a Wisconsin Circuit Court judge. In 1949, Gehl was elected to the Wisconsin Supreme Court serving until his death. He died at a hospital in Madison, Wisconsin, following surgery.
