= 1944 Wisconsin Supreme Court election =

- April 3, 1944
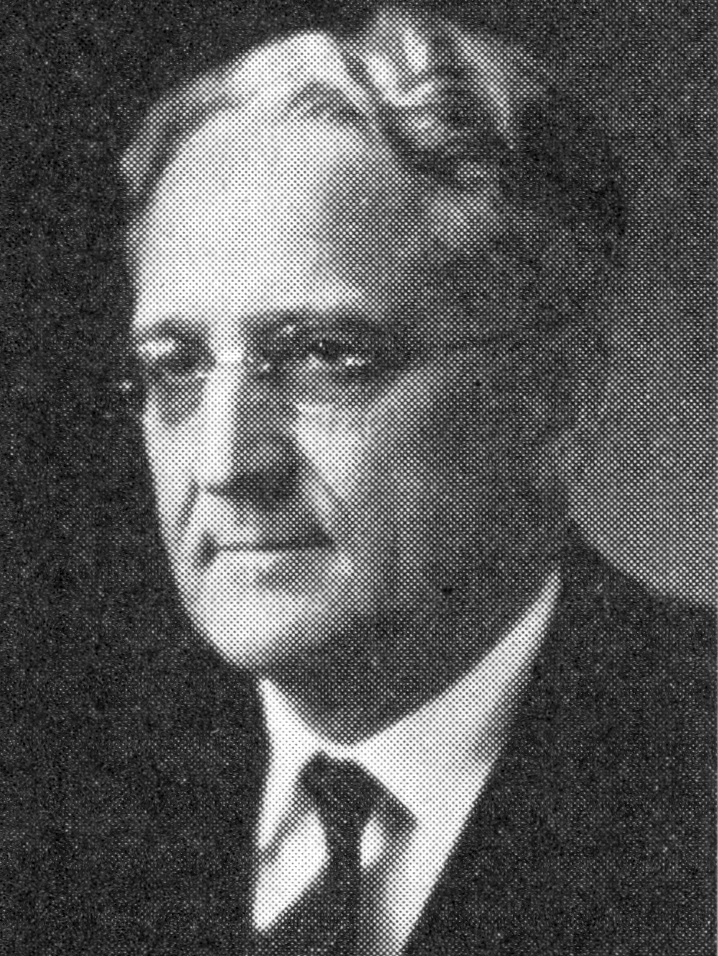

Candidate	Oscar M. Fritz	Peter F. Leuch
Popular vote	359,916	153,937
Percentage	70.04%	29.96%
Justice before election
Oscar M. Fritz
Elected Justice
Oscar M. Fritz

The 1944 Wisconsin Supreme Court election was held April 3, 1944. Incumbent justice Oscar M. Fritz was handily re-elected over Peter F. Leuch.

== Candidates ==
- Oscar M. Fritz, incumbent justice
- Peter F. Leuch, lawyer, former member of the Wisconsin Assembly, former Milwaukee city clerk

== Results ==
1944 Wisconsin Supreme Court election
Party	Candidate	Votes	%
General election (April 4, 1944)
Nonpartisan	Oscar M. Fritz (incumbent)	359,916	70.04
Nonpartisan	Peter F. Leuch	153,937	29.96
Total votes		513,853	100
