= Herman Ekern =

American attorney and politician (1872–1954)

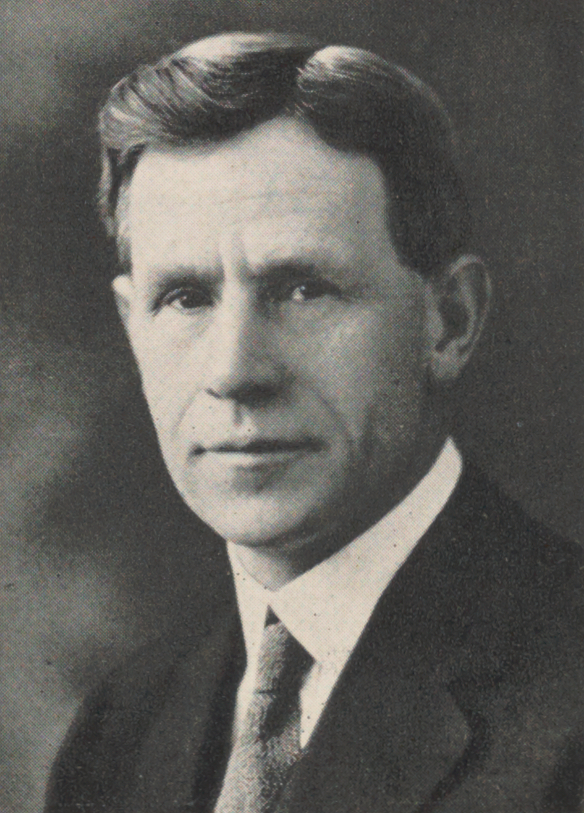
- Ekern c. 1925

28th Lieutenant Governor of Wisconsin
- In office May 16, 1938 – January 2, 1939
- Governor: Philip La Follette
- Preceded by: Henry Gunderson
- Succeeded by: Walter Samuel Goodland

25th Attorney General of Wisconsin
- In office January 1, 1923 – January 3, 1927
- Governor: John J. Blaine
- Preceded by: William J. Morgan
- Succeeded by: John W. Reynolds Sr.

8th Commissioner of Insurance of Wisconsin
- In office January 2, 1911 – June 30, 1915
- Governor: Francis E. McGovern; Emanuel L. Philipp
- Preceded by: George E. Beedle
- Succeeded by: M. J. Cleary

42nd Speaker of the Wisconsin State Assembly
- In office January 9, 1905 – January 4, 1909
- Preceded by: Irvine Lenroot
- Succeeded by: Levi H. Bancroft

Member of the Wisconsin State Assembly from the Trempealeau County district
- In office January 5, 1903 – January 4, 1909
- Preceded by: Eugene Clark
- Succeeded by: Albert Twesme

Personal details
- Born: Herman Lewis Ekern; December 27, 1872 Pigeon Falls, Wisconsin, U.S.
- Died: December 4, 1954 (aged 81) Dane, Wisconsin, U.S.
- Resting place: Forest Hill Cemetery, Madison, Wisconsin
- Party: Republican (before 1934); Wisconsin Progressive; National Progressives
- Spouse: Lily C. Anderson
- Children: Elsie Alvern (Fisher)^{(b. 1900; died 1998)}; Lila May (Ratcliff)^{(b. 1901; died 1990)}; John Harold Ekern^{(b. 1903; died 1998)}; George Lewis Ekern^{(b. 1905; died 1976)}; Irene Helen (Alexander)^{(b. 1907; died 2000)}; Dorothy Jane Ekern^{(b. 1914; died 2003)}
- Relatives: Peder Ekern (uncle)
- Education: University of Wisconsin Law School
- Known for: Co-founding Lutheran Brotherhood

Herman Lewis Ekern (December 27, 1872 – December 4, 1954) was an American attorney and progressive Republican politician who served as the 28th lieutenant governor of Wisconsin, the 25th attorney general of Wisconsin, and the 42nd speaker of the Wisconsin State Assembly. He was also one of the founders of Lutheran Brotherhood.

== Background ==
Herman Lewis Ekern was born in 1872 near Pigeon Falls, Wisconsin. He was the son of Even Ekern and Elizabeth (née Grimsrud) Ekern. He received a law degree from the University of Wisconsin Law School in 1894. Following his graduation, he practiced law at Whitehall, Wisconsin in co-partnership with H. A. Anderson under the firm name of Anderson & Ekern.

== Career ==
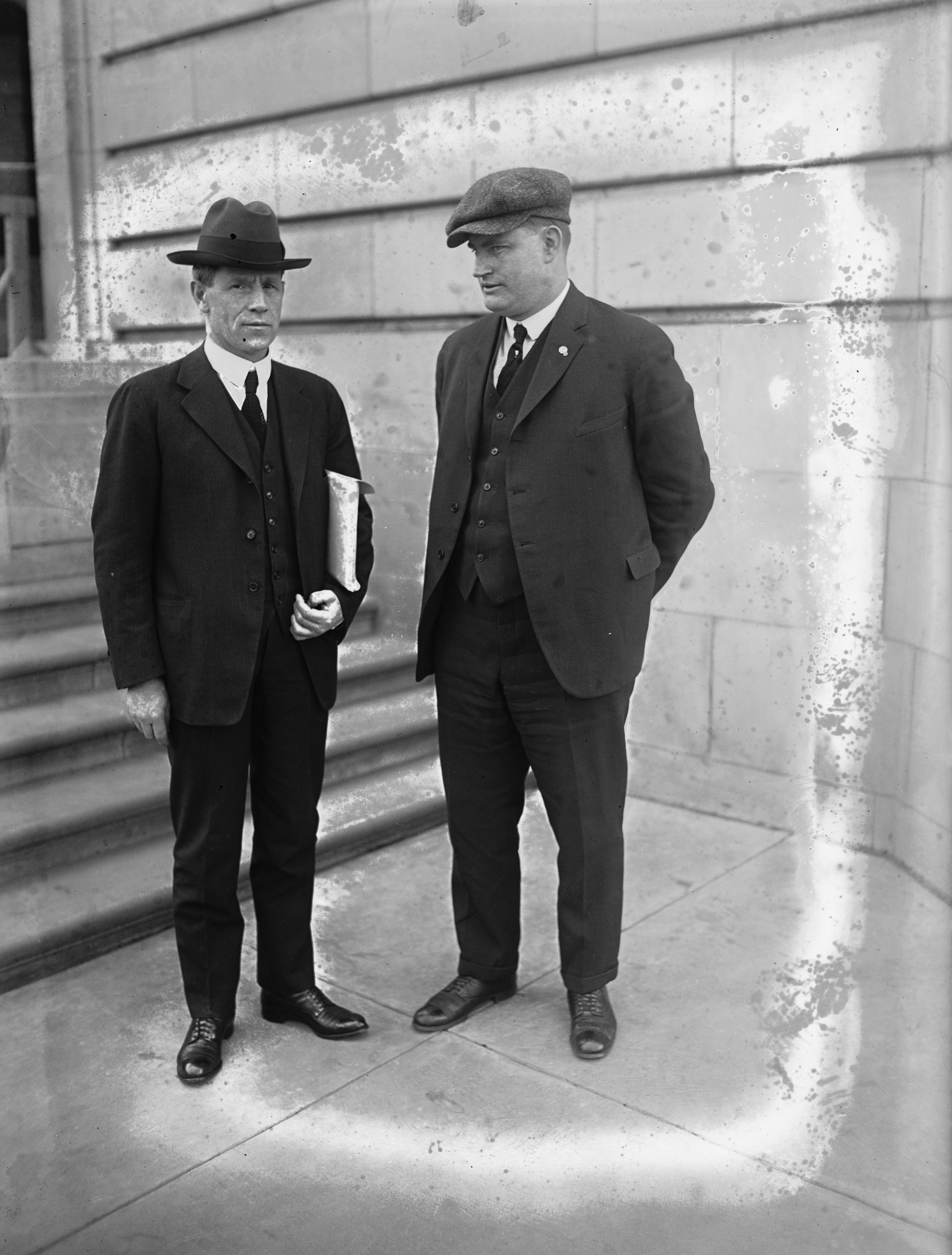
Ekern (left) in 1924

Five years later was elected district attorney of Trempealeau County. He served three terms in the Wisconsin State Assembly, from 1903 until 1907, and was the speaker of the Assembly in his final term. During his time in the Assembly, he was noted for helping design Wisconsin's life insurance code. From 1911 until 1915, he served as Wisconsin's insurance commissioner. Afterwards, he helped form a law partnership which specialized in insurance cases and helped write the Federal Soldiers' and Sailors' War Risk Insurance Act.

Lifelong Lutherans, Herman Ekern and J. A. O. Preus, Minnesota insurance commissioner and future Governor of Minnesota (1921–1925) had proposed launching a not-for-profit mutual aid society. The founding of Lutheran Brotherhood came as a result of the 1917 merger convention of the Norwegian Lutheran Church of America. In 1929, Herman Ekern became president in the organization which would grow in time to become Thrivent Financial for Lutherans.

Ekern later returned to his political career, serving as Wisconsin's Attorney General from 1923 until 1927. After Lieutenant Governor Henry Gunderson resigned in 1937, Governor Philip La Follette named Ekern Lieutenant Governor the following year. Ekern was among those on a platform during the formation of the National Progressives of America (NPA) in 1938, and subsequently became a member of the NPA. The appointment as Lieutenant Governor was challenged and upheld in State ex rel. Martin v. Ekern. After his term ended in 1939, Ekern served on the Board of Regents of the University of Wisconsin until 1943. Ekern later was in private law practice in Chicago and Madison.

In 1949, he received a Distinguished Alumni Award from the Alumni Association of the University of Wisconsin. Herman Ekern died in 1954. The papers of Herman Ekern are maintained within the archives of the Wisconsin Historical Society.

Party political offices
Preceded by William J. Morgan	Republican nominee for Attorney General of Wisconsin; 1922, 1924	Succeeded by John W. Reynolds Sr.
First	Progressive nominee for U.S. Senator from Wisconsin (Class 3); 1938	Succeeded by Harry Sauthoff
Wisconsin State Assembly
Preceded by Eugene Clark	Member of the Wisconsin State Assembly from the Trempealeau County district January 5, 1903 – January 4, 1909	Succeeded by Albert Twesme
Preceded by Irvine Lenroot	Speaker of the Wisconsin State Assembly; January 7, 1905 – January 4, 1909	Succeeded by Levi H. Bancroft
Legal offices
Preceded by William J. Morgan	Attorney General of Wisconsin; 1923–1927	Succeeded by John W. Reynolds Sr.
Government offices
Preceded by George E. Beedle	Commissioner of Insurance of Wisconsin; January 2, 1911 – June 30, 1915	Succeeded by M. J. Cleary
Political offices
Preceded by Henry Gunderson	Lieutenant Governor of Wisconsin; 1938–1939	Succeeded by Walter Samuel Goodland
