= Wisconsin Insurance Commissioner =

Wisconsin state agency charged with regulating insurance in the state

Office of the Commissioner of Insurance of Wisconsin

Agency overview
- Formed: April 1, 1878; 148 years ago
- Headquarters: Department of Administration Building 101 E. Wilson St. Madison, Wisconsin, U.S. 43°4′23.96″N 89°22′46.85″W
- Employees: 134.83 (2021)
- Annual budget: $361,907,100 (2021)
- Agency executives: Nathan Houdek, Commissioner; Rachel Cissne Carabell, Deputy Commissioner
- Website: oci.wi.gov

The Office of the Commissioner of Insurance of Wisconsin is an independent agency of the Wisconsin state government responsible for supervising and regulating the insurance industry in Wisconsin. The office licenses insurers operating in the state, examines their financial and business practices, investigates consumer complaints, ensures compliance with state laws and regulations, and provides information on the insurance industry to the public.

The Office is headquartered in the State Education Building, or GEF-3, in downtown Madison, Wisconsin.

== History ==
The insurance business was first authorized and regulated in Wisconsin in 1870 (1870 Wisc. Act 56). The original law vested insurance regulation as a power of the Secretary of State of Wisconsin. These powers were transferred to a separate commissioner of insurance by an act of the Wisconsin Legislature in 1878 (1878 Wisc. Act 214). The office was initially designed as a gubernatorial appointee, and the first insurance commissioner, Philip L. Spooner, Jr., was appointed by Governor William E. Smith. In 1881, however, a new act of the Legislature (1881 Wisc. Act 300) converted the appointed office into a state-wide elected office. This continued until 1911, when the office was converted back into a gubernatorial appointee.

== Organization ==
The senior leadership of the Office consists of the Commissioner and Deputy Commissioner, along with the administrators and directors of the internal divisions of the Office.

- Commissioner: Nathan Houdek
- Deputy Commissioner: Rebecca Easland
- Administrator of Financial Regulation: Amy Malm
- Administrator of Market Regulation & Enforcement: Rebecca Rebholz
- Director of Operational Management: Lilian Kahite
- Director of Public Affairs: Sarah Smith
- Director of the Office of Administrative Services: Kristina Thole
- Chief Legal Counsel: Lauren Van Buren

=== Subordinate boards ===
Separate from the ordinary organizational structure of the Office, there are a number of commissions and boards created by acts of the Wisconsin Legislature to oversee, advise, or administer certain funds.

- Board of Directors of the Insurance Security Fund
- Board of Governors of the Injured Patients and Families Compensation Fund / Wisconsin Health Care Liability Insurance Plan
- Injured Patients and Families Compensation Fund Peer Review Council

== Commissioners ==
Order	Commissioner	Took office	Left office	Notes
1	Philip L. Spooner Jr.	April 1, 1878	January 3, 1887	Appointed by William E. Smith, then elected in 1881 and 1884.
2	Philip Cheek Jr.	January 3, 1887	January 5, 1891	Elected in 1886 and 1888.
3	Wilbur M. Root	January 5, 1891	January 7, 1895	Elected in 1890 and 1892.
4	William A. Fricke	January 7, 1895	January 2, 1899	Elected in 1894 and 1896.
5	Emil Giljohann	January 2, 1899	January 5, 1903	Elected in 1898 and 1900.
6	Zeno M. Host	January 5, 1903	January 7, 1907	Elected in 1902 and 1904.
7	George E. Beedle	January 7, 1907	January 2, 1911	Elected in 1906 and 1908.
8	Herman Ekern	January 2, 1911	June 30, 1915	Elected in 1910. The law changed in 1911, turning the office into an appointed position. Governor Francis E. McGovern attempted to remove him in 1913, but he successfully sued the governor to remain in office.
	Lewis A. Anderson	January 15, 1913	January 30, 1913	Appointed by Francis E. McGovern, but appointment was enjoined by the court, then vetoed by the Wisconsin Senate.
9	M. J. Cleary	June 30, 1915	April 10, 1919	Appointed by Emanuel L. Philipp. Resigned.
10	Platt Whitman	April 16, 1919	June 30, 1923	Appointed by Emanuel L. Philipp.
11	W. Stanley Smith	June 30, 1923	June 1, 1926	Appointed by John J. Blaine. Resigned.
12	Oswald H. Johnson	June 2, 1926	January 7, 1927	Appointed by John J. Blaine. Resigned.
13	Milton A. Freedy	January 11, 1927	June 30, 1931	Appointed by Fred R. Zimmerman.
14	H. J. Mortensen	June 30, 1931	June 30, 1939	Appointed by Philip La Follette.
15	Morvin Duel	September 20, 1939	August 18, 1948	Appointed by Julius P. Heil. Re-appointed by Walter Samuel Goodland (1943) and Oscar Rennebohm (1947). Died in office.
16	John R. Lange	November 27, 1948	June 1, 1955	Appointed by Oscar Rennebohm.
17	Alfred Van De Zande	June 1, 1955	November 1, 1955	Appointed by Walter J. Kohler Jr.
18	Paul J. Rogan	November 1, 1955	June 1, 1959	Appointed by Walter J. Kohler Jr.
19	Charles L. Manson	June 1, 1959	September 15, 1965	Appointed by Gaylord Nelson. Re-appointed by John W. Reynolds Jr. (1963). Reached mandatory retirement age.
20	Robert Haase	September 15, 1965	September 7, 1969	Appointed by Warren P. Knowles. Resigned.
21	Stanley C. Du Rose Jr.	October 1, 1969	April 9, 1975	Appointed by Warren P. Knowles.
22	Harold R. Wilde	April 9, 1975	April 16, 1979	Appointed by Patrick Lucey.
23	Susan Mitchell	April 16, 1979	August 1, 1982	Appointed by Lee S. Dreyfus.
24	Ann Haney	August 1, 1982	March 1, 1983	Appointed by Lee S. Dreyfus.
25	Thomas P. Fox	March 1, 1983	April 24, 1987	Appointed by Tony Earl. Resigned.
26	Robert Haase	April 24, 1987	December 16, 1992	Appointed by Tommy Thompson. Resigned.
	John Torgerson	December 16, 1992	March 8, 1993	Acting commissioner.
27	Josephine Musser	March 8, 1993	January 2, 1998	Appointed by Tommy Thompson.
	Randy Blumer	January 2, 1998	January 4, 1999	Acting commissioner.
28	Connie L. O'Connell	January 4, 1999	February 5, 2003	Appointed by Tommy Thompson.
29	Jorge Gomez	February 5, 2003	January 1, 2007	Appointed by Jim Doyle.
30	Sean Dilweg	January 1, 2007	January 3, 2011	Appointed by Jim Doyle.
31	Ted Nickel	January 3, 2011	January 7, 2019	Appointed by Scott Walker.
32	Mark Afable	January 7, 2019	December 31, 2021	Appointed by Tony Evers.
33	Nathan Houdek	January 1, 2022	Current	Appointed by Tony Evers.
