= 1924 Wisconsin gubernatorial election =

- November 4, 1924
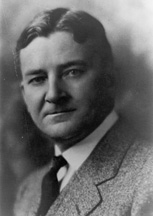

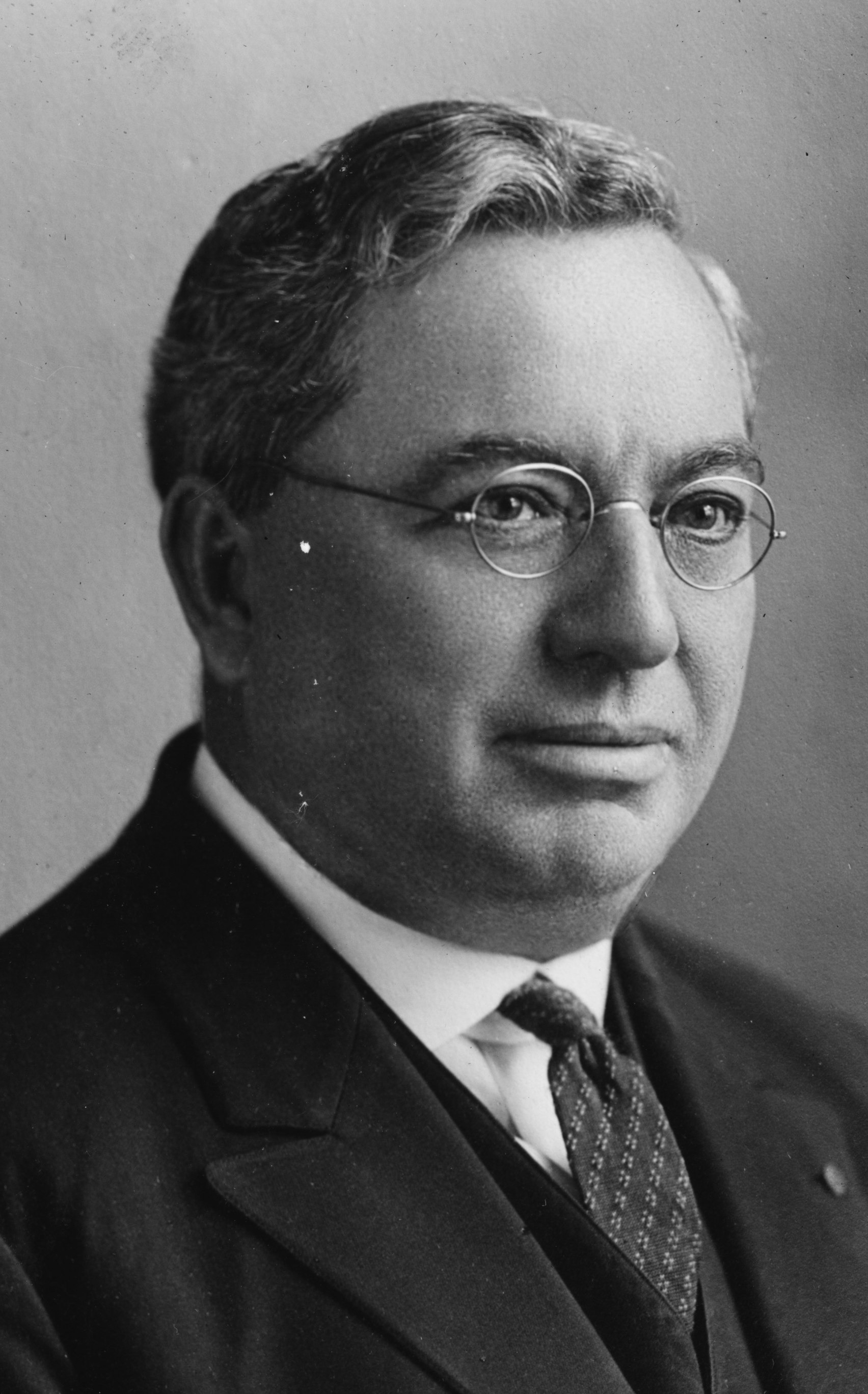

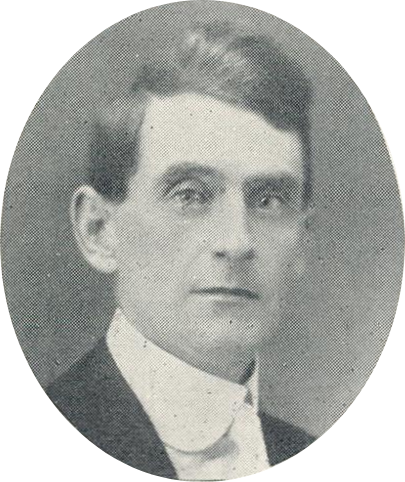
Nominee	John J. Blaine	Martin L. Lueck	William F. Quick
Party	Republican	Democratic	Social-Democratic
Popular vote	412,255	317,550	45,268
Percentage	51.76%	39.87%	5.68%
- County results Blaine: 30–40% 40–50% 50–60% 60–70% 70–80% 80–90% Lueck: 40–50% 50–60% 60–70%
Governor before election
John J. Blaine
Republican
Elected Governor
John J. Blaine
Republican

The 1924 Wisconsin gubernatorial election was held on November 4, 1924. Primary elections were held on September 2, 1924.

Incumbent Republican Governor John J. Blaine won re-election to a third term, defeating Democratic nominee Martin L. Lueck and Social-Democratic nominee William F. Quick.

As of 2022, this is the most recent instance of Walworth County voting Democratic in a gubernatorial election.

== Primary election ==
=== Republican party ===
==== Candidates ====
- John J. Blaine, incumbent Governor
- George Comings, incumbent Lieutenant Governor
- Arthur R. Hirst, former state highway engineer

==== Results ====
Republican primary results
Party	Candidate	Votes	%
Republican	John J. Blaine (incumbent)	230,985	54.38%
Republican	Arthur R. Hirst	157,138	36.99%
Republican	George Comings	36,666	8.63%
Total votes		424,789	100.00%

=== Democratic party ===
==== Candidates ====
- Martin L. Lueck, former circuit court judge

==== Results ====
Democratic primary results
Party	Candidate	Votes	%
Democratic	Martin L. Lueck	21,347	100.00%
Total votes		21,347	100.00%

=== Social-Democratic party ===
==== Candidates ====
- William F. Quick, State Senator

==== Results ====
Social-Democratic primary results
Party	Candidate	Votes	%
Social-Democratic	William F. Quick	18,401	100.00%
Total votes		18,401	100.00%

=== Prohibition party ===
==== Candidates ====
- Adolph R. Bucknam, Prohibition nominee for U.S. Senate in 1922

==== Results ====
Prohibition primary results
Party	Candidate	Votes	%
Prohibition	Adolph R. Bucknam	1,484	100.00%
Total votes		1,484	100.00%

=== Other party nominations ===
- Severi Alanne, Workers, director of the Co-operative Central Exchange (CCE) of Superior, Wisconsin
- Farrand K. Shuttleworth, Independent Progressive Republican (Independent), attorney
- Jose Snover, Socialist Labor

== General election ==
=== Results ===
1924 Wisconsin gubernatorial election
Party	Candidate	Votes	%	±%
Republican	John J. Blaine (incumbent)	412,255	51.76%	−24.60%
Democratic	Martin L. Lueck	317,550	39.87%	+29.27%
Social-Democratic	William F. Quick	45,268	5.68%	−2.53%
Prohibition	Adolph R. Bucknam	11,516	1.45%	−3.00%
Workers (Note: "Independent Workers Party of America")	Severi Alanne	4,107	0.52%	
Progressive (Note: "Independent Progressive Republican")	Farrand K. Shuttleworth	4,079	0.51%	
Socialist Labor (Note: "Independent Socialist Labor")	Jose Snover	1,452	0.18%	−0.12%
	Scattering	205	0.03%	
Majority		94,705	11.89%	
Total votes		796,432	100.00%	
Republican hold		Swing	-53.87%	

=== Results by county ===
Lueck was the first Democrat since William A. Barstow in 1853 to win Columbia County and the first since James B. Cross in 1857 to win Richland County; the latter would not vote Democratic again until 2002.

County	John J. Blaine Republican		Martin L. Lueck Democratic		William F. Quick Social-Democratic		Adolph R. Bucknam Prohibition		All Others Various		Margin		Total votes cast
County	#	%	#	%	#	%	#	%	#	%	#	%	Total votes cast
Adams	1,628	68.06%	676	28.26%	21	0.88%	43	1.80%	24	1.00%	952	39.80%	2,392
Ashland	4,307	66.87%	1,906	29.59%	65	1.01%	86	1.34%	77	1.20%	2,401	37.28%	6,441
Barron	5,729	68.89%	1,995	23.99%	93	1.12%	350	4.21%	149	1.79%	3,734	44.90%	8,316
Bayfield	2,987	70.97%	894	21.24%	80	1.90%	119	2.83%	129	3.06%	2,093	49.73%	4,209
Brown	9,662	52.57%	8,248	44.88%	178	0.97%	164	0.89%	127	0.69%	1,414	7.69%	18,379
Buffalo	2,731	73.34%	790	21.21%	78	2.09%	64	1.72%	61	1.64%	1,941	52.12%	3,724
Burnett	2,331	81.90%	328	11.52%	33	1.16%	90	3.16%	64	2.25%	2,003	70.38%	2,846
Calumet	3,029	64.60%	1,521	32.44%	55	1.17%	50	1.07%	34	0.73%	1,508	32.16%	4,689
Chippewa	6,600	56.10%	4,797	40.77%	48	0.41%	140	1.19%	180	1.53%	1,803	15.33%	11,765
Clark	5,856	65.00%	2,597	28.83%	123	1.37%	205	2.28%	228	2.53%	3,259	36.17%	9,009
Columbia	4,389	40.57%	6,104	56.42%	76	0.70%	132	1.22%	117	1.08%	-1,715	-15.85%	10,818
Crawford	2,793	52.05%	2,357	43.92%	41	0.76%	131	2.44%	44	0.82%	436	8.13%	5,366
Dane	21,890	57.84%	14,435	38.14%	233	0.62%	620	1.64%	666	1.76%	7,455	19.70%	37,844
Dodge	8,390	49.96%	7,781	46.33%	378	2.25%	135	0.80%	109	0.65%	609	3.63%	16,793
Door	2,936	67.76%	1,167	26.93%	28	0.65%	121	2.79%	81	1.87%	1,769	40.83%	4,333
Douglas	9,178	67.48%	3,812	28.03%	77	0.57%	243	1.79%	292	2.15%	5,366	39.45%	13,602
Dunn	4,540	63.67%	2,226	31.22%	41	0.58%	129	1.81%	194	2.72%	2,314	32.45%	7,130
Eau Claire	5,777	54.14%	4,565	42.78%	49	0.46%	179	1.68%	101	0.95%	1,212	11.36%	10,671
Florence	823	72.64%	244	21.54%	22	1.94%	15	1.32%	29	2.56%	579	51.10%	1,133
Fond du Lac	9,815	49.74%	9,378	47.53%	126	0.64%	177	0.90%	235	1.19%	437	2.21%	19,731
Forest	1,353	55.66%	957	39.37%	31	1.28%	49	2.02%	41	1.69%	396	16.29%	2,431
Grant	6,498	49.95%	5,639	43.34%	71	0.55%	536	4.12%	266	2.04%	859	6.60%	13,010
Green	4,306	55.49%	3,085	39.76%	64	0.82%	216	2.78%	89	1.15%	1,221	15.73%	7,760
Green Lake	1,998	40.18%	2,847	57.25%	41	0.82%	69	1.39%	18	0.36%	-849	-17.07%	4,973
Iowa	3,600	47.64%	3,494	46.24%	48	0.64%	282	3.73%	133	1.76%	106	1.40%	7,557
Iron	1,867	79.82%	322	13.77%	28	1.20%	29	1.24%	93	3.98%	1,545	66.05%	2,339
Jackson	3,445	70.51%	1,272	26.03%	28	0.57%	81	1.66%	60	1.23%	2,173	44.47%	4,886
Jefferson	5,961	46.32%	6,602	51.30%	71	0.55%	111	0.86%	125	0.97%	-641	-4.98%	12,870
Juneau	3,410	61.51%	1,827	32.95%	87	1.57%	131	2.36%	89	1.61%	1,583	28.55%	5,544
Kenosha	6,697	36.74%	11,136	61.09%	201	1.10%	117	0.64%	77	0.42%	-4,439	-24.35%	18,228
Kewaunee	2,439	66.39%	1,150	31.30%	14	0.38%	28	0.76%	43	1.17%	1,289	35.08%	3,674
La Crosse	9,871	60.24%	6,128	37.40%	73	0.45%	225	1.37%	90	0.55%	3,743	22.84%	16,387
Lafayette	3,606	49.50%	3,390	46.53%	18	0.25%	225	3.09%	46	0.63%	216	2.96%	7,285
Langlade	3,424	49.85%	3,177	46.26%	48	0.70%	184	2.68%	35	0.51%	247	3.60%	6,868
Lincoln	3,789	60.90%	2,178	35.00%	42	0.68%	114	1.83%	99	1.59%	1,611	25.89%	6,222
Manitowoc	9,427	61.64%	5,521	36.10%	182	1.19%	82	0.54%	82	0.54%	3,906	25.54%	15,294
Marathon	11,179	63.24%	5,533	31.30%	381	2.16%	214	1.21%	369	2.09%	5,646	31.94%	17,676
Marinette	5,043	58.44%	3,058	35.43%	169	1.96%	218	2.53%	142	1.65%	1,985	23.00%	8,630
Marquette	1,486	44.21%	1,805	53.70%	11	0.33%	41	1.22%	18	0.54%	-319	-9.49%	3,361
Milwaukee	56,268	37.78%	53,312	35.80%	37,603	25.25%	462	0.31%	1,291	0.87%	2,956	1.98%	148,936
Monroe	5,650	63.78%	2,810	31.72%	102	1.15%	193	2.18%	103	1.16%	2,840	32.06%	8,858
Oconto	4,611	64.47%	2,337	32.68%	48	0.67%	83	1.16%	73	1.02%	2,274	31.80%	7,152
Oneida	2,619	54.19%	1,955	40.45%	99	2.05%	70	1.45%	90	1.86%	664	13.74%	4,833
Outagamie	9,940	59.94%	6,097	36.77%	122	0.74%	219	1.32%	205	1.24%	3,843	23.17%	16,583
Ozaukee	2,192	45.13%	2,473	50.92%	103	2.12%	10	0.21%	79	1.63%	-281	-5.79%	4,857
Pepin	929	43.88%	1,045	49.36%	50	2.36%	64	3.02%	29	1.37%	-116	-5.48%	2,117
Pierce	4,143	69.47%	1,378	23.11%	78	1.31%	256	4.29%	109	1.83%	2,765	46.36%	5,964
Polk	4,779	73.05%	1,310	20.02%	68	1.04%	221	3.38%	164	2.51%	3,469	53.03%	6,542
Portage	4,242	44.55%	5,096	53.52%	41	0.43%	101	1.06%	42	0.44%	-854	-8.97%	9,522
Price	3,253	68.48%	1,135	23.89%	43	0.91%	114	2.40%	205	4.32%	2,118	44.59%	4,750
Racine	11,260	45.68%	12,494	50.69%	362	1.47%	256	1.04%	278	1.13%	-1,234	-5.01%	24,650
Richland	2,343	40.80%	2,977	51.84%	37	0.64%	309	5.38%	77	1.34%	-634	-11.04%	5,743
Rock	9,579	41.69%	12,665	55.13%	114	0.50%	446	1.94%	171	0.74%	-3,086	-13.43%	22,975
Rusk	2,391	55.70%	1,593	37.11%	69	1.61%	142	3.31%	98	2.28%	798	18.59%	4,293
Sauk	5,584	54.87%	4,136	40.64%	71	0.70%	259	2.55%	126	1.24%	1,448	14.23%	10,176
Sawyer	1,529	63.05%	730	30.10%	50	2.06%	66	2.72%	50	2.06%	799	32.95%	2,425
Shawano	6,443	76.34%	1,718	20.36%	91	1.08%	108	1.28%	80	0.95%	4,725	55.98%	8,440
Sheboygan	10,211	53.69%	7,109	37.38%	1,247	6.56%	157	0.83%	296	1.56%	3,102	16.31%	19,020
St. Croix	5,179	62.70%	2,759	33.40%	32	0.39%	170	2.06%	120	1.45%	2,420	29.30%	8,260
Taylor	3,024	72.48%	868	20.81%	102	2.44%	90	2.16%	88	2.11%	2,156	51.68%	4,172
Trempealeau	4,402	70.76%	1,653	26.57%	20	0.32%	81	1.30%	65	1.04%	2,749	44.19%	6,221
Vernon	4,979	63.85%	2,417	31.00%	59	0.76%	220	2.82%	123	1.58%	2,562	32.85%	7,798
Vilas	1,238	66.45%	499	26.78%	64	3.44%	30	1.61%	32	1.72%	739	39.67%	1,863
Walworth	5,033	41.69%	6,439	53.33%	61	0.51%	361	2.99%	179	1.48%	-1,406	-11.65%	12,073
Washburn	2,210	65.27%	962	28.41%	78	2.30%	111	3.28%	25	0.74%	1,248	36.86%	3,386
Washington	3,602	44.90%	4,213	52.52%	114	1.42%	47	0.59%	46	0.57%	-611	-7.62%	8,022
Waukesha	4,728	31.10%	10,063	66.20%	223	1.47%	108	0.71%	80	0.53%	-5,335	-35.09%	15,202
Waupaca	5,399	52.51%	4,280	41.63%	198	1.93%	155	1.51%	249	2.42%	1,119	10.88%	10,281
Waushara	2,430	57.77%	1,589	37.78%	51	1.21%	94	2.23%	42	1.00%	841	20.00%	4,206
Winnebago	10,491	46.58%	11,407	50.65%	239	1.06%	193	0.86%	192	0.85%	-916	-4.07%	22,522
Wood	6,784	65.21%	3,089	29.69%	176	1.69%	175	1.68%	180	1.73%	3,695	35.52%	10,404
Total	412,255	51.76%	317,550	39.87%	45,268	5.68%	11,516	1.45%	9,843	1.24%	94,705	11.89%	796,432

==== Counties that flipped from Republican to Democratic ====
- Columbia
- Green Lake
- Jefferson
- Kenosha
- Marquette
- Ozaukee
- Pepin
- Portage
- Racine
- Richland
- Rock
- Walworth
- Washington
- Waukesha
- Winnebago

== Bibliography ==
- Gubernatorial Elections, 1787-1997. Washington, D.C.: Congressional Quarterly Inc. 1998. ISBN 1-56802-396-0.
- Holmes, Fred L., ed. (1925). The Wisconsin Blue Book, 1925. Madison, Wisconsin: Democrat Printing Company, State Printer.
