= Kingfield, Maine =

Town in Maine, United States

- Town
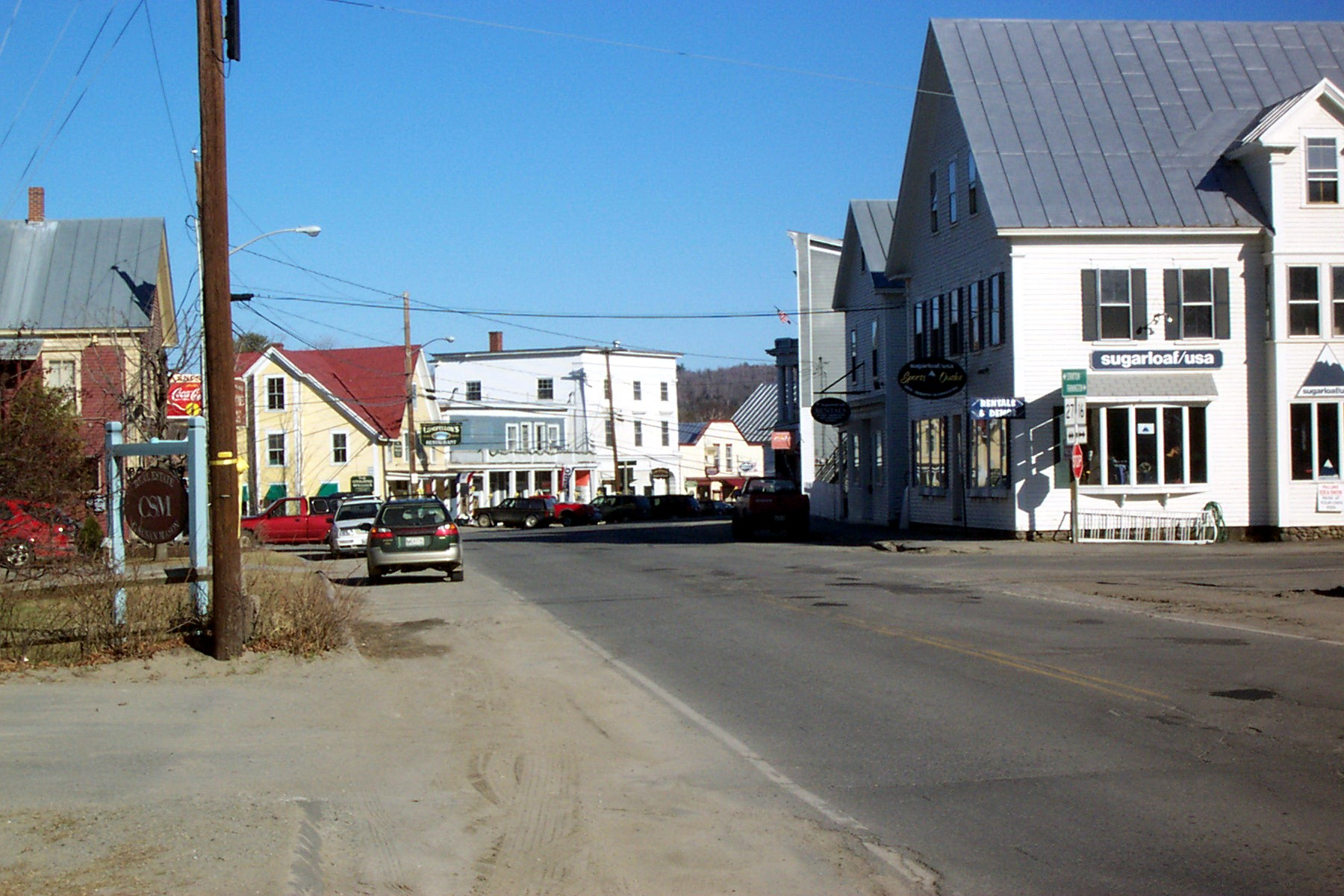
- Downtown in 2003

- Seal

- Location within the state of Maine
- Coordinates: 44°59′06″N 70°11′25″W
- Country: United States
- State: Maine
- County: Franklin
- Incorporated: January 24, 1816
- Communities: Kingfield

Area
  - Total: 43.28 sq mi (112.09 km^{2})
  - Land: 43.12 sq mi (111.68 km^{2})
  - Water: 0.16 sq mi (0.41 km^{2})
- Elevation: 1,194 ft (364 m)

Population (2020)
  - Total: 960
  - Density: 22/sq mi (8.6/km^{2})
- Time zone: UTC-5 (Eastern (EST))
  - Summer (DST): UTC-4 (EDT)
- ZIP code: 04947
- Area code: 207
- FIPS code: 23-37025
- GNIS feature ID: 582541
- Website: kingfieldme.org

Kingfield is a town in Franklin County, Maine, United States. The population was 960 at the 2020 census. Kingfield, the primary village in the town, is a census-designated place.

Kingfield is the principal gateway to Sugarloaf, a major ski resort, and is headquarters to Maine Huts and Trails.

== History ==
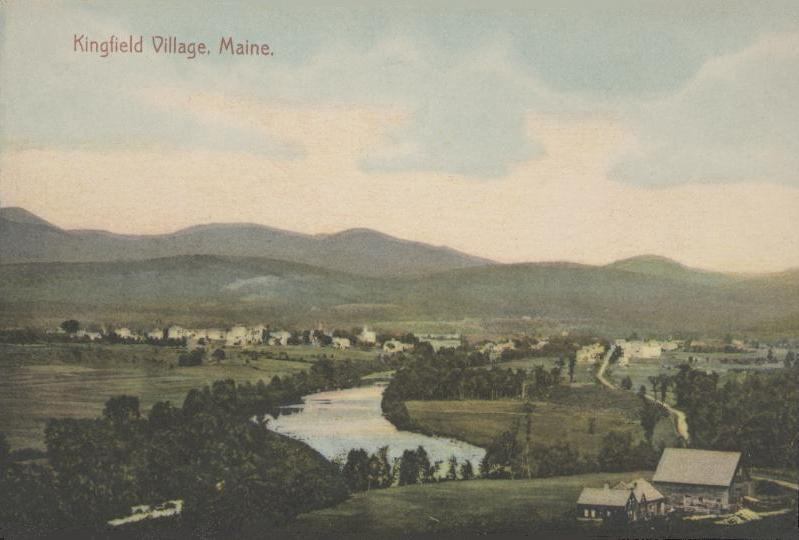
Bird's-eye view in 1909

The first recorded European visitors were John W. Dutton and Nathaniel Kimball in 1805. They returned the following year with their families and began a settlement. In 1807, William King (later to be Maine's first Governor) purchased the township as part of the Bigham Plantation. In 1816 Kingfield was incorporated as the 210th town in the Maine District of the Commonwealth of Massachusetts.

Salomon Stanley was one of the earliest town settlers. His twin sons, Francis Edgar (F.E.) and Freelan Oscar (F.O.) became famous as manufacturers of Stanley Dry Plate, bought in 1903 by Eastman Kodak, and the Stanley Steamer automobile, manufactured from 1902 to 1924. Their sister, Chansonetta, became a photographer renowned for her portraits of local rural life. The Stanley Museum celebrates the family and its accomplishments.

Kingfield supported both agriculture and industry, drawing power from the Carrabassett River to power several sawmills, a clover mill, carding mill, flour mill, tannery, and a rake factory. All these mills are now closed. There was also a depot of a narrow-gauge railroad, which ceased to run in 1936.

In the early 1950s, local residents began developing Sugarloaf Mountain as a ski resort. Today Kingfield is known primarily as a gateway to Sugarloaf. In 2007 Nestlé opened a Poland Spring bottling plant in Kingfield. Kingfield is a Trail Town of the Appalachian Trail, being near Mount Abraham and the Bigelow Range.

== Geography ==
According to the United States Census Bureau, the town has a total area of 43.28 square miles (112.09 km^{2}), of which 43.12 square miles (111.68 km^{2}) is land and 0.16 square miles (0.41 km^{2}) is water. Situated in the Carrabassett River valley, Kingfield is drained by the Carrabassett River.

=== Climate ===
This climatic region is typified by large seasonal temperature differences, with warm to hot (and often humid) summers and cold (sometimes severely cold) winters. According to the Köppen Climate Classification system, Kingfield has a humid continental climate, abbreviated "Dfb" on climate maps.

== Demographics ==
Historical population
Census	Pop.	Note	%±
1820	464		—
1830	554		19.4%
1840	671		21.1%
1850	662		−1.3%
1860	670		1.2%
1870	560		−16.4%
1880	454		−18.9%
1890	601		32.4%
1900	693		15.3%
1910	927		33.8%
1920	975		5.2%
1930	1,024		5.0%
1940	860		−16.0%
1950	963		12.0%
1960	864		−10.3%
1970	877		1.5%
1980	1,083		23.5%
1990	1,114		2.9%
2000	1,103		−1.0%
2010	997		−9.6%
2020	960		−3.7%
U.S. Decennial Census

=== 2010 census ===
As of the census of 2010, there were 997 people, 447 households, and 268 families living in the town. The population density was 23.1 inhabitants per square mile (8.9/km^{2}). There were 695 housing units at an average density of 16.1 per square mile (6.2/km^{2}). The racial makeup of the town was 97.5% White, 0.4% African American, 0.1% Native American, 0.9% Asian, 0.2% Pacific Islander, and 0.9% from two or more races. Hispanic or Latino of any race were 0.4% of the population.

There were 447 households, of which 25.1% had children under the age of 18 living with them, 47.9% were married couples living together, 6.9% had a female householder with no husband present, 5.1% had a male householder with no wife present, and 40.0% were non-families. 30.9% of all households were made up of individuals, and 12.3% had someone living alone who was 65 years of age or older. The average household size was 2.23 and the average family size was 2.78.

The median age in the town was 46.3 years. 20.8% of residents were under the age of 18; 4.4% were between the ages of 18 and 24; 21.7% were from 25 to 44; 34.3% were from 45 to 64; and 18.6% were 65 years of age or older. The gender makeup of the town was 49.8% male and 50.2% female.

=== 2000 census ===
As of the census of 2000, there were 1,103 people, 454 households, and 304 families living in the town. The population density was 25.4 inhabitants per square mile (9.8/km^{2}). There were 659 housing units at an average density of 15.2 per square mile (5.9/km^{2}). The racial makeup of the town was 98.37% White, 0.09% Native American, 0.18% Asian, 0.09% Pacific Islander, 0.27% from other races, and 1.00% from two or more races. Hispanic or Latino of any race were 0.18% of the population. 24.8% were of English, 18.0% American, 12.1% Irish, 8.0% French, 6.5% German, 5.3% French Canadian and 5.0% Finnish ancestry according to Census 2000.

There were 454 households, out of which 32.6% had children under the age of 18 living with them, 51.5% were married couples living together, 11.5% had a female householder with no husband present, and 33.0% were non-families. 24.9% of all households were made up of individuals, and 11.5% had someone living alone who was 65 years of age or older. The average household size was 2.43 and the average family size was 2.90.

In the town, the population was spread out, with 26.8% under the age of 18, 6.7% from 18 to 24, 29.5% from 25 to 44, 23.2% from 45 to 64, and 13.8% who were 65 years of age or older. The median age was 36 years. For every 100 females, there were 95.2 males. For every 100 females age 18 and over, there were 85.9 males.

The median income for a household in the town was $29,250, and the median income for a family was $37,614. Males had a median income of $27,059 versus $20,547 for females. The per capita income for the town was $15,954. About 5.1% of families and 9.5% of the population were below the poverty line, including 9.3% of those under age 18 and 14.9% of those age 65 or over.

== Culture ==
- The Kingfield POPS! charitable organization (2003)

== Sites of interest ==
- Frank Hutchins House, listed on the National Register of Historic Places, and home of the Kingfield Historical Society Museum
- Stanley Museum

== Education ==
Kingfield is part of Regional School Unit Number 58 and Maine School Administrative District Number 58.

Schools in the district include Kingfield Elementary School for students from Kindergarten to grade 8.

== Notable people ==
- Baychar (born 1949), visual artist
- Eugene Clark (1850–1932), Wisconsin state senator
- Edward L. Dexter (1922–2001), Maine state legislator
- Chansonetta Stanley Emmons, photographer
- William King, first governor of Maine
- Francis E. Stanley, inventor, businessman
- Freelan O. Stanley, inventor, businessman
