= Senator Blaine =

Senator Blaine may refer to:

- James G. Blaine (1830–1893), U.S. Senator from Maine from 1876 to 1881
- John J. Blaine (1875–1934), U.S. Senator from Wisconsin from 1927 to 1933
