= 1922 Wisconsin gubernatorial election =

- November 7, 1922
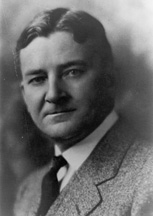

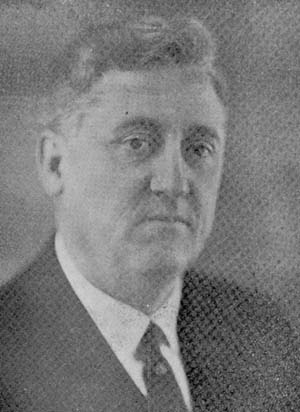

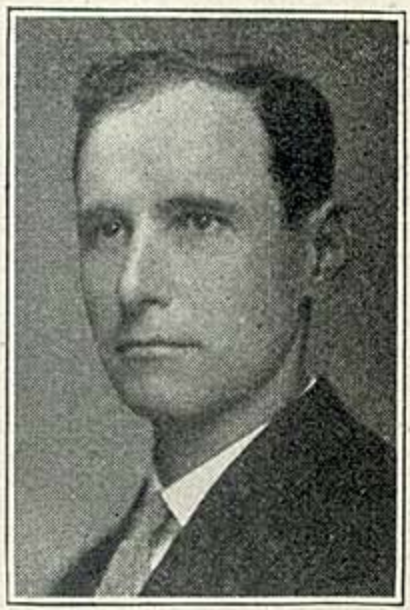
Nominee	John J. Blaine	Arthur A. Bentley	Louis A. Arnold
Party	Republican	Independent Democrat	Social-Democratic
Popular vote	367,929	51,061	39,570
Percentage	76.36%	10.60%	8.21%
- County results Blaine: 50–60% 70–80% 80–90% 90–100%
Governor before election
John J. Blaine
Republican
Elected Governor
John J. Blaine
Republican

The 1922 Wisconsin gubernatorial election was held on November 7, 1922. Primary elections were held on September 5, 1922.

Incumbent Republican Governor John J. Blaine won re-election to a second term, defeating Democratic nominee Arthur A. Bentley and Social-Democratic nominee Louis A. Arnold.

To date, this is the only time any gubernatorial candidate in Wisconsin has won every county in the state.

== Primary election ==
=== Republican party ===
==== Candidates ====
- John J. Blaine, incumbent Governor
- A. C. McHenry, unsuccessful candidate for Republican nomination for U.S. Senate in 1920
- William J. Morgan, incumbent Attorney General of Wisconsin

==== Results ====
Republican primary results
Party	Candidate	Votes	%
Republican	John J. Blaine (incumbent)	336,453	67.22%
Republican	William J. Morgan	147,379	29.44%
Republican	A. C. McHenry	16,716	3.34%
Total votes		500,548	100.00%

=== Democratic party ===
==== Candidates ====
- Arthur A. Bentley, mayor of La Crosse, Democratic nominee for Wisconsin's 7th congressional district in 1918
- Karl Mathie, paper manufacturer, former president of the Friends of German Democracy

==== Results ====
Democratic primary results
Party	Candidate	Votes	%
Democratic	Arthur A. Bentley	10,313	54.57%
Democratic	Karl Mathie	8,584	45.43%
Total votes		18,897	100.00%

==== Aftermath ====
The Democratic Party was forced to run candidates as independents, as they lost legal party recognition due to failing to poll the required number of votes in the primary election.

=== Social-Democratic party ===
==== Candidates ====
- Louis A. Arnold, Tax Commissioner of Milwaukee

==== Results ====
Social-Democratic primary results
Party	Candidate	Votes	%
Social-Democratic	Louis A. Arnold	17,375	100.00%
Total votes		17,375	100.00%

=== Prohibition party ===
==== Candidates ====
- M. L. Welles

==== Results ====
Prohibition primary results
Party	Candidate	Votes	%
Prohibition	M. L. Welles	1,520	100.00%
Total votes		1,520	100.00%

=== Other party nominations ===
- Arthur A. Dietrich, Independent Socialist Labor

== General election ==
=== Results ===
1922 Wisconsin gubernatorial election
Party	Candidate	Votes	%	±%
Republican	John J. Blaine (incumbent)	367,929	76.36%	+23.38%
Democratic (Note: "Independent Democratic")	Arthur A. Bentley	51,061	10.60%	−25.24%
Social-Democratic	Louis A. Arnold	39,570	8.21%	−2.08%
Prohibition	M. L. Welles	21,438	4.45%	+3.57%
Socialist Labor (Note: "Independent Socialist Labor")	Arthur A. Dietrich	1,444	0.30%	
	Scattering	386	0.08%	
Majority		316,868	65.76%	
Total votes		481,828	100.00%	
Republican hold		Swing	+48.62%	

=== Results by county ===
County	John J. Blaine Republican		Arthur A. Bentley Democratic		Louis A. Arnold Social-Democratic		M. L. Welles Prohibition		Arthur A. Dietrich Socialist Labor		Scattering Write-in		Margin		Total votes cast
County	#	%	#	%	#	%	#	%	#	%	#	%	#	%	Total votes cast
Adams	921	89.24%	62	6.01%	13	1.26%	33	3.20%	2	0.19%	1	0.10%	859	83.24%	1,032
Ashland	2,997	87.27%	192	5.59%	46	1.34%	192	5.59%	3	0.09%	4	0.12%	2,805	81.68%	3,434
Barron	4,133	85.96%	261	5.43%	30	0.62%	351	7.30%	10	0.21%	23	0.48%	3,782 (Note: Blaine's margin over Welles)	78.66%	4,808
Bayfield	2,471	87.50%	123	4.36%	34	1.20%	185	6.55%	7	0.25%	4	0.14%	2,286	80.95%	2,824
Brown	12,159	77.25%	2,915	18.52%	124	0.79%	501	3.18%	40	0.25%	0	0.00%	9,244	58.73%	15,739
Buffalo	1,755	86.67%	151	7.46%	24	1.19%	90	4.44%	2	0.10%	3	0.15%	1,604	79.21%	2,025
Burnett	1,332	90.24%	33	2.24%	28	1.90%	75	5.08%	1	0.07%	7	0.47%	1,257	85.16%	1,476
Calumet	3,208	86.98%	362	9.82%	61	1.65%	55	1.49%	2	0.05%	0	0.00%	2,846	77.17%	3,688
Chippewa	4,747	86.06%	465	8.43%	54	0.98%	227	4.12%	11	0.20%	12	0.22%	4,282	77.63%	5,516
Clark	3,631	83.01%	429	9.81%	109	2.49%	199	4.55%	6	0.14%	0	0.00%	3,202	73.21%	4,374
Columbia	3,705	77.17%	624	13.00%	68	1.42%	367	7.64%	6	0.12%	31	0.65%	3,081	64.17%	4,801
Crawford	2,060	77.56%	469	17.66%	14	0.53%	102	3.84%	8	0.30%	3	0.11%	1,591	59.90%	2,656
Dane	14,032	82.22%	1,888	11.06%	108	0.63%	951	5.57%	80	0.47%	8	0.05%	12,144	71.15%	17,067
Dodge	7,633	74.66%	1,747	17.09%	436	4.26%	365	3.57%	42	0.41%	0	0.00%	5,886	57.58%	10,223
Door	3,011	87.48%	231	6.71%	16	0.46%	168	4.88%	15	0.44%	1	0.03%	2,780	80.77%	3,442
Douglas	7,876	85.44%	616	6.68%	94	1.02%	591	6.41%	41	0.44%	0	0.00%	7,260	78.76%	9,218
Dunn	3,386	87.04%	250	6.43%	22	0.57%	199	5.12%	22	0.57%	11	0.28%	3,136	80.62%	3,890
Eau Claire	5,316	81.87%	783	12.06%	39	0.60%	319	4.91%	34	0.52%	2	0.03%	4,533	69.81%	6,493
Florence	1,105	94.12%	45	3.83%	10	0.85%	13	1.11%	1	0.09%	0	0.00%	1,060	90.29%	1,174
Fond du Lac	7,786	78.48%	1,465	14.77%	101	1.02%	569	5.74%	0	0.00%	0	0.00%	6,321	63.71%	9,921
Forest	1,313	85.87%	125	8.18%	11	0.72%	67	4.38%	7	0.46%	6	0.39%	1,188	77.70%	1,529
Grant	6,313	78.37%	1,213	15.06%	32	0.40%	452	5.61%	26	0.32%	19	0.24%	5,100	63.31%	8,055
Green	4,619	85.36%	341	6.30%	21	0.39%	397	7.34%	7	0.13%	26	0.48%	4,222	78.03%	5,411
Green Lake	2,891	77.36%	606	16.22%	42	1.12%	164	4.39%	24	0.64%	10	0.27%	2,285	61.15%	3,737
Iowa	2,640	81.66%	338	10.45%	15	0.46%	230	7.11%	10	0.31%	0	0.00%	2,302	71.20%	3,233
Iron	1,667	94.45%	36	2.04%	30	1.70%	27	1.53%	5	0.28%	0	0.00%	1,631	92.41%	1,765
Jackson	3,446	90.12%	214	5.60%	17	0.44%	131	3.43%	9	0.24%	7	0.18%	3,232	84.52%	3,824
Jefferson	6,413	79.13%	1,273	15.71%	63	0.78%	313	3.86%	37	0.46%	5	0.06%	5,140	63.43%	8,104
Juneau	2,972	83.41%	379	10.64%	46	1.29%	146	4.10%	16	0.45%	4	0.11%	2,593	72.78%	3,563
Kenosha	6,876	83.14%	830	7.62%	252	3.05%	471	5.70%	41	0.50%	0	0.00%	6,246	75.53%	8,270
Kewaunee	3,351	87.42%	395	10.31%	23	0.60%	56	1.46%	5	0.13%	3	0.08%	2,956	77.12%	3,833
La Crosse	6,632	72.31%	1,693	18.46%	45	0.49%	765	8.34%	34	0.37%	3	0.03%	4,939	53.85%	9,172
Lafayette	3,126	79.44%	561	14.26%	15	0.38%	221	5.62%	9	0.23%	3	0.08%	2,565	65.18%	3,935
Langlade	3,660	78.95%	654	14.11%	45	0.97%	260	5.61%	17	0.37%	0	0.00%	3,006	64.84%	4,636
Lincoln	4,198	82.04%	704	13.76%	40	0.78%	159	3.11%	16	0.31%	0	0.00%	3,494	68.28%	5,117
Manitowoc	8,943	86.62%	927	8.98%	281	2.72%	140	1.36%	33	0.32%	0	0.00%	8,016	77.64%	10,324
Marathon	10,652	86.37%	1,004	8.14%	257	2.08%	364	2.95%	56	0.45%	0	0.00%	9,648	78.23%	12,333
Marinette	4,792	82.24%	557	9.56%	113	1.94%	342	5.87%	23	0.39%	0	0.00%	4,235	72.68%	5,827
Marquette	1,702	78.43%	320	14.75%	12	0.55%	127	5.85%	9	0.41%	0	0.00%	1,382	63.69%	2,170
Milwaukee	57,310	55.99%	9,582	9.36%	33,103	32.34%	2,178	2.13%	168	0.16%	15	0.01%	24,207 (Note: Blaine's margin over Arnold)	23.65%	102,356
Monroe	3,129	86.87%	210	5.83%	27	0.75%	225	6.25%	9	0.25%	2	0.06%	2,904	80.62%	3,602
Oconto	4,405	85.75%	494	9.62%	32	0.62%	196	3.82%	6	0.12%	4	0.08%	3,911	76.13%	5,137
Oneida	3,058	78.94%	543	14.02%	107	2.76%	139	3.59%	27	0.70%	0	0.00%	2,515	64.92%	3,874
Outagamie	10,910	84.40%	1,427	11.04%	72	0.56%	496	3.84%	21	0.16%	0	0.00%	9,483	73.36%	12,926
Ozaukee	2,945	83.71%	451	12.82%	65	1.85%	41	1.17%	16	0.45%	0	0.00%	2,494	70.89%	3,518
Pepin	927	74.16%	151	12.08%	21	1.68%	132	10.56%	18	1.44%	1	0.08%	776	62.08%	1,250
Pierce	1,755	77.72%	228	10.10%	32	1.42%	234	10.36%	2	0.09%	7	0.31%	1,521	67.36%	2,258
Polk	3,950	88.74%	143	3.21%	35	0.79%	275	6.18%	31	0.70%	17	0.38%	3,675	82.57%	4,451
Portage	4,565	75.17%	1,283	21.13%	36	0.59%	147	2.42%	35	0.58%	7	0.12%	3,282	54.04%	6,073
Price	1,874	87.65%	134	6.27%	38	1.78%	81	3.79%	7	0.33%	4	0.19%	1,740	81.38%	2,138
Racine	14,219	82.85%	1,608	9.37%	420	2.45%	820	4.78%	92	0.54%	3	0.02%	12,611	73.48%	17,162
Richland	2,433	73.02%	498	14.95%	37	1.11%	350	10.50%	0	0.00%	14	0.42%	1,935	58.07%	3,332
Rock	5,879	73.62%	826	10.34%	46	0.58%	1,212	15.18%	23	0.29%	0	0.00%	4,667	58.44%	7,986
Rusk	2,030	82.39%	201	8.16%	53	2.15%	171	6.94%	9	0.37%	0	0.00%	1,829	74.23%	2,464
Sauk	3,796	82.29%	342	7.41%	60	1.30%	411	8.91%	4	0.09%	0	0.00%	3,385	73.38%	4,613
Sawyer	1,416	84.19%	130	7.73%	256	1.49%	103	6.12%	8	0.48%	0	0.00%	1,286	76.46%	1,682
Shawano	4,873	90.21%	336	6.22%	56	1.04%	110	2.04%	12	0.22%	15	0.28%	4,537	83.99%	5,402
Sheboygan	8,328	76.78%	926	8.54%	1,354	12.48%	217	2.00%	18	0.17%	3	0.03%	6,974	64.30%	10,846
St. Croix	3,307	81.41%	244	6.01%	78	1.92%	424	10.44%	6	0.15%	3	0.07%	2,883	70.97%	4,062
Taylor	2,592	86.63%	177	5.92%	84	2.81%	128	4.28%	10	0.33%	1	0.03%	2,415	80.72%	2,992
Trempealeau	2,397	86.38%	206	7.42%	12	0.43%	142	5.12%	9	0.32%	9	0.32%	2,191	78.95%	2,775
Vernon	3,146	87.61%	238	6.63%	15	0.42%	186	5.18%	6	0.17%	0	0.00%	2,908	80.98%	3,591
Vilas	914	85.26%	57	5.32%	52	4.85%	44	4.10%	5	0.47%	0	0.00%	857	79.94%	1,072
Walworth	3,021	70.53%	705	16.46%	29	0.68%	474	11.07%	28	0.65%	26	0.61%	2,316	54.07%	4,283
Washburn	1,535	83.65%	117	6.38%	40	2.18%	128	6.98%	10	0.54%	5	0.27%	1,407	76.68%	1,835
Washington	4,180	83.63%	545	10.90%	171	3.42%	96	1.92%	0	0.00%	6	0.12%	3,635	72.73%	4,998
Waukesha	5,718	71.47%	1,423	17.79%	178	2.22%	644	8.05%	36	0.45%	2	0.02%	4,295	53.68%	8,001
Waupaca	5,883	84.98%	613	8.85%	112	1.62%	292	4.22%	13	0.19%	10	0.14%	5,270	76.12%	6,923
Waushara	1,744	84.46%	186	9.01%	34	1.65%	95	4.60%	3	0.15%	3	0.15%	1,558	75.45%	2,065
Winnebago	10,112	81.14%	1,501	12.04%	175	1.40%	594	4.77%	56	0.45%	25	0.20%	8,611	69.09%	12,463
Wood	6,108	86.53%	455	6.45%	180	2.55%	269	3.81%	39	0.55%	8	0.11%	5,653	80.08%	7,059
Total	367,929	76.36%	51,061	10.60%	39,570	8.21%	21,438	4.45%	1,444	0.30%	386	0.08%	316,868	65.76%	481,828

==== Counties that flipped from Democratic to Republican ====
- Kenosha
- Langlade
- Oneida
- Racine
- Rock
- Walworth
- Waukesha
- Winnebago

== Bibliography ==
- Gubernatorial Elections, 1787-1997. Washington, D.C.: Congressional Quarterly Inc. 1998. ISBN 1-56802-396-0.
- The Wisconsin Blue Book, 1923. 1923.
