= 1905 United States Senate election in Wisconsin =

- January 25, 1905
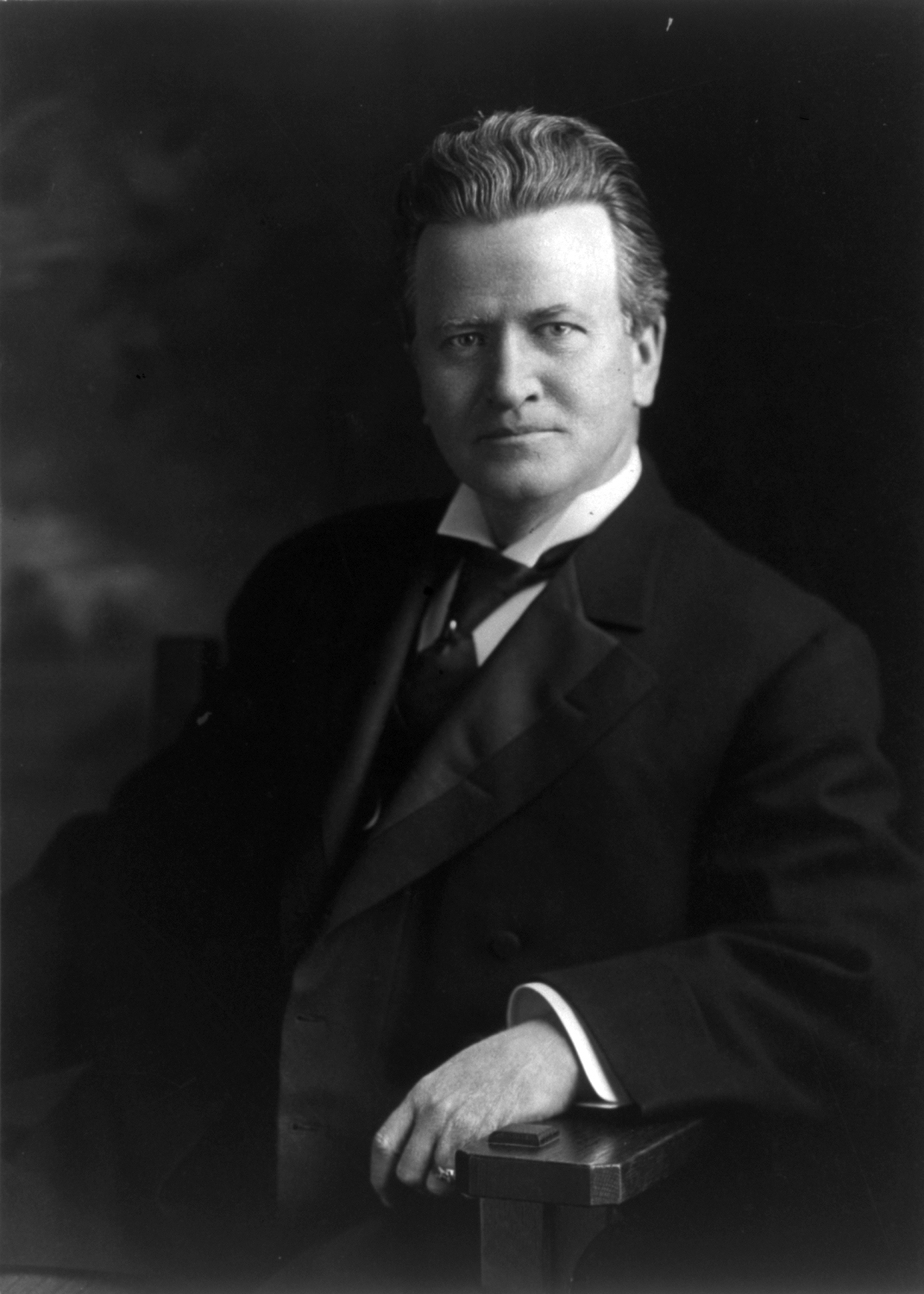

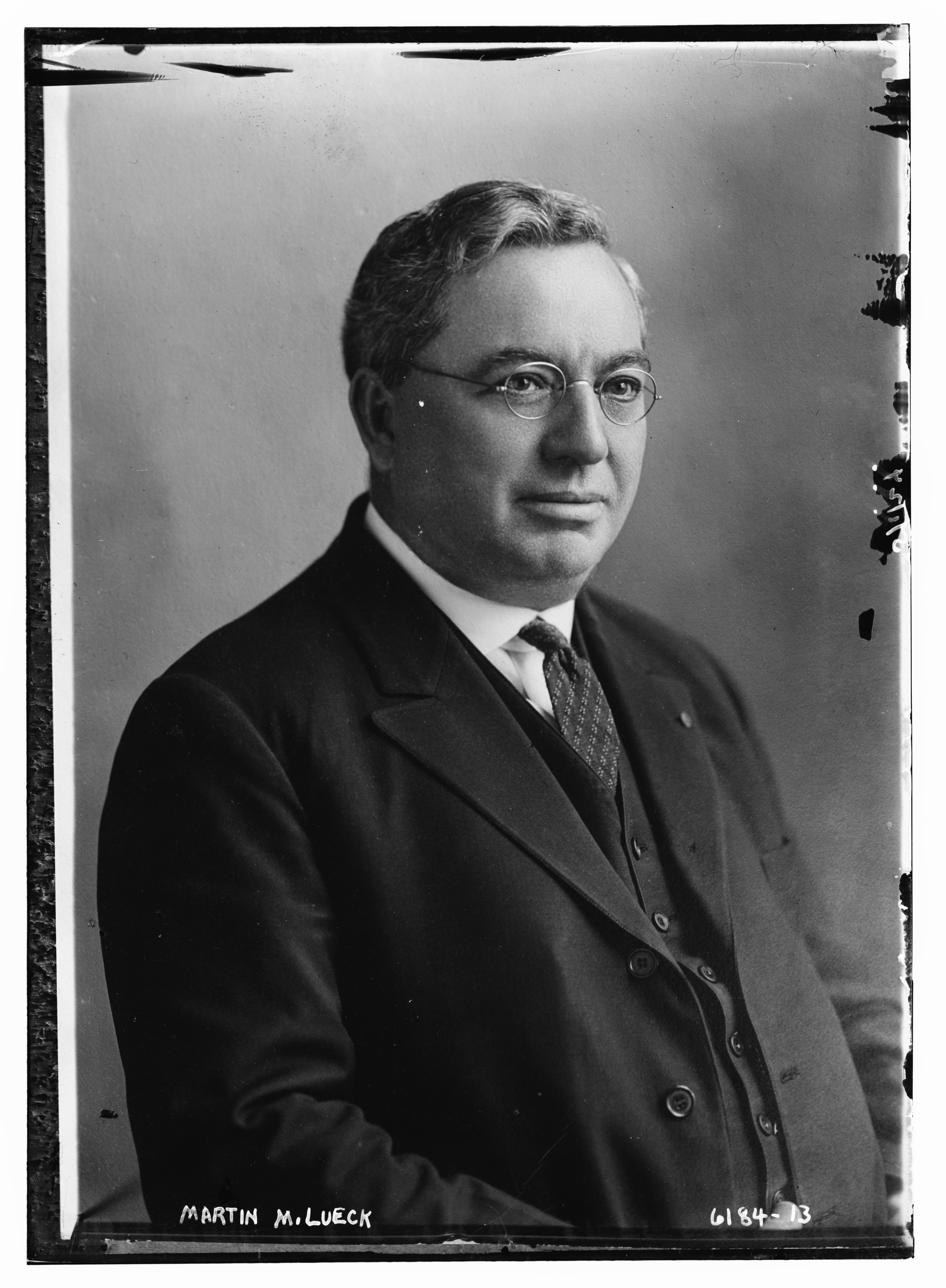

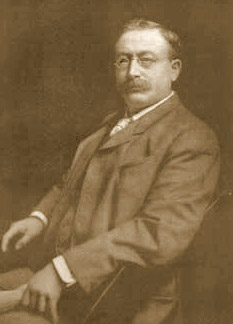
Nominee	Robert M. La Follette	Martin L. Lueck	Victor Berger
Party	Republican	Democratic	Social-Democratic
Legislative vote	101	15	5
Percentage	82.11%	12.20%	4.07%
U.S. senator before election
Joseph V. Quarles
Republican
Elected U.S. Senator
Robert M. La Follette
Republican

The 1905 United States Senate election in Wisconsin was held in the 47th Wisconsin Legislature on January 25, 1905. Incumbent Republican U.S. senator Joseph V. Quarles ran for a second term but lost re-nomination to the popular incumbent governor, Robert M. La Follette. After being elected U.S. senator, however, La Follette delayed taking office for an entire year, continuing to serve as governor through all of 1905.

In the 1905 term, Republicans held overwhelming majorities in both chambers of the Wisconsin Legislature, so had more than enough votes to elect a Republican United States senator. La Follette won the nomination on the first ballot in the Republican caucus.

== Major candidates ==
=== Democratic ===
- Martin L. Lueck, prominent lawyer and former district attorney from Dodge County.

=== Republican ===
- John J. Esch, incumbent U.S. representative of Wisconsin's 7th congressional district.
- Robert M. La Follette, incumbent governor of Wisconsin, former U.S. representative from Dane County.
- Joseph V. Quarles, incumbent U.S. senator.
- Charles M. Webb, Wisconsin circuit court judge and former U.S. attorney from Wisconsin Rapids, Wisconsin.

=== Social-Democratic ===
- Victor L. Berger, union organizer and activist, unsuccessful candidate for mayor of Milwaukee in 1904.

== Results ==
1st Vote of the 47th Wisconsin Legislature, January 25, 1905
Party	Candidate	Votes	%
Republican	Robert M. La Follette	101	82.11%
Democratic	Martin L. Lueck	15	12.20%
Social-Democratic	Victor L. Berger	5 (Note: Berger received the votes of all Socialist members.)	4.07%
Republican	Joseph V. Quarles (incumbent)	2 (Note: Republican senators George W. Wolff and James A. Wright voted for Quarles.)	1.63%
	Absent or not voting	10	
Majority		62	50.41%
Total votes		123	92.48%
Republican hold			
