= Louis A. Arnold =

American politician

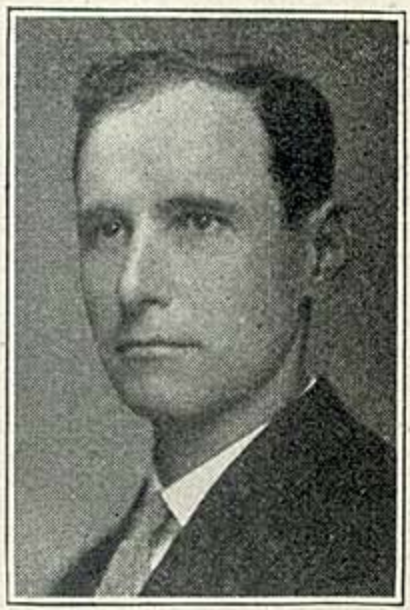
Louis A. Arnold, HVAC worker, teacher and Socialist politician from Milwaukee

Louis A. Arnold (July 13, 1872 – October 4, 1958) was an American schoolteacher, HVAC worker and Socialist politician from Milwaukee who served two terms (1915–1922) as a member of the Wisconsin State Senate representing the Milwaukee-based 7th Senate district.

== Background ==
Arnold was born in Boonville, Indiana on July 13, 1872; four months later his parents moved to Newburg in Washington County, Wisconsin, where his father had a hardware store. He attended the public schools, and graduated from the West Bend high school. He taught school one year and then went to work for the Vilter Manufacturing company of Milwaukee, where he was engaged in erecting icemaking and refrigerating plants.

== Politics ==
Arnold was a member of Milwaukee's moderate, social-democratic "Sewer Socialists." In the Social Democracy Red Book of 1900 he was listed among "One Hundred Well-Known Social Democrats." He was the Socialist nominee for a number of offices, including Congressman from the fourth Congressional district. He was a City of Milwaukee alderman for the 17th Ward from 1908 to 1912; tax commissioner of Milwaukee from 1912 to 1915; and was elected to the Wisconsin Senate's 7th District in 1914 (succeeding fellow Socialist Gabriel Zophy) and re-elected in 1918.

=== Indictment ===
On October 29, 1918, a few days before the election in which he was a candidate for re-election, Arnold (as state secretary of the Socialist Party of Wisconsin) was one of five Socialists (the most prominent being Congressman Victor Berger) indicted under the Espionage Act of 1917 due to their organized opposition to U.S. participation in the First World War. Like Berger, he was re-elected despite the highly publicized indictment, receiving 4,730 votes to 4,532 for Republican David Love.

== After the Senate ==
Arnold was the 1922 Socialist nominee for Governor of Wisconsin and came in third to Progressive Republican John James Blaine and Democrat Arthur A. Bentley, with 39,570 votes (8.21% of a total of 481,828). His Senate seat was claimed by fellow Socialist William Quick.

In 1922, Arnold was appointed Tax Commissioner of Milwaukee, with Mayor Daniel Hoan taking advantage of the absence of two objecting city council members due to illness to gain a successful vote of appointment. Arnold continued in that office until his retirement in 1939. During his tenure, he was offered a role on the State Tax Commission by Governor Philip La Follette, but preferred to remain in Milwaukee.

He was elected in 1933 as a Wet delegate to the Wisconsin convention which voted to ratify the Twenty-first Amendment to the United States Constitution. In 1941, he spoke at a Socialist meeting in support of the return of a ballot line for the Socialist Party, which had previously merged into a Farmer-Labor Progressive Federation.
