= William F. Quick =

American lawyer and politician (1885–1966)

William F. Quick, Sr.
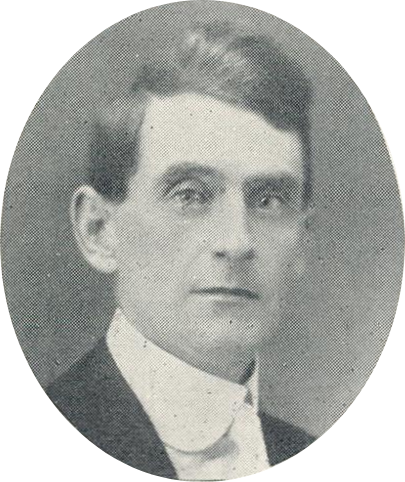

Member of the Wisconsin Senate from the 7th district
- In office January 1, 1923 – January 1, 1927
- Preceded by: Louis A. Arnold
- Succeeded by: Herbert H. Smith

Personal details
- Born: July 31, 1885 Juneau, Wisconsin
- Died: December 12, 1966 (aged 81)
- Resting place: Mount Olivet Cemetery; Milwaukee, Wisconsin
- Party: Socialist
- Spouses: Margaret Quick; (died 1972)

William F. Quick, Sr., (July 31, 1885 – December 12, 1966) was an American machinist, lawyer, and Socialist politician in Milwaukee, Wisconsin. He was the Socialist Party nominee for Governor of Wisconsin in 1924 and served one term (1923–1926) in the Wisconsin State Senate, representing the Milwaukee-based 7th District. After leaving the senate, he served as a civil court judge and city attorney in Milwaukee.

He is not to be confused with William F. Quick (born 1909) who served two terms as Sergeant at Arms of the Wisconsin State Assembly in the 1970s.

== Background ==
Quick was born in Milwaukee July 31, 1885. He was educated in the Milwaukee Public Schools and studied law in night school. He worked as a construction superintendent and a machinist, before becoming a lawyer practicing in Milwaukee.

== Political activity and public office ==
At the 1920 national convention of the Socialist Party, he was a delegate who supported the unsuccessful minority report, urging that the Socialist Party's affiliation with the Third International should be reaffirmed without reservations.

Quick had never held public office before the November 1922 general election, in which he was elected to succeed fellow Socialist Louis A. Arnold in the 7th District (the 5th, 12th and 17th Wards of the City of Milwaukee, the Cities of Cudahy and South Milwaukee and the Towns of Lake and Oak Creek) with 5,823 votes, defeating Republican John S. Kanney (who polled 5,531 votes), with 747 votes for Democrat Albert A. Ullenberg. He was assigned to the standing committees on the judiciary and on contingent expenditures.

In 1924 he was the Socialist candidate for Governor of Wisconsin, coming in third in a seven-way race with 5.68% of the vote, to Republican John J. Blaine's 51.76% and Democrat Martin L. Lueck's 39.87%. In the new Senate session, he was removed from the contingent expenditures committee, but remained on judiciary.

He did not run for re-election in 1926, and was succeeded by Republican Herbert H. Smith.

== After the Senate ==
Quick was appointed by his former foe, Governor Blaine, to serve as a civil court judge in 1926, when Judge Joseph Padway (also a former Socialist legislator) resigned; and served until 1927, when he was defeated by a "Nonpartisan" candidate. In 1930 Quick was the Socialist nominee for Congress of the United States from Wisconsin's 4th congressional district, coming in second to Republican John C. Schafer with 36.22% of the vote, to Schafer's 46.63% and Democrat William J. Kershaw's 15.46%.

He was first assistant city attorney for the City of Milwaukee from 1932-1936. When city attorney Max Raskin was defeated, Quick went back into private practice with Raskin as a partner. He would later blame the "wrecked" state of his practice and his finances on the time that he had spent working for the city.

In the September 1942 primary elections, Quick and his son William F. Quick, Jr., each got five write-in votes for Socialist city central committeeman from the 27th Ward; and William, Sr., got one vote as Socialist Wisconsin State Assembly nominee from the 17th Assembly district. William, Jr., a Progressive Party committeeman, withdrew from the committeeman race in favor of his father, and William Sr. withdrew from the Assembly race in favor of former Alderman Leonard K. Place.

He died in 1966.

== Electoral history ==
Wisconsin Gubernatorial Election, 1924
Party	Candidate	Votes	%	±%
Primary Election, September 2, 1924
Republican	John J. Blaine	230,985	49.57%	
Republican	Arthur R. Hirst	157,138	33.72%	
Republican	George Comings	36,666	7.87%	
Democratic	Martin L. Lueck	21,347	4.58%	
Socialist	William F. Quick	18,401	3.95%	
Prohibition	Adolph R. Bucknam	1,484	0.32%	
Total votes		'466,021'	'100.0%'	
General Election, November 4, 1924
Republican	John J. Blaine	412,255	51.76%	−24.60%
Democratic	Martin L. Lueck	317,550	39.87%	+29.27%
Socialist	William F. Quick	45,268	5.68%	−2.53%
Prohibition	Adolph R. Bucknam	11,516	1.45%	−3.00%
Communist	Severi Alanne	4,107	0.52%	
Independent Republican	Farrand K. Shuttleworth	4,079	0.51%	
Socialist Labor	Jose Snover	1,452	0.18%	−0.12%
	Scattering	205	0.03%	
Total votes		'796,432'	'100.0%'	+65.29%
Republican hold				

Party political offices
Preceded by Louis A. Arnold	Socialist nominee for Governor of Wisconsin; 1924	Succeeded by Herman O. Kent
