= Martin L. Lueck =

American lawyer and politician (1872–1926)

The Honorable Martin L. Lueck
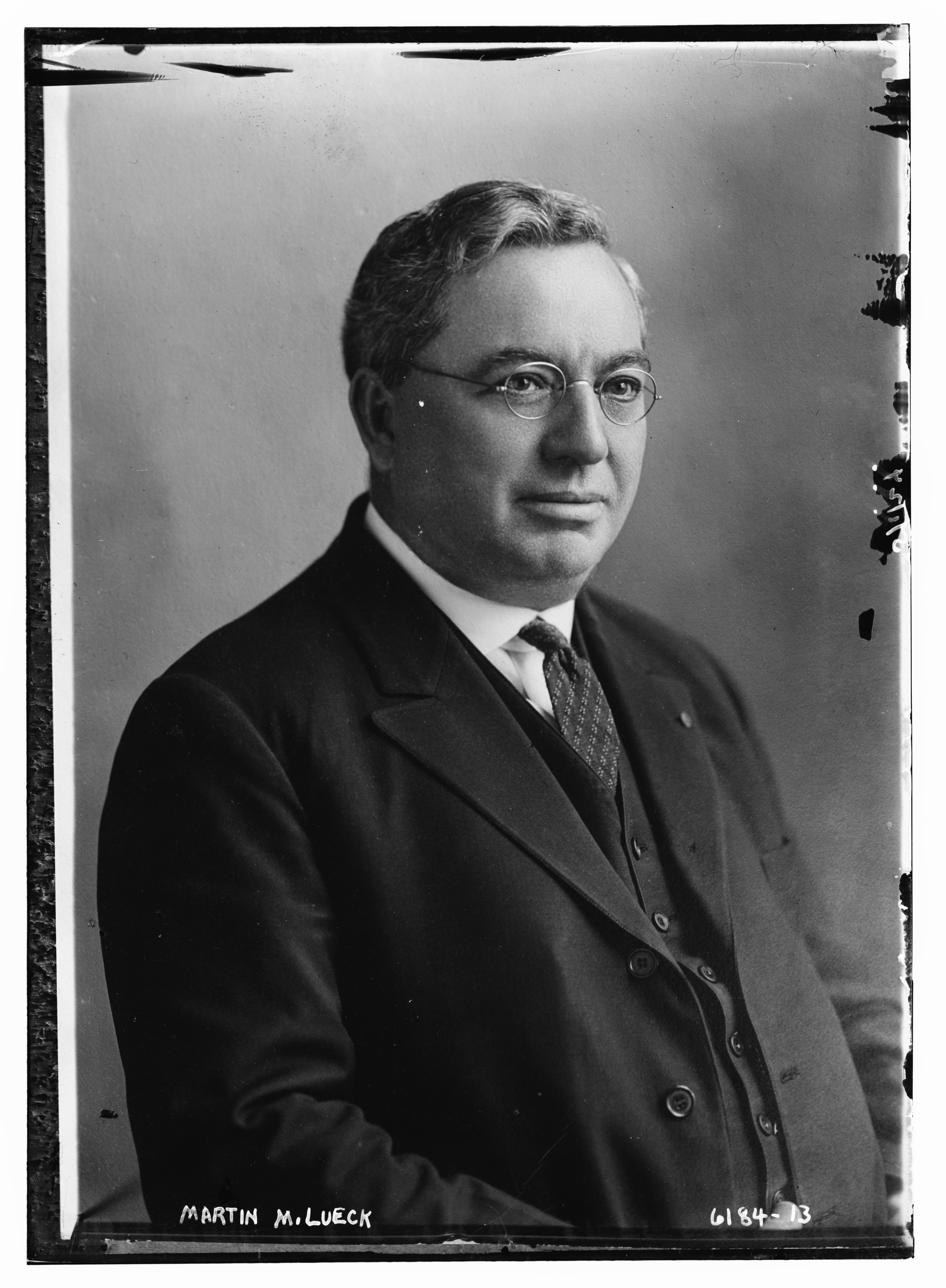

Wisconsin Circuit Court Judge for the 13th Circuit
- In office April 1907 – 1922
- Appointed by: James O. Davidson
- Preceded by: James J. Dick
- Succeeded by: Charles M. Davison

Mayor of Juneau, Wisconsin
- In office April 1906 – April 1907

District Attorney of Dodge County
- In office January 1, 1899 – January 1, 1903
- Preceded by: William N. Hamilton
- Succeeded by: Paul O. Husting

Personal details
- Born: July 24, 1872 Juneau, Wisconsin
- Died: July 18, 1926 (aged 53)
- Resting place: Juneau Cemetery; Juneau, Wisconsin
- Party: Democratic
- Spouses: Hedwig M. Kuentzel; (m. 1904; died 1939)
- Children: Ruth^{(b. 1905; died 1997)}; Dorothea^{(b. 1908; died 1927)}; Mae^{(b. 1912; died 1999)}
- Parents: Frederick William Lueck (father); Wilhelmina Philippina (Scheuer) Lueck (mother)
- Education: University of Wisconsin

Martin L. Lueck (July 24, 1872 – July 18, 1926) was an American politician and judge from Dodge County, Wisconsin. He was a Wisconsin circuit court judge for 15 years and was the Democratic Party nominee for Governor of Wisconsin in 1924.

== Biography ==
Lueck was born on July 24, 1872, in Juneau, Wisconsin. His parents were German American immigrants and had settled in Juneau in 1870. His father immigrated as a boy in 1852. He volunteered with the Union Army in the American Civil War, and served at the Battle of Gettysburg with the 26th Wisconsin Volunteer Infantry Regiment.

Martin attended the public schools in Juneau and graduated from the law department of the University of Wisconsin in 1894. He returned to Juneau and established a legal practice. He was elected district attorney for Dodge County, Wisconsin, in 1898, and earned re-election in 1900. He worked as City Attorney in Juneau and was elected mayor in 1906.

In 1907, he was appointed to the Wisconsin Circuit Court by Governor James O. Davidson to fill the vacancy caused by the death of Judge James J. Dick. He was elected to remain on the court in 1911, and was re-elected in 1917. He left office in 1922.

He was the Democratic nominee for Governor of Wisconsin in 1924, but was defeated in the general election by incumbent John J. Blaine.

== Family and personal life ==
In May 1904, (differing info has been given as to the exact date) Lueck married Hedwig M. Kuentzel. They had three daughters.

Martin Lueck died on July 18, 1926, and was buried in Juneau, Wisconsin.

== Electoral history ==
Wisconsin Gubernatorial Election, 1924
Party	Candidate	Votes	%	±%
General Election, November 4, 1924
Republican	John J. Blaine	412,255	51.76%	−24.60%
Democratic	Martin L. Lueck	317,550	39.87%	+29.27%
Socialist	William F. Quick	45,268	5.68%	−2.53%
Prohibition	Adolph R. Bucknam	11,516	1.45%	−3.00%
Communist	Severi Alanne	4,107	0.52%	
Independent Republican	Farrand K. Shuttleworth	4,079	0.51%	
Socialist Labor	Jose Snover	1,452	0.18%	−0.12%
	Scattering	205	0.03%	
Total votes		796,432	100.0%	+65.29%
Republican hold				

Party political offices
Preceded by Arthur A. Bentley	Democratic nominee for Governor of Wisconsin; 1924	Succeeded by Virgil H. Cady
Legal offices
Preceded by William N. Hamilton	District Attorney of Dodge County; 1899 – 1903	Succeeded by Paul O. Husting
Preceded by James J. Dick	Wisconsin Circuit Court Judge for the 13th Circuit; 1907 – 1922	Succeeded by Charles M. Davison
