= Frank Hutchins House =

Historic house in Maine, United States

- U.S. National Register of Historic Places
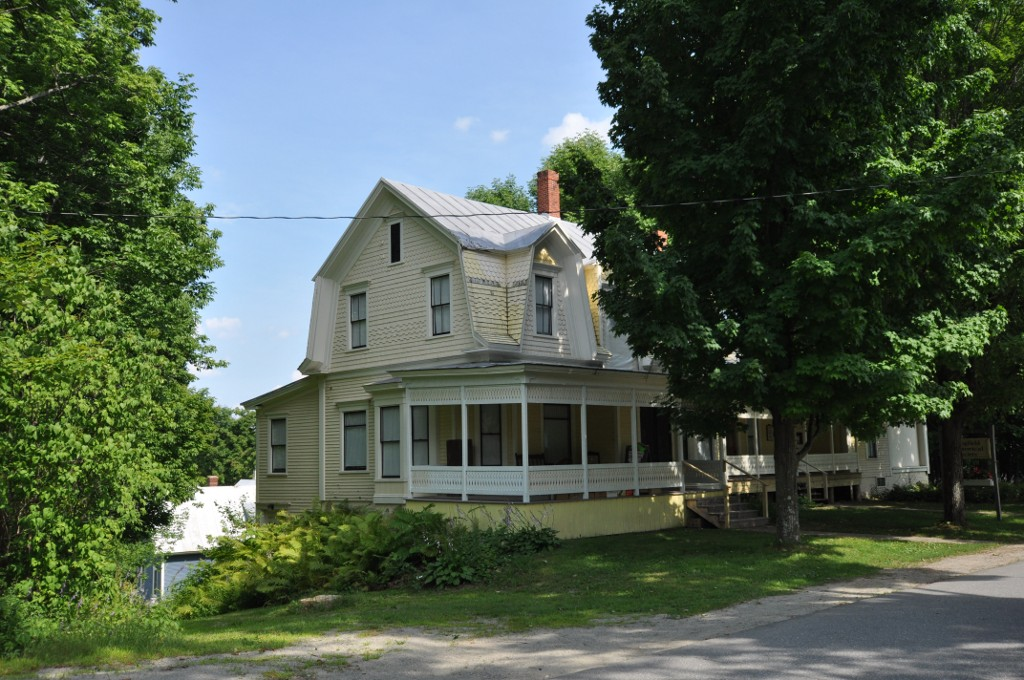

- Location within Maine Location within the United States
- Location: 47 High St., Kingfield, Maine
- Coordinates: 44°57′5″N 70°9′54″W
- Area: less than one acre
- Built: 1890
- Built by: Lavella Norton
- NRHP reference No.: 86003532
- Added to NRHP: December 29, 1986

The Frank Hutchins House is a historic house at 47 High Street in Kingfield, Maine. Built in 1890, it is an architecturally and decoratively idiosyncratic work by a noted local builder, Lavella Norton, and is the best-preserved example of his work. The house is now home to the Kingfield Historical Society, and was listed on the National Register of Historic Places in 1986.

== Description ==
The Hutchins House is a 2 1/2-story wood-framed structure, basically rectangular in shape, with a number of ells and extensions to the sides and rear. The main block has a front-facing gambrel roof, which extends over a partially recessed porch extending the length of that section's right side. The porch is a modern recreation of the house's original porch, which has been removed, with fretwork decoration that differs slightly from the original. Gambrel-roofed dormers pierce the right side of the roof above the porch. The lower slope of the roof is clad in wood shingles, including several bands of decorative cut shingles, a detail repeated in the front-facing gable end. The house is attached to a carriage barn, which has been restored by the Kings field Historical Society and now houses museum displays.

The interior, accessed via the main entrance on the building's right side, follows a central hall plain, with chambers on either side on both floors. Distinctive and unusual decorative touches include Eastlake style stained glass windows, a uniquely carved staircase, and lavishly decorated metal ceilings. Window placements are sometimes unusual, and the woodwork gives the appearance of having been fashioned from whatever materials were at hand. Builtin storage spaces are also found in a number of odd and unconventional locations. Other surviving details include an early electrical intercom system and an early brick furnace in the basement.

The house was built in 1890 for Frank Hutchins, a local business executive whose activities included furniture retailing, painting, and funeral services. The builder was Lavella Norton, who built a number of Kings field's major buildings, and was locally well known for his idiosyncratic style. The Hutchins House is believed to be the best-preserved example of his work.

== See also ==
- National Register of Historic Places listings in Franklin County, Maine
