= Edward L. Dexter =

American politician (1922–2001)

Member of the Maine House of Representatives
- In office 1993–1998
- In office 1977–1990

Personal details
- Born: July 28, 1922
- Died: January 25, 2001 (aged 78)
- Party: Republican
- Occupation: Politician

Edward L. Dexter (July 28, 1922 – January 25, 2001) was an American politician from Maine. A Republican from Kingfield, Dexter served in the Maine House of Representatives from 1977 to 1990 again from 1993 to 1998. In 1998, he was defeated for re-election by Monica McGlocklin of Embden. He unsuccessfully sought to return to the legislature again in 2000.
