= M. J. Cleary =

American politician

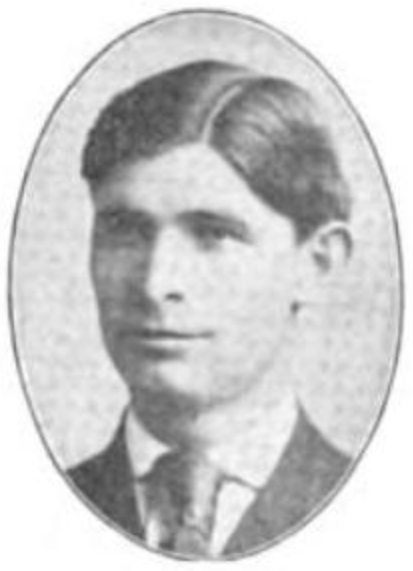

9th Commissioner of Insurance of Wisconsin
- In office June 30, 1915 – April 10, 1919
- Appointed by: Emanuel L. Philipp
- Preceded by: Herman Ekern
- Succeeded by: Platt Whitman

Member of the Wisconsin State Assembly from the Lafayette County district
- In office January 7, 1907 – January 2, 1911
- Preceded by: Richard E. Tarrell
- Succeeded by: Eugene D. Parkinson

Personal details
- Born: September 23, 1877 Blanchardville, Wisconsin, U.S.
- Died: February 21, 1947 (aged 69) Milwaukee, Wisconsin, U.S.
- Party: Republican
- Spouse: Bonnie B. Blanchard
- Children: Catherine Blanchard Cleary^{(b. 1916; died 2010)}; Mary Elizabeth (Stehlin) (Gallagher)^{(b. 1920)}; James Thomas Cleary^{(b. 1923; died 1987)}
- Profession: Lawyer

Michael James Cleary (September 23, 1877 – February 21, 1947) was an American lawyer, insurance executive, and Republican politician from Lafayette County, Wisconsin. He was the 9th Wisconsin Insurance Commissioner and served two terms in the Wisconsin State Assembly (1907 & 1909). Later he was president of the Northwestern Mutual Life Insurance Company. His name was often abbreviated as M. J. Cleary.

== Biography and career ==
Cleary was born on September 23, 1877, in Blanchardville, Wisconsin or Moscow, Wisconsin. He attended the University of Wisconsin–Madison.

Cleary was elected to the Assembly in 1906 and re-elected in 1908. He was a Republican.

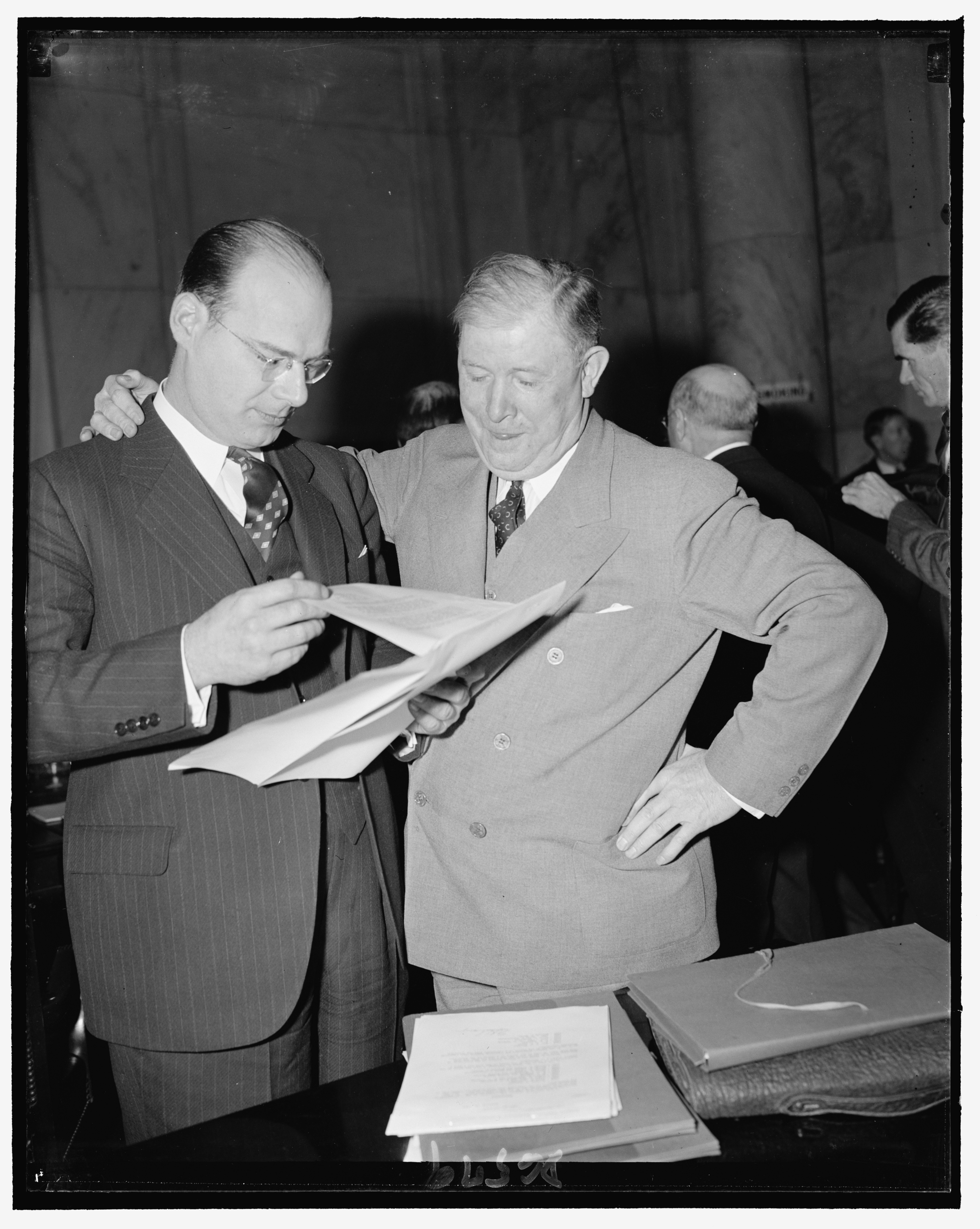
Cleary (r)

He was an attorney, and worked in insurance and banking in Blanchardville, Wisconsin. He also spent two years as the Chairman of the County Board of Lafayette County, Wisconsin.

He served as Commissioner of Insurance from July 1, 1915 to April 10, 1919. During World War I, he organized a "far reaching and effective food conservation campaign" with a "corps of 125 insurance agents."

In 1919, he assumed the presidency of the Northwestern Mutual Life Insurance Company. He also served as a member of the Board of Regents of the University of Wisconsin and of the Board of Governors of Marquette University.

He died in Milwaukee on February 21, 1947.

== Personal life and family ==
M. J. Cleary married Bonnie B. Blanchard of Blanchardville—she was a granddaughter of Alvin Blanchard, who founded Blanchardville. They had at least three children.

Their eldest daughter, Catherine Blanchard Cleary, was a pioneer woman in business, graduating from the University of Wisconsin Law School and serving as the first female board member of General Motors, AT&T, Kraft Foods, Northwestern Mutual, and Kohler Co. After the 1952 United States presidential election, she challenged president-elect Dwight D. Eisenhower to appoint a woman as Treasurer of the United States. Eisenhower responded by appointing Ivy Baker Priest, and then named Cleary as assistant treasurer. Cleary served less than a year in that role, however—she determined that the role of assistant treasurer was not needed and had the position abolished. She was subsequently appointed assistant to the Secretary of the Treasury, George M. Humphrey. She retired at the end of her business career as chairman, president, and C.E.O. of the First Wisconsin Trust Co.
