= Severi Alanne =

Finnish socialist and journalist (1879–1960)

Vieno Severin "Severi" Alanne (October 23, 1879 – May 26, 1960) was a Finnish-American socialist journalist and consumers' co-operative organizer. He is best remembered as a director and publicist for the large and popular Finnish-American consumers' co-operative in the Upper Midwest region of the United States during the first half of the 20th century.

== Early years ==
Vieno Severin Alanne, known to friends and family as Severi Alanne, was born in Hämeenlinna, Finland, on October 23, 1879. He was well educated, attending both preparatory school and a classical lyceum in his native Hämeenlinna, from which he graduated in 1897. After leaving the Hämeenlinna Lyceum, Alanne relocated to Helsinki to attend the Helsinki Polytechnic Institute, from which he graduated in 1902. He remained in the field of organic chemistry for two more years, working as an assistant to professor Gusst Komppa while continuing his post-graduate studies.

Upon completion of his graduate studies in 1903, Alanne taught as a professor of electro-chemistry at the Helsinki Polytechnic Institute and as an instructor of chemistry and later department head at a vocational school in Helsinki, remaining there until 1905.

An opponent of Tsarist autocracy in the Russian Empire, of which Finland was a part, Alanne joined the Social Democratic Party of Finland (Suomen Sosialidemokraattinen Puolue, SSP) in 1905. He was forced to emigrate from the country following the defeat of the Revolution of 1905.

== Career ==
In the United States, Alanne worked for two years as the manager of a coal mine in Hanna, Wyoming, and for two additional years as a research chemist for the Viscol Company of Cambridge, Massachusetts. He later took a position as an editor of the Finnish-language socialist daily newspaper Työmies (The Worker), located in Hancock, Michigan.

In 1919, Alanne published a major book through the Työmies Publishing House, a large and comprehensive Finnish-English translating dictionary. Alanne's work was so well-regarded that the dictionary survived to see publication a posthumous second edition, published in Finland in 1968.

Alanne found his lasting professional contribution in the field of consumer cooperation, becoming director of the growing Co-operative Central Exchange (CCE) of Superior, Wisconsin in 1920 — a position he held until 1925. At that time, Alanne moved on to fulfill a similar function for the umbrella organization of which the CCE was part, the Northern States Cooperative League, based in Minneapolis, Minnesota.

Alanne remained at that post until 1936, after which he returned to Superior to work in the educational department of the Central Co-operative Wholesale, the name by which the CCE was then known. His employment there finally ended in 1943 with his retirement at the age of 64.

=== Political career ===
Alanne made one run for public office, serving as the candidate of the Workers (Communist) Party for Governor of Wisconsin in 1924. Alanne received just under 4200 votes in the race, finishing a distant fifth out of seven candidates.

== Death and legacy ==
Severi Alanne died May 26, 1960, in Helsinki. He was 80 years old at the time of his death.

== Electoral history ==
Wisconsin Gubernatorial Election, 1924
Party	Candidate	Votes	%	±%
Primary Election, September 2, 1924
Republican	John J. Blaine	230,985	49.57%	
Republican	Arthur R. Hirst	157,138	33.72%	
Republican	George Comings	36,666	7.87%	
Democratic	Martin L. Lueck	21,347	4.58%	
Socialist	William F. Quick	18,401	3.95%	
Prohibition	Adolph R. Bucknam	1,484	0.32%	
Total votes		'466,021'	'100.0%'	
General Election, November 4, 1924
Republican	John J. Blaine	412,255	51.76%	−24.60%
Democratic	Martin L. Lueck	317,550	39.87%	+29.27%
Socialist	William F. Quick	45,268	5.68%	−2.53%
Prohibition	Adolph R. Bucknam	11,516	1.45%	−3.00%
Communist	Severi Alanne	4,107	0.52%	
Independent Republican	Farrand K. Shuttleworth	4,079	0.51%	
Socialist Labor	Jose Snover	1,452	0.18%	−0.12%
	Scattering	205	0.03%	
Total votes		'796,432'	'100.0%'	+65.29%
Republican hold				

== Works ==
- Suomalais-Englantilainen Sanakirja – Finnish-English Dictionary Editor. Superior, WI: Työmies, 1919. Reissued 1968 as Suomalais-englantilainen suursanakirja (Finnish-English General Dictionary).
- Osuustoimintaopas: Käsikirja Amerikan suomalaista osuustoimintaväkeä varten (The Cooperators' Guide: A Handbook for Finnish-American Cooperative Members). Superior, WI: Cooperative Central Exchange, 1921.
- "The Story of Co-operative Central Exchange," in Northern States Cooperative League Yearbook, 1925. Minneapolis: Northern States Cooperative League, 1925; pg. 68.
- "Through the Critical Years with the Central Exchange," in Northern States Cooperative League Yearbook, 1928. Minneapolis: Northern States Cooperative League, 1928; pp. 129–137.
- Fundamentals of Consumer Cooperation. Superior, WI: Cooperative Publishing Association, 1932.
- Kuluttajaosuustoiminnan perusteet (Basics of Consumer Cooperation). Superior, WI: Cooperative Publishing Association, 1937.
- Manual for Co-operative Directors Superior, WI: Cooperative Publishing Association, 1938.
- Englannin kielen ääntämisohjeita (On pronunciation of the English language). Porvoo, Finland: WSOY, 1956.
