= Maine Huts and Trails =

Maine Huts & Trails is a United States non-profit public service organization that maintains 80 miles of trails in Maine.

It aims to create a 180-mile network of non-motorized, multi-use trails stretching between the Mahoosuc Range in western Maine to Moosehead Lake, the state's largest water body. Much of the land for this project—including Poplar Hut site—is leased from the Penobscot Indian Nation, the original inhabitants of the region.

== Overview ==
There are currently 80 miles, and the organization has not realized its goal of maintaining 180 miles, as of February 2024.

According to plans, the southern gateway will be near Bethel, and it will terminate in Rockwood, on the western shore of Moosehead. Along the way, up to 12 wilderness lodges will be constructed, each sleeping up to 45 guests. The distance between huts will average 10 miles. The huts are open year round for day visitors and overnight guests with opportunities for hiking, paddling, and biking in the summer and cross-country skiing, fat tire biking and snowshoeing in the winter.

Larry Warren, Suzie Hockmeyer and John Willard consider route alternatives at a 2002 Maine Huts and Trails planning session. Scott Andrews photo

The proposed route very roughly parallels the Appalachian National Scenic Trail, but generally follows river valleys and utilizes many long-abandoned logging roads that criss-cross the region.

The organization has raised approximately $10 million to date and opened its first hut, at Poplar Stream Falls in Carrabassett Valley, on Feb. 16, 2008. It features several heated bunkhouses, which accommodate between four and 12 people apiece, plus a central lodge with kitchen, rest rooms, dining room and common area. Breakfast and dinner are served to guests. Three additional huts have been opened including Flagstaff Hut in 2009, Grand Falls Hut in 2010 and Stratton Brook Hut in 2012. The network now connects over 80 miles of trails between route 27 in Carrabassett Valley and route 201 in the West Forks.

A key component to the huts is the application of green energy systems reducing impact to the surrounding environment. Each hut utilizes a contained composting toilet system, solar power, and radiant floor heating powered by a wood boiler. In addition to these systems, Poplar Hut has hydro-electric power and Grand Falls Hut has a solar hot water heater. Overnight guests are welcome to join the hut staff on a "green energy tour" which describes these systems in detail and also explains the mission of the MH&T system.

The huts encourage guests to follow Leave No Trace principles while using the trail system.

Maine Huts & Trails' founder is Larry Warren of Carrabassett Valley, who first envisioned the trail network in 1974 and borrowed the huts concept from the Appalachian Mountain Club. In terms of architecture, the hut designs reflect traditional Maine sporting camps. The four huts currently in operation (Poplar Stream Falls, Stratton Brook, Grand Falls, and Flagstaff) were all built by general contractor, Carl W. "Dutch" Demshar and crew.

Promoting year-round tourism in the region is one of Warren's stated goals. He was formerly involved in developing Sugarloaf into the state's second busiest ski resort, and he envisions Maine Huts & Trails fitting into the official ecotourism campaign.

The Maine Huts & Trails Main Office is located at 496 Main Street in Kingfield, ME.
