= Co-operative Central Exchange =

The Cooperative Central Exchange headquarters facility, located in Superior, Wisconsin

Co-operative Central Exchange (CCE, Finnish: Keskusosuuskunta), founded in 1917 and known from the spring of 1931 as Central Co-operative Wholesale, was the coordinating entity of a network of consumers' co-operatives located primarily in the states of the American Upper Midwest. Based in the Great Lakes port city of Superior, Wisconsin, located adjacent to the Finnish enclave of Duluth, Minnesota, the Co-operative Central Exchange produced an array of its own branded products under the "Red Star" and "Co-operators' Best" brand names and did annual volume well in excess of $1 million from 1928 on.

The Co-operative Central Exchange was closely associated with the radical Finnish-American workers' movement associated with the Finnish Socialist Federation of the Socialist Party of America and later with the Finnish Federation of the Communist Party, USA (CPUSA). A split took place in 1931, with hardline adherents of Communist Party control departing the organization to form a rival cooperative group which lasted until 1939.

With its size and strength diminishing in the era of the supermarket, the Central Wholesale organization was terminated through merger to Midland Cooperatives in 1963, which in turn became part of the Land O'Lakes cooperative in 1982.

== History ==
=== Early years ===
During the decade of the 1920s, one of the top-selling products of the Co-operative Central Exchange was Red Star brand coffee, which until 1933 featured a Communist hammer-and-sickle on the label.

The Co-operative Central Exchange (CCE) was a cooperative federation established at a meeting of representatives of 19 Finnish-American consumers' co-operatives held in Superior, Wisconsin, on July 30, 1917. The idea for a central coordinating agency to unify the existing network of cooperative stores in the Upper Midwest of the United States had been brewing for several years, based upon a desire to buy commonly sold goods more cheaply if purchased in bulk. Also driving the cooperatives to action was discriminatory credit practices practiced by the largest regional grocery and hard goods wholesaler, who restricted the extension of credit to the cooperatives at the behest of the privately owned retailers who were competing with them. The magazine Pelto ja Koti (Farm and Home) was instrumental in coordinating the launch of the central cooperative initiative.

With a paltry $15.50 in working capital and access to free office space in Superior from a sympathetic local newspaper, the stores began pooling their wholesale orders under the CCE name. Establishment of the entity as a formal federation of cooperative stores soon followed, although the organization started small, with only a total of 15 cooperatives agreeing to join the enterprise by the end of 1917. The combination of orders won the participants in the group quantity discounts in the prices of their necessary supplies and generated a profit for participants in 1917 of $268 on a capital investment of just $480.

Shares were sold in the cooperative wholesale to member stores, raising just short of $16,500 by the end of the CCE's 10th year of existence. Additional funds were raised through the reinvestment of wholesale profits, bringing the net worth of the CCE up to about $67,300 by the end of 1927. Additional funds were raised through the sale of investment bonds and loans, which made possible the establishment of a 3-story headquarters facility in Superior.

Although originally conceived as an institution that would link farmers with consumers with reduced intermediary expense, in practice the Central Exchange quickly developed into a thriving wholesale supply operation, which ultimately manufactured and marketed its own branded products to a network of more than 200 cooperative stores.

The CCE was based upon the Rochdale system of consumer cooperation and served as a wholesale distribution center for a network of stores predominantly in the Upper Midwestern states of Michigan, Minnesota, and Wisconsin. The group also engaged in common activity with other cooperatives in the region through the Northern States Co-operative League (NSCL), established in 1921, in which the CCE was the largest constituent member. Severi Alanne, a leading member of the Co-operative Central Exchange, was the executive secretary of the NSCL during the late 1920s.

=== Educational activities ===
In addition to offering its affiliated member-stores reduced wholesale prices generated from economies of scale, the Co-operative Central Exchange conducted educational activities aimed at making retail stores more successful. These included a training school for store managers, established in 1918, and the introduction of a simple and efficient system of bookkeeping for cooperative stores developed by H.V. Nurmi. The CCE also campaigned against the practice of stores selling on credit — a risky practice which tended to create cash flow problems and to accentuate the effect of periodic economic downturns.

The first year's training program, held towards the end of June 1918, taught basic bookkeeping to 16 students. The following year this program was expanded to a four-week course and an expanded curriculum, with 40 students attending. Further expansion to a 5-week course was made in 1920, followed by a move to an 8-week program in 1927.

A total of 222 students completed the program during the first 9 years of the CCE's training program, of whom approximately 80% went on to employment in cooperative stores. Instructors included a number of top officials of the CCE and the editorial staff of Työmies, including George Halonen, Eskel Rönn, Severi Alanne, Matti Tenhunen, and H.V. Nurmi, among others.

The CCE was also influential in urging its members to centralize their operations, expanding through satellite branches rather than spinning off independent cooperative entities to alternate locations. In this way bookkeeping and purchasing operations could be consolidated and streamlined and the learning curve shortened for the administrators of new cooperative shops.

=== Brands and products ===
A politically radical institution, the CCE's best-known house brand was "Red Star," with a logo prominently featuring the hammer and sickle emblem of the communist movement.

One of the CCE's biggest items produced for sale was coffee, with sales spurred to nearly 325,000 pounds in 1927 with the introduction of vacuum packed one pound cans. This represented the second greatest product in terms of sales for the cooperative. In addition to the flagship "Red Star" brand, the CCE distributed its coffee in lesser quantities under the brand names "Peaberry," "Red Boy," "Co-operators' Favorite," and "Rochdale."

The CCE also used the Red Star brand name for its canned tomatoes, peas, corn, peaches, soup, olives and olive oil, potato starch flour, dried fruit, breakfast cereal, toothpicks, matches, and other products.

The "Co-operators' Best" brand name was used by the CCE for wheat flour, work gloves, and other dry goods.

The CCE operated its own bakery in Superior from October 1918, supplying cooperative stores throughout the region with bread and other bakery goods. Located originally in the CCE's headquarters building, by 1925 the growth of the wholesale operation was straining the facility to capacity and the decision made to move the bakery to new quarters. A one-story brick building located at the corner of 5th Street and Grand Avenue was purchased and remodeled and a new oven installed. First year sales of the bakery from its new quarters totaled $70,000.

=== Battle with the Communist Party ===
During the winter of 1929-30 a bitter split developed within the leadership of the CCE between loyal members of the rapidly centralizing Communist Party, USA (CPUSA) and those who favored an independent cooperative organization. The underlying struggle was not a radical versus conservative battle but was rather was a battle between radical factions over the question of political philosophy and tactics — should the CCE continue to remain open to all working class groups and attempting to remodel society through economic means, or should the organization become a formal disciplined auxiliary of the Communist Party, thereby lending primacy to the political struggle?

The crisis began on July 25, 1929, when a letter was received from Workers (Communist) Party leaders William Z. Foster and Max Bedacht demanding an immediate "loan" of $5,000 from the CCE to the cash-strapped party. This letter was followed by others demanding more money for other Communist Party initiatives. The Communist Party fraction (cell) at the CCE considered these instructions but chose to break with party discipline, refusing the demands for money in the name of organizational independence and keeping the matter secret from non-communist members of the CCE leadership. Only in October 1929 did the matter come to the attention of the Board of Directors of the CCE at an official meeting.

This rebellion against Communist Party authority was met with the quick expulsion of top Finnish leader Yrjö "George" Halonen from the CPUSA — this limited reaction seemingly intended as a warning to other Communists of the Co-operative Central Exchange to fall in line and accede to party demands. Top party official Robert Minor was dispatched to Wisconsin to ramp up the pressure for a return to party discipline and to deliver another financial demand: that henceforth the CCE should "donate" 1% of its annual sales to the Communist Party (that is, $10,000 per $1 million in sales).

The CCE Communist Party cell again refused this instruction from the party leadership and the Communist Party's midwestern Finnish newspaper, Työmies (The Worker) was unleashed on Halonen, editor of the group's monthly magazine, as well as business manager Eskel Rönn. The party demanded the firing by the CCE Board of Directors of the expelled Halonen but the board refused. At this point the assault of the Communist press was broadened and the entire Co-operative Central Exchange was cast as renegades to the cause of the working class. This dispute would continue throughout 1930 and into 1931.

The battle was bitter and personal, splitting families, provoking fist fights, and even leading to an attempt by Työmies to burn an entire issue of Co-operative Pyramid Builder before it could be distributed owing to its polemic coverage of the split between radical independent cooperators and Communist Party loyalists. About 1500 copies were destroyed before the effort at suppression could be halted. This escalation lead the CCE to launch its own newspaper, since the columns of Työmies were no longer available for the purpose.

It was at the 1931 spring annual meeting of stockholders that the faction opposed to direct party control won final control of the organization, changing the name to Central Cooperative Wholesale. The newly revamped Central Cooperative Wholesale also revamped the packaging on its Red Star house brand in 1933, removing the Communist hammer and sickle in favor of a new design featuring twin pine trees inside of a star.

The faction of the organization loyal to the CPUSA formed a rival organization, the Workers' and Farmers' Cooperative Association (Työläisten ja Farmarien Osuustoiminnallinen Yhteisliitto), a group which continued in existence until its termination in 1939 around the time of the Soviet invasion of Finland.

=== Official organ ===
The official organ of the CCE was the monthly magazine The Co-operative Pyramid Builder, launched in July 1926.

From 1926 the Co-operative Central Exchange launched a monthly magazine, The Co-operative Pyramid Builder, published in Superior, Wisconsin. The founding editor of the publication, who remained at the helm throughout the 1920s, was CPUSA stalwart George Halonen; its business manager was Eskel Rönn.

The 1931 split of the left wing from the organization and the associated name change of the CCE to "Co-operative Central Wholesale" also saw a change in the organization's publication, with a new name and a new format adopted. Henceforth the publication would be known as The Cooperative Builder, and a newspaper format used. This paper would survive the 1963 termination of the Central Wholesale, eventually being subsumed into Land O'Lakes Cooperative World in 1982.

The publication included news and photographs of the cooperative and socialist movements, advertisements about new products introduced for sale through member stores, as well as poems and short stories. During the 1930s left wing political content was attenuated, nearly vanishing in the years after World War II.

The first issue of The Co-operative Pyramid Builder was produced with a press run of 18,000 copies. Average circulation for the publication's inaugural year of 1926 was 8,000. The newsprint editions of The Co-operative Builder seem to have been produced in somewhat greater quantities, with the press run of the paper running in the 65,000 to 70,000 range at the time of the 1963 merger with Midland Cooperatives.

In addition to the English-language Builder, the CCE/CCW produced a publication in Finnish: the newspaper Keskusosuuskunnan Tiedonantaja (The Central Co-operative Exchange Messenger), launched as a newspaper late in 1929 at the time of the split with Työmies, changing its format and name to Työväen Osuustoimintalehti (Workers' Cooperative Magazine) in 1930. This Finnish-language magazine would continue in production until 1965.

=== Later years and termination ===
With the next generation of Finnish-Americans speaking primarily English, the Central Wholesale began to Americanize from the decade of the 1930s, a trend made plain by the organization's hiring for the first time in 1930 of a field organizer who did not speak Finnish. By the middle of the 1940s the Central Wholesale had begun to work closely with other non-Finnish cooperative coordinating agencies in the region, including Midland Cooperatives and the Farmers' Union Central Exchange.

Growth continued throughout the decade of the 1940s, with the CCW growing from a network of 126 affiliate store with 50,000 members and sales of $4.7 million in 1941 to 211 stores with about 90,000 members and sales of about $11.5 million in 1948. The next decade would not be so kind, however, as the Central Wholesale organization began a long-term decline owing in large measure to the growth of supermarkets in the United States. This loss of size and strength moved the CCW to seek formal consolidation with other like-minded enterprises in the region.

Merger plans to unite Central Wholesale with Midlands Cooperatives were finalized in December 1962. These plans were approved on March 19, 1963, by the annual meeting of Central Wholesale's members, when it was effectively terminated through merger into Midland Cooperatives. Midland Cooperatives would in turn be terminated through its merger in 1982 into the Land O'Lakes cooperative.

== See also ==
- List of cooperatives

== Citations and references ==
=== Cited sources ===
- Arnold Alanen, "The Development and Distribution of Finnish Consumers' Cooperatives in Michigan, Minnesota, and Wisconsin," in Michael Karni, Matti E. Kaups, and Douglas J. Ollila (eds.), The Finnish Experience in the Western Great Lakes Region: New Perspectives. Turku, Finland: Institute for Migration, 1975; pp. 103–129.
- V.S. Alanne, Fundamentals of Consumer Cooperation. Superior, WI: Cooperative Publishing Association, 1932.
- V.S. Alanne, "The Story of Co-operative Central Exchange," in Northern States Cooperative League Yearbook, 1925. Minneapolis: Northern States Cooperative League, 1925; pg. 68.
- V.S. Alanne, "Through the Critical Years with the Central Exchange," in Northern States Cooperative League Yearbook, 1928. Minneapolis: Northern States Cooperative League, 1928; pp. 129–137.
- Clarke A. Chambers, "The Cooperative League of the United States of America, 1916-1961: A Study of Social Theory and Social Action," Agricultural History, vol. 36 (April 1962), pp. 59–81.
- Bertram B. Fowler, Consumer Cooperation in America: Democracy's Way Out. New York: Vanguard Press, 1936.
- George Halonen, Why Co-operation? Consumers' Co-operative Movement in the USA. New York: Workers Library Publishers, 1928.
- Hannu Heinilä, "Amerikansuomalainen Keskusosuuskunta" (American Finnish Central Cooperative), Siirtolaisuus/Migration, vol. 29, no. 2 (2002), pp. 21–26. —In Finnish.
- Hannu Heinilä, Osuustoimintakasvatusta liiketoiminnan ja politiikan pyörteissä: Keskusosuuskunnan koulutusja valistustoiminta Yhdysvaltain Keskilännessä (1917–1963) (Cooperative Education for Business and Tumultuous Politics: The Central Cooperative's Educational and Awareness-raising Activities in the American Midwest, 1917–1963). PhD dissertation. University of Turku, 2001. —In Finnish.
- Hannu Hainilä, "'Sooner or Later You're A Cooperator': The Finnish-American Cooperative Movement," in Auvo Kostiainen (ed.), Finns in the United States: A History of Settlement, Dissent, and Integration. East Lansing, MI: Michigan State University Press, 2014; pp. 157–169.
- Walfrid Jokinen, The Finnish Cooperative Movement. Turku, Finland: Institute of General History, 1975.
- Michael Karni, Yhteishyvä — Or, For the Common Good: Finnish Radicalism in the Western Great Lakes Region, 1900-1940. PhD dissertation. University of Minnesota, 1975.
- Michael Karni, "Struggle on the Cooperative Front: The Separation of Central Cooperative Wholesale from Communism, 1929-30," in Michael Karni, Matti E. Kaups, and Douglas J. Ollila (eds.), The Finnish Experience in the Western Great Lakes Region: New Perspectives. Turku, Finland: Institute for Migration, 1975; pp. 186–201.
- Erick Kendall, And Into the Future: A Brief Story of Central Co-operative Wholesale's 25 Years of Building Towards a Better Tomorrow. Superior, WI: Cooperative Publishing Association, 1945.
- Auvo Kostiainen, The Forging of Finnish-American Communism, 1917-1924: A Study in Ethnic Radicalism. Turku, Finland: Turun Yliopisto, 1978. —In English.
- Roland Vaile (ed.), Consumers' Cooperatives in North Central States. Minneapolis, MN: University of Minnesota Press, 1941.
