= Eugene Clark (politician) =

American politician

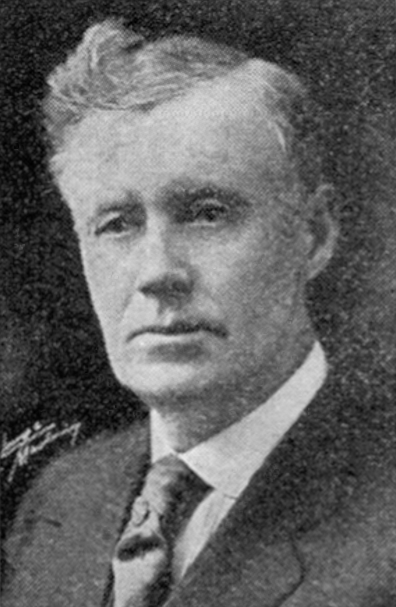

Member of the Wisconsin State Senate
- In office 1916–1924

Member of the Wisconsin State Assembly
- In office 1895, 1901

Personal details
- Born: August 14, 1850 Kingfield, Maine, US
- Died: September 9, 1932 (aged 82) La Crosse, Wisconsin, US
- Party: Republican

Eugene F. Clark (August 14, 1850 – September 9, 1932) was a member of the Wisconsin State Assembly and the Wisconsin State Senate.

== Biography ==
Clark was born on August 14, 1850, in Kingfield, Maine. He moved with his parents to Monticello, Green County, Wisconsin, in 1854 and to Galesville, Wisconsin, in 1855. Clark died in La Crosse on September 9, 1932.

== Career ==
Clark was elected to the Senate in 1916 and re-elected in 1920. Previously, he was a member of the Assembly in 1895 and 1901. He was a Republican.
