= Baychar =

American artist

- Born: Baychar Morris; 1949 (age 75–76); Augusta, Maine, U.S.
- Occupation: Visual artist
- Movement: Abstract art

Baychar (née Baychar Morris; born 1949) is an American artist. She resides in Kingfield, Maine.

Baychar was born with the name Baychar Morris in Augusta, Maine in 1949 and at times lived in Banff, Canada. The former director of the American Folk Art Museum, Dr. Robert Bishop, was her guardian. In the 1980s he introduced the artist to Andy Warhol who suggested that Baychar drop her last name.

Her work is included in the collections of the Smithsonian American Art Museum, the Minneapolis Institute of Art, and the Fine Arts Museums of San Francisco.
