= William J. Morgan (Wisconsin politician) =

American politician and lawyer (1883–1983)

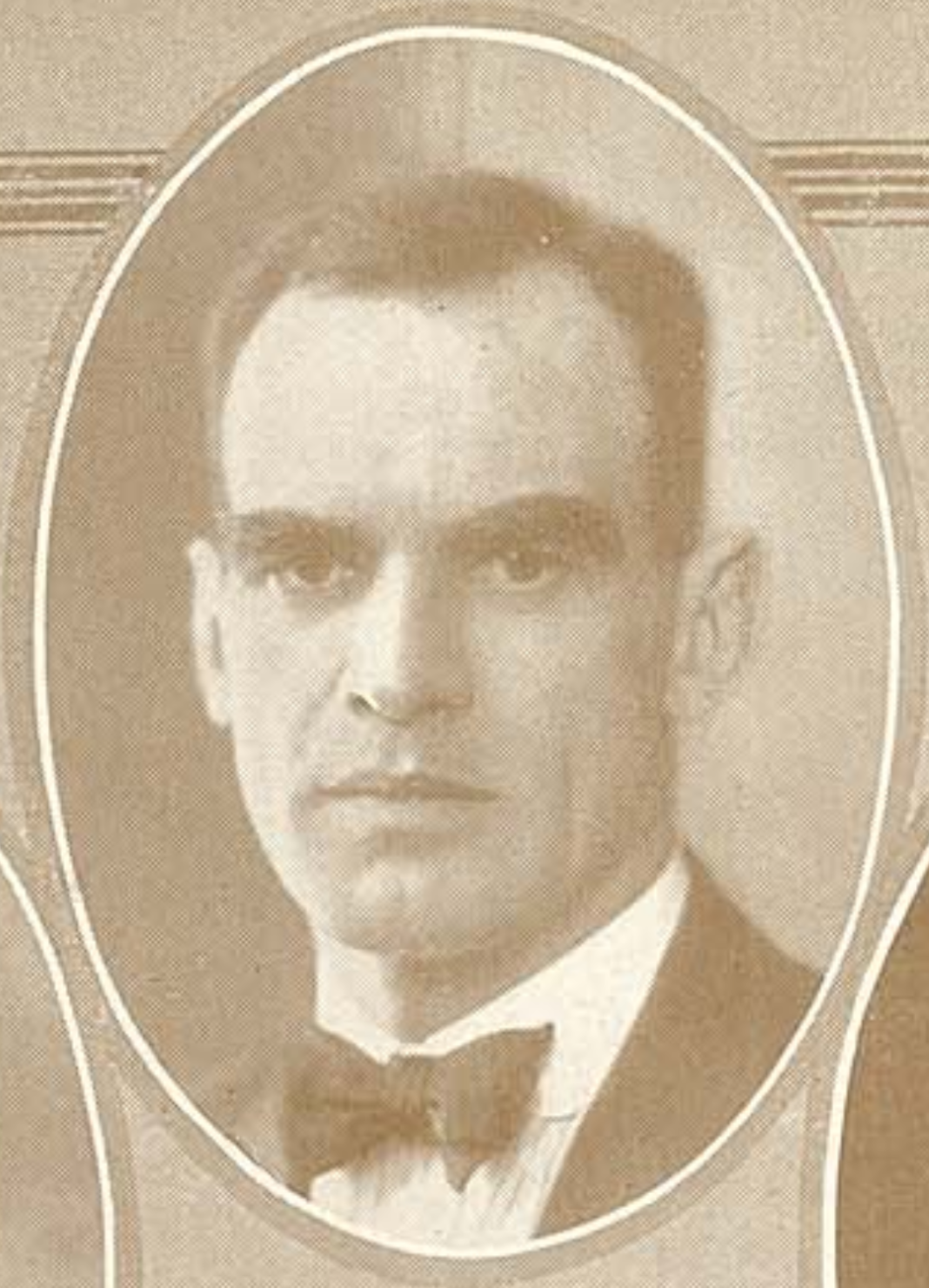

24th Attorney General of Wisconsin
- In office January 3, 1921 – January 1, 1923
- Governor: John J. Blaine
- Preceded by: John J. Blaine
- Succeeded by: Herman L. Ekern

Personal details
- Born: December 13, 1883 Charlesburg, Wisconsin
- Died: 1983 (aged 99–100)
- Party: Republican
- Education: University of Wisconsin–Madison; University of Michigan Law School

William J. Morgan (December 13, 1883 – October 1983) was an American politician and lawyer who served as the 24th Attorney General of Wisconsin from 1921 to 1923.

== Biography ==
Born in Charlesburg, Wisconsin, Morgan graduated from University of Wisconsin–Madison. He then received his law degree from University of Michigan Law School. He initially worked as a lawyer in the office of Nathan Glicksman, but in 1910 started his own practice in Milwaukee. In 1918, he started a partnership with Guy D. Goff and Frank M. Hoyt. He announced his candidacy for the Republican nomination for state Attorney General on August 20, 1920, and won the Republican primary held on September 7, defeating Adolph Kanneberg, who had been the preferred candidate of Senator Robert M. La Follette. He went on to win the general election and served as Attorney General of Wisconsin from 1921 to 1923. He was not a candidate for re-nomination in 1922. He died in October 1983.

== Notes ==
Party political offices
Preceded by John J. Blaine	Republican nominee for Attorney General of Wisconsin; 1920	Succeeded by Herman Ekern
Legal offices
Preceded by John J. Blaine	Attorney General of Wisconsin; 1921–1923	Succeeded by Herman L. Ekern
