= George E. Beedle =

American politician (1864–1927)

Member of the Wisconsin State Assembly from the Waupaca County 2nd district
- In office 1903–1906

Personal details
- Born: July 17, 1864 Shawano, Wisconsin, US

George E. Beedle (July 17, 1864 - 1927) was an American politician from Embarrass, Wisconsin. He was a member of the Wisconsin State Assembly. He died in USA at age 62 in January 1927.

== Biography ==
Beedle was born on July 17, 1864, in Shawano, Wisconsin.

== Career ==
Beedle was a member of the Assembly from 1903 to 1906. Additionally, he served as a member of the Waupaca County, Wisconsin Board of Supervisors and Insurance Commissioner of Wisconsin. He was a Republican.
