= John J. Blaine =

American lawyer and politician (1875–1934)

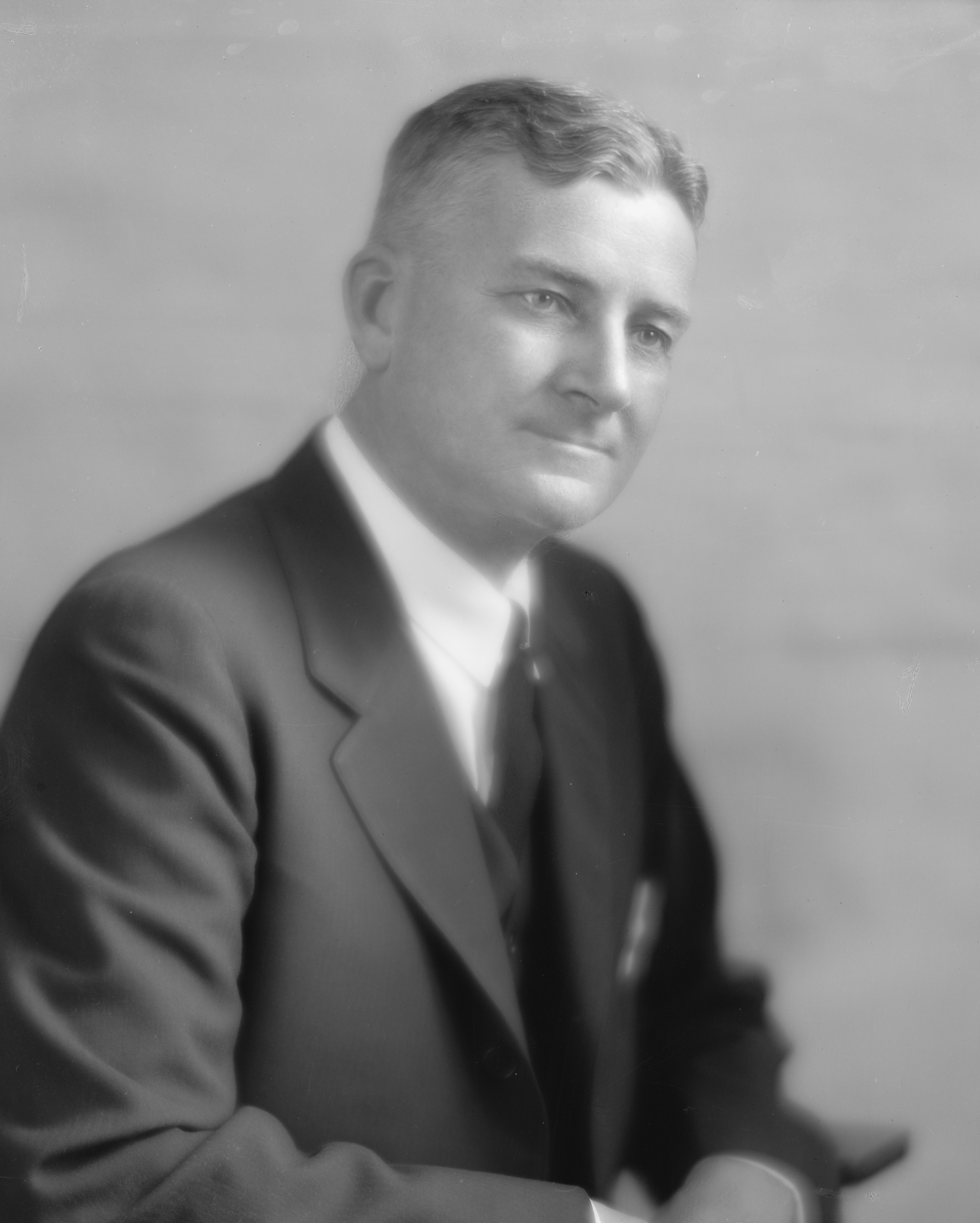
- Blaine, 1927–1934

United States Senator from Wisconsin
- In office March 4, 1927 – March 3, 1933
- Preceded by: Irvine Lenroot
- Succeeded by: Francis R. Duffy

24th Governor of Wisconsin
- In office January 3, 1921 – January 3, 1927
- Lieutenant: George F. Comings; Henry A. Huber
- Preceded by: Emanuel L. Philipp
- Succeeded by: Fred R. Zimmerman

23rd Attorney General of Wisconsin
- In office January 6, 1919 – January 3, 1921
- Governor: Emanuel L. Philipp
- Preceded by: Spencer Haven
- Succeeded by: William J. Morgan

Member of the Wisconsin Senate from the 16th district
- In office January 1, 1909 – January 1, 1913
- Preceded by: Edward E. Burns
- Succeeded by: Robert Glenn

Mayor of Boscobel, Wisconsin
- In office April 1906 – April 1907
- In office April 1903 – April 1904
- In office April 1901 – April 1902

Personal details
- Born: John James Blaine; May 4, 1875 Wingville, Wisconsin, U.S.
- Died: April 16, 1934 (aged 58) Boscobel, Wisconsin, U.S.
- Resting place: Boscobel Cemetery
- Party: Republican
- Spouses: Anna C. McSpaden; (m. 1904; died 1938)
- Children: Helen (Farris); (b. 1899; died 2000)
- Education: Valparaiso University

John James Blaine (May 4, 1875 – April 16, 1934) was an American lawyer and progressive Republican politician from Grant County, Wisconsin. He was the 24th governor of Wisconsin, serving three terms from 1921 to 1927, and served as United States senator from 1927 to 1933. Earlier, he was the 23rd attorney general of Wisconsin, a member of the Wisconsin Senate, and mayor of Boscobel, Wisconsin.

== Early life and education ==
Blaine was born on May 4, 1875, in Wingville, Wisconsin. Blaine attended the common schools, and then what is now Valparaiso University in Indiana, graduating from the university's law department in 1896. After being admitted to the bar in Wisconsin, he practiced law in Montfort before moving to Boscobel.

== Career ==
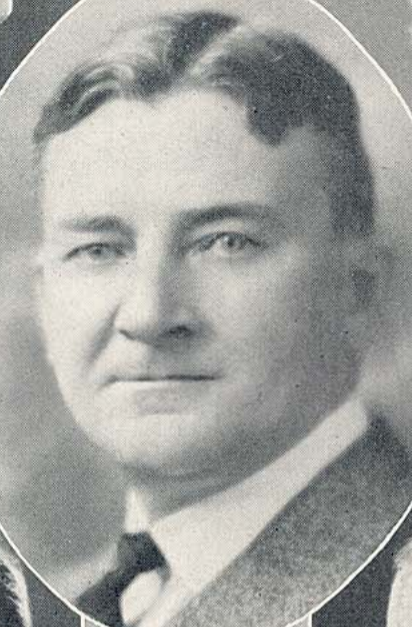
Blaine as governor.

Blaine served as vice-president of a telephone company, and as mayor of Boscobel, Wisconsin, for three one-year terms: 1901–1902, 1903–1904, and 1906–1907. He was on the Grant County Board of Supervisors, and was a member of Wisconsin State Senate (16th District) from 1909 to 1912. He served as delegate to Republican National Convention from Wisconsin, 1912 (alternate), 1916, 1920, 1924, 1928, 1932. He was Wisconsin State Attorney General, from 1919 to 1921. He served as the 24th Governor of Wisconsin from January 3, 1921, to January 3, 1927.

In 1926, he defeated the Progressive Republican United States Senator Irvine Lenroot in the Republican primary. He won the general election with 55% of the vote against Democratic, Independent and Socialist Party candidates. Blaine served in the Senate from March 4, 1927, to March 3, 1933. He was the only senator to vote against ratification of the Kellogg–Briand Pact, which was approved 85–1. Blaine asserted that ratifying the treaty represented an endorsement of British imperialism. Blaine crossed party lines during the 1928 presidential campaign and endorsed Democratic nominee Al Smith for president. He later authored the 21st Amendment (Blaine Act), which repealed Prohibition in the United States as instituted by the 18th Amendment (Volstead Act).

In 1932, John B. Chapple defeated Blaine in the Republican primary. Chapple was then defeated in the general election by F. Ryan Duffy, as part of massive Democratic victories in the national elections that year. Blaine resumed the practice of law at Boscobel and was appointed a director of the Reconstruction Finance Corporation by President Franklin Roosevelt, serving until his death.

== Death ==
Blaine died of pneumonia in Boscobel, Wisconsin, on April 16, 1934 (age 58 years, 347 days). He is interred at Boscobel Cemetery, Boscobel, Wisconsin.

== Family life ==
Son of James Ferguson Blaine (1827–1888) and Elizabeth (Johnson) Blaine (1834–1903), who were immigrants from Scotland and Norway respectively. Blaine married Anna C. McSpaden (1875–1938) on August 23, 1904.

Party political offices
Preceded by Walter C. Owen	Republican nominee for Attorney General of Wisconsin; 1918	Succeeded by William J. Morgan
Preceded by Emanuel L. Philipp	Republican nominee for Governor of Wisconsin; 1920, 1922, 1924	Succeeded by Fred R. Zimmerman
Preceded by Irvine Lenroot	Republican nominee for U.S. Senator from Wisconsin (Class 3); 1926	Succeeded by John B. Chapple
Legal offices
Preceded by Spencer Haven	Attorney General of Wisconsin; 1919 – 1921	Succeeded by William J. Morgan
Political offices
Preceded by Emanuel L. Philipp	Governor of Wisconsin; 1921 – 1927	Succeeded by Fred R. Zimmerman
U.S. Senate
Preceded by Irvine Lenroot	U.S. Senator (Class 3) from Wisconsin; 1927–1933; Served alongside: Robert M. La Follette, Jr.	Succeeded by F. Ryan Duffy
