= 1936 Wisconsin gubernatorial election =

- November 3, 1936
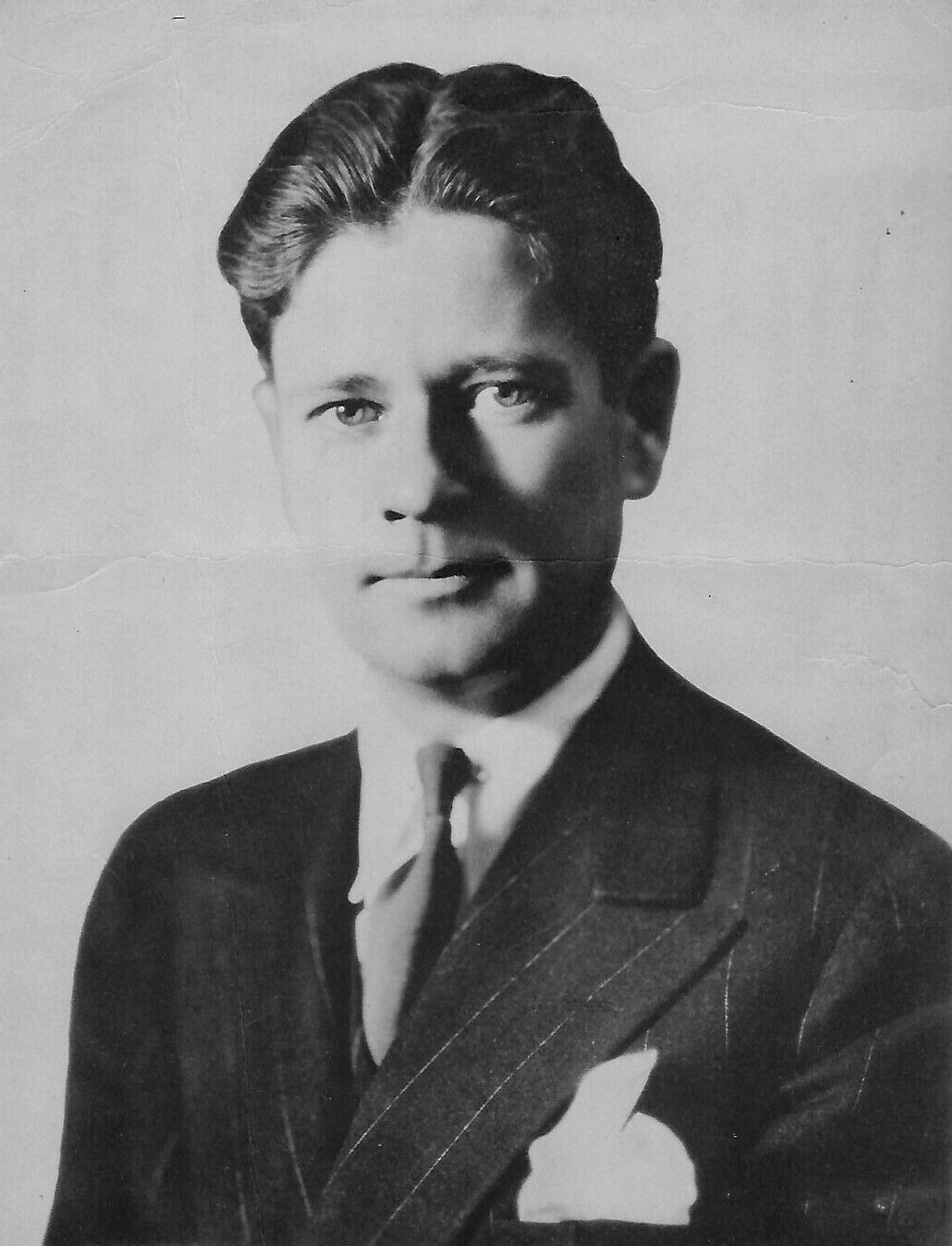

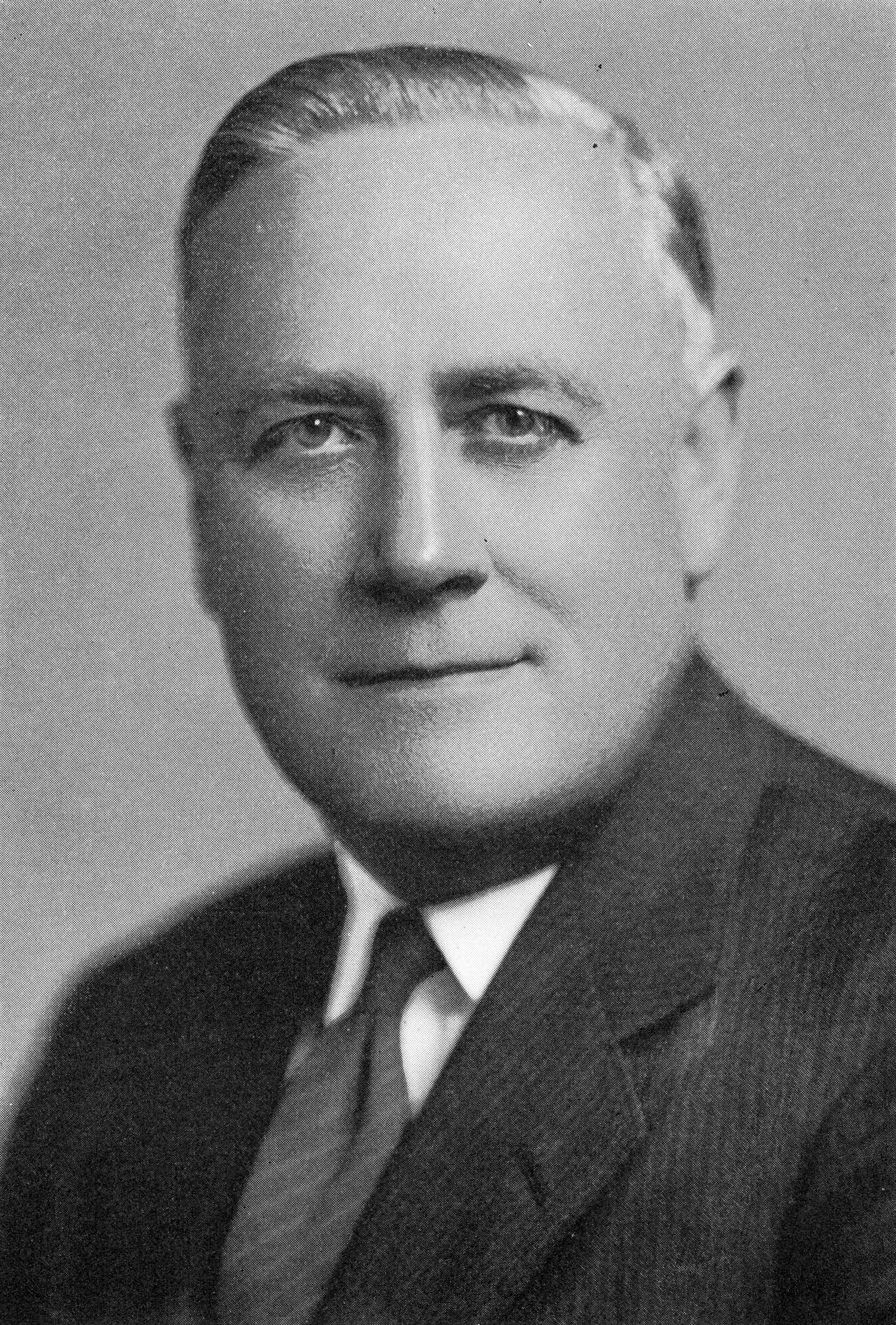

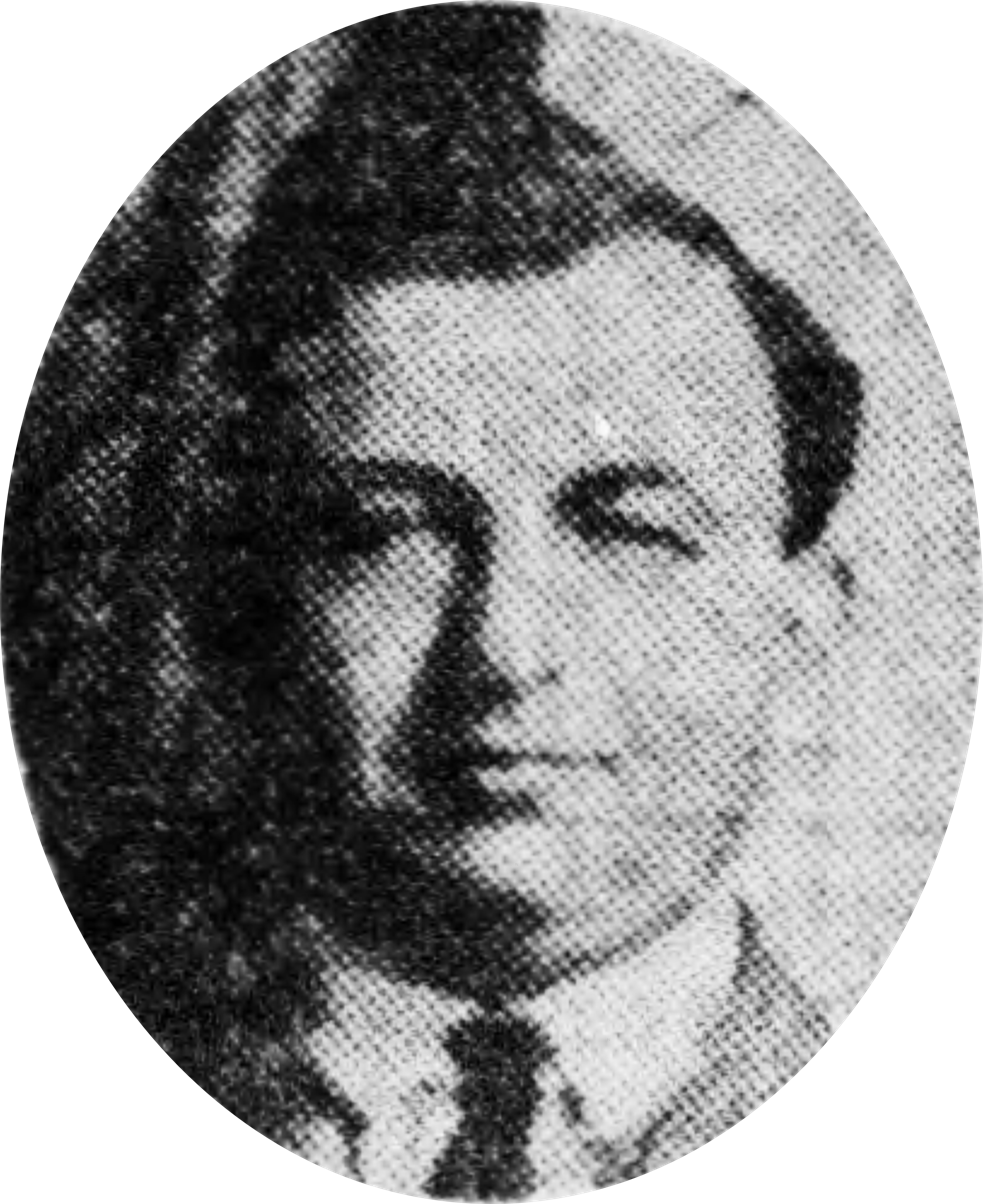
Nominee	Philip La Follette	Alexander Wiley	Arthur W. Lueck
Party	Progressive	Republican	Democratic
Popular vote	573,724	363,973	268,530
Percentage	46.38%	29.42%	21.71%
- County results La Follette: 30–40% 40–50% 50–60% 60–70% Wiley: 30–40% 40–50% 50–60% Lueck: 30–40%
Governor before election
Philip La Follette
Progressive
Elected Governor
Philip La Follette
Progressive

The 1936 Wisconsin gubernatorial election was held on November 3, 1936. Primary elections were held on September 15, 1936. Incumbent Progressive Governor Philip La Follette won re-election, defeating Republican nominee Alexander Wiley and Democratic nominee Arthur W. Lueck. As of 2022, this is the last time that Shawano County did not vote for the Republican nominee for governor and the last time Dodge County voted Democratic for governor.

== Progressive primary ==
=== Nominee ===
- Philip La Follette, incumbent Governor

=== Results ===
Progressive primary results
Party	Candidate	Votes	%
Progressive	Philip La Follette (inc.)	178,134	100.00%
Total votes		178,134	100.00%

== Republican primary ==
=== Candidates ===
==== Nominee ====
- Alexander Wiley, farmer and former Chippewa County district attorney (1909–1915)

==== Eliminated in primary ====
- John Bowman Chapple, nominee for U.S. Senate in 1932 and 1934

=== Results ===
Republican primary results
Party	Candidate	Votes	%
Republican	Alexander Wiley	86,090	51.81%
Republican	John Bowman Chapple	80,065	48.19%
Total votes		166,155	100.00%

== Democratic primary ==
=== Candidates ===
==== Nominee ====
- Arthur W. Lueck, attorney

==== Eliminated in primary ====
- William D. Carroll, State Senator

=== Results ===
Democratic primary results
Party	Candidate	Votes	%
Democratic	Arthur W. Lueck	86,912	59.22%
Democratic	William D. Carroll	59,855	40.78%
Total votes		146,767	100.00%

=== Independents and minor parties ===
- Joseph Ehrhardt, Socialist Labor, nominee for Governor in 1928, 1932 and 1934
- August F. Fehlandt, Prohibition, nominee for Lieutenant Governor in 1906
- Joseph F. Walsh, Union, merchant and farmer

== General election ==
=== Results ===
1936 Wisconsin gubernatorial election
Party	Candidate	Votes	%	±%
Progressive	Philip La Follette (incumbent)	573,724	46.38%	+7.26%
Republican	Alexander Wiley	363,973	29.42%	+11.29%
Democratic	Arthur W. Lueck	268,530	21.71%	−15.98%
Union	Joseph F. Walsh	27,934	2.26%	
Socialist Labor	Joseph Ehrhardt	1,738	0.14%	+0.11%
Prohibition	August F. Fehlandt	1,008	0.08%	−0.01%
	Scattering (Note: These are not listed in the Blue Book but are listed in the Board of Canvassers report.)	188	0.02%	
Majority		209,751	16.96%	
Total votes		1,237,095	100.00%	
Progressive hold		Swing	+15.53%	

=== Results by county ===
County	Philip La Follette Progressive		Alexander Wiley Republican		Arthur W. Lueck Democratic		Joseph F. Walsh Union		All Others Various		Margin (Note: All margins are La Follette over Wiley unless otherwise noted)		Total votes cast
County	#	%	#	%	#	%	#	%	#	%	#	%	Total votes cast
Adams	2,044	58.50%	973	27.85%	445	12.74%	27	0.80%	4	0.11%	1,071	30.65%	3,494
Ashland	4,529	52.62%	2,394	27.81%	1,578	18.33%	38	0.44%	68	0.79%	2,135	24.81%	8,607
Barron	7,279	55.07%	4,740	35.86%	996	7.54%	140	1.06%	63	0.48%	2,539	19.21%	13,218
Bayfield	3,891	59.27%	1,934	29.46%	711	10.83%	19	0.29%	10	0.15%	1,957	29.81%	6,565
Brown	12,879	43.49%	7,576	25.58%	8,731	29.48%	384	1.30%	44	0.15%	4,148 (Note: La Follette's margin over Lueck)	14.01%	29,614
Buffalo	3,522	59.69%	1,876	31.80%	445	7.54%	47	0.80%	10	0.17%	1,646	27.90%	5,900
Burnett	2,488	57.46%	1,013	23.39%	765	17.67%	55	1.27%	9	0.21%	1,475	34.06%	4,330
Calumet	2,675	38.42%	1,554	22.32%	2,588	37.17%	136	1.95%	9	0.13%	87	1.25%	6,962
Chippewa	6,134	41.37%	7,131	48.09%	1,323	8.92%	215	1.45%	24	0.16%	-997	-6.72%	14,827
Clark	5,957	46.66%	4,538	35.54%	2,056	16.10%	187	1.46%	29	0.23%	1,419	11.11%	12,767
Columbia	6,741	45.46%	5,034	33.95%	2,929	19.75%	108	0.73%	15	0.10%	1,707	11.51%	14,827
Crawford	2,771	36.69%	2,574	34.08%	1,837	24.32%	364	4.82%	7	0.09%	197	2.61%	7,553
Dane	34,413	63.75%	14,832	27.48%	4,271	7.91%	352	0.65%	111	0.21%	19,581	36.28%	53,979
Dodge	8,204	36.61%	5,108	22.79%	8,714	38.88%	342	1.53%	44	0.20%	-510 (Note: Lueck's margin over La Follette)	-2.28%	22,412
Door	3,469	48.04%	2,758	38.19%	916	12.69%	69	0.96%	9	0.12%	711	9.85%	7,221
Douglas	12,977	60.16%	4,911	22.77%	3,627	16.81%	26	0.12%	31	0.14%	8,066	37.39%	21,572
Dunn	4,827	45.43%	4,606	43.35%	944	8.88%	220	2.07%	29	0.27%	221	2.08%	10,626
Eau Claire	8,556	50.32%	6,794	39.96%	1,595	9.38%	44	0.26%	15	0.09%	1,762	10.36%	17,004
Florence	835	45.80%	596	32.69%	363	19.91%	27	1.48%	2	0.11%	239	13.11%	1,823
Fond du Lac	8,341	32.12%	8,577	33.03%	8,114	31.25%	805	3.10%	131	0.50%	-236	-0.91%	25,968
Forest	2,391	54.94%	977	22.45%	953	21.90%	26	0.60%	5	0.11%	1,414	32.49%	4,352
Grant	7,030	39.90%	6,791	38.54%	2,376	13.48%	1,401	7.95%	22	0.12%	239	1.36%	17,620
Green	5,471	56.41%	3,434	35.41%	732	7.55%	48	0.49%	14	0.14%	2,037	21.00%	9,699
Green Lake	2,179	32.59%	2,469	36.92%	1,978	29.58%	21	0.31%	40	0.60%	-290	-4.34%	6,687
Iowa	4,305	48.26%	3,502	39.26%	936	10.49%	153	1.72%	25	0.28%	803	9.00%	8,921
Iron	2,503	61.21%	807	19.74%	767	18.76%	6	0.15%	6	0.15%	1,696	41.48%	4,089
Jackson	4,097	60.63%	1,837	27.19%	787	11.65%	20	0.30%	16	0.24%	2,260	33.45%	6,757
Jefferson	7,092	41.20%	4,881	28.35%	5,013	29.12%	210	1.22%	18	0.10%	2,079	12.08%	17,214
Juneau	4,012	49.59%	2,812	34.76%	1,096	13.55%	151	1.87%	19	0.23%	1,200	14.83%	8,090
Kenosha	14,604	54.47%	7,231	26.97%	4,230	15.78%	702	2.62%	45	0.17%	7,373	27.50%	26,812
Kewaunee	2,969	47.25%	1,345	21.41%	1,887	30.03%	74	1.18%	8	0.13%	1,082	17.22%	6,283
La Crosse	13,121	57.89%	7,290	32.16%	1,967	8.68%	259	1.14%	30	0.13%	5,831	25.72%	22,667
Lafayette	3,670	40.65%	3,537	39.18%	1,584	17.55%	224	2.48%	13	0.14%	133	1.47%	9,028
Langlade	3,783	44.32%	2,234	26.17%	2,489	29.16%	12	0.14%	17	0.20%	1,294	15.16%	8,535
Lincoln	5,116	56.38%	2,890	31.85%	952	10.49%	98	1.08%	18	0.20%	2,226	24.53%	9,074
Manitowoc	10,369	44.48%	4,657	19.98%	5,721	24.54%	2,471	10.60%	96	0.41%	4,648	19.94%	23,314
Marathon	12,551	47.21%	6,743	25.36%	6,644	24.99%	594	2.23%	55	0.21%	5,808	21.85%	26,587
Marinette	5,743	41.69%	4,926	35.76%	2,981	21.64%	106	0.77%	19	0.14%	817	5.93%	13,775
Marquette	1,197	31.10%	1,886	49.00%	735	19.10%	27	0.70%	4	0.10%	-689	-17.90%	3,849
Milwaukee	132,209	45.31%	57,727	19.79%	92,407	31.67%	8,714	2.99%	712	0.24%	39,802	13.64%	291,769
Monroe	6,543	55.37%	3,981	33.69%	1,052	8.90%	163	1.38%	78	0.66%	2,562	21.68%	11,817
Oconto	5,348	50.08%	3,158	29.57%	2,027	18.98%	115	1.08%	31	0.29%	2,190	20.51%	10,679
Oneida	4,356	55.97%	2,130	27.37%	1,182	15.19%	99	1.27%	16	0.21%	2,226	28.60%	7,783
Outagamie	10,256	38.18%	9,463	35.23%	6,219	23.15%	879	3.27%	44	0.16%	793	2.95%	26,861
Ozaukee	3,192	42.00%	1,651	21.72%	2,518	33.13%	217	2.86%	22	0.29%	674	8.87%	7,600
Pepin	1,385	42.76%	1,316	40.63%	478	14.76%	53	1.64%	7	0.22%	69	2.13%	3,239
Pierce	4,354	49.50%	3,347	38.05%	607	6.90%	446	5.07%	42	0.48%	1,007	11.45%	8,796
Polk	6,687	64.82%	2,409	23.35%	913	8.85%	253	2.45%	54	0.52%	4,278	41.47%	10,316
Portage	7,054	48.16%	3,383	23.10%	4,151	28.34%	50	0.34%	9	0.06%	2,903	19.82%	14,647
Price	4,113	55.15%	2,067	27.72%	1,221	16.37%	41	0.55%	16	0.21%	2,046	27.43%	7,458
Racine	17,097	45.61%	11,009	29.37%	8,271	22.06%	1,035	2.76%	74	0.20%	6,088	16.24%	37,486
Richland	3,054	35.91%	4,145	48.74%	1,136	13.36%	121	1.42%	48	0.56%	-1,091	-12.83%	8,504
Rock	12,869	38.93%	14,803	44.78%	5,012	15.16%	318	0.96%	54	0.16%	-1,934	-5.85%	33,056
Rusk	3,363	50.53%	2,316	34.80%	896	13.46%	64	0.96%	16	0.24%	1,047	15.73%	6,655
Sauk	7,195	49.74%	5,317	36.76%	1,764	12.19%	145	1.00%	45	0.31%	1,878	12.98%	14,466
Sawyer	2,158	45.51%	1,444	30.45%	1,118	23.58%	13	0.27%	9	0.19%	714	15.06%	4,742
Shawano	7,323	57.26%	3,137	24.53%	2,285	17.87%	25	0.20%	19	0.15%	4,186	32.73%	12,789
Sheboygan	9,480	32.97%	9,084	31.59%	9,500	33.04%	652	2.27%	39	0.14%	-20	-0.07%	28,755
St. Croix	4,678	43.12%	3,778	34.83%	1,026	9.46%	1,334	12.30%	32	0.29%	900	8.30%	10,848
Taylor	3,864	56.07%	1,756	25.48%	1,149	16.67%	0	0.00%	122	1.77%	2,108	30.59%	6,891
Trempealeau	5,594	58.66%	2,738	28.71%	1,093	11.46%	95	1.00%	17	0.18%	2,856	29.95%	9,537
Vernon	5,847	52.31%	4,387	39.25%	868	7.77%	48	0.43%	28	0.25%	1,460	13.06%	11,178
Vilas	1,642	40.80%	1,312	32.60%	962	23.90%	87	2.16%	22	0.55%	330	8.20%	4,025
Walworth	4,704	29.79%	8,507	53.87%	2,346	14.86%	207	1.31%	27	0.17%	-3,803	-24.08%	15,791
Washburn	3,131	61.24%	1,543	30.18%	371	7.26%	57	1.11%	11	0.22%	1,588	31.06%	5,113
Washington	4,316	36.54%	3,290	27.86%	3,507	29.69%	679	5.75%	19	0.16%	809	6.85%	11,811
Waukesha	9,198	37.39%	9,067	36.86%	5,706	23.20%	584	2.37%	43	0.17%	131	0.53%	24,598
Waupaca	6,287	43.86%	6,265	43.71%	1,600	11.16%	157	1.10%	24	0.17%	22	0.15%	14,333
Waushara	2,438	39.29%	3,019	48.65%	618	9.96%	118	1.90%	12	0.19%	-581	-9.36%	6,205
Winnebago	11,485	36.95%	11,946	38.44%	6,908	22.23%	662	2.13%	79	0.25%	-461	-1.48%	31,080
Wood	7,769	49.66%	4,710	30.11%	2,843	18.17%	294	1.88%	29	0.19%	3,059	19.55%	15,645
Total	573,724	46.38%	363,973	29.42%	268,530	21.71%	27,934	2.26%	2,934	0.24%	209,751	16.96%	1,237,095

==== Counties that flipped from Democratic to Progressive ====
- Brown
- Calumet
- Crawford
- Kewaunee
- Langlade
- Marinette
- Milwaukee
- Outagamie
- Ozaukee
- Portage
- Racine
- Sawyer
- Vilas
- Waukesha

==== Counties that flipped from Progressive to Republican ====
- Chippewa
- Waushara

==== Counties that flipped from Democratic to Republican ====
- Fond du Lac
- Green Lake
- Marquette
- Rock
- Winnebago

== Bibliography ==
- Gubernatorial Elections, 1787-1997. Washington, D.C.: Congressional Quarterly Inc. 1998. ISBN 1-56802-396-0.
- Ohm, Howard F.; Bryhan, Leone G., eds. (1937). The Wisconsin Blue Book, 1937. Madison, Wisconsin: Democrat Printing Company, State Printer.
