= 1938 United States Senate election in Wisconsin =

- November 8, 1938
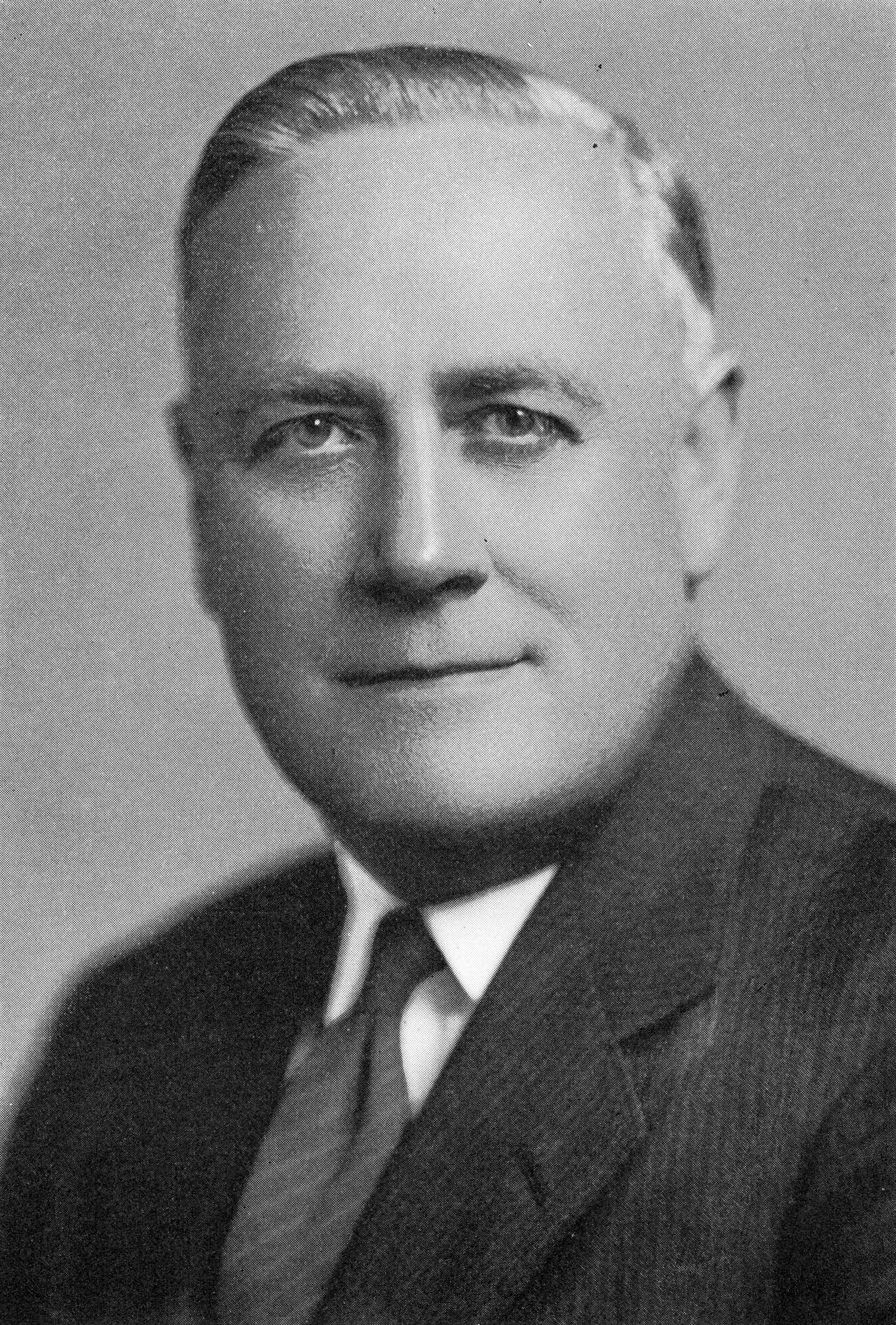

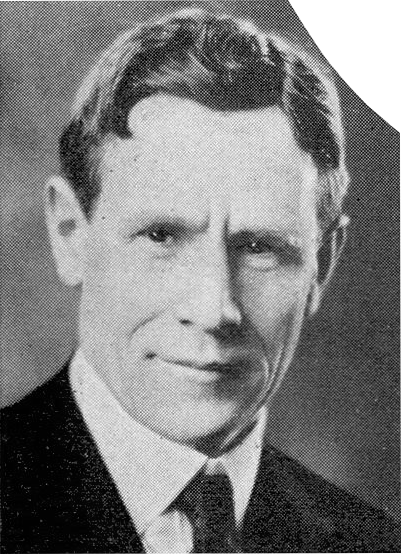

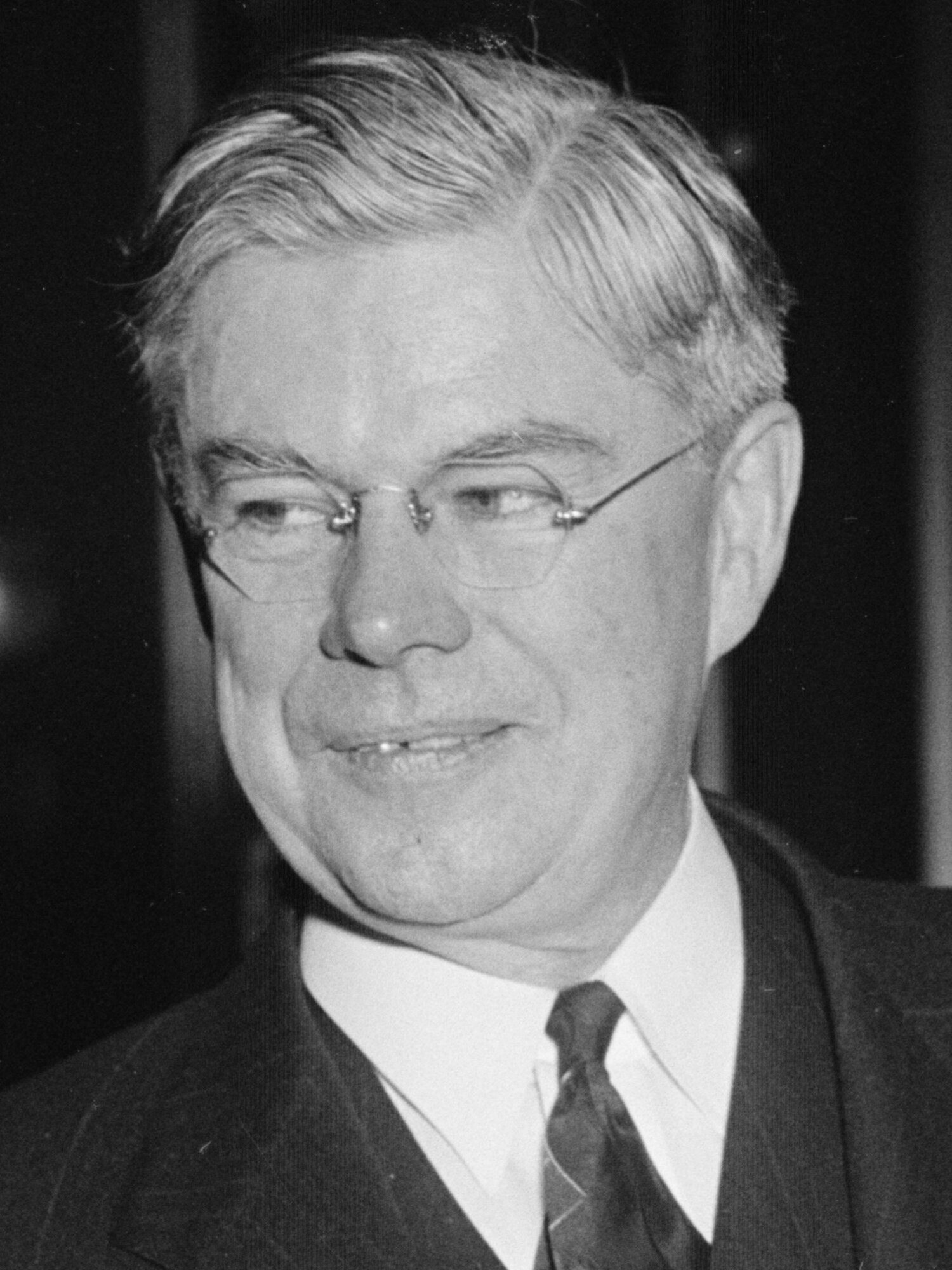
| Nominee | Alexander Wiley | Herman Ekern | F. Ryan Duffy |
| Party | Republican | Progressive | Democratic |
| Popular vote | 446,770 | 249,209 | 231,976 |
| Percentage | 47.66% | 26.58% | 24.74% |
- County results Wiley: 30–40% 40–50% 50–60% 60–70% 70–80% Ekern: 40–50% Duffy: 30–40% 40–50%
U.S. senator before election
F. Ryan Duffy
Democratic
Elected U.S. Senator
Alexander Wiley
Republican

The 1938 United States Senate election in Wisconsin was held on November 8, 1938. Incumbent Democratic U.S. Senator F. Ryan Duffy ran for a second term in office. In a three-way race, Alexander Wiley defeated Duffy and Lieutenant Governor Herman L. Ekern.

Primary elections were held on September 20. Senator Duffy was unopposed for the Democratic nomination. The Republican primary was a rematch of the 1936 gubernatorial primary; Wiley defeated John B. Chapple, who had been nominated in the previous two Senate races. After losing, Chapple entered the general election as a candidate advocating for the Townsend Act. In the Progressive primary, Ekern defeated Thomas R. Amlie by roughly 9,091 votes.

== Democratic primary ==
=== Nominee ===
- F. Ryan Duffy, incumbent senator since 1933

=== Results ===
1938 U.S. Senate Democratic primary
| Party | Candidate | Votes | % |
|---|---|---|---|
| Democratic | F. Ryan Duffy (incumbent) | 109,129 | 100.00% |
| Total votes | | 109,129 | 100.00% |

== Progressive primary ==
=== Candidates ===
==== Nominee ====
- Herman L. Ekern, Lieutenant Governor of Wisconsin

==== Eliminated in primary ====
- Thomas R. Amlie, U.S. Representative from Elkhorn

==== Declined ====
- Philip La Follette, Governor of Wisconsin

Results by county: Ekern: 50–60%; 60–70%; 70–80%; 80–90%; Amlie: 50–60%; 60–70%; 70–80%; 80–90%

=== Results ===
1938 U.S. Senate Progressive primary
| Party | Candidate | Votes | % |
|---|---|---|---|
| Progressive | Herman L. Ekern | 79,885 | 53.02% |
| Progressive | Thomas R. Amlie | 70,794 | 46.98% |
| Total votes | | 150,679 | 100.00% |

== Republican primary ==
=== Candidates ===
==== Nominee ====
- Alexander Wiley, nominee for governor in 1936

==== Eliminated in primary ====
- William J. Campbell, nominee for U.S. House from Oshkosh in 1934
- John B. Chapple, nominee for Senate in 1932 and 1934 and candidate for governor in 1936
- Stephen J. McMahon, former judge of the United States Board of Tax Appeals
- Edward J. Samp, former University of Wisconsin–Madison football star and candidate for Treasurer in 1930
- William H. Stafford, U.S. Representative from Milwaukee

=== Results ===
1938 U.S. Senate Republican primary
| Party | Candidate | Votes | % |
|---|---|---|---|
| Republican | Alexander Wiley | 70,400 | 32.91% |
| Republican | John B. Chapple | 56,403 | 26.37% |
| Republican | William Henry Stafford | 26,533 | 12.40% |
| Republican | Edward J. Samp | 25,669 | 12.00% |
| Republican | William J. Campbell | 23,790 | 11.12% |
| Republican | Stephen J. McMahon | 11,111 | 5.19% |
| Total votes | | 213,906 | 100.00% |

== General election ==
=== Candidates ===
- Fred Basset Blair, bookseller and perennial candidate (Communist)
- John B. Chapple, perennial candidate (Townsend Republican)
- F. Ryan Duffy, incumbent senator since 1933 (Democratic)
- Herman L. Ekern, Lieutenant Governor of Wisconsin (Progressive)
- Joseph Ehrhardt, perennial candidate (Socialist Labor)
- Alexander Wiley, nominee for governor in 1936 (Republican)

=== Results ===
1938 U.S. Senate election in Wisconsin
| Party | Candidate | Votes | % | ±% |
|---|---|---|---|---|
| Republican | Alexander Wiley | 446,770 | 47.66% | +11.46% |
| Progressive | Herman L. Ekern | 249,209 | 26.58% | +26.58% |
| Democratic | F. Ryan Duffy (incumbent) | 231,976 | 24.74% | −32.24% |
| Independent Republican | John B. Chapple | 7,251 | 0.77% | — |
| Communist | Fred B. Blair | 1,283 | 0.14% | −0.13% |
| Socialist Labor | Joseph Ehrhardt | 1,014 | 0.11% | — |
| Republican gain from Democratic | | Swing | | |

== See also ==
- 1938 United States Senate elections
