= 1934 United States Senate election in Wisconsin =

- November 6, 1934
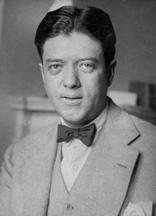

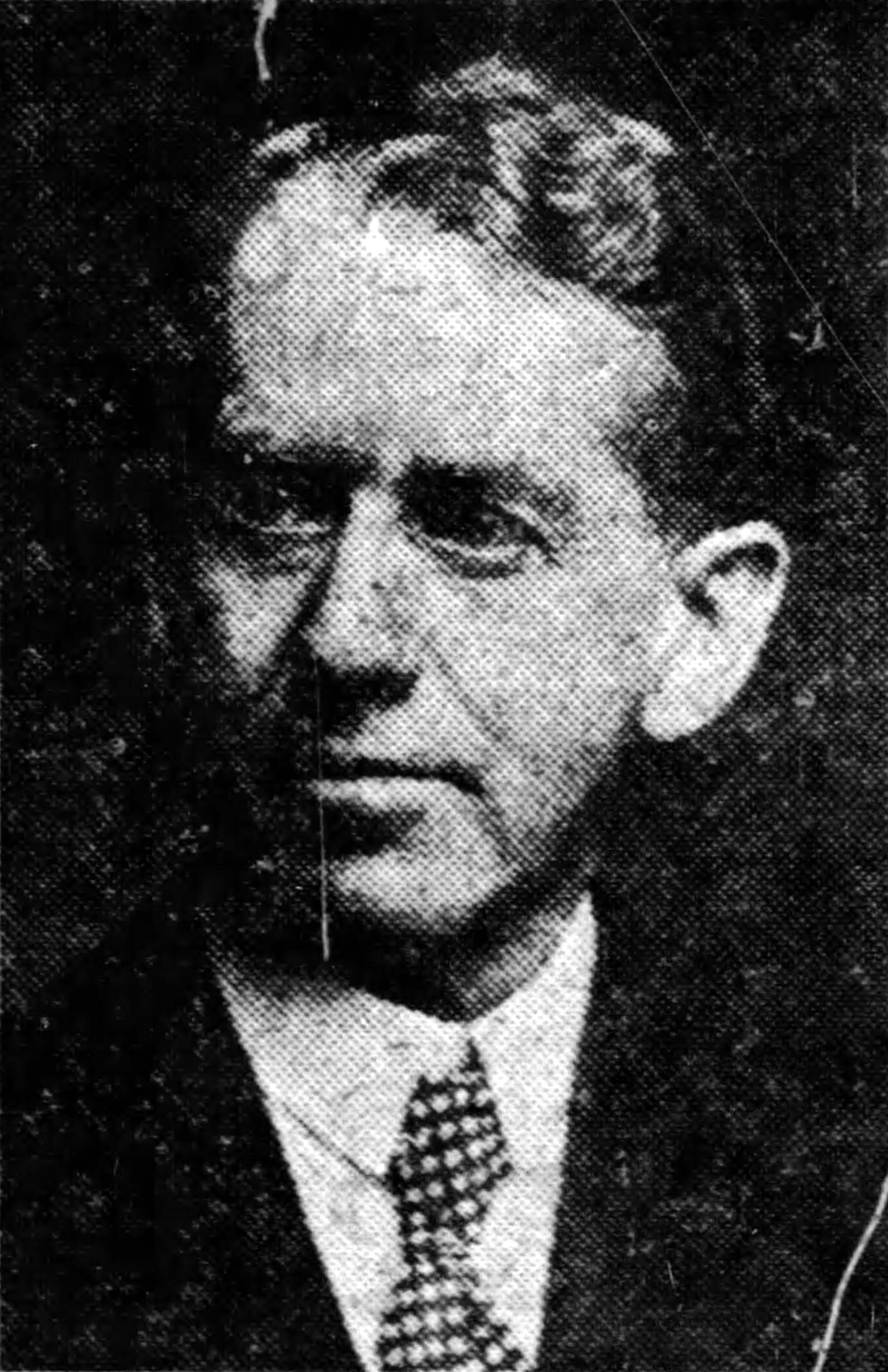

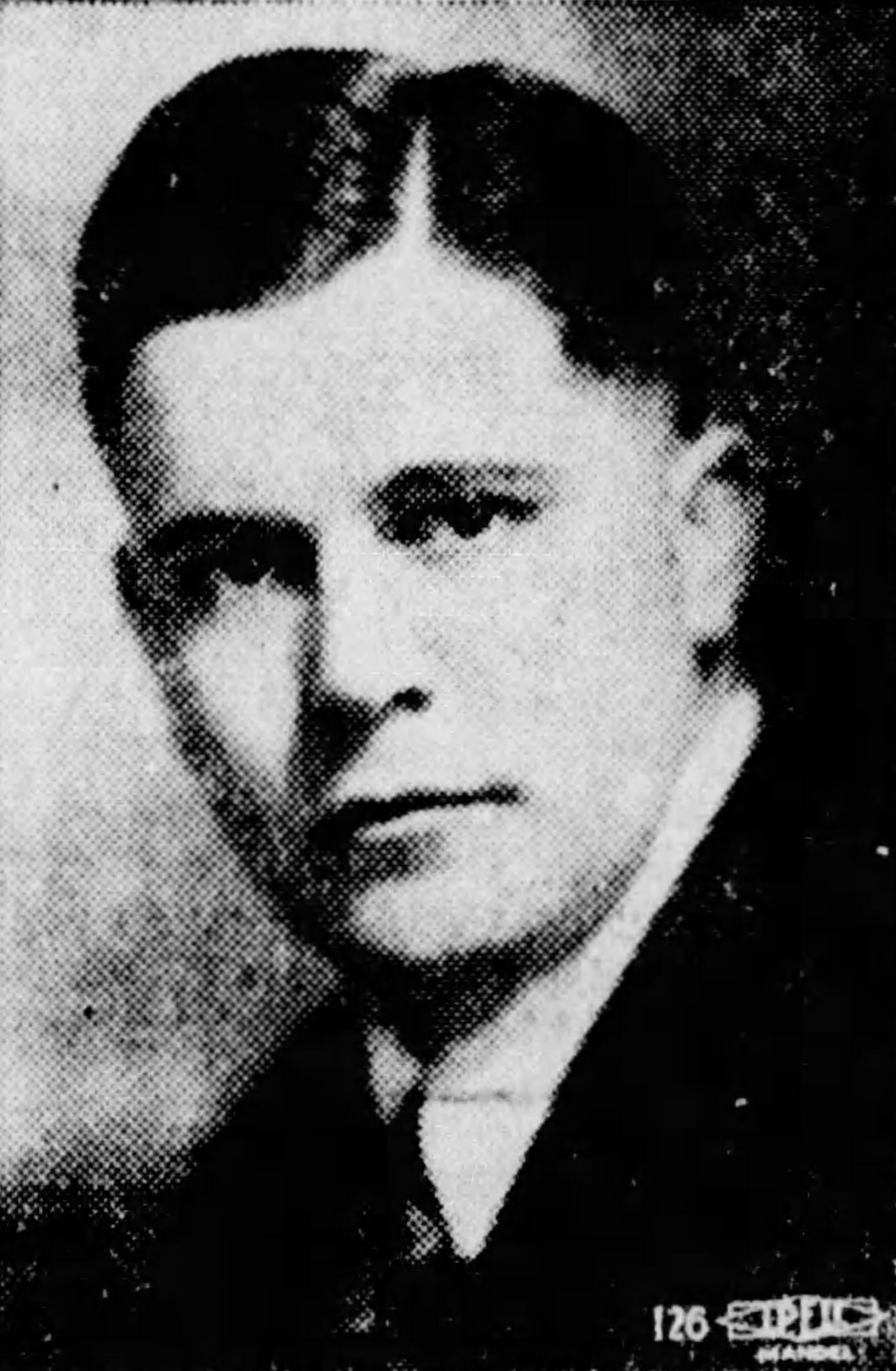
Nominee	Robert La Follette Jr.	John M. Callahan	John B. Chapple
Party	Progressive	Democratic	Republican
Popular vote	440,513	223,438	210,569
Percentage	47.78%	24.24%	22.84%
- County results La Follete Jr.: 30–40% 40–50% 50–60% 60–70% Callahan: 30–40% 40–50% Chapple: 30–40% 40–50%
U.S. senator before election
Robert La Follette Jr.
Republican
Elected U.S. Senator
Robert La Follette Jr.
Progressive

The 1934 United States Senate election in Wisconsin was held on November 6, 1934.

Incumbent Republican U.S. Senator Robert La Follette Jr. left his party and, with his brother Philip, formed the new Wisconsin Progressive Party. La Follette was re-elected on the Progressive ticket over Democrat John M. Callahan and Republican John B. Chapple. Robert La Follette Jr. was the first non-Republican to have won an election for this seat to the United States Senate from Wisconsin since John Lendrum Mitchell in 1893.

== Progressive primary ==
=== Candidates ===
- Robert M. La Follette Jr., incumbent senator since 1925

=== Results ===
1934 Progressive U.S. Senate primary
Party	Candidate	Votes	%
Progressive	Robert M. La Follette Jr. (incumbent)	154,373	100.00%
Total votes		154,373	100.00%

== Republican primary ==
=== Candidates ===
- John B. Chapple, nominee for U.S. Senate in 1932

=== Results ===
1934 Republican U.S. Senate primary
Party	Candidate	Votes	%
Republican	John B. Chapple	126,034	100.00%
Total votes		126,034	100.00%

== Democratic primary ==
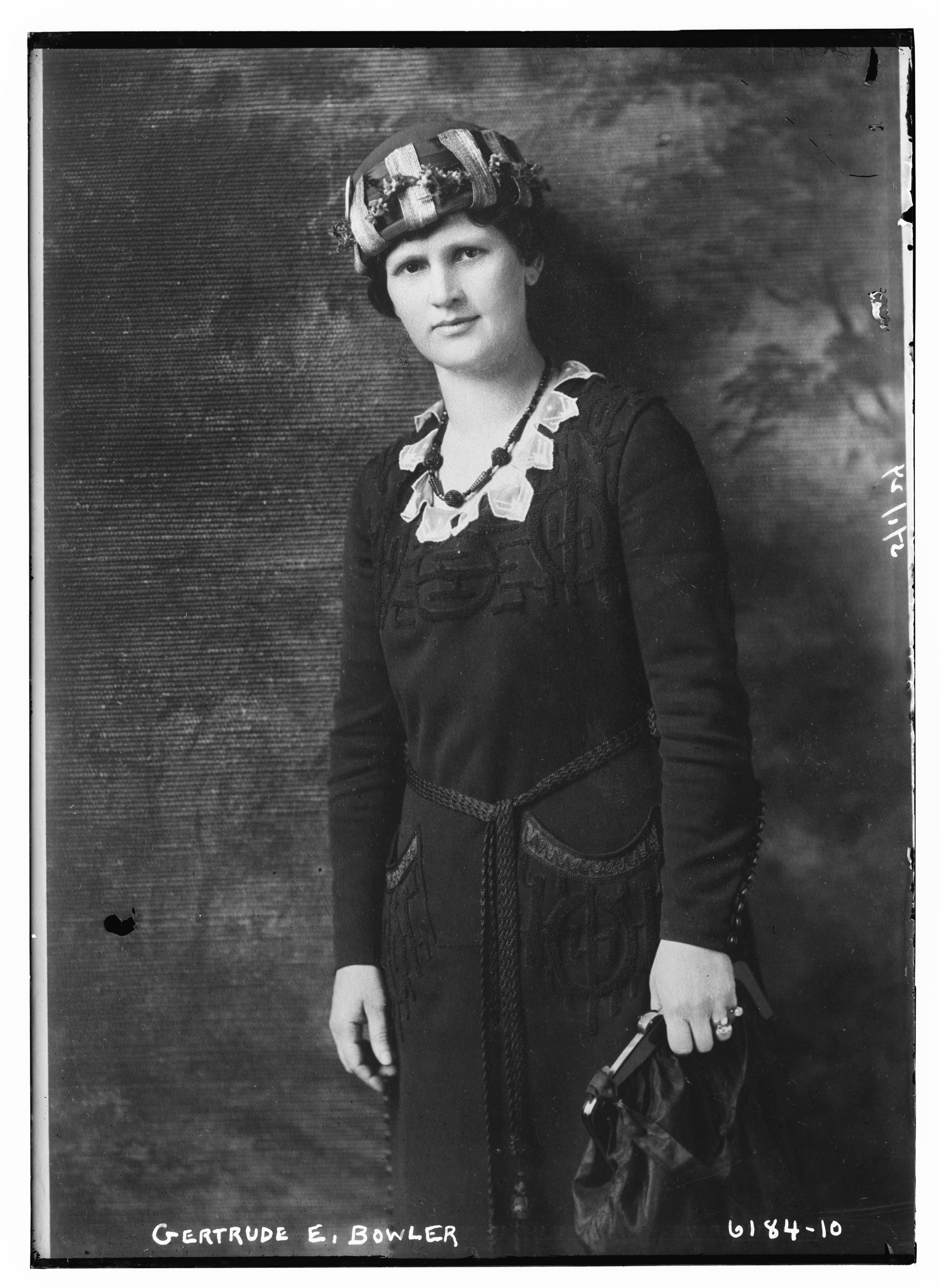
Gertrude Bowler in 1924

=== Candidates ===
- Gertrude Bowler, Democratic Party activist and anti-Prohibitionist
- John M. Callahan, former Wisconsin Democratic Party chairman (1925–1927) and nominee for Wisconsin Secretary of State in 1910 and 1924
- William D. Carroll, state senator from Prairie du Chien
- Charles E. Hammersley, candidate for governor in 1930
- Francis E. McGovern, former governor of Wisconsin (1911–15)

=== Results ===
1934 Democratic U.S. Senate primary
Party	Candidate	Votes	%
Democratic	John M. Callahan	58,270	29.06%
Democratic	Francis E. McGovern	48,931	24.41%
Democratic	Charles E. Hammersley	38,369	19.14%
Democratic	William D. Carroll	29,137	14.53%
Democratic	Gertrude Bowler	25,785	12.86%
Total votes		200,492	100.00%

== General election ==
=== Candidates ===
- John B. Chapple, candidate for U.S. Senate in 1932 (Republican)
- John M. Callahan, former Wisconsin Democratic Party chairman (Democratic)
- Fern Dobbins (Independent Communist)
- Robert M. La Follette Jr., incumbent senator since 1925 (Progressive)
- Theodore Lee (Independent Prohibition)
- James P. Sheehan, Milwaukee County supervisor (Social-Democratic)

=== Results ===
1934 U.S. Senate election in Wisconsin
Party	Candidate	Votes	%	±%
Progressive	Robert La Follette Jr. (incumbent)	440,513	47.78%	N/A
Democratic	John M. Callahan	223,438	24.24%	N/A
Republican	John B. Chapple	210,569	22.84%	▼62.73
Social-Democratic	James P. Sheehan	44,453	4.82%	N/A
Communist	Fern Dobbins	2,127	0.23%	▲0.03
Prohibition	Theodore Lee	826	0.09%	▼2.79
Write-in		23	0.00%	N/A
Total votes		921,949	100.00%	
Progressive gain from Republican				

== See also ==
- 1934 United States Senate elections
