= Judge McMahon =

Judge McMahon may refer to:

- Colleen McMahon (born 1951), judge of the United States District Court for the Southern District of New York
- Stephen J. McMahon (1881–1960), judge of the United States Tax Court
