= Andrew P. Kealy =

American politician

Andrew P. Kealy was a member of the Wisconsin State Assembly.

== Biography ==
Kealy was born on January 29, 1861, in Pittsburgh, Pennsylvania. He moved with his parents to Pleasant Valley, St. Croix County, Wisconsin, in 1870. In 1891, he bought a farm in Hammond (town), Wisconsin. Kealy died in 1917.

== Political career ==
Kealy was elected to the assembly in 1910. Additionally, he was a supervisor of Pleasant Valley, chairman of the board of supervisors of Hammond, chairman of the county board and Sheriff of St. Croix County, Wisconsin, and mayor of Hudson, Wisconsin. In 1912, Kealy was a candidate for Secretary of State of Wisconsin. He lost to John Donald. Kealy was a Democrat.

Party political offices
Preceded by John M. Callahan	Democratic nominee for Secretary of State of Wisconsin; 1912	Succeeded by Henry C. Truesdell
