= James P. Sheehan =

American socialist politician (circa 1866–1936)

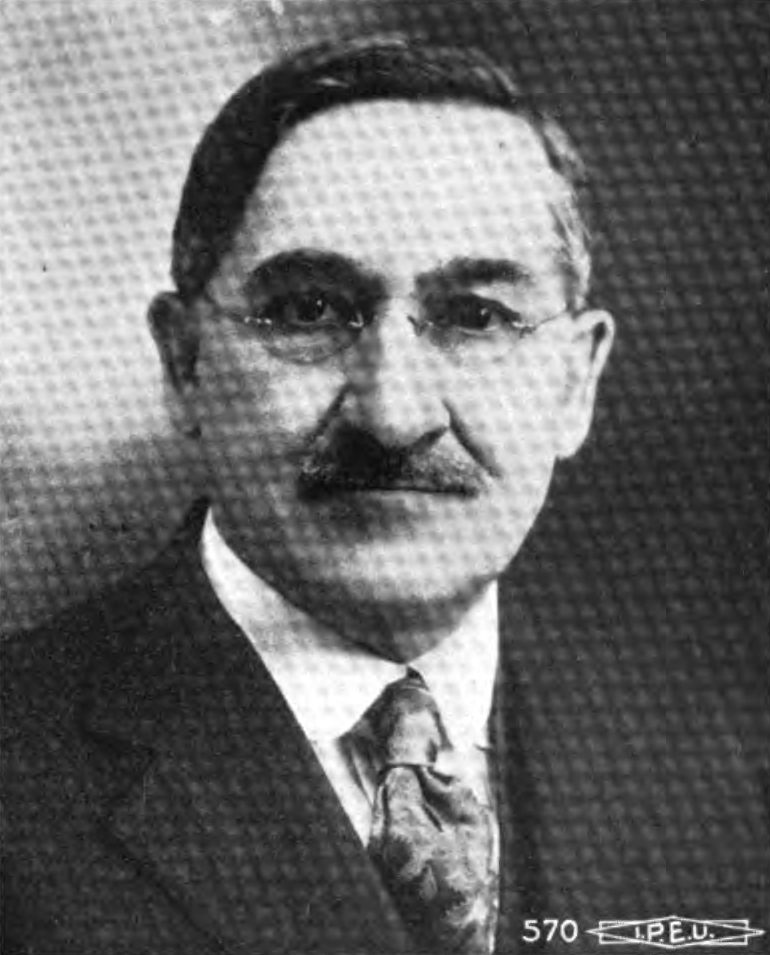
- Sheehan c. 1924

Chairman of the Milwaukee County Board of Supervisors
- In office 1910–1912

Member of the Milwaukee County Board of Supervisors
- In office 1914–1936
- In office 1908–1912
- In office 1904–1906

Personal details
- Born: March 12, 1866 Lockport, New York, U.S.
- Died: November 26, 1936 (aged 70) Milwaukee, Wisconsin, U.S.
- Party: Socialist
- Spouse: Lena (m. 1888; died 1934)
- Children: 3
- Occupation: Cigar maker

James Patrick Sheehan (March 12, 1866 – November 26, 1936) was an American cigar maker, labor leader and politician who served several terms on the Milwaukee County Board of Supervisors and was its chairman from 1910 to 1912. He was the Socialist candidate for Congress in Wisconsin's 5th district in 1930 and for Senate in 1934.

Outside of electoral politics, Sheehan was general organizer for the Milwaukee Federated Trades Council, a vice president of the Cigar Makers' International Union, and a member of the executive board of the Wisconsin State Federation of Labor.
