= Forest D. Siefkin =

American judge (1891–1964)

Forest D. Siefkin (1891 – January 30, 1964) was a judge of the United States Board of Tax Appeals (later the United States Tax Court) from 1927 to 1929.

Prior to his appointment, Siefkin was an attorney with the firm of Long, Houston, Cowan and Depew. In 1923, he joined the trial division of the International Revenue Department, appearing in the Federal courts regularly as the special representative of the Government in income tax matters which have become involved in litigation. His a brother George Siefkin was an assistant city attorney. Appointed to the Tax Court by President Calvin Coolidge, Siefkin served for two years, after which he resigned, and was succeeded by Stephen J. McMahon.

After leaving the Tax Court, he served as president of the village of Glencoe, Illinois, from 1935 to 1940, and as vice president, general counsel, and director of International Harvester. He retired from his executive positions with the company in 1957, and as a director in 1959.

Siefkin died at Presbyterian-St. Luke's hospital in Glencoe at the age of 72.
