= Alexander Wiley =

American politician (1884–1967)

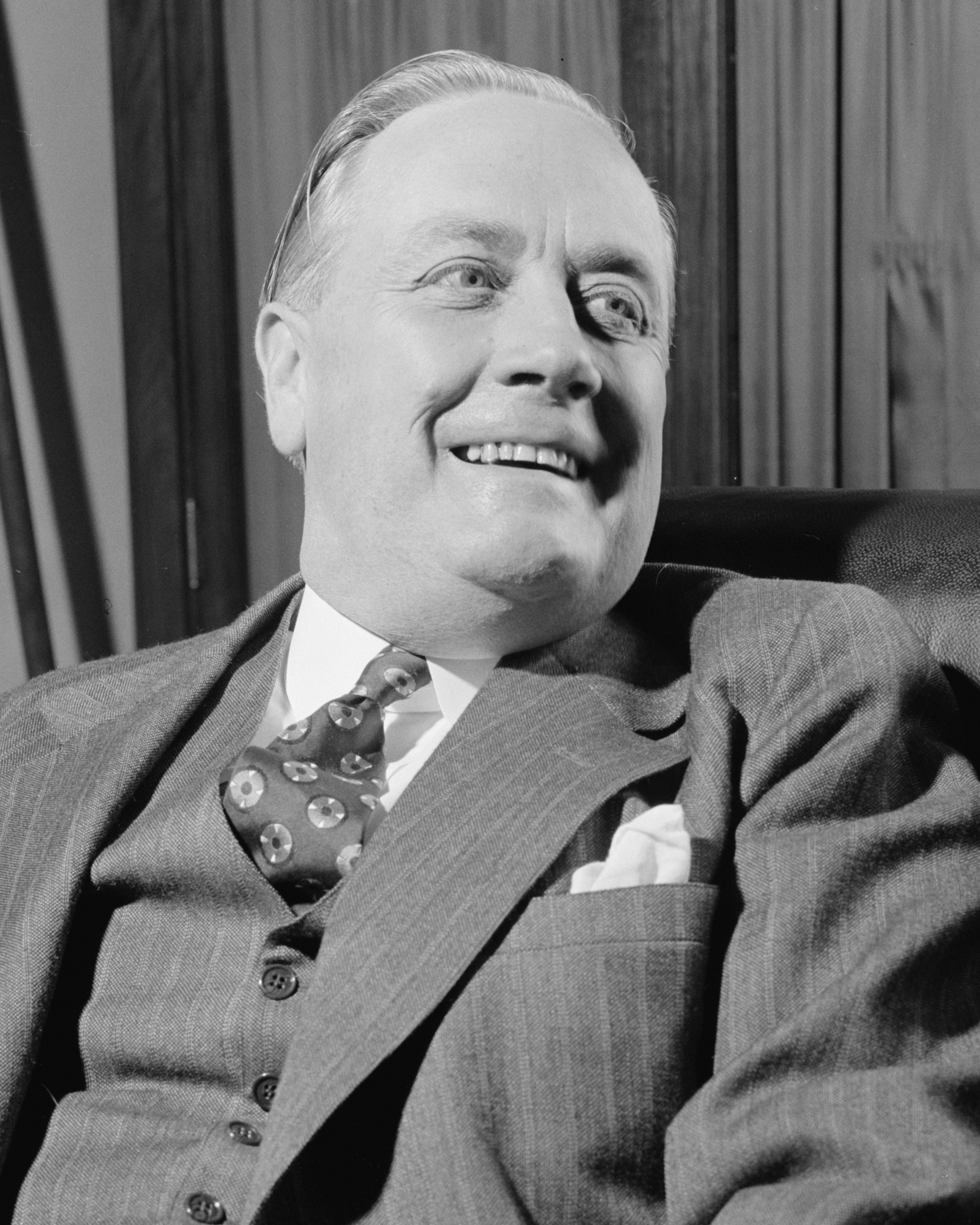
- Wiley in April 1939

United States Senator from Wisconsin
- In office January 3, 1939 – January 3, 1963
- Preceded by: F. Ryan Duffy
- Succeeded by: Gaylord Nelson
Senate positions
Chair of the Senate Foreign Relations Committee
In office January 3, 1953 – January 3, 1955
Preceded by	Tom Connally
Succeeded by	Walter F. George
Chair of the Senate Judiciary Committee
In office January 3, 1947 – January 3, 1949
Preceded by	Pat McCarran
Succeeded by	Pat McCarran

Personal details
- Born: May 26, 1884 Chippewa Falls, Wisconsin, U.S.
- Died: October 26, 1967 (aged 83) Germantown, Pennsylvania, U.S.
- Resting place: Forest Hill Cemetery, Chippewa Falls
- Party: Republican
- Education: University of Michigan; University of Wisconsin Law School
- Occupation: Attorney, Politician

Alexander Wiley (May 26, 1884 – October 26, 1967) was an American lawyer and Republican politician from Chippewa Falls, Wisconsin. He served four terms as United States senator from Wisconsin, from 1939 to 1963, and was the most senior Republican member of the Senate during his final term. With his longevity in the U.S. Senate, Wiley held many notable positions, including chairing the Senate Judiciary Committee (1947–1949) and Senate Foreign Relations Committee (1953–1955), and serving as the leading Republican on the Foreign Relations Committee from 1951 through 1963.

Before his election to the U.S. Senate, he was the Republican nominee for governor of Wisconsin in 1936, losing to progressive candidate Philip La Follette. He also served six years as district attorney of Chippewa County (1909–1915).

== Biography ==
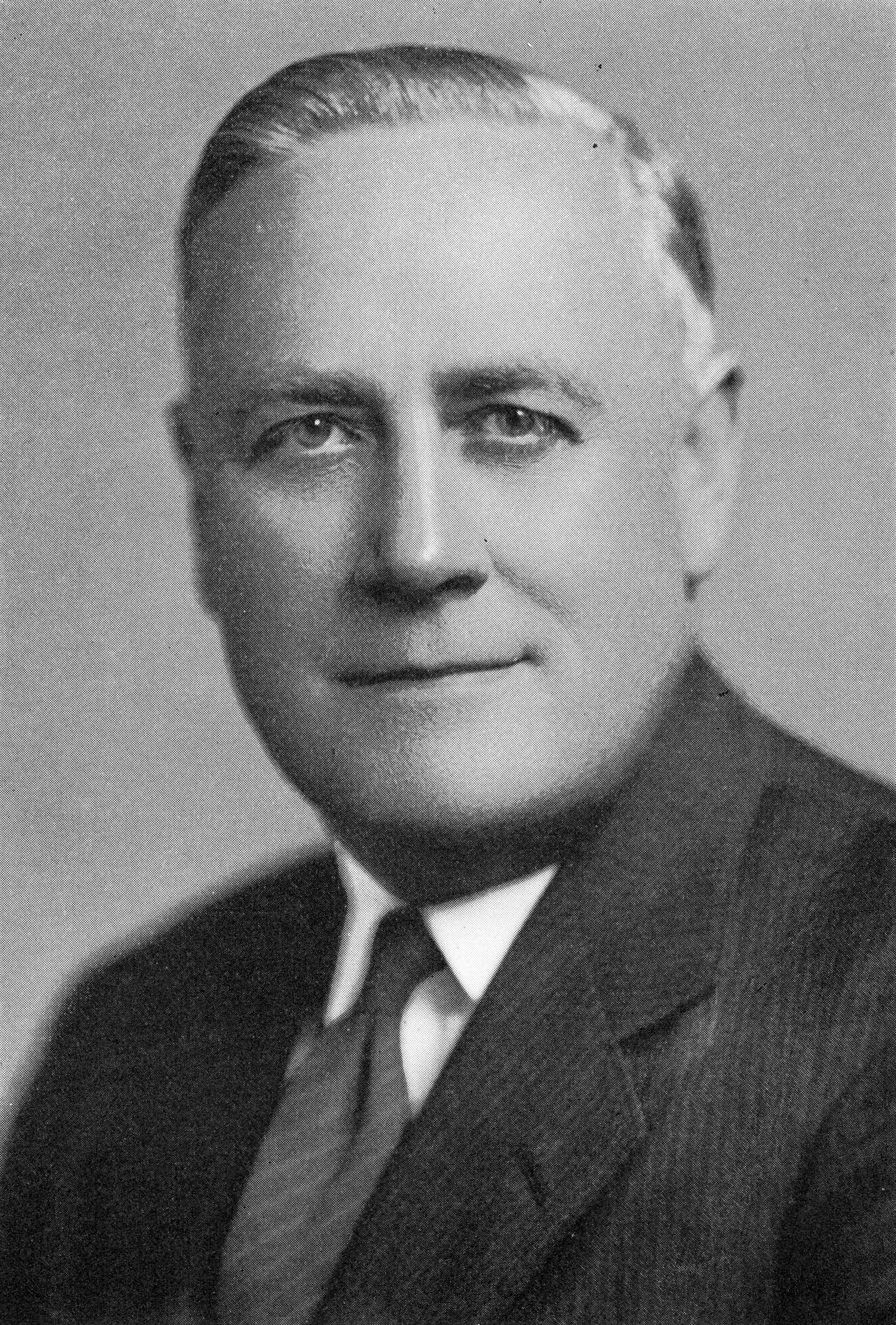
Wiley in 1940

Wiley was born in Chippewa Falls, Wisconsin. He received his undergraduate education at Augsburg College in Minnesota and the University of Michigan in Ann Arbor, Michigan. He received his law degree from the University of Wisconsin–Madison in 1907 and was also admitted to the bar the same year. He served as the Chippewa County district attorney from 1909 to 1915.

Wiley was the Republican candidate for governor of Wisconsin in 1936, but his bid failed. Philip La Follette and the new Wisconsin Progressive Party, which split from the Republicans in 1934, won the election. In 1938, Wiley was elected to the U.S. Senate, first defeating Tax Court judge Stephen J. McMahon to win the Republican nomination, and then defeating Democratic incumbent F. Ryan Duffy to win the seat. In 1944, Wiley was challenged by United States Marine Corps Captain Joseph R. McCarthy in the Republican primary. He defeated McCarthy and won the general election. Wiley, then an isolationist in foreign policy, and Governor Walter S. Goodland supported Republican presidential nominee Thomas E. Dewey in the 1944 race over incumbent Franklin D. Roosevelt, and Dewey won Wisconsin's electoral votes but fell short nationally.

Wiley was re-elected two more times, in 1950 and 1956. He was challenged by U.S. Representative Glenn Robert Davis in the 1956 Republican primary, but again prevailed. Wiley voted in favor of the Civil Rights Acts of 1957 and 1960, as well as the 24th Amendment to the U.S. Constitution. In 1962, Wiley lost his bid for a fifth term to Governor Gaylord Nelson, a liberal Democrat. Wiley was the last Republican to serve as a U.S. Senator from Wisconsin until former 9th district congressman Bob Kasten took office in 1981.

Wiley had a distinguished Senate career that included the chairmanship of both the Foreign Relations and Judiciary committees.

Wiley died in Germantown, Pennsylvania at age 83. He was interred at Forest Hill Cemetery in Chippewa Falls. During his lifetime he was a member of the Freemasons, the Knights Templar, the Elks Club, the Kiwanis, the Knights of Pythias, the Moose International, the Sons of Norway, and Sigma Phi Epsilon.

== Notes ==
Party political offices
Preceded by Howard Greene	Republican nominee for Governor of Wisconsin; 1936	Succeeded by Julius P. Heil
Preceded by John B. Chapple	Republican nominee for U.S. Senator from Wisconsin (Class 3); 1938, 1944, 1950, 1956, 1962	Succeeded by Jerris Leonard
U.S. Senate
Preceded by F. Ryan Duffy	U.S. senator (Class 3) from Wisconsin; 1939–1963; Served alongside: Robert M. La Follette, Jr., Joseph McCarthy, William Proxmire	Succeeded by Gaylord A. Nelson
Preceded by Pat McCarran	Chair of the Senate Judiciary Committee; 1947–1949	Succeeded by Pat McCarran
Preceded by Pat McCarran	Ranking Member of the Senate Judiciary Committee; 1949–1953	Succeeded by Pat McCarran
Preceded by Arthur Vandenberg	Ranking Member of the Senate Foreign Relations Committee; 1951–1953	Succeeded by Walter F. George
Preceded by Tom Connally	Chair of the Senate Foreign Relations Committee; 1953–1955	Succeeded by Walter F. George
Preceded by Walter F. George	Ranking Member of the Senate Foreign Relations Committee; 1955–1963	Succeeded by Bourke B. Hickenlooper
Preceded by Pat McCarran	Ranking Member of the Senate Judiciary Committee; 1955–1963	Succeeded by Everett Dirksen
Preceded by Styles Bridges	Ranking Member of the Senate Space Committee; 1961–1963	Succeeded by Margaret Chase Smith
Honorary titles
Preceded by Styles Bridges	Most senior Republican United States senator 1961–1963	Succeeded by George Aiken
