= Ferdinand August Geiger =

American judge (1867–1939)

Judge of the United States District Court for the Eastern District of Wisconsin
- In office March 20, 1912 – May 22, 1939
- Appointed by: William Howard Taft
- Preceded by: Joseph V. Quarles
- Succeeded by: F. Ryan Duffy

Personal details
- Born: Ferdinand August Geiger; October 15, 1867 Cassville, Wisconsin
- Died: July 31, 1939 (aged 71)
- Resting place: Cassville, Wisconsin

Ferdinand August Geiger (October 15, 1867 – July 31, 1939) was a United States district judge of the United States District Court for the Eastern District of Wisconsin.

== Education and career ==
Born in Cassville, Wisconsin, Geiger was in private practice in Milwaukee, Wisconsin from 1888 to 1912.

== Federal judicial service ==
On February 19, 1912, Geiger was nominated by President William Howard Taft to a seat on the United States District Court for the Eastern District of Wisconsin vacated by Judge Joseph V. Quarles. Geiger was confirmed by the United States Senate on March 20, 1912, and received his commission the same day. Geiger served in that capacity until his retirement on May 22, 1939, due to poor health. He died on July 31, 1939, and was buried in Cassville.

== Sources ==
Legal offices
Preceded by Joseph V. Quarles	Judge of the United States District Court for the Eastern District of Wisconsin; 1912–1939	Succeeded by F. Ryan Duffy
