= John M. Callahan =

American politician

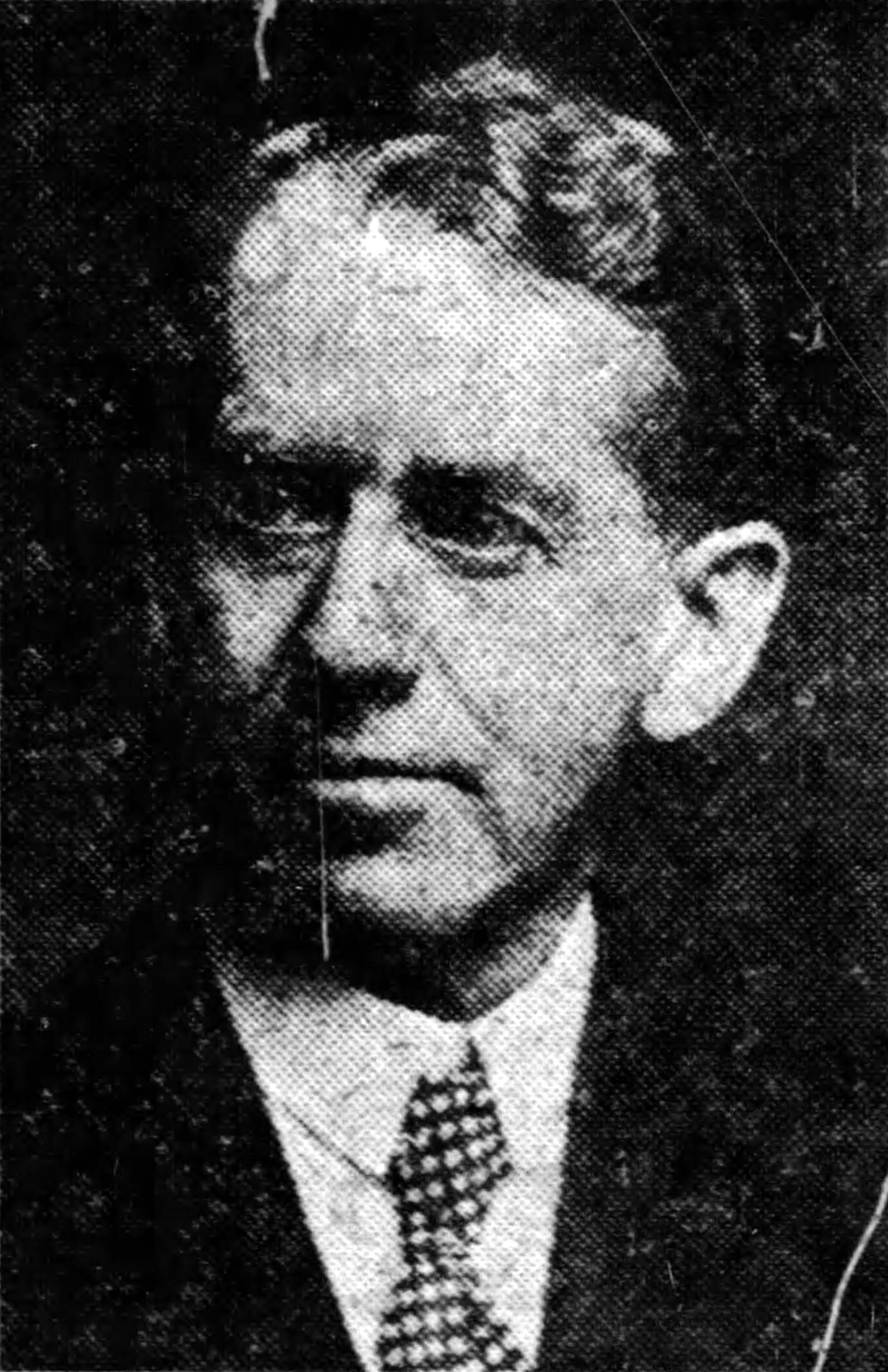
- Callahan c. 1919

Chair of the Democratic Party of Wisconsin
- In office 1925–1927

Personal details
- Resting place: Holy Cross Cemetery, Milwaukee, Wisconsin, U.S.
- Occupation: Politician

John M. Callahan was an American politician who served as chairman of the Democratic Party of Wisconsin from 1925 to 1927.

== Career ==
Callahan was chaired the Democratic Party of Wisconsin from 1925 to 1927. He was twice a candidate for Secretary of State of Wisconsin. In 1910, he lost to incumbent and future U.S. Representative James A. Frear and in 1924, he lost to incumbent a future Governor of Wisconsin Fred R. Zimmerman. Callahan was a delegate to the 1924 Democratic National Convention. At the convention, his name was put into play for the Democratic Party's nominee for President of the United States. The nomination eventually went to John W. Davis, who lost to incumbent Calvin Coolidge in the general election. Callahan was also a delegate to the 1928 Democratic National Convention. In 1934, he was a candidate for the United States Senate, losing to incumbent Robert M. La Follette Jr.

Party political offices
Preceded by Frank B. Schutz	Democratic nominee for Secretary of State of Wisconsin; 1910	Succeeded by Andrew P. Kealy
Preceded by Peter S. Brzonkala	Democratic nominee for Secretary of State of Wisconsin; 1924	Succeeded by Albert C. Wolfe
Preceded by M.K. Reilly	Democratic nominee for U.S. Senator from Wisconsin (Class 1); 1934	Succeeded by James E. Finnegan
