= John B. Chapple =

American politician (1899–1989)

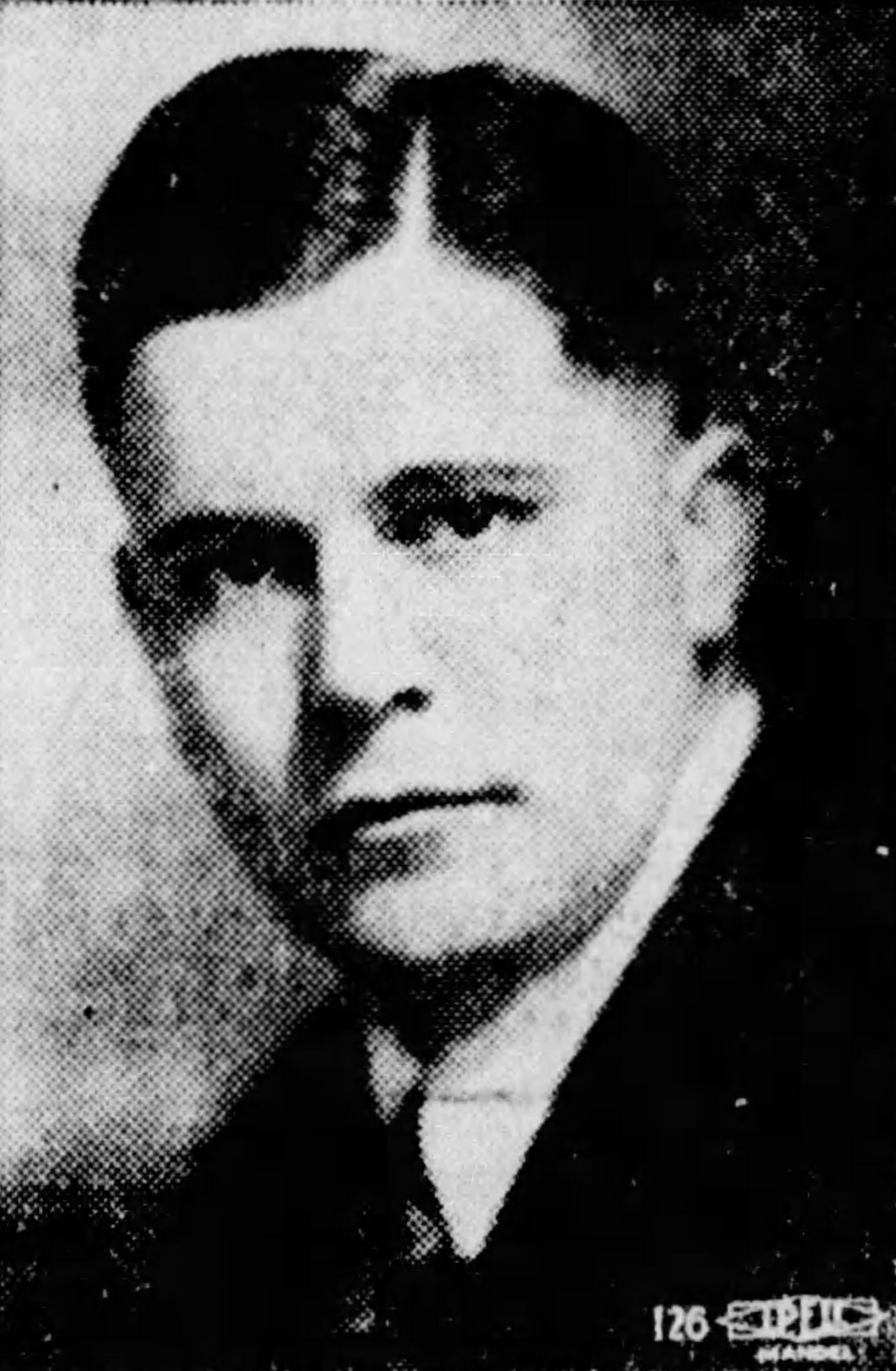
Chapple c. 1932

John Bowman Chapple (November 20, 1899 – April 16, 1989) was an American newspaper publisher and politician from Wisconsin. In 1932, he unseated incumbent United States Senator John J. Blaine in the Republican primary.

== Early life and education ==
John Bowman Chapple was born on November 20, 1899. His father had moved to northern Wisconsin at the age of 11 and worked as a printer's devil on a small newspaper. In 1888, his family acquired control of the Ashland Daily Press.

Chapple attended public schools and spent one year at the University of Wisconsin before serving as a second lieutenant during World War I. He was not deployed to Europe but was assigned to instruction at the University of Kansas. After the war ended, he traveled to Chicago, where he briefly worked as a journalist before moving to Janesville and then Milwaukee, where he worked as a police reporter for the Milwaukee Journal for four months.

Chapple left the Journal to attend Yale University, where he studied economics under Professor Irving Fisher and played jazz to earn money for tuition. After meeting his wife, Irene Mary McDonnell, he left Yale and moved to Boston, where he worked for his uncle, a magazine publisher.

In 1922, Chapple's father was appointed postmaster for Ashland by President Warren G. Harding. He returned to Ashland to run the Press until his brother Joe graduated from Princeton University. Returning to Yale, he studied socialism and the Russian Revolution before graduating in 1924. In 1926, he took a solo trip through Europe, where he became disillusioned with socialism and internationalism. In Moscow, he claimed to meet and interview Bill Haywood. Chapple later claimed Haywood had failed at working in a Russian coal mine and had "gone art," ignoring Chapple's questions about the spread of communist revolution to focus on his collection of Russian woven fabrics.

== Political career ==
Chapple entered politics in February 1931, when he traveled to Madison to protest tax increases sponsored by Governor Philip La Follette.

In 1932, Chapple defeated incumbent John J. Blaine in the Republican primary for the United States Senate. His campaign included the claim that the University of Wisconsin was rife with atheism, communism, and immorality. Chapple lost in the general election to F. Ryan Duffy.

He ran for the Senate twice more. In 1934, he finished third behind incumbent Robert M. La Follette Jr. and John M. Callahan.

In 1936, Chapple was a candidate for the Republican primary for Governor of Wisconsin. He lost to Alexander Wiley, who went on to lose to incumbent Philip La Follette in the general election. Chapple ran for the United States Senate in 1938, but again lost the Republican primary to Wiley. He ran in the general election as a "Townsend Republican."

Chapple's name was put into play in Wisconsin as a favorite son candidate for the Republican nomination for President of the United States in 1956 after William Knowland withdrew from the race, but ultimately, incumbent Dwight D. Eisenhower retained the nomination and won re-election. In 1960, Chapple was a write-in candidate for the United States House of Representatives from Wisconsin's 10th congressional district, garnering 4.7% of the vote. He lost to Republican incumbent Alvin E. O'Konski.

Party political offices
Preceded by John J. Blaine	Republican nominee for U.S. Senator from Wisconsin (Class 3); 1932	Succeeded by Alexander Wiley
Preceded by Robert M. La Follette Jr.	Republican nominee for U.S. Senator from Wisconsin (Class 1); 1934	Succeeded by Fred H. Clausen
