= 1932 United States Senate election in Wisconsin =

- November 8, 1932
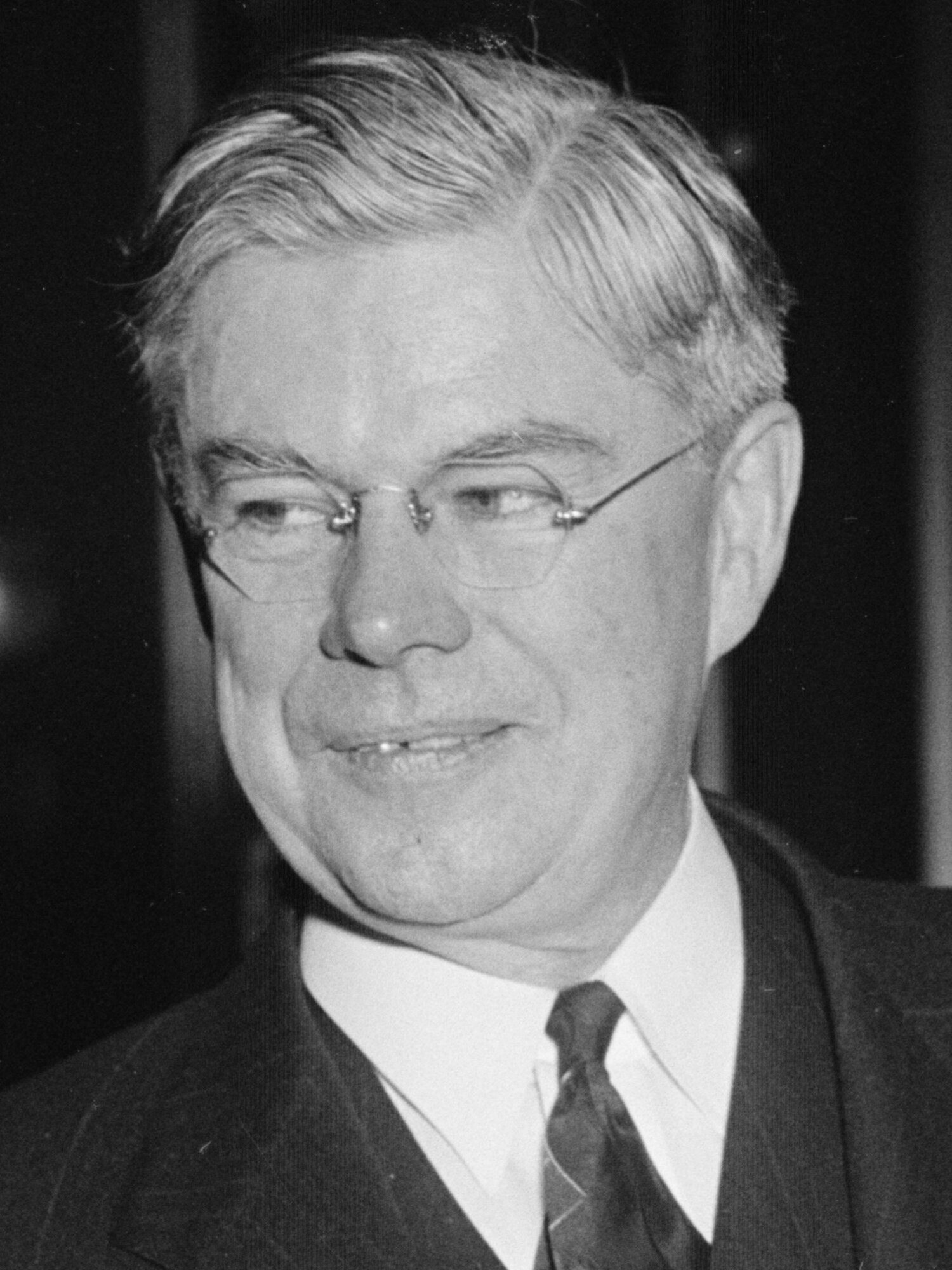

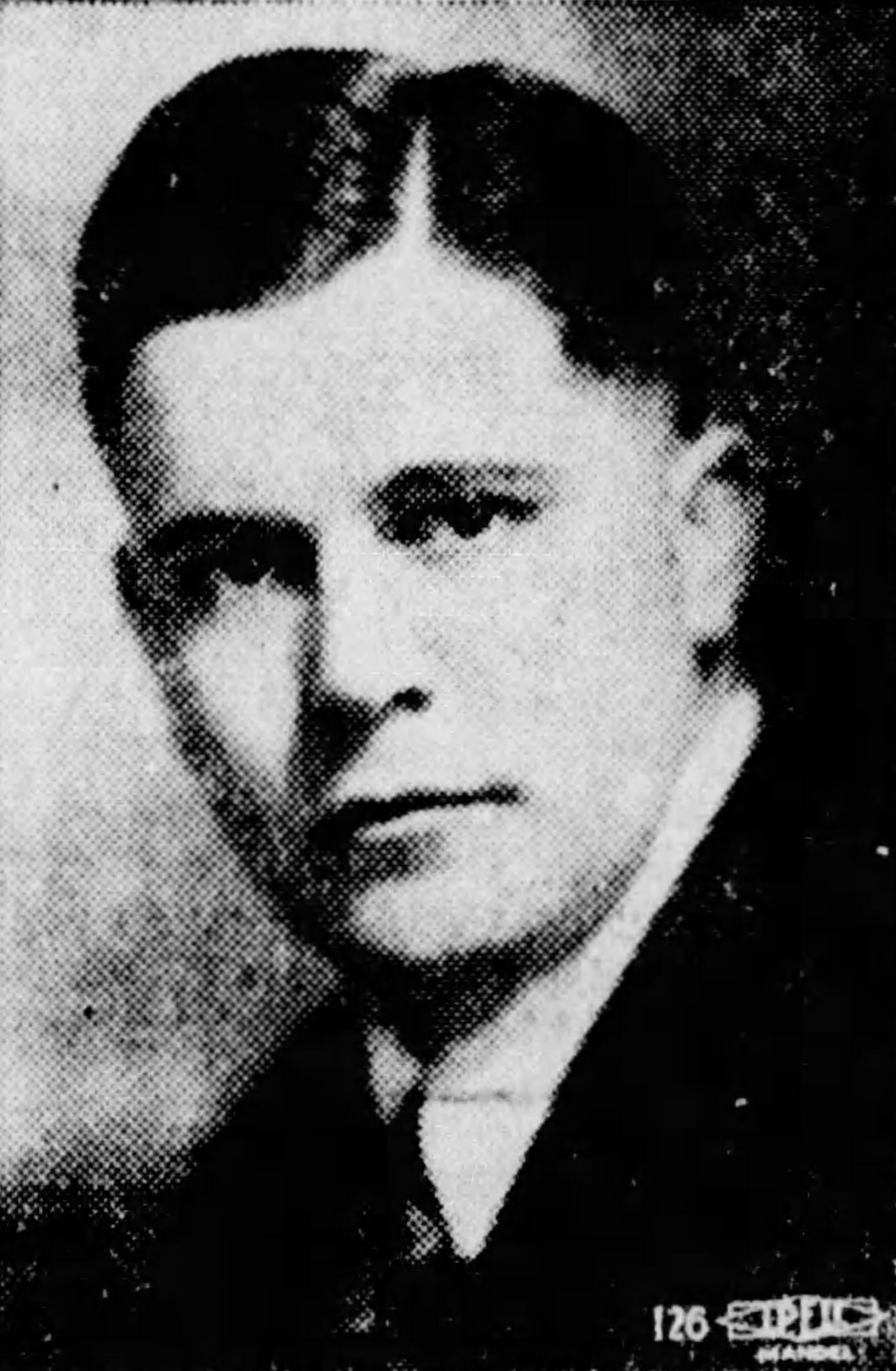

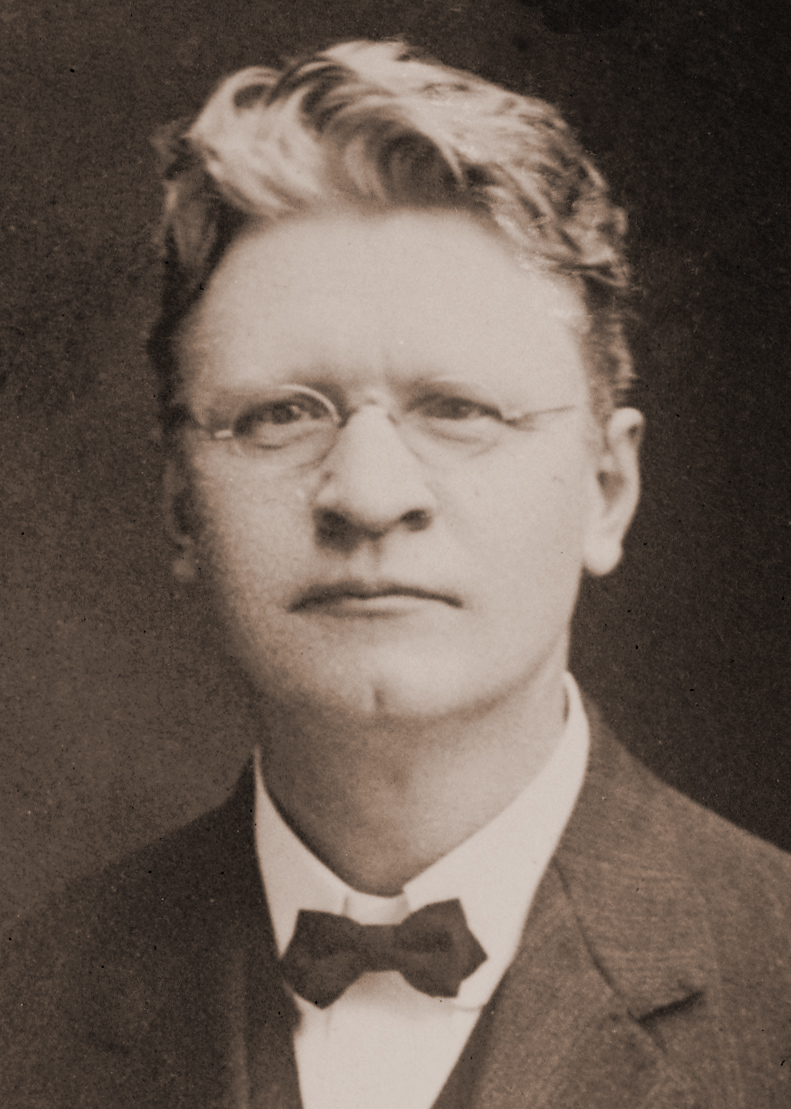
Nominee	F. Ryan Duffy	John B. Chapple	Emil Seidel
Party	Democratic	Republican	Social-Democratic
Popular vote	610,236	387,668	65,807
Percentage	56.98%	36.20%	6.14%
- County results Duffy: 50–60% 60–70% 70–80% Chapple: 40–50% 50–60% 60–70%
U.S. senator before election
John J. Blaine
Republican
Elected U.S. Senator
F. Ryan Duffy
Democratic

The 1932 United States Senate election in Wisconsin was held on November 8, 1932. Incumbent Republican U.S. Senator John J. Blaine ran for a second term in office but lost the Republican primary to John B. Chapple. In the general election, Chapple was defeated by F. Ryan Duffy.

== Republican primary ==
=== Candidates ===
- John J. Blaine, incumbent Senator since 1927 and former Governor
- John B. Chapple, editor of the Ashland Daily Press

=== Results ===
1932 U.S. Senate Republican primary
Party	Candidate	Votes	%
Republican	John B. Chapple	348,991	50.80%
Republican	John J. Blaine (incumbent)	338,042	49.20%
Total votes		687,033	100.00%

== Other primaries ==
=== Democratic ===
1932 U.S. Senate Democratic primary
Party	Candidate	Votes	%
Democratic	F. Ryan Duffy	110,548	100.00%
Total votes		110,548	100.00%

=== Prohibition ===
1932 U.S. Senate Prohibition primary
Party	Candidate	Votes	%
Prohibition	Harvey A. Knapp	686	60.1%
Prohibition	Meisel	455	39.9%
Total votes		1,141	100.00%

=== Social-Democratic ===
1932 U.S. Senate Social-Democratic primary
Party	Candidate	Votes	%
Social-Democratic	Emil Seidel	31,387	100.00%
Total votes		31,387	100.00%

== General election ==
=== Candidates ===
- John B. Chapple, editor of the Ashland Daily Press (Republican)
- F. Ryan Duffy, attorney from Fond du Lac (Democratic)
- Ray Hansbrough (Communist)
- Harvey A. Knapp (Prohibition)
- Emil Seidel, former mayor of Milwaukee (Social-Democratic)

=== Results ===
1932 U.S. Senate election in Wisconsin
Party	Candidate	Votes	%	±%
Democratic	F. Ryan Duffy	610,236	56.98%	
Republican	John B. Chapple	387,668	36.20%	
Social-Democratic	Emil Seidel	65,807	6.14%	
Prohibition	Harvey A. Knapp	4,364	0.41%	
Communist	Rayn Hasnbrough	2,921	0.27%	
Democratic gain from Republican		Swing		

== See also ==
- 1932 United States Senate elections
