= F. Ryan Duffy =

American judge and politician (1888–1979)

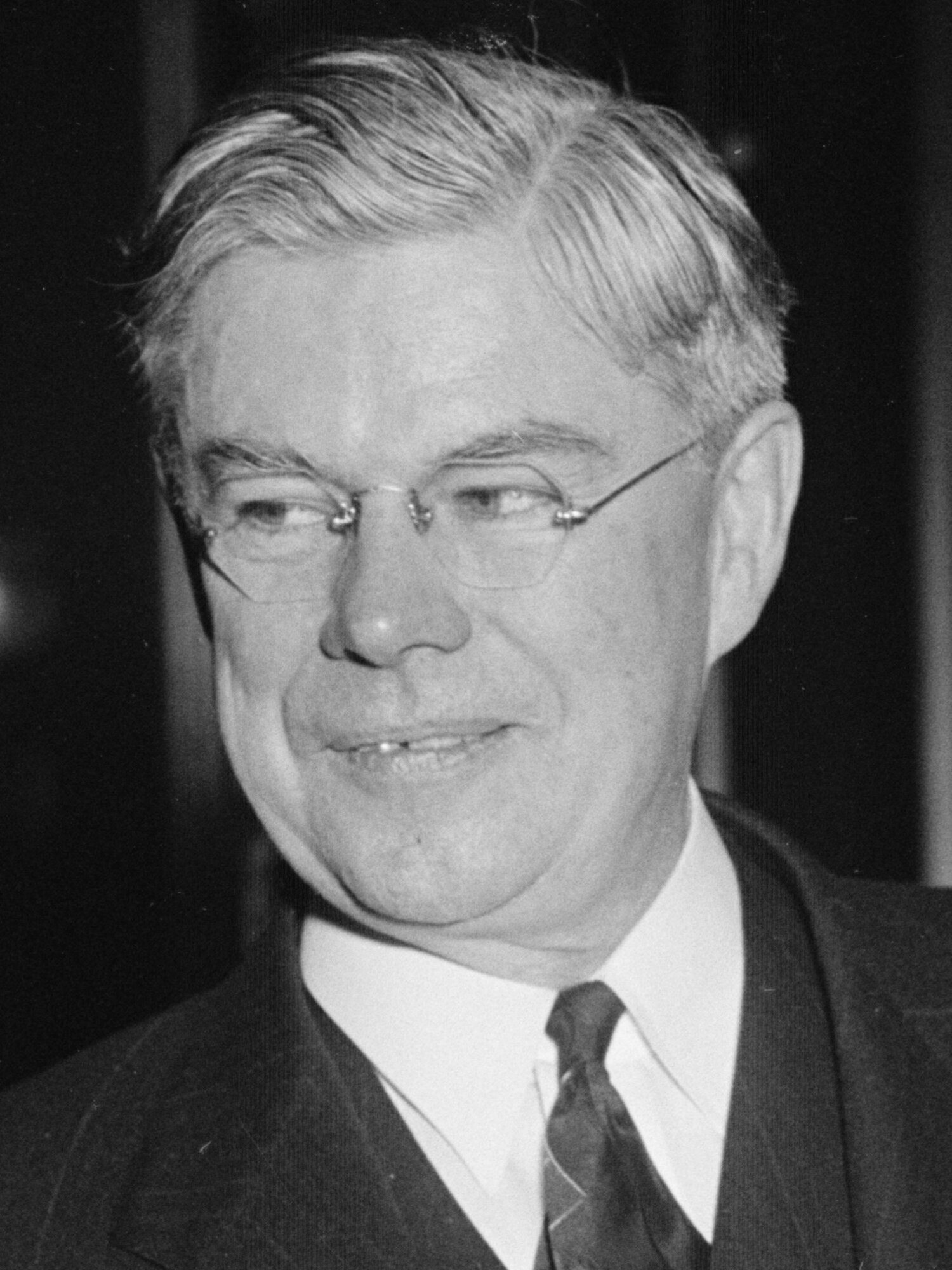
- Duffy in 1938

Senior Judge of the United States Court of Appeals for the Seventh Circuit
- In office June 30, 1966 – August 16, 1979

Chief Judge of the United States Court of Appeals for the Seventh Circuit
- In office September 1, 1954 – August 6, 1959
- Preceded by: James Earl Major
- Succeeded by: John Simpson Hastings

Judge of the United States Court of Appeals for the Seventh Circuit
- In office February 2, 1949 – June 30, 1966
- Appointed by: Harry S. Truman
- Preceded by: Evan Alfred Evans
- Succeeded by: Thomas E. Fairchild

United States District Judge for the Eastern District of Wisconsin
- In office June 29, 1939 – February 2, 1949
- Appointed by: Franklin D. Roosevelt
- Preceded by: Ferdinand August Geiger
- Succeeded by: Robert Emmet Tehan

United States Senator from Wisconsin
- In office March 4, 1933 – January 3, 1939
- Preceded by: John J. Blaine
- Succeeded by: Alexander Wiley

Personal details
- Born: Francis Ryan Duffy; June 23, 1888 Fond du Lac, Wisconsin, U.S.
- Died: August 16, 1979 (aged 91) Milwaukee, Wisconsin, U.S.
- Resting place: Calvary Cemetery and Mausoleum, Fond du Lac
- Party: Democratic
- Spouse: Ann Louise Haydon
- Education: University of Wisconsin–Madison (BA); University of Wisconsin Law School (LLB)
- Profession: Lawyer

Francis Ryan Duffy (June 23, 1888 – August 16, 1979) was an American lawyer, politician, and jurist from Fond du Lac, Wisconsin. He served for the last 30 years of his life as a judge of the U.S. 7th Circuit Court of Appeals (1949–1979). He served as chief judge of the 7th Circuit from 1954 to 1959, and took senior judge status in 1966.

Before his service on the Court of Appeals, Duffy served one term as United States senator from Wisconsin, elected on the Democratic Party ticket and serving from 1933 to 1939. After he was defeated for re-election in the 1938 election, he was nominated to the United States District Court for the Eastern District of Wisconsin by President Franklin D. Roosevelt, and served for ten years in that role until his elevation to the Court of Appeals in 1949 by President Harry S. Truman.

== Education and career ==
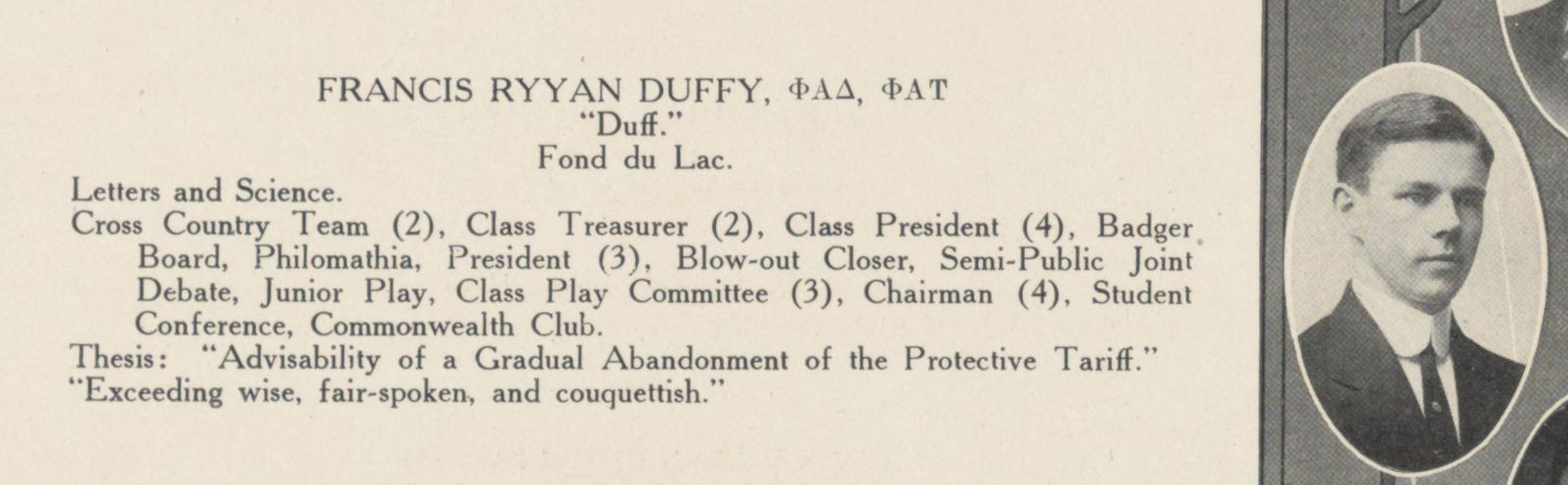
Duffy in the University of Wisconsin–Madison yearbook, 1911

Born on June 23, 1888, in Fond du Lac, Fond du Lac County, Wisconsin, Duffy attended the public schools. He received a Bachelor of Arts degree in 1910 from the University of Wisconsin–Madison and a Bachelor of Laws in 1912 from the University of Wisconsin Law School and was admitted to the bar in 1912. He was in private practice of law in Fond du Lac from 1912 to 1917, from 1919 to 1933, and in 1939. He served in the United States Army during World War I from 1917 to 1919, attaining the rank of Major. He was United States Senator from Wisconsin from 1933 to 1939.

== Congressional service ==
Duffy was elected as a Democrat to the United States Senate and served from March 4, 1933, to January 3, 1939. He served during the 73rd, 74th and 75th United States Congresses. He was an unsuccessful candidate for reelection in 1938. Following his departure from the Senate, he briefly resumed the private practice of law.

== Federal judicial service ==
Duffy was nominated by President Franklin D. Roosevelt on June 21, 1939, to a seat on the United States District Court for the Eastern District of Wisconsin vacated by Judge Ferdinand August Geiger. He was confirmed by the United States Senate on June 26, 1939, and received his commission on June 29, 1939. His service terminated on February 2, 1949, due to his elevation to the Seventh Circuit.

Duffy was nominated by President Harry S. Truman on January 13, 1949, to a seat on the United States Court of Appeals for the Seventh Circuit vacated by Judge Evan Alfred Evans. He was confirmed by the Senate on January 31, 1949, and received his commission on February 2, 1949. He was sworn in on February 14, 1949. He served as Chief Judge and as a member of the Judicial Conference of the United States from 1954 to 1959. He assumed senior status on June 30, 1966. His service terminated upon his death.

== Death ==
Duffy died on August 16, 1979, in Milwaukee, Wisconsin. He is interred at Calvary Cemetery in Fond du Lac.

Party political offices
| Preceded by Thomas M. Kearney | Democratic nominee for U.S. Senator from Wisconsin (Class 3); 1932, 1938 | Succeeded by Howard J. McMurray |
U.S. Senate
| Preceded by John J. Blaine | U.S. Senator (Class 3) from Wisconsin; 1933–1939; Served alongside: Robert M. La Follette Jr. | Succeeded by Alexander Wiley |
Legal offices
| Preceded by Ferdinand August Geiger | United States District Judge for the Eastern District of Wisconsin; 1939–1949 | Succeeded by Robert Emmet Tehan |
| Preceded by Evan Alfred Evans | Judge of the United States Court of Appeals for the Seventh Circuit; 1949–1966 | Succeeded by Thomas E. Fairchild |
| Preceded by James Earl Major | Chief Judge of the United States Court of Appeals for the Seventh Circuit; 1954–1959 | Succeeded by John Simpson Hastings |
Honorary titles
| Preceded by Clarence Dill | Most senior living United States senator (Sitting or former); January 14, 1978 – August 16, 1979 | Succeeded by Elmer Austin Benson |
