= Robert M. La Follette Jr. =

American politician (1895–1953)

Bob La Follette
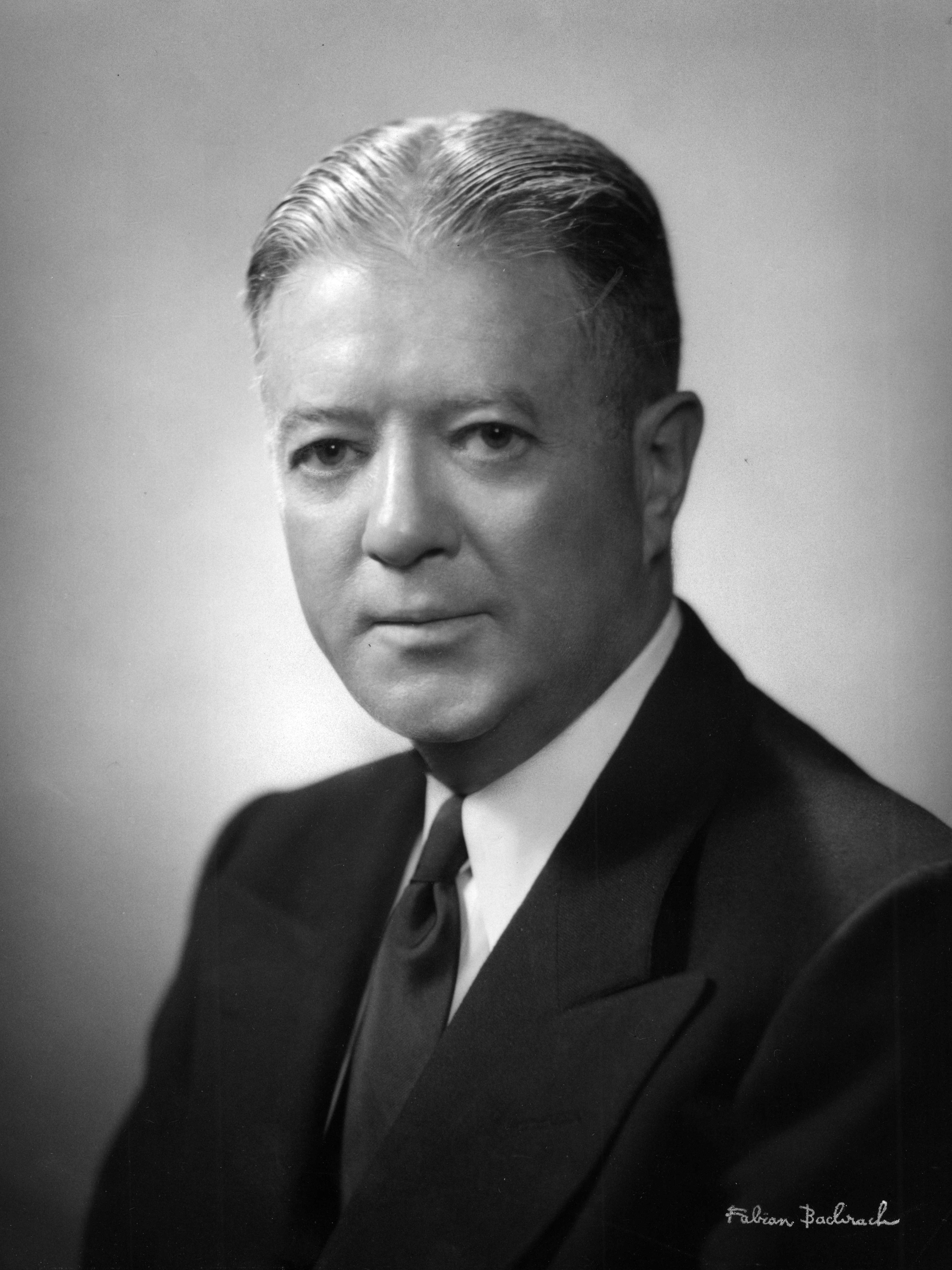
- Portrait by Fabian Bachrach c. 1940s

United States Senator from Wisconsin
- In office September 30, 1925 – January 3, 1947
- Preceded by: Robert M. La Follette
- Succeeded by: Joseph McCarthy

Personal details
- Born: Robert Marion La Follete Jr. February 6, 1895 Madison, Wisconsin, U.S.
- Died: February 24, 1953 (aged 58) Washington, D.C., U.S.
- Resting place: Forest Hill Cemetery
- Party: Republican (before 1934, 1946–1953); Wisconsin Progressive (1934–1946); National Progressives (1938–1946)
- Other political affiliations: America First Committee
- Spouse: Rachel Wilson Young (m. 1930)
- Children: 2, including Bronson
- Parents: Robert M. La Follette (father); Belle Case La Follette (mother)
- Relatives: Philip La Follette (brother); Fola La Follette (sister); La Follette family
- Education: University of Wisconsin, Madison (attended)

Robert Marion La Follette Jr. (February 6, 1895 – February 24, 1953) was an American politician who served as United States senator from Wisconsin from 1925 to 1947. A member of the La Follette family, he was often referred to by the nickname "Young Bob" to distinguish him from his father, Robert M. "Fighting Bob" La Follette, who had served as a U.S. senator and governor of Wisconsin. Robert Jr., along with his brother Philip La Follette, carried on their father's legacy of progressive politics and founded the Wisconsin Progressive Party. Robert Jr. was the last major Progressive Party politician in the U.S. Senate, ending in 1946 when the party disbanded. La Follette was defeated in the 1946 Republican Senate primary by Joseph McCarthy.

His son, Bronson La Follette was also a prominent politician in Wisconsin, serving as the 36th & 39th attorney general of Wisconsin.

== Background ==
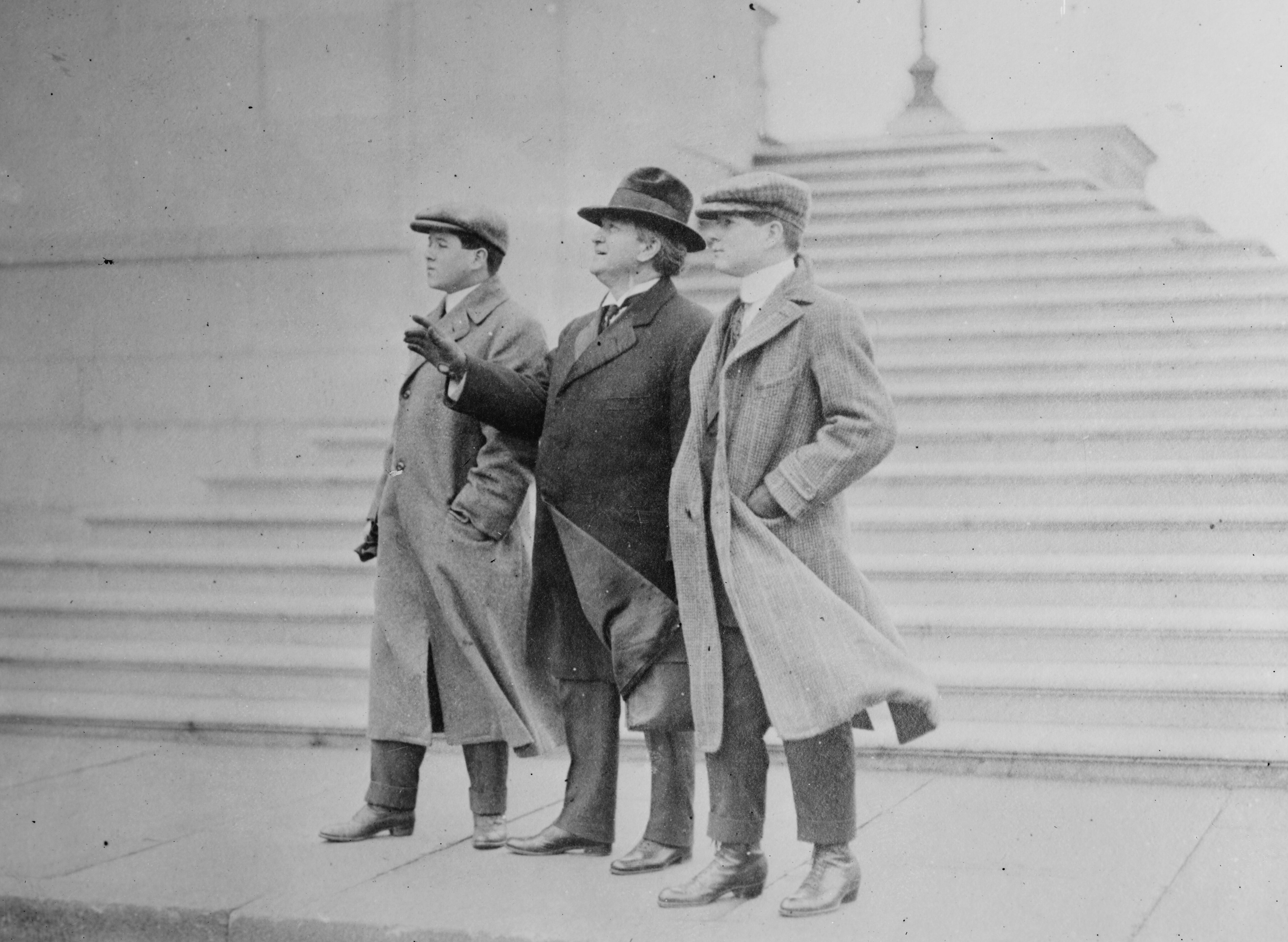
La Follette (left) with his brother Philip (right) and their father, Senator Robert M. La Follette, c. 1910s

Robert La Follette Jr. was born in Madison, Wisconsin, to Robert M. "Fighting Bob" La Follette and his wife Belle Case La Follette. He had three siblings, including Philip La Follette and Fola La Follette.

Robert Jr. attended the University of Wisconsin–Madison from 1913 to 1917 but he did not graduate because of a severe streptococcus infection. He received the honorary degree of LL.D. from the University of Wisconsin in 1938. The same illness kept him out of the military during World War I.

== Career ==
La Follette served as his father's private secretary between 1919 and 1925.

=== Republican ===
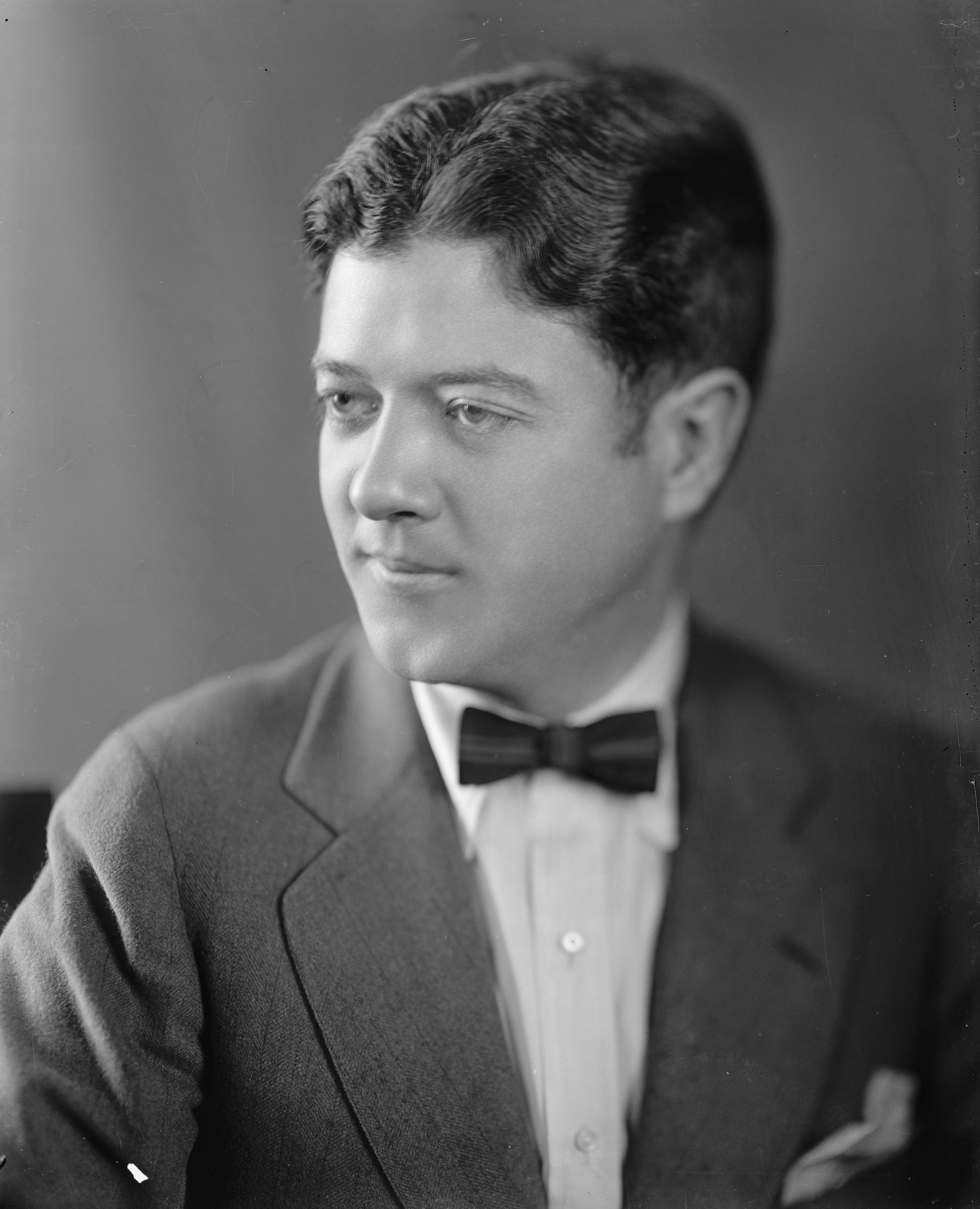
Portrait by Harris & Ewing c. 1920s

On September 29, 1925, La Follette was elected as a Republican to the United States Senate to fill the vacancy caused by the death of his father. "Young Bob", as he was called, was a champion of organized labor. He gained national prominence between 1936 and 1940 as chairman of a special Senate investigating committee, commonly called the La Follette Civil Liberties Committee, that exposed the surveillance, physical intimidation, and other techniques used by large employers to prevent workers from organizing.

He was chairman of the Committee on Manufactures in the 71st and 72nd Congresses. He supported President Franklin D. Roosevelt and most New Deal legislation until he broke over the passage of the 1938 naval expansion bill.

He was re-elected as a Republican in 1928, and as a Progressive in 1934 and 1940.

=== Progressive, Isolationist ===
With his brother Philip, he formed the Wisconsin Progressive Party in 1934, and for a time the party was dominant in Wisconsin. He was reelected with the Progressive Party in 1934 and 1940. One of the Senate's leading isolationists, La Follette helped found the America First Committee in 1940.

In April 1943 a confidential analysis by English researcher Isaiah Berlin for the British Foreign Office stated that La Follette was the:

"son of the celebrated Governor and brother of ex-Governor Philip La Follette of that State. Intimately tied with the very peculiar "progressive" Wisconsin political organization, who started as an Isolationist New Dealer and by degrees has turned into a confused anti-administration Nationalist. He is a very eccentric and unpredictable political figure who continues to be radical in internal issues and obscurantist in foreign affairs. He is said to be prepared to approve of Britain after she had expiated her past errors by more suffering than she had already endured. He is entirely independent of business interests and pressure groups, and his strength comes from the traditional place occupied by his family in Wisconsin. On the whole an ally of the Isolationists."

In 1938, with the formation of the National Progressives of America (NPA), initially seemingly skeptical of his brother's efforts with establishment of the NPA, La Follette became a "stanch" supporter of the new political party.

=== Return to the Republican Party ===
When the Wisconsin Progressive Party dissolved, La Follette returned to the Republican Party in 1946. He helped to draft and win passage of the Legislative Reorganization Act of 1946 that modernized the legislative process in Congress.

==== Electoral defeat ====
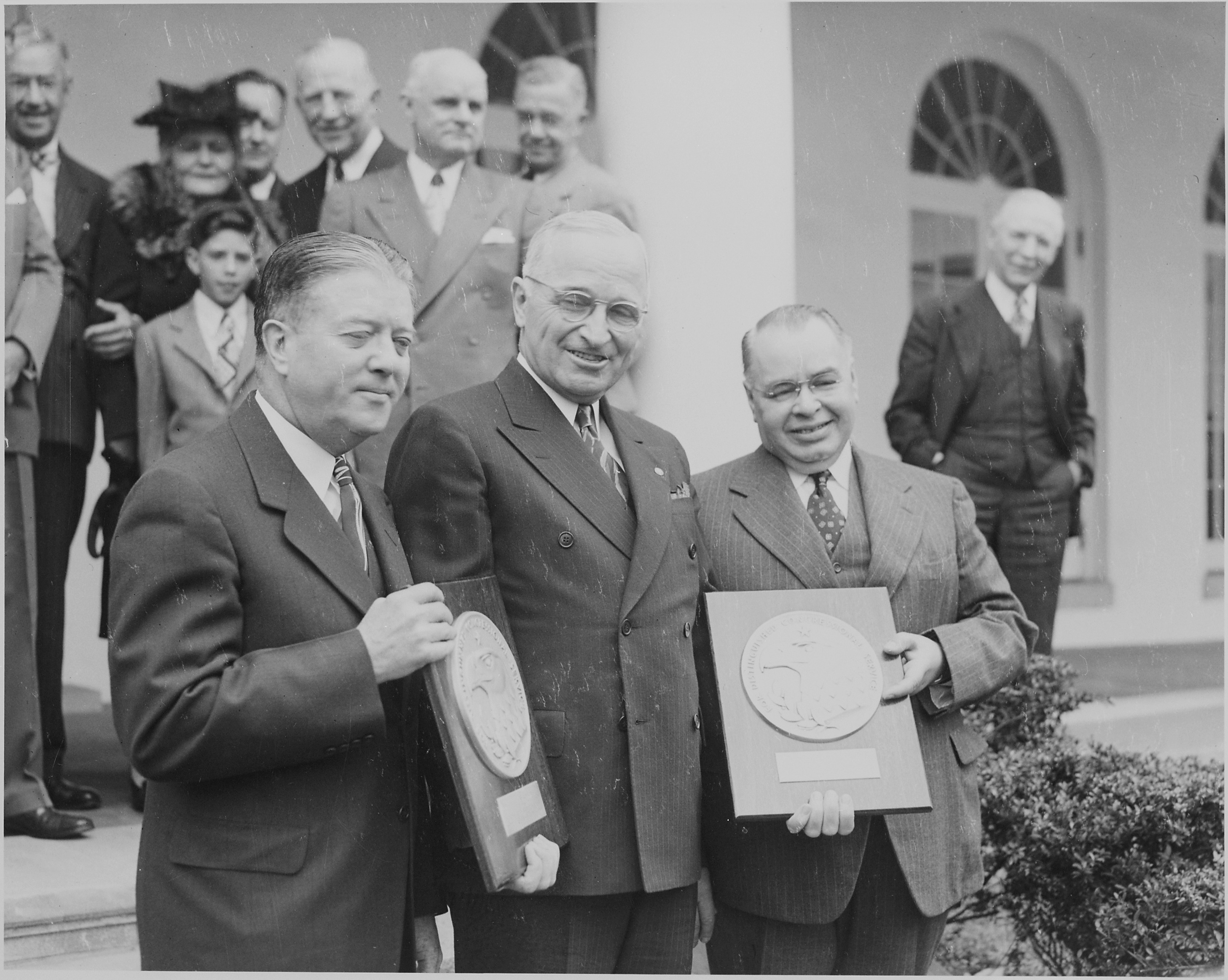
La Follette (left) and Jesse P. Wolcott (right) receiving Collier's Congressional Award from President Harry S. Truman (April 17, 1947)

La Follette was an unsuccessful candidate for renomination as a Republican in 1946. He ran an isolationist campaign against the United Nations and was critical of Soviet dictator Joseph Stalin; he ended up narrowly losing to Joseph McCarthy in the Republican primary, by 207,935 votes to 202,557. While La Follette initially started with a large lead in the polls, that lead gradually dwindled, and on the primary election day, the results of the final county to report polls tipped the scales in McCarthy's favor. La Follette sent a one-word telegram saying "Congratulations" to McCarthy.

La Follette made several decisions that hurt his primary campaign. Disbanding the Progressive Party and seeking election on the Republican ticket that same year cost him the support of many progressive supporters that belonged to the former, while the more conservative Republicans were also suspicious of La Follette, for he had previously run against them. Being initially confident of victory, he further hurt his chances by staying on in Washington to draft and win passage of the Legislative Reorganization Act of 1946 rather than returning to Wisconsin to campaign for re-election.

La Follette faced an aggressive campaign by McCarthy and failed to refute the latter's charges, several of which were false. McCarthy attacked La Follette for not enlisting during the war, although La Follette had been 46 when Pearl Harbor was bombed and would have been too old to be accepted. McCarthy played up his own wartime service, using his wartime nickname "Tail-Gunner Joe", and the slogan "Congress needs a tail-gunner". McCarthy also claimed that while he had been away fighting for his country, La Follette had made huge profits from investments; the suggestion that La Follette had been guilty of war profiteering was deeply damaging. (In fact, McCarthy had invested in the stock market himself during the war, netting a profit of $42,000 in 1943. La Follette's investments consisted of partial interest in a radio station, which earned him a profit of $47,000 over two years.)

Arnold Beichman later stated that McCarthy "was elected to his first term in the Senate with support from the Communist-controlled United Electrical, Radio and Machine Workers, CIO", which preferred McCarthy to the anti-communist Robert M. La Follette. This allegation, however, has never been proved.

After his defeat by McCarthy, La Follette was a foreign aid advisor to the Truman administration.

In a Collier's Weekly article of February 8, 1947, La Follette reported infiltration of Communists onto Congressional committee staffs. He wrote, "I know from firsthand experience that Communist sympathizers have infiltrated into committee staffs on Capitol Hill in Washington." He cited his own former subcommittee, as well as the Kilgore Subcommittee on War Mobilization and the Murray Social Committee on Small Business. He named some half-dozen CIO affiliates as being openly pro-Communist: United Electrical, Radio and Machine Workers (UE), International Fur & Leather Workers Union (IFLWU), United Public Workers of America (UPWA), Transport Workers Union, Mine, Mill and Smelter Workers (MMSW), the Farm Equipment and Metal Workers, the United Furniture Workers of America (UFW), and the American Communications Association. He also stated that the difficult people to deal with were not "avowed Communists" but "fellow travelers" because "There is no litmus-paper test for these people." The only people he named were union leaders: Abram Flaxer of the UPWA, Reid Robinson of the MMSW, Ben Gold of the Furriers, Michael Quill of the TWU, and Joseph Ryan of the IL.

In August 1947, Washington-based columnist Marquis Childs reported that La Follette was "comfortably established in his own offices in Washington as an economic consultant to several large corporations."

== Personal life and death ==
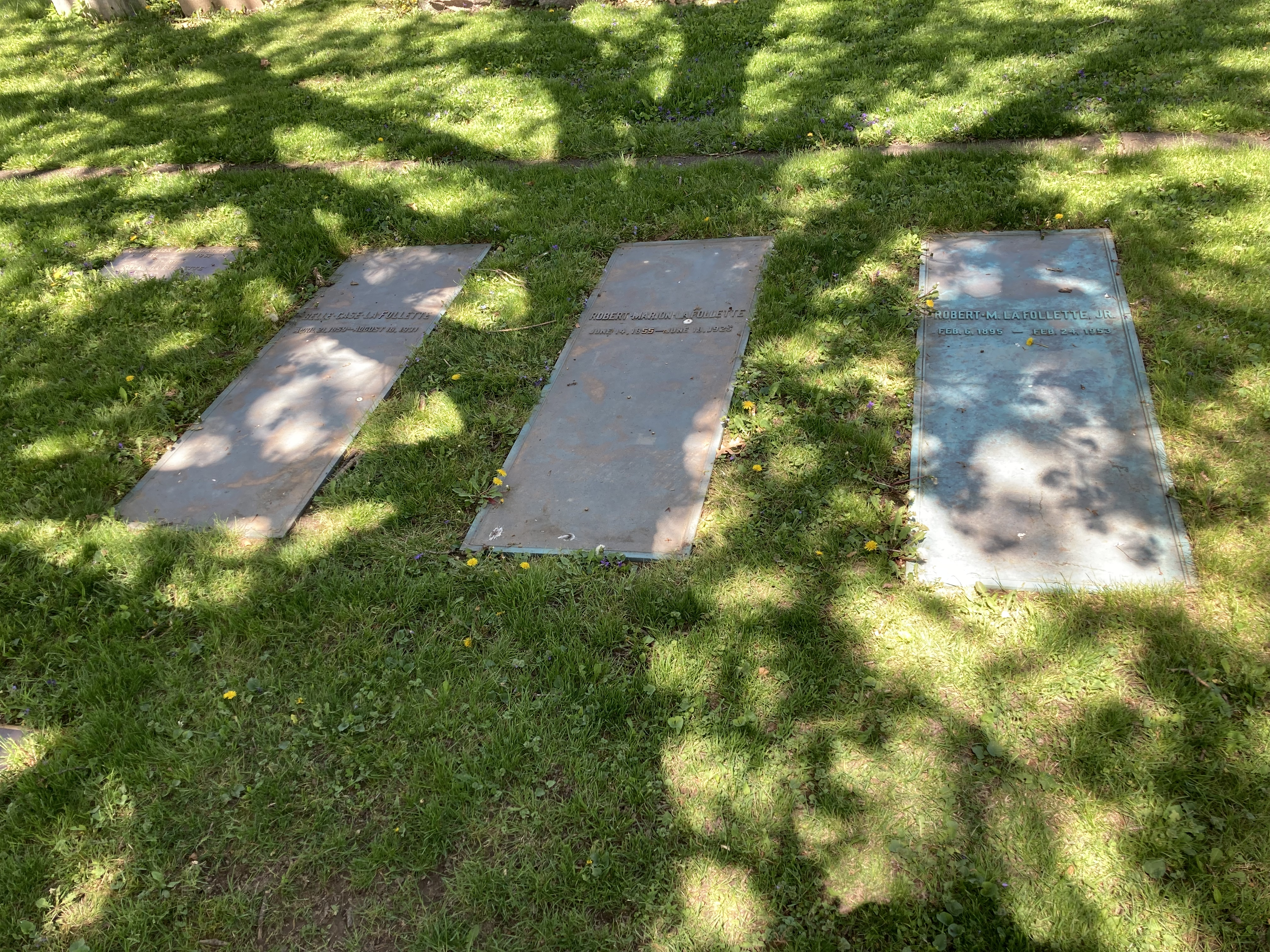
La Follette's grave (right) at Forest Hill Cemetery

In 1930, La Follette married Rachel Wilson Young. They had two children, Joseph Oden La Follette and Bronson Cutting La Follette.

On February 24, 1953, La Follette was found dead of a self-inflicted gunshot wound just days after his 58th birthday in Washington, D.C. His aide Wilbur Voight stated he "apparently had been despondent over a lingering heart condition".

La Follette was interred at Forest Hill Cemetery in Madison, Wisconsin, and was survived by his sons, Bronson La Follette, who served as Wisconsin's attorney general from 1965 to 1969 and from 1975 to 1987, and Joseph Oden La Follette, who spent his career working at IBM.

On September 9, 1953, John Lautner testified before McCarthy's Permanent Subcommittee on Investigations, revealing the existence of the Communists who had served on La Follette's subcommittee staff. Some historians believe that La Follette killed himself out of fear of being exposed by McCarthy; others believe he succumbed to anxiety and depression that had plagued him for much of his life.

== Awards ==
- 1938: Honorary LL.D. from the University of Wisconsin
- 1947: Collier's magazine Congressional Award for outstanding public service

== Works ==
- "Never Prohibition Again", Atlantic Monthly (1943)
- "A Senator Looks at Congress", Atlantic Monthly (1943)
- "Turn the Light on Communism", Collier's Weekly (1947)

== See also ==
- List of American politicians who switched parties in office
- List of United States senators who switched parties

Party political offices
Preceded by Robert M. La Follette	Republican nominee for U.S. Senator from Wisconsin (Class 1); 1925, 1928	Succeeded by John B. Chapple
U.S. Senate
Preceded by Robert M. La Follette	U.S. Senator (Class 1) from Wisconsin; 1925–1947; Served alongside: Irvine Lenroot, John J. Blaine, F. Ryan Duffy, Alexander Wiley	Succeeded by Joseph McCarthy
Preceded by George P. McLean	Chair of the Senate Manufactures Committee; 1929–1933	Succeeded by Robert J. Bulkley
New office	Chair of the Joint Reorganization Committee; 1945–1947	Position abolished
