= William D. Carroll =

American politician and businessman

William D. Carroll (June 6, 1880 – November 13, 1955) was an American politician and businessman.

Born in Hayton, Calumet County, Wisconsin, Carroll went to Chilton High School. He was in the hotel, real estate and insurance business in Prairie du Chien, Wisconsin and was a farmer. He joined the Democratic Party in 1912. Carroll served on the Crawford County, Wisconsin Board of Supervisors and on the school board. He also served on the Prairie du Chien Common Council and served as mayor from 1949 until his death in 1955. Carroll served on the Wisconsin State Senate from 1932 to 1936. In 1944, he was a candidate for the United States House of Representatives from Wisconsin's 3rd congressional district, losing to incumbent William H. Stevenson. He was also a delegate to the Democratic National Convention in 1924, 1928, 1944 and 1948. Carroll died in Prairie du Chien, Wisconsin on November 13, 1955.
