= Stephen J. McMahon =

American judge (1881–1960)

Stephen John McMahon (January 13, 1881 – February 14, 1960) was a judge of the United States Board of Tax Appeals (later the United States Tax Court) from 1929 to 1936, and a candidate for the United States Senate in 1938.

Born in Manitowoc County, Wisconsin, McMahon was raised on a farm in the town of Meeme, in that county. He graduated from Manitowoc High School in 1898 and attended Milwaukee Normal School before receiving a B.A. from the University of Wisconsin–Madison in 1903, followed by a law degree from the same institution in 1906. McMahon was a high school principal in Mount Horeb, Wisconsin and superintendent of schools at Black River Falls, Wisconsin, later serving as an assistant U.S. attorney for the Eastern District of Wisconsin and a member of the law school faculty at Marquette University.

In 1929, McMahon was appointed by President Herbert Hoover to a seat on the Board of Tax Appeals vacated by the resignation of Forest D. Siefkin. McMahon resigned from that position in 1936, and in 1938, he sought the Republican nomination for the U.S. Senate in Wisconsin, citing his experience on the Board as providing insight into the burdens of taxation. However, McMahon was unsuccessful, losing the nomination to Alexander Wiley, who would go on to win the general election.

From 1945 to 1948, McMahon served as a legal and economic specialist for the United States War Department, in Japan and Korea. Following this service, he moved to Washington, D.C., where he resided until his death. He died in his home, following a pulmonary collapse.
