= 2016 United States Senate election in Wisconsin =

- November 8, 2016
- Turnout: 67.34%
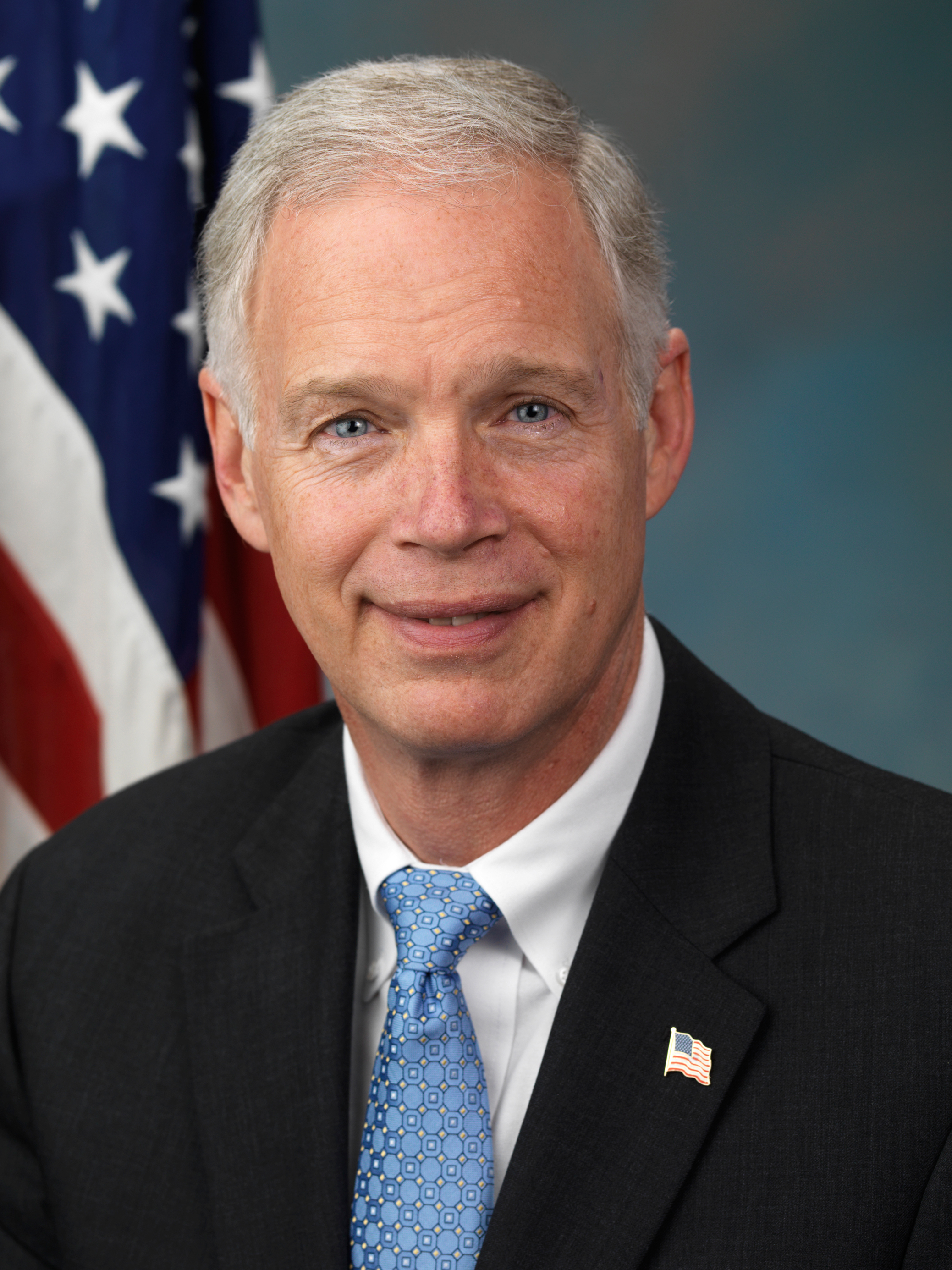

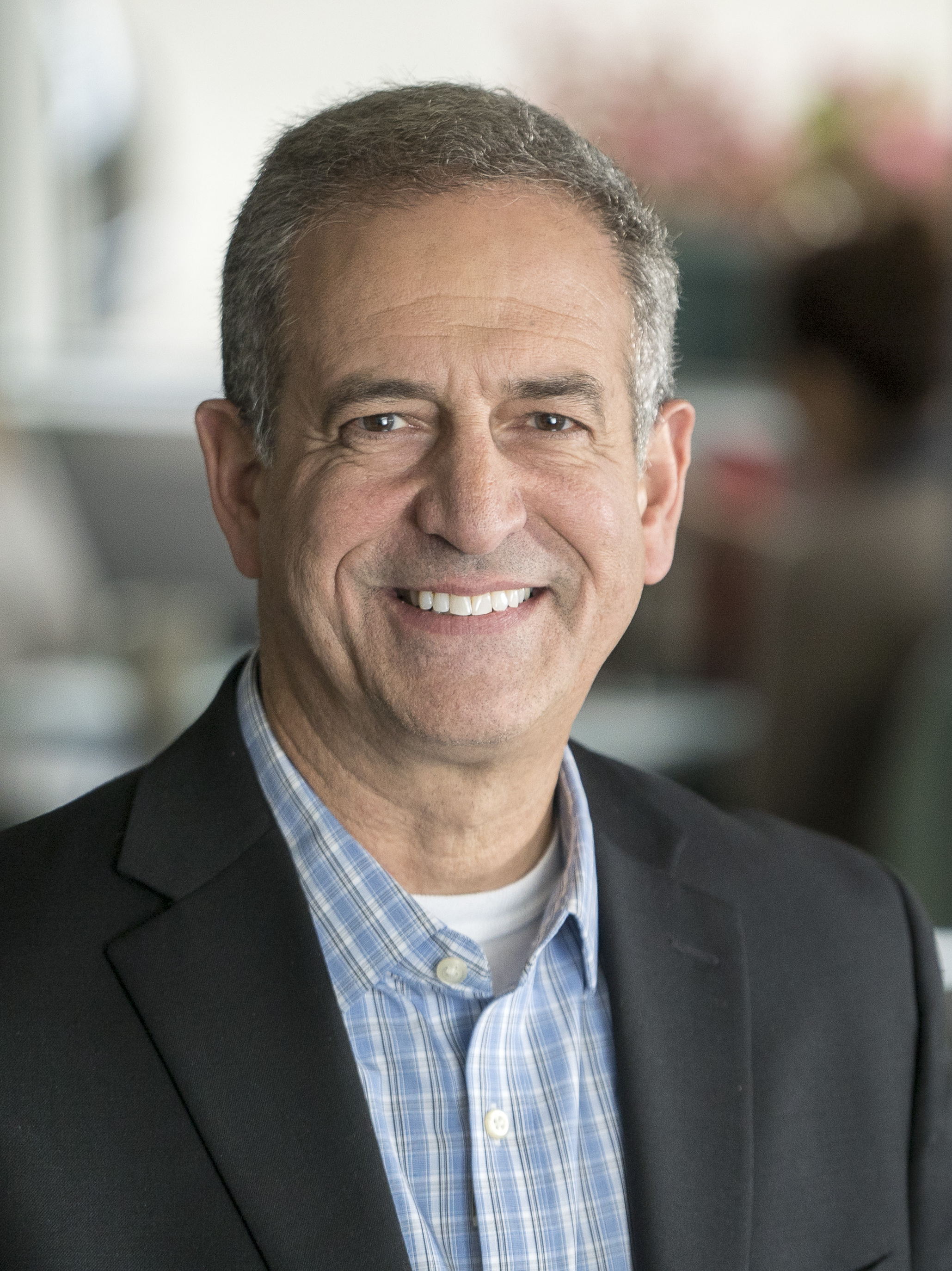
Nominee	Ron Johnson	Russ Feingold
Party	Republican	Democratic
Popular vote	1,479,471	1,380,335
Percentage	50.17%	46.81%
- Johnson: 40–50% 50–60% 60–70% 70–80% Feingold: 40–50% 50–60% 60–70% 70–80%
U.S. senator before election
Ron Johnson
Republican
Elected U.S. Senator
Ron Johnson
Republican

The 2016 United States Senate election in Wisconsin was held on November 8, 2016, to elect a member of the United States Senate to represent the State of Wisconsin, concurrently with the 2016 U.S. presidential election, other elections to the United States Senate in other states, elections to the United States House of Representatives, and various state and local elections. The primaries were held on August 9, 2016.

Incumbent Republican Senator Ron Johnson was re-elected to a second term in office. Former U.S. Senator Russ Feingold, whom Johnson unseated in the 2010 midterm elections, sought a rematch for a fourth non-consecutive term in office but was again defeated by Johnson, who became the first Republican to win a Senate election in Wisconsin during a presidential election year since Bob Kasten in 1980. Kasten was ultimately unseated by Feingold in 1992. Johnson's victory was considered an upset as most polling had Feingold in the lead, coinciding with Donald Trump's own surprise victory in the state's presidential contest. Feingold managed to win six counties that Donald Trump won in the concurrent presidential race: Columbia, Crawford, Lafayette, Richland, Sauk and Vernon.

== Background ==
In 2010, then-incumbent Democratic senator Russ Feingold ran for re-election to a fourth term in 2010 and was defeated by Republican nominee Ron Johnson.

In March 2013, Johnson announced that he had begun fundraising for his campaign. At that time, he had just $1,529 remaining in his campaign account after raising $16.1 million for the 2010 election, over half of which he self-funded. Johnson said in November 2014 that he would not self-finance another campaign, saying: "I made my $9 million investment in this country. I gave it once, I don't think I should do it again." On May 14, 2015, Feingold announced he would run to win back his former Senate seat. Ultimately, Feingold spent over $24 million on the campaign and ended up with more remaining cash than Johnson, who spent only $20 million.

After the Republicans took control of the Senate following the 2014 Senate elections, the election in Wisconsin was seen by many as a top target for the Democrats, who hoped to retake their majority in the traditionally blue state. Politico pointed to Johnson's "worrisome" favorability ratings as one of the main reasons for his vulnerability. A March 2014 Marquette University Law School poll found that just 29% of voters had a favorable opinion of him.

== Republican primary ==
=== Candidates ===
==== Declared ====
- Ron Johnson, incumbent U.S. senator

== Democratic primary ==
=== Candidates ===
==== Declared ====
- Russ Feingold, former U.S. senator, and former U.S. special envoy for the African Great Lakes and the Congo-Kinshasa
- Scott Harbach, perennial candidate

==== Declined ====
- Mary Burke, businesswoman, member of the Madison school district board, former Wisconsin secretary of commerce and nominee for governor of Wisconsin in 2014
- Ron Kind, U.S. representative
- Chris Larson, state senator
- Gwen Moore, U.S. representative
- Mark Pocan, U.S. representative

=== Results ===
Democratic primary results
Party	Candidate	Votes	%
Democratic	Russ Feingold	303,791	90.13%
Democratic	Scott Harbach	33,096	9.82%
Total votes		337,079	100.00%

== Libertarian primary ==
=== Candidates ===
==== Declared ====
- Phil Anderson, chair of the Dane County, Wisconsin Libertarian Party and nominee for the State Assembly in 2014

== General election ==
=== Candidates ===
- Phil Anderson (L), chair of the Dane County, Wisconsin Libertarian Party and nominee for the State Assembly in 2014
- Russ Feingold (D), former U.S. senator, and former U.S. special envoy for the African Great Lakes and the Congo-Kinshasa
- Ron Johnson (R), incumbent U.S. senator

=== Debates ===
Dates	Location	Johnson	Feingold	Link
October 14, 2016	Green Bay, Wisconsin	Participant	Participant	
October 18, 2016	Milwaukee, Wisconsin	Participant	Participant	Full debate

=== Endorsements ===
Ron Johnson (R)

Presidents

- George W. Bush, 43rd president of the United States

State Governors

- Scott Walker, governor of Wisconsin and 2016 presidential candidate

U.S. senators

- Lindsey Graham, South Carolina and 2016 presidential candidate
- John McCain, Arizona, 2000 presidential candidate and 2008 presidential nominee

U.S. representatives

- Paul Ryan, Wisconsin and 54th speaker of the House of Representatives

Individuals

- John R. Bolton, former United States ambassador to the United Nations

Organizations

- American Conservative Union
- Associated Builders and Contractors
- Club for Growth
- National Federation of Independent Business
- NRA Political Victory Fund
- United States Chamber of Commerce
Russ Feingold (D)

Presidents

- Barack Obama, 44th president of the United States

Vice presidents

- Joe Biden, 47th vice president of the United States

U.S. cabinet members and cabinet-level officials

- Chuck Hagel, 24th secretary of defense (Republican)

U.S. senators

- Tammy Baldwin, Wisconsin
- Bernie Sanders, Vermont (Independent)
- Jon Tester, Montana
- Elizabeth Warren, Massachusetts

U.S. representatives

- Alan Grayson, Florida
- Mark Pocan, Wisconsin

Wisconsin state senators

- Chris Larson

Labor unions

- AFSCME - American Federation of State, County and Municipal Employees
- AFT - American Federation of Teachers
- IBEW - International Brotherhood of Electrical Workers
- LIUNA - Laborers' International Union of North America
- PFFW - Professional Fire Fighters of Wisconsin
- SEIU - Service Employees International Union
- USW - United Steelworkers
- WEAC - Wisconsin Education Association Council

Organizations

- Blue America
- Daily Kos
- Democratic Senatorial Campaign Committee
- Every Voice
- Human Rights Campaign
- League of Conservation Voters
- MoveOn.org
- National Organization for Women
- Our Revolution
- Planned Parenthood Action Fund
- Sierra Club

=== Predictions ===
Source	Ranking	As of
The Cook Political Report	Tossup	November 2, 2016
Sabato's Crystal Ball	Lean D (flip)	November 7, 2016
Rothenberg Political Report	Tilt D (flip)	November 3, 2016
Daily Kos	Lean D (flip)	November 8, 2016
Real Clear Politics	Tossup	November 7, 2016

=== Polling ===
Poll source	Date(s) administered	Sample size	Margin of error	Ron Johnson (R)	Russ Feingold (D)	Phil Anderson (L)	Other / Neither	Undecided
SurveyMonkey	November 1–7, 2016	2,246	± 4.6%	49%	48%	—	—	3%
SurveyMonkey	October 31–November 6, 2016	1,943	± 4.6%	49%	48%	—	—	3%
SurveyMonkey	October 28–November 3, 2016	1,568	± 4.6%	48%	49%	—	—	3%
Clarity Campaign Labs	November 1–2, 2016	1,129	± 2.9%	46%	49%	—	—	5%
SurveyMonkey	October 27–November 2, 2016	1,271	± 4.6%	48%	48%	—	—	4%
Public Policy Polling	October 31–November 1, 2016	891	± 3.3%	44%	49%	—	—	7%
Loras College	October 31–November 1, 2016	500	± 4.4%	45%	47%	2%	—	6%
SurveyMonkey	October 26–November 1, 2016	1,103	± 4.6%	50%	48%	—	—	2%
Marquette University	October 26–31, 2016	1,190 LV	± 3.5%	44%	45%	3%	2%	3%
Marquette University	October 26–31, 2016	1,401 RV	± 3.3%	42%	43%	5%	3%	5%
SurveyMonkey	October 25–31, 2016	1,195	± 4.6%	49%	49%	—	—	2%
Emerson College	October 27–28, 2016	400	± 4.9%	44%	49%	—	4%	3%
Let America Work^	October 18–20, 2016	600	± 4.0%	46%	48%	2%	—	4%
Club for Growth^	October 18–20, 2016	400	± 4.2%	42%	45%	—	—	13%
Public Policy Polling	October 18–19, 2016	804	± 3.5%	41%	47%	—	—	12%
Monmouth University	October 15–18, 2016	403	± 4.9%	44%	52%	2%	—	2%
Wisconsin Public Radio/St. Norbert College	October 13–16, 2016	664	± 3.8%	40%	52%	0%	3%	5%
Washington Post/SurveyMonkey	October 8–16, 2016	1,076	± 0.5%	46%	51%	—	—	3%
Google Consumer Surveys	October 12–14, 2016	551	± 4.2%	39%	58%	—	—	3%
Marquette University	October 6–9, 2016	839 LV	± 3.9%	44%	46%	4%	1%	4%
Marquette University	October 6–9, 2016	839 LV	± 3.9%	46%	48%	—	1%	4%
Marquette University	October 6–9, 2016	1,000 RV	± 3.7%	42%	44%	6%	1%	6%
Marquette University	October 6–9, 2016	1,000 RV	± 3.7%	44%	47%	—	2%	5%
CBS News/YouGov	October 5–7, 2016	993	± 4.3%	42%	45%	—	—	13%
Loras College	October 4–5, 2016	500	± 4.4%	45%	40%	—	3%	9%
Breitbart/Gravis Marketing	October 4, 2016	1,102	± 3.0%	41%	53%	—	—	6%
Emerson College	September 19–20, 2016	700	± 3.6%	42%	52%	—	3%	4%
Marquette University	September 15–18, 2016	642 LV	± 4.8%	39%	44%	7%	—	10%
Marquette University	September 15–18, 2016	642 LV	± 4.8%	41%	47%	—	—	8%
Marquette University	September 15–18, 2016	802 RV	± 4.4%	37%	44%	8%	—	10%
Marquette University	September 15–18, 2016	802 RV	± 4.4%	40%	46%	—	—	11%
Monmouth University	August 27–30, 2016	404	± 4.9%	41%	54%	2%	—	3%
Public Policy Polling	August 26–27, 2016	1,054	± 3.0%	42%	49%	—	—	9%
Marquette University	August 25–28, 2016	650 LV	± 5.0%	42%	45%	6%	—	7%
Marquette University	August 25–28, 2016	650 LV	± 5.0%	45%	48%	—	—	7%
Marquette University	August 25–28, 2016	803 RV	± 4.5%	38%	42%	8%	—	12%
Marquette University	August 25–28, 2016	803 RV	± 4.5%	42%	46%	—	—	12%
Global Strategy Group	August 25, 2016	800	± 3.5%	37%	55%	—	—	8%
Let America Work^	August 21–22, 2016	600	± 4.0%	47%	50%	—	—	3%
Marquette University	August 4–7, 2016	683 LV	± 5.0%	39%	50%	7%	—	4%
Marquette University	August 4–7, 2016	683 LV	± 5.0%	42%	53%	—	—	6%
Marquette University	August 4–7, 2016	805 RV	± 4.5%	38%	47%	7%	—	8%
Marquette University	August 4–7, 2016	805 RV	± 4.5%	43%	49%	—	—	8%
Let America Work^	July 30–August 1, 2016	600	± 4.0%	44%	50%	—	—	6%
Global Strategy Group	July 20, 2016	800	± 3.5%	41%	52%	—	—	7%
Marquette University	July 7–10, 2016	665 LV	± 4.5%	40%	46%	7%	—	7%
Marquette University	July 7–10, 2016	665 LV	± 4.5%	44%	49%	—	—	7%
Marquette University	July 7–10, 2016	801 RV	± 4.1%	38%	45%	8%	—	9%
Marquette University	July 7–10, 2016	801 RV	± 4.1%	41%	48%	—	—	11%
Public Policy Polling	June 22–23, 2016	843	± 3.4%	37%	50%	—	—	13%
Greenberg Quinlan Rosner - Democracy Corps	June 11–20, 2016	300	± 5.7%	45%	46%	—	—	9%
Marquette University	June 9–12, 2016	666 LV	± 4.9%	42%	51%	—	—	7%
Marquette University	June 9–12, 2016	800 RV	± 4.4%	41%	45%	—	—	14%
Public Policy Polling	June 8–9, 2016	853	± 3.4%	41%	51%	—	—	8%
Wisconsin Public Radio/St. Norbert College	April 12–15, 2016	616	± 4.0%	41%	51%	—	—	6%
Emerson College	March 30–April 3, 2016	1,198	± 2.8%	44%	48%	—	8%	—
Public Policy Polling	March 28–29, 2016	1,397	± 2.6%	39%	46%	—	—	15%
Loras College	March 28–29, 2016	1,000	± 3.1%	39%	48%	—	1%	12%
Marquette University	March 24–28, 2016	957 LV	± 4.1%	45%	48%	—	—	7%
Marquette University	March 24–28, 2016	1,405 RV	± 3.3%	42%	47%	—	—	11%
Marquette University	February 18–21, 2016	802 RV	± 4.5%	37%	49%	—	—	14%
Marquette University	January 21–24, 2016	806 RV	± 4.0%	37%	50%	—	—	13%
Let America Work (Note: Archived December 8, 2015, at the Wayback Machine)^	November 16–18, 2015	900	± 3.3%	44%	45%	—	—	11%
Marquette University	November 12–15, 2015	803 RV	± 4.2%	38%	49%	—	—	13%
Democracy Corps	October 24–28, 2015	400	± 4.9%	46%	51%	—	—	3%
Wisconsin Public Radio/St. Norbert College	October 14–17, 2015	603	± 4.0%	40%	51%	—	2%	7%
Marquette University	September 24–28, 2015	803 RV	± 4.1%	36%	50%	—	7%	7%
End Citizens United	September 10–14, 2015	775	± 3.6%	39%	47%	—	—	14%
Marquette University	August 13–16, 2015	802 RV	± 3.5%	42%	47%	—	—	12%
Marquette University	April 7–10, 2015	803 RV	± 3.5%	38%	54%	—	—	9%
Public Policy Polling	March 6–8, 2015	1,071	± 3.0%	41%	50%	—	—	9%
Public Policy Polling	April 17–20, 2014	1,144	± 2.9%	41%	47%	—	—	12%
Public Policy Polling	September 13–16, 2013	1,180	± 2.9%	42%	49%	—	—	9%
Public Policy Polling	February 21–24, 2013	807	± 2.3%	42%	52%	—	—	6%

^ Internal poll taken for Ron Johnson.

Hypothetical polling

with Mary Burke

Poll source	Date(s) administered	Sample size	Margin of error	Ron Johnson (R)	Mary Burke (D)	Undecided
Public Policy Polling	March 6–8, 2015	1,071	± 3.0%	45%	46%	9%

with Mark Pocan

Poll source	Date(s) administered	Sample size	Margin of error	Ron Johnson (R)	Mark Pocan (D)	Undecided
Public Policy Polling	March 6–8, 2015	1,071	± 3.0%	43%	36%	20%

with Gwen Moore

Poll source	Date(s) administered	Sample size	Margin of error	Ron Johnson (R)	Gwen Moore (D)	Other	Undecided
Public Policy Polling	March 6–8, 2015	1,071	± 3.0%	45%	37%	—	18%

with Ron Kind

Poll source	Date(s) administered	Sample size	Margin of error	Ron Johnson (R)	Ron Kind (D)	Other	Undecided
Public Policy Polling	March 6–8, 2015	1,071	± 3.0%	43%	37%	—	20%
Public Policy Polling	April 17–20, 2014	1,144	± 2.9%	41%	39%	—	20%
Public Policy Polling	September 13–16, 2013	1,180	± 2.9%	43%	40%	—	17%

=== Results ===
2016 United States Senate election in Wisconsin
Party	Candidate	Votes	%	±%
Republican	Ron Johnson (incumbent)	1,479,471	50.17%	−1.69%
Democratic	Russ Feingold	1,380,335	46.81%	−0.21%
Libertarian	Phil Anderson	87,531	2.97%	N/A
Write-in		1,404	0.05%	+0.01%
Total votes		2,948,741	100.00%	N/A
Republican hold				

==== Counties that flipped from Republican to Democratic ====
- Columbia (largest municipality: Portage)
- Lafayette (largest municipality: Darlington)
- Richland (largest municipality: Richland Center)

==== By congressional district ====
Johnson won six of eight congressional districts, including one that elected a Democrat.

District	Johnson	Feingold	Representative
1st	56%	41%	Paul Ryan
2nd	30%	67%	Mark Pocan
3rd	49%	47%	Ron Kind
4th	26%	71%	Gwen Moore
5th	63%	35%	Jim Sensenbrenner
6th	58%	38%	Glenn Grothman
7th	57%	40%	Sean Duffy
8th	59%	38%	Reid Ribble
8th	59%	38%	Mike Gallagher
