= Russ Feingold =

American politician (born 1953)

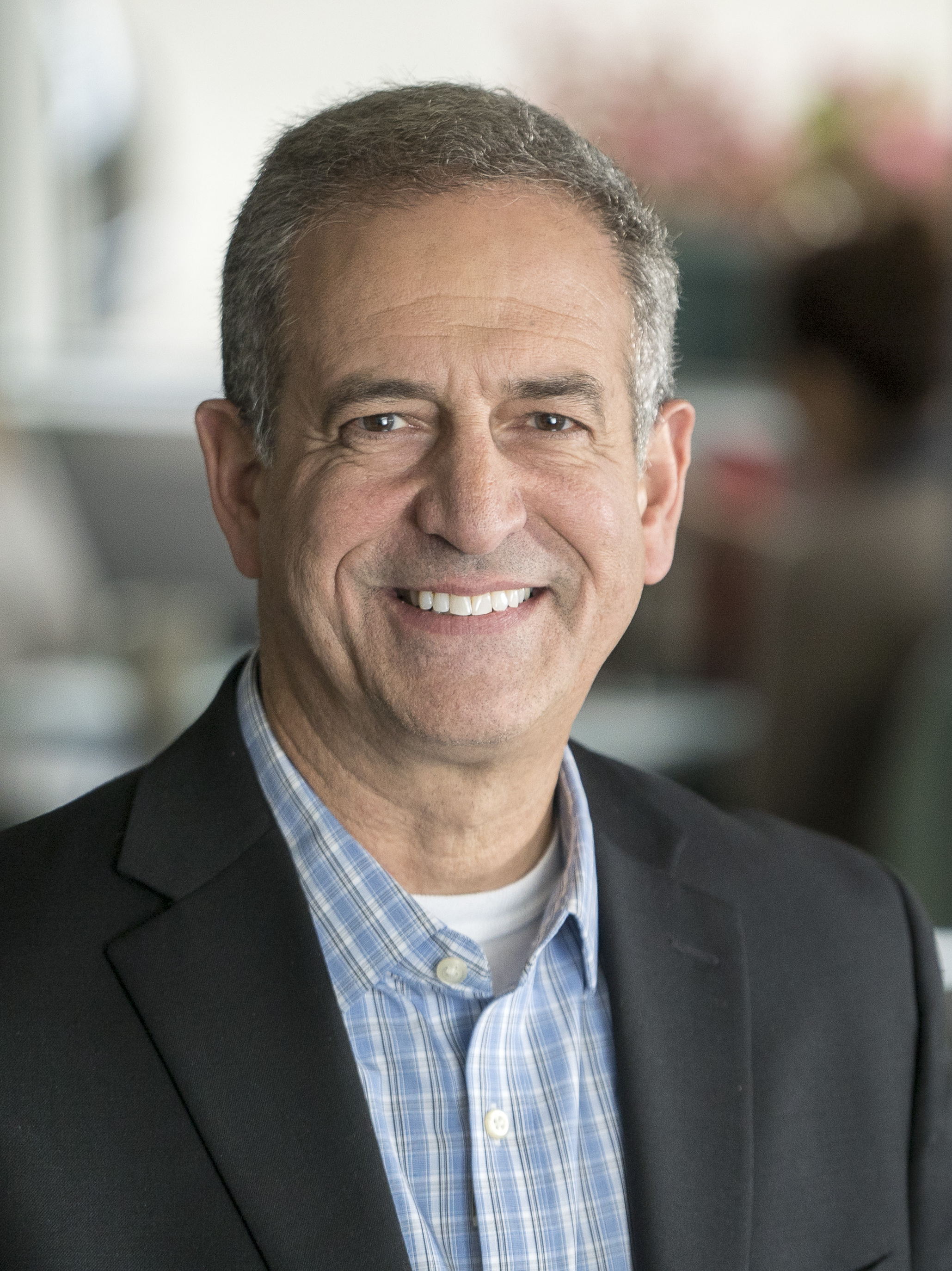
- Feingold in 2015

United States Special Envoy for the African Great Lakes and the Congo-Kinshasa
- In office July 18, 2013 – March 6, 2015
- President: Barack Obama
- Preceded by: Barrie Walkley
- Succeeded by: Tom Perriello

United States Senator from Wisconsin
- In office January 3, 1993 – January 3, 2011
- Preceded by: Bob Kasten
- Succeeded by: Ron Johnson

Member of the Wisconsin Senate from the 27th district
- In office January 3, 1983 – January 3, 1993
- Preceded by: Everett Bidwell
- Succeeded by: Joseph Wineke

Personal details
- Born: Russell Dana Feingold; March 2, 1953 (age 73) Janesville, Wisconsin, U.S.
- Party: Democratic
- Spouses: Sue Levine (m. 1977; div. 1986); Mary Speerschneider (m. 1991; div. 2005); Christine Ferdinand (m. 2013)
- Children: 2
- Education: University of Wisconsin, Madison (BA); Magdalen College, Oxford (BA); Harvard University (JD)
- Feingold's voice Feingold closing debate on the Bipartisan Campaign Reform Act of 2002. Recorded March 20, 2002

Russell Dana Feingold (/ˈfaɪnɡoʊld/ FYNE-gold; born March 2, 1953) is an American lawyer and politician who served from 1993 to 2011 as a United States senator from Wisconsin. A member of the Democratic Party, he represented Wisconsin's 27th Senate district from 1983 to 1993 and was the U.S. Special Envoy for the African Great Lakes and the Democratic Republic of the Congo from 2013 to 2015.

In the Senate, Feingold was known for being the only U.S. senator to vote against the Patriot Act following the September 11 attacks. His signature legislative achievement was the Bipartisan Campaign Reform Act, which he co-authored with Republican senator John McCain. Feingold and McCain received the 1999 John F. Kennedy Profile in Courage Award for their efforts. The law, commonly known as the McCain–Feingold Act, sought to limit the influence of money in federal elections, though key provisions were later weakened by court decisions, culminating in the 2010 U.S. Supreme Court decision Citizens United v. FEC.

Feingold was first elected to the Senate in 1992, defeating incumbent Bob Kasten, and was reelected in 1998 and 2004. He was mentioned as a potential candidate for the 2008 Democratic presidential nomination but did not run. After losing reelection in 2010 to Ron Johnson, he founded the political action committee Progressives United, which funded progressive candidates in the 2012 elections, before being appointed U.S. Special Envoy by President Barack Obama in 2013.

Feingold unsuccessfully sought his former Senate seat in a 2016 rematch against Johnson. He served as president of the American Constitution Society from 2020 to 2025 and chairs the Campaign for Nature's Global Steering Committee.

== Early life, education, and career ==
Feingold was born in Janesville, Wisconsin, to a Jewish family. His grandparents were immigrants from Russia and Galicia. His father, Leon Feingold, was an attorney; his mother, Sylvia Feingold (née Binstock), worked at a title company. Feingold was one of four children. His father and his elder brother David, a Vietnam War conscientious objector, were the major influences on his political development as a youth. As a boy he was also involved with the B'nai B'rith Youth Organization and Aleph Zadik Aleph. He graduated from Janesville's Joseph A. Craig High School in 1971, and went on to attend the University of Wisconsin–Madison.

While in college, Feingold volunteered for New York City mayor John Lindsay in his campaign for the 1972 Democratic presidential nomination. In the 1976 primaries, he supported Arizona U.S. representative Mo Udall, and later U.S. senator Ted Kennedy.

Feingold graduated from the University of Wisconsin in 1975 with a bachelor's degree with honors in political science. He was a member of the Phi Beta Kappa honor society and was inducted into the Iron Shield Society, which is considered the highest honor achievable by University of Wisconsin-Madison undergraduates. Feingold then went to Magdalen College at the University of Oxford on a Rhodes Scholarship, where he graduated in 1977 with a first-class honours Bachelor of Arts in jurisprudence. Upon returning to the U.S., he attended Harvard Law School, receiving his J.D. with honors in 1979.

During these years, Feingold moved to Middleton, Wisconsin, which became his primary residence for his entire political career. He worked as an attorney at the private law firms of Foley & Lardner and La Follette & Sinykin from 1979 to 1985.

In 1982, Feingold was elected to the Wisconsin Senate, where he served for 10 years until his election to the United States Senate. He was succeeded in the state senate by Joe Wineke.

== U.S. Senate (1993-2011) ==
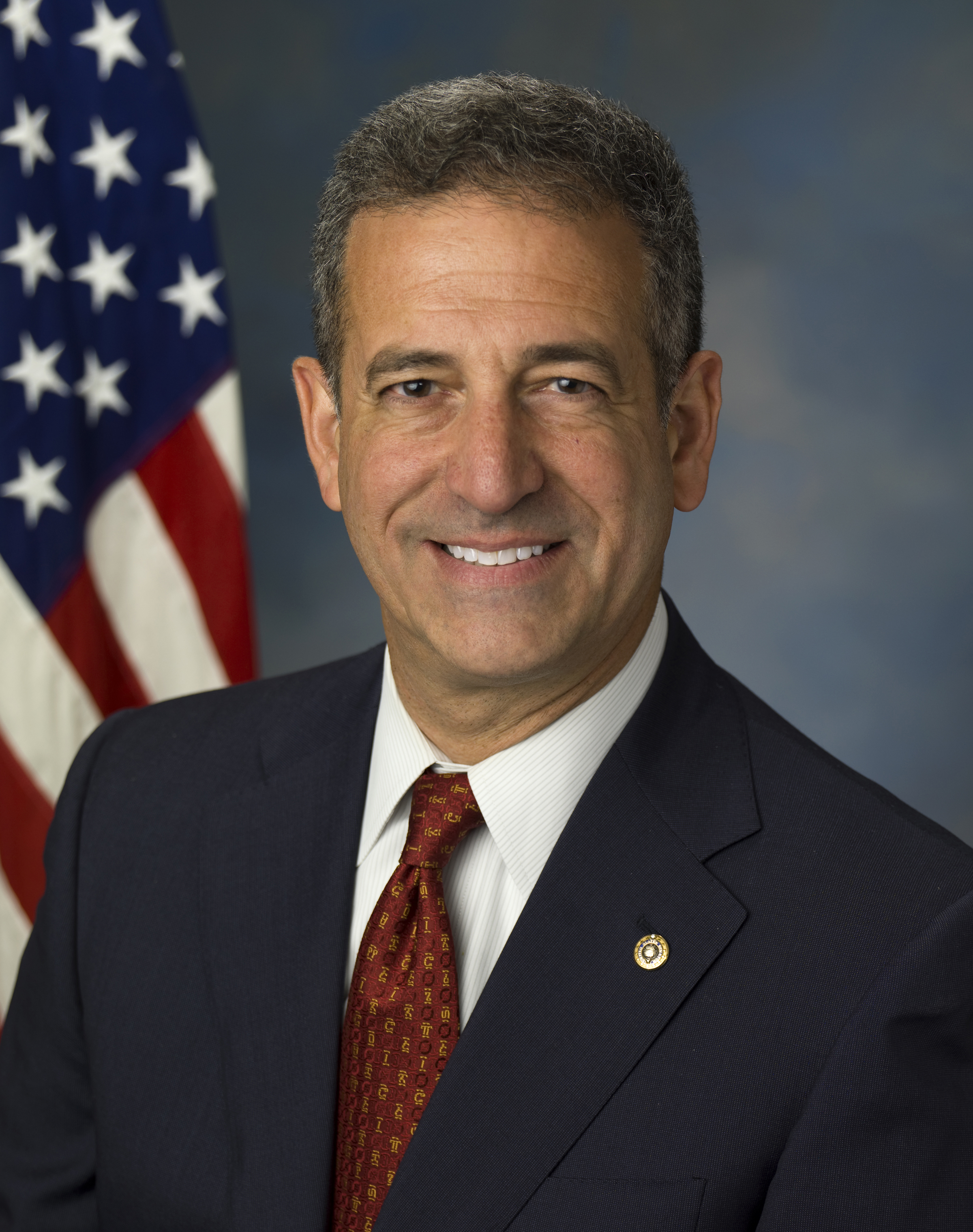
2009 official portrait of Feingold

=== Elections ===
==== 1992 ====
Feingold's U.S. Senate career began in 1992 with a victory over Republican incumbent Senator Bob Kasten. Feingold had little name recognition in the state and was campaigning in a primary against Congressman Jim Moody and businessman Joe Checota, but adopted several proposals to gain the electorate's attention. He painted five promises on his garage door, calling it a contract with Wisconsin voters. Among the promises was a pledge to rely on Wisconsin citizens for most of his contributions and a pledge to hold a "listening session" in each of Wisconsin's 72 counties each year he was in office.

Feingold released an advertisement featuring an Elvis Presley impersonator endorsing his candidacy. Kasten responded to the ad with one of his own featuring another Elvis impersonator attacking Feingold's record.

During the primary campaign, Feingold unveiled an 82-point plan that aimed to eliminate the deficit by the end of his first term. The plan called for a raise in taxes and cuts in the defense budget, among other things, and was derided as "extremist" by Republicans and "too liberal" by his Democratic opponents. Feingold also announced his support for strict campaign finance reform and a national health care system and voiced his opposition to term limits and new tax cuts.

Feingold won by positioning himself as a quirky underdog who offered voters an alternative to what was seen by many as negative campaigning by opponents Jim Moody and Joe Checota. After polling in the single digits for much of the campaign, Feingold won the primary with 70% of the vote. Seven weeks later, while Bill Clinton, George H. W. Bush, and Ross Perot split the Wisconsin presidential vote 41%–37%–21%, Feingold beat Kasten, 53% to 46%.

==== 1998 ====
During his 1998 reelection campaign, Feingold was outspent by his Republican opponent, Representative Mark Neumann, and targeted by the National Republican Senatorial Committee. Feingold capped his own fundraising, pledging not to raise or spend more than $3.8 million (one dollar for every citizen of Wisconsin) during the campaign, and turning away Democratic Party soft money. He requested that several lobby groups, including the AFL–CIO and the League of Conservation Voters, refrain from airing pro-Feingold "issue ads". Some Democrats were angry at Feingold for "putting his career at risk" with these self-imposed limits. Neumann also limited himself to $3.8 million in spending, but allowed outside groups to use soft money in his favor. A strong showing in the Democratic strongholds of Milwaukee and Madison allowed Feingold to win the election by about two percentage points.

==== 2004 ====
In the 2004 Senate election, Feingold defeated the Republican nominee, businessman Tim Michels, by 11 percentage points (55%-44%), earning a third term. During the campaign, Feingold refrained from imposing spending caps on himself as he had in the past, and raised and spent almost $11 million. He spent nearly $3.7 million, or about 67%, more than his opponent. PolitiFact.com rated Feingold's frequent assertion that he had been outspent by opponents in every U.S. Senate election "pants on fire."

In late December 2004, Feingold was appointed to be one of four deputy whips for the Senate Democrats.

==== 2010 ====
Feingold was defeated for reelection on November 2, 2010, by Oshkosh businessman Ron Johnson, 52% to 47%.

==== 2016 ====
On May 14, 2015, Feingold announced his candidacy for U.S. Senate against the incumbent, Republican Ron Johnson.

In his 2016 campaign, Feingold said he would no longer adhere to his longstanding pledge to raise the majority of his campaign funds from Wisconsin residents. Feingold said the pledge had been made on an election-to-election basis and no longer made sense. As of March 2016, Feingold had raised the most money among all U.S. Senate candidates challenging an incumbent. Nearly three-fourths of his individual contributions were from outside Wisconsin.

Groups financially supporting Feingold's election bid included Planned Parenthood, the League of Conservation Voters, American Bridge 21st Century, and the National Abortion Rights Action League. In May 2016, Senator Bernie Sanders endorsed Feingold and engaged in fundraising for him.

In the November 8, 2016, general election, Feingold lost to Johnson with 47% of the vote to Johnson's 51%.

=== Committee assignments ===
- Committee on the Budget
- Committee on the Judiciary
  - Subcommittee on Administrative Oversight and the Courts
  - Subcommittee on the Constitution (chairman)
  - Subcommittee on Crime and Drugs
- Committee on Foreign Relations
  - Subcommittee on Near Eastern and South and Central Asian Affairs
  - Subcommittee on African Affairs (chairman)
  - Subcommittee on East Asian and Pacific Affairs
  - Subcommittee on International Operations and Organizations, Democracy and Human Rights
- Select Committee on Intelligence

=== Tenure ===
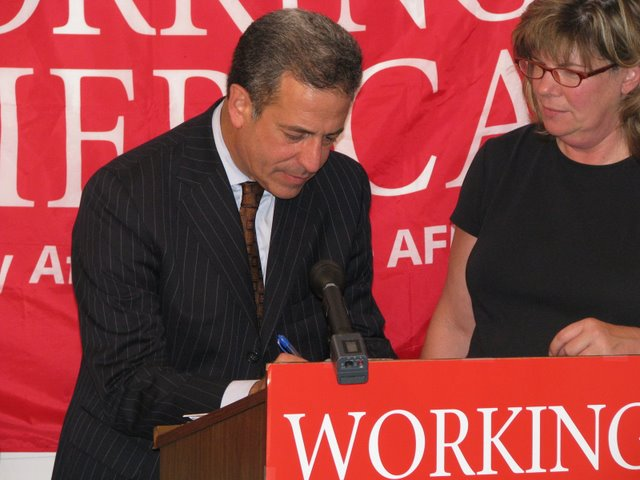
Feingold signs up as a member of Working America, August 4, 2008.

During his time in the U.S. Senate, Feingold gained a reputation as a political maverick. When he broke with his party, it was often because he was taking a more liberal or populist position than other Democrats. Throughout his congressional tenure, several ranking systems placed Feingold among the nation's most liberal or progressive senators.

During the impeachment trial of Bill Clinton, Feingold was the only Democratic senator to vote against a motion to dismiss Congress's impeachment case. Feingold ultimately voted against conviction on all charges.

Feingold opposed NAFTA and numerous other free trade agreements.

In 1999, Feingold and U.S. Senator John McCain, who later co-authored the Bipartisan Campaign Reform Act of 2002, received the JFK Foundation's Profile in Courage Award in recognition of their efforts in pushing for campaign finance reform in the Senate.

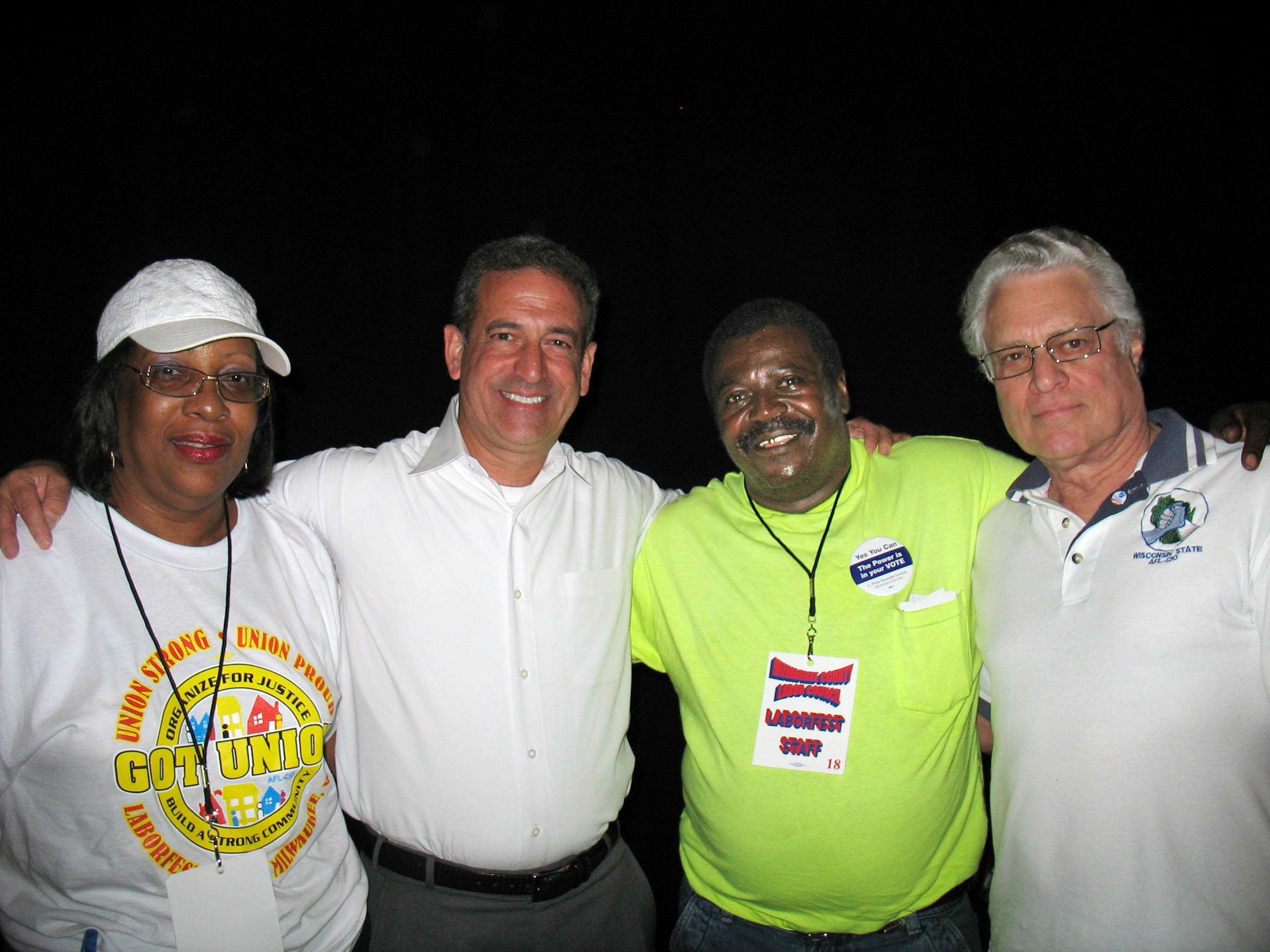
Feingold with labor leaders in Milwaukee, Wisconsin, September 1, 2008.

In 2001, Feingold was the only senator to vote against the Patriot Act (H.R. 3162). Also in 2001, he voted to confirm John Ashcroft as United States Attorney General.

In 2002, Feingold was one of nine senators to vote against creating the Department of Homeland Security.

On December 21, 2004, Feingold wrote an article for Salon about a golfing trip to Greenville, Alabama. In it, after noting how friendly the people there were and that Wisconsin had many similar places, he expressed his sorrow that such a poverty-stricken area was "the reddest spot on the whole map" despite Republican policies that Feingold considered destructive to the well-being of the poor and middle class. Alabama Governor Bob Riley and Greenville Mayor Dexter McLendon, both Republicans, were perturbed by Feingold's description of "check-cashing stores and abject trailer parks, and some of the hardest-used cars for sale on a very rundown lot." McLendon invited Feingold back for a more complete tour of the city, and Feingold agreed. He visited the city on March 28, 2005, making amends and increasing speculation about his presidential plans for 2008.

In May 2006, Feingold voted in favor of bill S.2611, the Comprehensive Immigration Reform Act of 2006, an immigration reform bill designed to give most illegal immigrants a chance to become legal citizens.

Feingold co-sponsored a number of failed bills calling for the abolition of the death penalty.

In 2009, Feingold voted against confirmation of Timothy Geithner to be United States Secretary of the Treasury, citing Geithner's personal tax issues. Also in 2009, Feingold announced his intention to introduce a constitutional amendment prohibiting governors from making temporary Senate appointments instead of holding special elections.

Feingold cosponsored the Veterans Health Care Budget Reform and Transparency Act, which was signed into law in 2009.

==== Campaign finance reform ====
Feingold is perhaps best known for his work with Senator John McCain on the Bipartisan Campaign Reform Act of 2002, better known as the McCain–Feingold Act. The legislation, which took seven years to pass, became defunct in the wake of several U.S. Supreme Court decisions.

==== Wall Street reform ====
On May 20, 2010, Feingold was one of two Democratic senators to vote against the Dodd–Frank Wall Street reform bill, citing his belief that the measures did not go far enough. On July 15, 2010, he became the only Democratic senator to vote against the bill when it was brought up again; it passed by a 60–39 vote.

==== Patriot Act ====
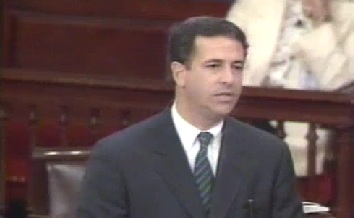
Feingold speaking on the Senate floor about his opposition to the Patriot Act, October 25, 2001.

Feingold was the only senator to vote against the Patriot Act when it was introduced in 2001, saying that its provisions infringed upon citizens' civil liberties.

When the bill was up for renewal in late December 2005, Feingold led a bipartisan coalition of senators—including Lisa Murkowski, Ken Salazar, Larry Craig, Dick Durbin, and John Sununu—to remove some of the act's more controversial provisions. Feingold led a filibuster against renewal of the act. In February 2006, the Senate voted 96–3 to break the filibuster and extend the Patriot Act.

In 2009, when the act was again up for reauthorization, Feingold introduced the JUSTICE Act (S. 1686) "To place reasonable safeguards on the use of surveillance and other authorities under the USA PATRIOT Act." Senator Patrick Leahy then introduced an alternative bill, of which Feingold later said, "while narrower than the JUSTICE Act that Senator Durbin and I have championed, [it] did contain several important and necessary protections for the privacy of innocent Americans." After what Feingold saw as the further watering down of civil liberty protections in the bill, it passed out of the Senate Judiciary Committee on October 8 by a vote of 11 to 8 with Feingold voting against it.

==== War in Iraq ====
Feingold was one of 23 senators to vote against H.J. Resolution 114, which authorized President George W. Bush to use force against Iraq in 2002.

On August 17, 2005, he became the first senator to call for the withdrawal of troops from Iraq and urge that a timetable for that withdrawal be set. He called other Democrats "timid" for refusing to take action sooner, and suggested December 31, 2006, as the date for total withdrawal of troops. Of Bush's claim that a deadline would be helpful to Iraqi insurgents, Feingold said, "I think he's wrong. I think not talking about endgames is playing into our enemies' hand."

On April 27, 2006, Feingold announced that he would move to amend an appropriations bill granting $106.5 billion in emergency spending measure for Iraq and Hurricane Katrina relief to require that troops withdraw completely from Iraq.

==== Call for a vote of censure against President Bush ====
On March 14, 2006, Feingold introduced a resolution in the Senate to censure President Bush. This was a result of allegations of illegal wiretapping under the Foreign Intelligence Surveillance Act of 1978 (FISA), which mandates use of a surveillance court for approval of wiretaps on Americans. Feingold made a 25-minute speech on the Senate floor, declaring that Congress must "hold the president accountable for his actions". It received support from Senators Tom Harkin and Barbara Boxer, but most Democratic senators avoided expressing an opinion on it. Senators John Kerry and Patrick Leahy expressed support for the bill, but Feingold found only three co-sponsors.

Feingold again called for Bush's censure in July 2007 for his management of the Iraq war, accusing him of mounting an "assault" against the United States Constitution.

==== Health care policy ====
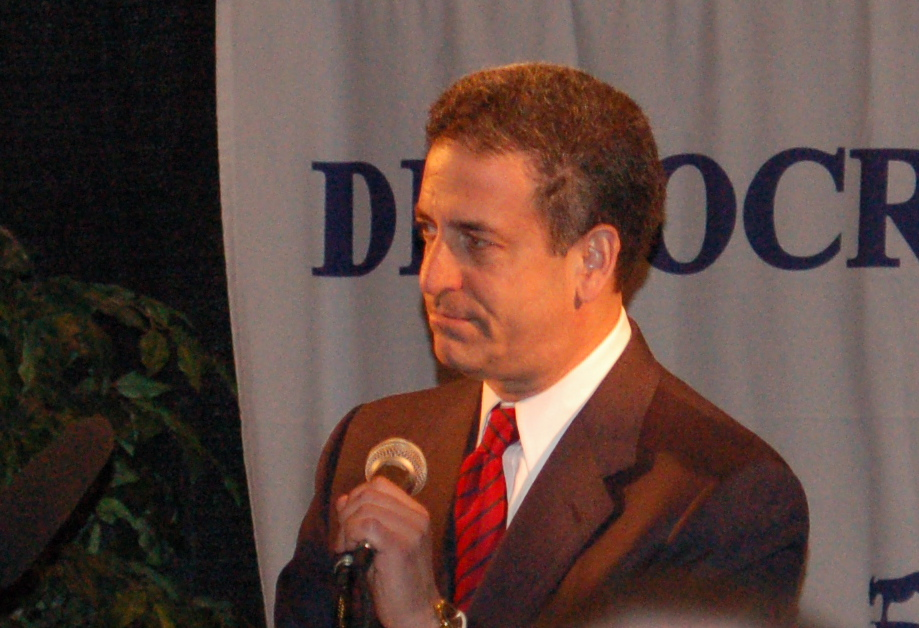
Feingold in 2005.

Feingold supports the creation of a system of universal health care in America. During his first run for the Senate, he endorsed the single-payer model, in which the government pays for all healthcare costs.

On July 24, 2006, at a press conference at the Martin Luther King Heritage Health Center in Milwaukee, Wisconsin, Feingold announced that he had authored the State-Based Health Care Reform Act, a bill to create a pilot program for a system of universal healthcare under which each U.S. state would create a program to provide its citizenry with universal health insurance and the federal government would provide the funding. The bill would create a nonpartisan "Health Care Reform Task Force", which would provide five-year federal grants to two or three states. The program was expected to cost $32 billion over 10 years.

Feingold voted for the Patient Protection and Affordable Care Act that passed the Senate on December 24, 2009.

==== Gun policy ====
Feingold has voted in favor of certain gun-control legislation while also voting to expand certain gun rights. He signed the congressional amicus brief in District of Columbia v. Heller, the U.S. Supreme Court case that overturned a handgun ban in Washington, D.C.

Feingold has voted in favor of bills to require background checks for handgun buyers, to require background checks for firearms purchases at gun shows, and to require that handguns be sold with trigger locks. He supported President Barack Obama's 2016 executive orders to expand background checks and strengthen enforcement of existing gun laws.

==== Social issues ====
Feingold supports abortion rights.

In 1996, Feingold was in a minority of legislators who voted against the Defense of Marriage Act, which President Bill Clinton signed into law. In an April 4, 2006 interview, Feingold announced that he favored the legalization of same-sex marriage.

On May 18, 2006, Feingold walked out of a meeting of the Senate Judiciary Committee shortly before a vote on a constitutional amendment to ban same-sex marriage. He objected to both the amendment and Chairman Arlen Specter's decision to move the meeting to an area of the Capitol Building not open to the public. Later that day, the committee voted to send the amendment to the full Senate.

== 2008 possible presidential bid ==
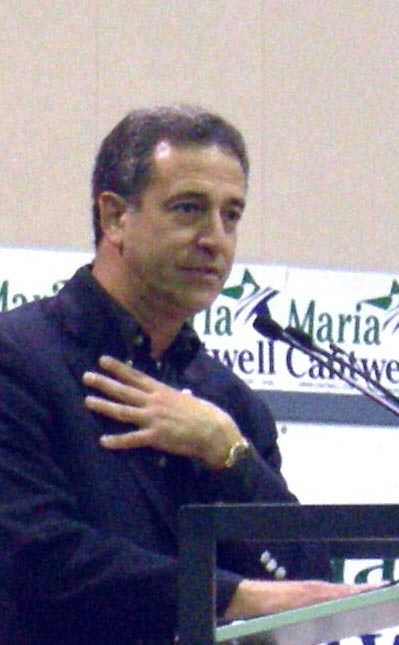
Feingold on the campaign trail, stumping for Maria Cantwell (D-WA), October 2006.

In late January 2005, Feingold told the Tiger Bay Club of Volusia County, Florida that he intended to travel the country before deciding whether to run for president in 2008. In March 2005, his Senate campaign staff registered the domain www.russfeingold08.com, as well as the .org and .net versions. On June 1, 2005, Feingold launched a PAC, the Progressive Patriots Fund. A "draft Feingold" movement was established independently of his campaign.

On August 17, 2005, Feingold became the first U.S. senator to suggest a firm date for American withdrawal from the Iraq War, saying he favored complete withdrawal by December 31, 2006.

Feingold supported John Roberts's Supreme Court nomination in September 2005, and was one of three Democrats on the Senate Judiciary Committee to vote to send the nomination to the floor for a final vote. Feingold graduated from Harvard Law School the same year as Roberts, 1979. In January 2006, Feingold voted against Samuel Alito's nomination to the Court in committee and against cloture of debate on the nomination.

Considered a long shot for president, Feingold announced in November 2006 that he would not seek his party's nomination in 2008. He said that a presidential campaign would detract from his focus on the Senate, and the resulting scrutiny "would dismantle both my professional life (in the Senate) and my personal life." In his parting comments he warned his supporters against supporting anyone for the presidency who voted for the Iraq War, whether they later regretted it or not, saying his first choice for president in 2008 was someone who voted against the war, and his second choice was someone who was not in Congress but spoke out against the war at the time.

On February 22, 2008, he said he had voted for Obama in Wisconsin's Democratic presidential primary election.

== Later life ==
After his 2010 defeat, Feingold was appointed a visiting professor at Marquette University Law School. He wrote a book, While America Sleeps: A Wake-Up Call to the Post-9/11 World, and supported Obama's reelection in 2012. In February 2012, it was announced that Feingold would be a co-chair of Obama's reelection campaign. The same year he was named the Mimi and Peter E. Haas Distinguished Visitor at Stanford Law School and the Stephen Edward Scarff Distinguished Visiting professor at Lawrence University.

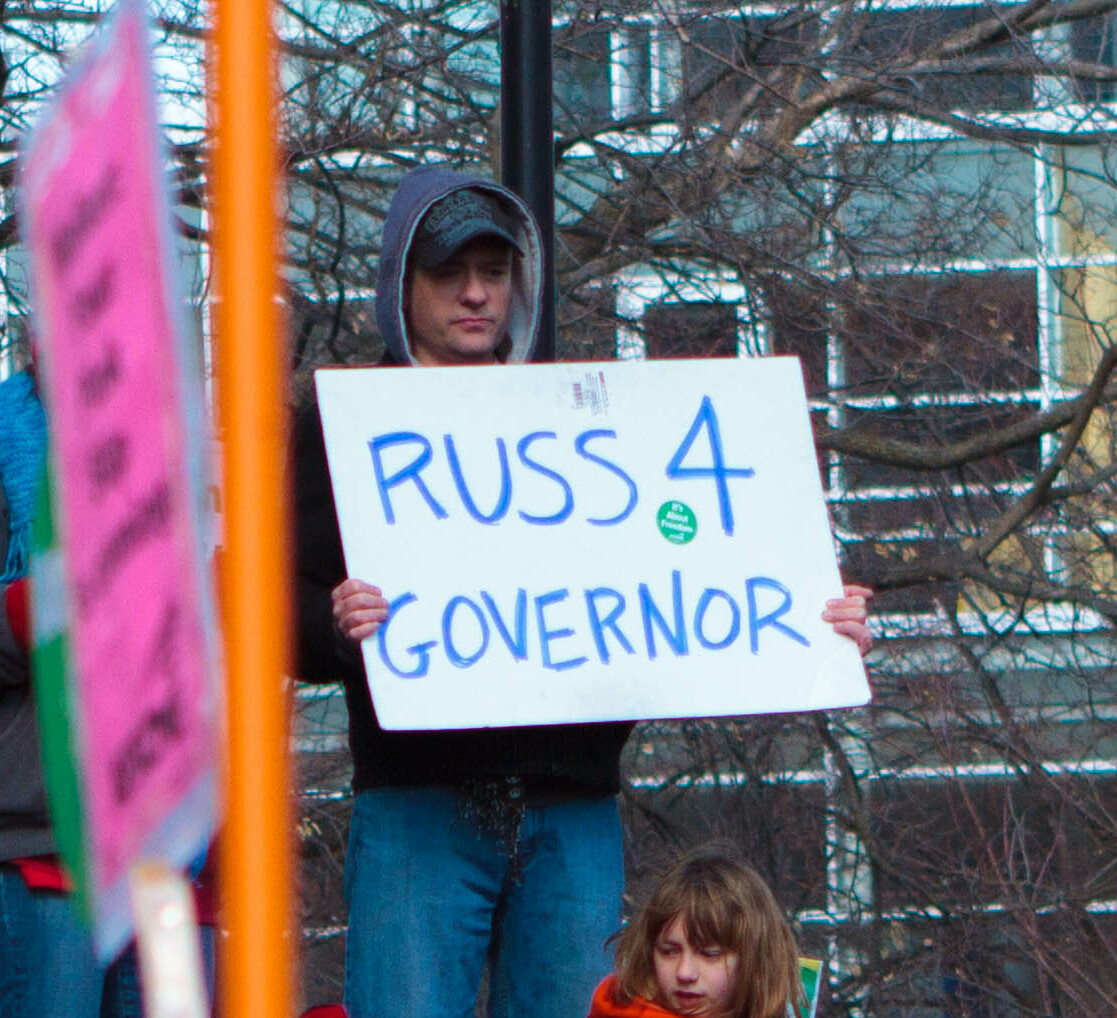
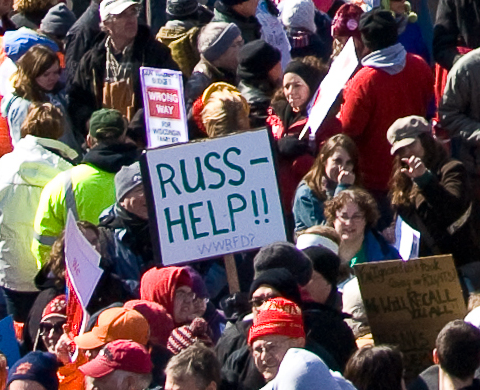
Feingold received encouragement to run for governor of Wisconsin in the 2012 recall election, but declined to run

In February 2011, Feingold formed Progressives United, a Political Action Committee, and an affiliated nonprofit entity called Progressives United Inc. Progressives United's stated aim was "directly and indirectly supporting candidates who stand up for our progressive ideals." From 2011 to 2015, the two groups raised and spent $10 million. The PAC has helped raise money for more than 50 progressive candidates, including the largest beneficiary, then-candidate Elizabeth Warren, who successfully defeated incumbent Scott Brown in 2012. Progressives United Inc. shut down in late 2014, and the Progressives United PAC suspended its fundraising activities in May 2015 in order to avoid the appearance of a conflict of interest with Feingold's 2016 Senate campaign.

Feingold had received encouragement from Democrats to run for office in an expected recall election against Wisconsin Governor Scott Walker, but in August 2011 he announced that he had no plans to run for office in 2012 in either a gubernatorial recall election or the election to Wisconsin's other U.S. senate seat.

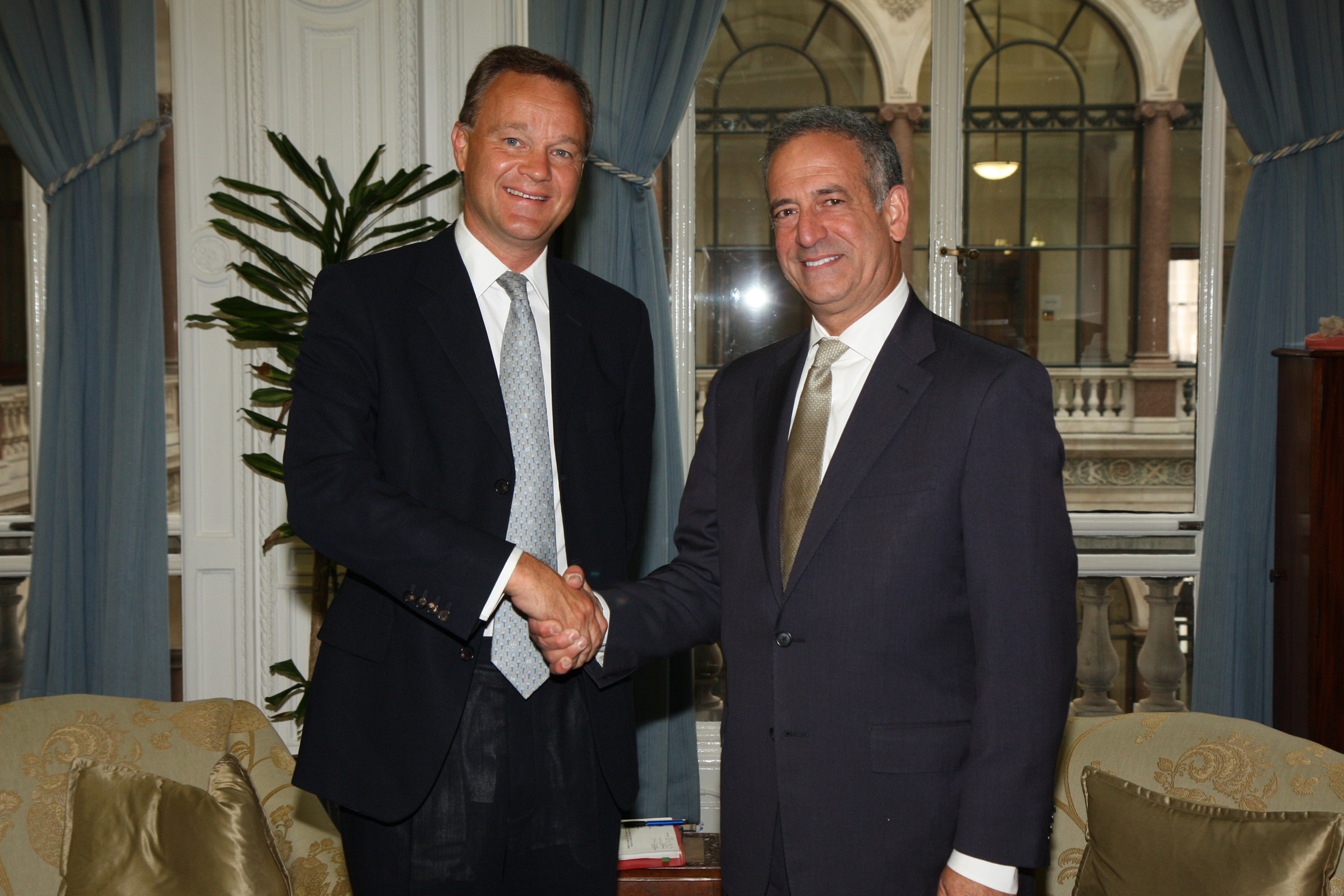
As special representative, Feingold meets with UK Foreign Office Minister Mark Simmonds

On June 18, 2013, Feingold was appointed United States Special Representative for the African Great Lakes region and the Democratic Republic of the Congo by United States Secretary of State John Kerry. He announced his departure from the position on February 24, 2015.

In 2016, Feingold ran for his former Senate seat and lost the election to Johnson again.

In November 2019, Feingold became a member of the ReFormers Caucus of Issue One.

In February 2020, Feingold was named president of the American Constitution Society. In that role, he worked to include the Equal Rights Amendment in the Constitution, arguing it is already part of the document. He stepped down from the position in 2025.

Since 2019, Feingold has worked with the Campaign for Nature and chaired the Campaign for Nature's Global Steering Committee. The Campaign for Nature is a global campaign calling for protection of at least 30% of the world's land and sea by 2030, protecting and promoting the rights of indigenous peoples and local communities, and increasing nature finance. The group's Global Steering Committee was formed in 2019 and is composed of former heads of state, foreign ministers, key leaders, and diplomats from around the world. Among other venues, Feingold has advocated for the Campaign for Nature on podcasts.

In 2022, Feingold and attorney Peter Prindiville coauthored The Constitution in Jeopardy, a book about the dangers of a convention to revise the Constitution. The American Bar Association listed the book among its finalists for the association's 2023 Silver Gavel Awards.

== Personal life ==
Feingold resides in Middleton, Wisconsin. He is a member of Beth Hillel Temple in Kenosha, Wisconsin, where his sister, Dena Feingold, is rabbi.

Feingold was married to Sue Levine from 1977 until 1986. They had two children. He married Mary Speerschneider in 1991; in 2005, the couple announced they would divorce. In 2013, Feingold married Christine Ferdinand, a fellow at Magdalen College, Oxford.

In 2011, Feingold received a Freedom Medal from the Roosevelt Institute.

== Electoral history ==
=== Wisconsin Senate (1982, 1986, 1990) ===
Year	Election	Date	Elected				Defeated				Total	Plurality
1982	Primary	Sep. 14	Russell D. Feingold	Democratic	5,930	52.61%	Scott Hassett	Dem.	8,918	47.39%	11,272	588
1982	General	Nov. 2	Russell D. Feingold	Democratic	23,346	50.03%	Everett Bidwell (inc)	Rep.	23,316	49.97%	46,662	30
1986	General	Nov. 4	Russell D. Feingold (inc)	Democratic	31,810	62.55%	Jean T. Erickson	Rep.	19,047	37.45%	50,857	12,763
1990	General	Nov. 6	Russell D. Feingold (inc)	Democratic	32,900	100.0%	--unopposed--				32,900	

=== U.S. Senate (1992–2016) ===
Year	Election	Date	Elected				Defeated				Total	Plurality
1992	Primary	Sep. 8	Russell D. Feingold	Democratic	367,746	69.72%	Jim Moody	Dem.	74,472	14.12%	527,485	293,274
1992	Primary	Sep. 8	Russell D. Feingold	Democratic	367,746	69.72%	Joseph Checota	Dem.	71,570	13.57%	527,485	293,274
1992	Primary	Sep. 8	Russell D. Feingold	Democratic	367,746	69.72%	Thomas Keller	Dem.	8,678	1.65%	527,485	293,274
1992	Primary	Sep. 8	Russell D. Feingold	Democratic	367,746	69.72%	Edmond E. Hou-Seye	Dem.	5,019	0.95%	527,485	293,274
1992	General	Nov. 3	Russell D. Feingold	Democratic	1,290,662	52.58%	Robert W. Kasten Jr. (inc)	Rep.	1,129,599	46.02%	2,454,665	161,063
1992	General	Nov. 3	Russell D. Feingold	Democratic	1,290,662	52.58%	Patrick W. Johnson	Ind.	16,513	0.67%	2,454,665	161,063
1992	General	Nov. 3	Russell D. Feingold	Democratic	1,290,662	52.58%	William Bittner	Lib.	9,147	0.37%	2,454,665	161,063
1992	General	Nov. 3	Russell D. Feingold	Democratic	1,290,662	52.58%	Mervin A. Hanson Sr.	Ind.	3,264	0.13%	2,454,665	161,063
1992	General	Nov. 3	Russell D. Feingold	Democratic	1,290,662	52.58%	Robert L. Kundert	Ind.	2,747	0.11%	2,454,665	161,063
1992	General	Nov. 3	Russell D. Feingold	Democratic	1,290,662	52.58%	Joseph Selliken	Ind.	2,733	0.11%	2,454,665	161,063
1998	General	Nov. 3	Russell D. Feingold (inc)	Democratic	890,059	50.55%	Mark Neumann	Rep.	852,272	48.40%	1,760,836	37,787
1998	General	Nov. 3	Russell D. Feingold (inc)	Democratic	890,059	50.55%	Robert R. Raymond	Tax.	7,942	0.45%	1,760,836	37,787
1998	General	Nov. 3	Russell D. Feingold (inc)	Democratic	890,059	50.55%	Tom Ender	Lib.	5,591	0.32%	1,760,836	37,787
1998	General	Nov. 3	Russell D. Feingold (inc)	Democratic	890,059	50.55%	Eugene A. Hem	Ind.	4,266	0.24%	1,760,836	37,787
2004	General	Nov. 2	Russell D. Feingold (inc)	Democratic	1,632,697	55.35%	Tim Michels	Rep.	1,301,183	44.11%	2,949,743	331,514
2004	General	Nov. 2	Russell D. Feingold (inc)	Democratic	1,632,697	55.35%	Arif Khan	Lib.	8,367	0.28%	2,949,743	331,514
2004	General	Nov. 2	Russell D. Feingold (inc)	Democratic	1,632,697	55.35%	Eugene A. Hem	Ind.	6,662	0.23%	2,949,743	331,514
2010	General	Nov. 2	Ron Johnson	Republican	1,125,999	51.86%	Russell D. Feingold (inc)	Dem.	1,020,958	47.02%	2,171,331	105,041
2010	General	Nov. 2	Ron Johnson	Republican	1,125,999	51.86%	Rob Taylor	Con.	23,473	1.08%	2,171,331	105,041
2010	General	Nov. 2	Ron Johnson	Republican	1,125,999	51.86%	Ernest J. Pagels Jr. (write-in)	Ind.	134	0.01%	2,171,331	105,041
2010	General	Nov. 2	Ron Johnson	Republican	1,125,999	51.86%	Michael D. LaForest (write-in)	Ind.	129	0.01%	2,171,331	105,041
2016	Primary	Aug. 9	Russell D. Feingold	Democratic	303,791	90.13%	Scott Harbach	Dem.	33,096	9.82%	337,076	270,695
2016	General	Nov. 8	Ron Johnson (inc)	Republican	1,479,471	50.17%	Russell D. Feingold	Dem.	1,380,335	46.81%	2,948,741	99,136
2016	General	Nov. 8	Ron Johnson (inc)	Republican	1,479,471	50.17%	Phillip N. Anderson	Lib.	87,531	2.97%	2,948,741	99,136
2016	General	Nov. 8	Ron Johnson (inc)	Republican	1,479,471	50.17%	John Schiess (write-in)	Rep.	8	0.00%	2,948,741	99,136

== See also ==
- List of Harvard University politicians
- List of Jewish members of the United States Congress

Party political offices
Preceded by Ed Garvey	Democratic nominee for U.S. Senator from Wisconsin (Class 3); 1992, 1998, 2004, 2010, 2016	Succeeded by Mandela Barnes
U.S. Senate
Preceded by Bob Kasten	United States Senator (Class 3) from Wisconsin; 1993–2011; Served alongside: Herb Kohl	Succeeded by Ron Johnson
Honorary titles
Preceded by Don Nickles	Baby of the Senate; 1993–1995	Succeeded by Rick Santorum
Diplomatic posts
Preceded by Barrie Walkley	United States Special Envoy for the African Great Lakes and the Congo-Kinshasa; 2013–2015	Succeeded by Tom Perriello
U.S. order of precedence (ceremonial)
Preceded by Phil Gramm as Former U.S. Senator	Order of precedence of the United States as Former U.S. Senator	Succeeded by Byron Dorgan as Former U.S. Senator
