= List of United States senators from Wisconsin =

Current delegation

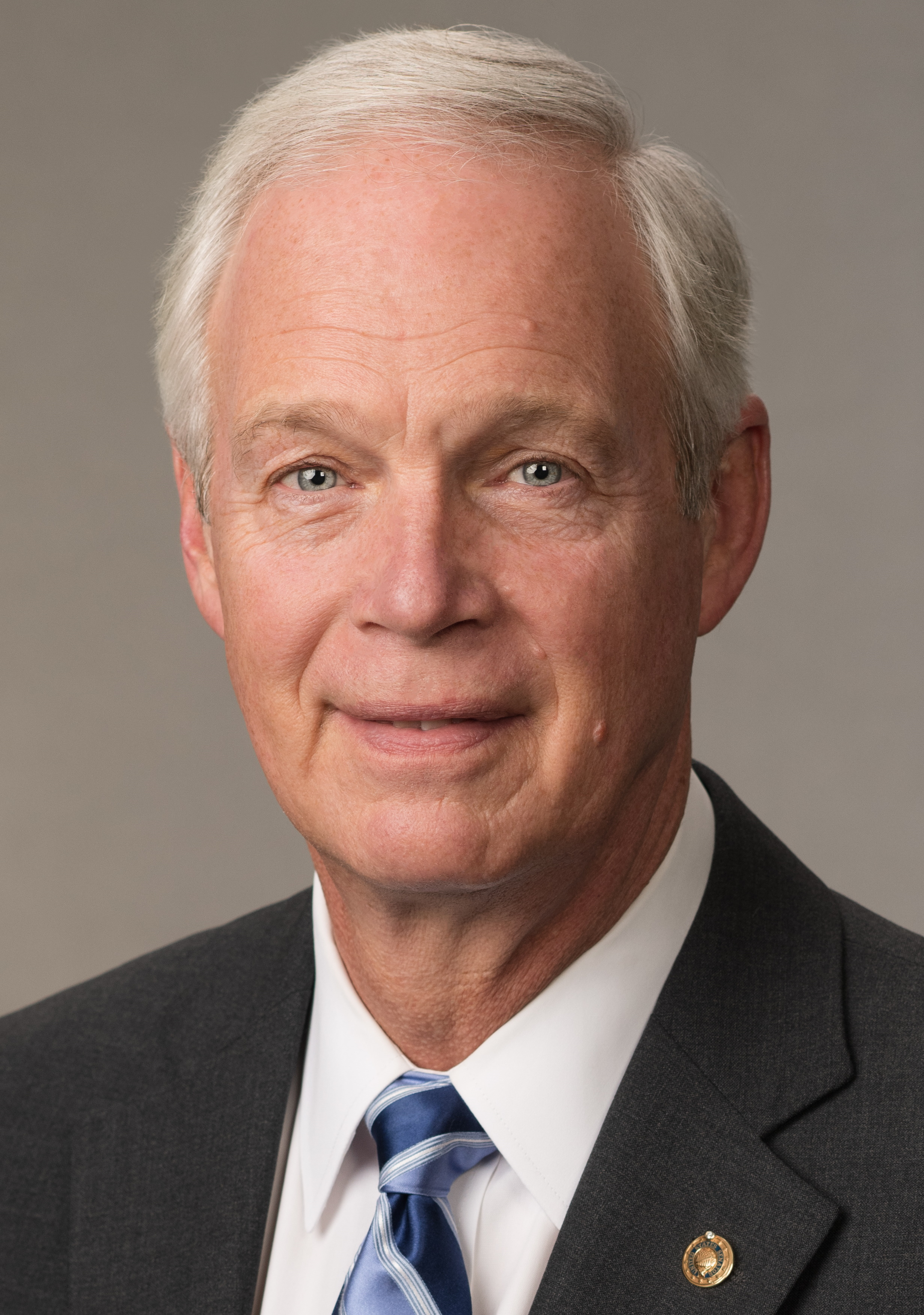
Ron Johnson (R)

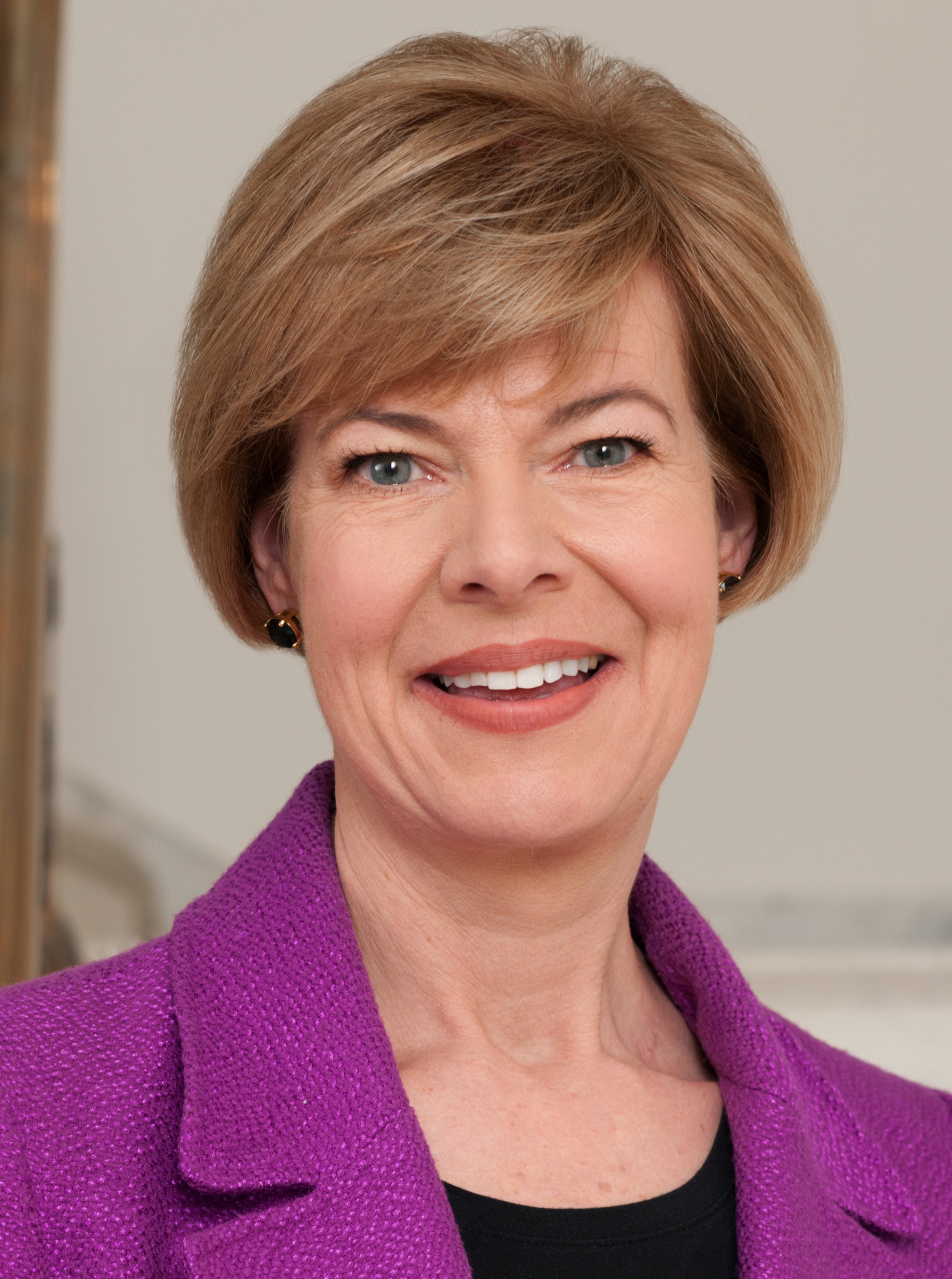
Tammy Baldwin (D)

(ordered by seniority)

Wisconsin was admitted to the Union on May 29, 1848. Its current U.S. senators are Republican Ron Johnson (since 2011) and Democrat Tammy Baldwin (since 2013), making it one of three states to have a split United States Senate delegation as of 2025. William Proxmire was the state's longest serving senator (served 1957–1989).

== List of senators ==
Class 1 Class 1 senators belong to the electoral cycle that most recently had regular elections in 2006, 2012, 2018, and 2024. The next election will be in 2030.						C	Class 3 Class 3 senators belong to the electoral cycle that most recently had regular elections in 2004, 2010, 2016, and 2022. The next election will be in 2028.					
#	Senator	Party	Dates in office	Electoral history	T	C	T	Electoral history	Dates in office	Party	Senator	#
Vacant			May 29, 1848 – Jun 8, 1848	Wisconsin elected its senators 10 days after statehood.	1	30th	1	Wisconsin elected its senators 10 days after statehood.	May 29, 1848 – Jun 8, 1848	Vacant		
1	Henry Dodge (Dodgeville)	Democratic	Jun 8, 1848 – Mar 3, 1857	Elected in 1848.	1	30th	1	Elected in 1848.	Jun 8, 1848 – Mar 3, 1855	Democratic	Isaac P. Walker (Milwaukee)	1
1	Henry Dodge (Dodgeville)	Democratic	Jun 8, 1848 – Mar 3, 1857	Elected in 1848.	1	31st	2	Re-elected in 1849. Retired.	Jun 8, 1848 – Mar 3, 1855	Democratic	Isaac P. Walker (Milwaukee)	1
1	Henry Dodge (Dodgeville)	Democratic	Jun 8, 1848 – Mar 3, 1857	Re-elected in 1851. Retired.	2	32nd	2	Re-elected in 1849. Retired.	Jun 8, 1848 – Mar 3, 1855	Democratic	Isaac P. Walker (Milwaukee)	1
1	Henry Dodge (Dodgeville)	Democratic	Jun 8, 1848 – Mar 3, 1857	Re-elected in 1851. Retired.	2	33rd	2	Re-elected in 1849. Retired.	Jun 8, 1848 – Mar 3, 1855	Democratic	Isaac P. Walker (Milwaukee)	1
1	Henry Dodge (Dodgeville)	Democratic	Jun 8, 1848 – Mar 3, 1857	Re-elected in 1851. Retired.	2	34th	3	Elected in 1855. Retired.	Mar 4, 1855 – Mar 3, 1861	Republican	Charles Durkee (Kenosha)	2
2	James R. Doolittle (Racine)	Republican	Mar 4, 1857 – Mar 3, 1869	Elected in 1857.	3	35th	3	Elected in 1855. Retired.	Mar 4, 1855 – Mar 3, 1861	Republican	Charles Durkee (Kenosha)	2
2	James R. Doolittle (Racine)	Republican	Mar 4, 1857 – Mar 3, 1869	Elected in 1857.	3	36th	3	Elected in 1855. Retired.	Mar 4, 1855 – Mar 3, 1861	Republican	Charles Durkee (Kenosha)	2
2	James R. Doolittle (Racine)	Republican	Mar 4, 1857 – Mar 3, 1869	Elected in 1857.	3	37th	4	Elected in 1861.	Mar 4, 1861 – Mar 3, 1879	Republican	Timothy O. Howe (Green Bay)	3
2	James R. Doolittle (Racine)	Republican	Mar 4, 1857 – Mar 3, 1869	Re-elected in 1863. Retired.	4	38th	4	Elected in 1861.	Mar 4, 1861 – Mar 3, 1879	Republican	Timothy O. Howe (Green Bay)	3
2	James R. Doolittle (Racine)	Republican	Mar 4, 1857 – Mar 3, 1869	Re-elected in 1863. Retired.	4	39th	4	Elected in 1861.	Mar 4, 1861 – Mar 3, 1879	Republican	Timothy O. Howe (Green Bay)	3
2	James R. Doolittle (Racine)	Republican	Mar 4, 1857 – Mar 3, 1869	Re-elected in 1863. Retired.	4	40th	5	Re-elected in 1867.	Mar 4, 1861 – Mar 3, 1879	Republican	Timothy O. Howe (Green Bay)	3
3	Matthew H. Carpenter (Milwaukee)	Republican	Mar 4, 1869 – Mar 3, 1875	Elected in 1869. Lost re-election.	5	41st	5	Re-elected in 1867.	Mar 4, 1861 – Mar 3, 1879	Republican	Timothy O. Howe (Green Bay)	3
3	Matthew H. Carpenter (Milwaukee)	Republican	Mar 4, 1869 – Mar 3, 1875	Elected in 1869. Lost re-election.	5	42nd	5	Re-elected in 1867.	Mar 4, 1861 – Mar 3, 1879	Republican	Timothy O. Howe (Green Bay)	3
3	Matthew H. Carpenter (Milwaukee)	Republican	Mar 4, 1869 – Mar 3, 1875	Elected in 1869. Lost re-election.	5	43rd	6	Re-elected in 1872. Lost re-election.	Mar 4, 1861 – Mar 3, 1879	Republican	Timothy O. Howe (Green Bay)	3
4	Angus Cameron (La Crosse)	Republican	Mar 4, 1875 – Mar 3, 1881	Elected in 1875. Retired.	6	44th	6	Re-elected in 1872. Lost re-election.	Mar 4, 1861 – Mar 3, 1879	Republican	Timothy O. Howe (Green Bay)	3
4	Angus Cameron (La Crosse)	Republican	Mar 4, 1875 – Mar 3, 1881	Elected in 1875. Retired.	6	45th	6	Re-elected in 1872. Lost re-election.	Mar 4, 1861 – Mar 3, 1879	Republican	Timothy O. Howe (Green Bay)	3
4	Angus Cameron (La Crosse)	Republican	Mar 4, 1875 – Mar 3, 1881	Elected in 1875. Retired.	6	46th	7	Elected in 1879. Died.	Mar 4, 1879 – Feb 24, 1881	Republican	Matthew H. Carpenter (Milwaukee)	4
4	Angus Cameron (La Crosse)	Republican	Mar 4, 1875 – Mar 3, 1881	Elected in 1875. Retired.	6	46th	7		Feb 24, 1881 – Mar 14, 1881	Vacant		
5	Philetus Sawyer (Oshkosh)	Republican	Mar 4, 1881 – Mar 3, 1893	Elected in 1881.	7	47th	7		Feb 24, 1881 – Mar 14, 1881	Vacant		
5	Philetus Sawyer (Oshkosh)	Republican	Mar 4, 1881 – Mar 3, 1893	Elected in 1881.	7	47th	7	Elected to finish Carpenter's term. Retired.	Mar 14, 1881 – Mar 3, 1885	Republican	Angus Cameron (La Crosse)	5
5	Philetus Sawyer (Oshkosh)	Republican	Mar 4, 1881 – Mar 3, 1893	Elected in 1881.	7	48th	7	Elected to finish Carpenter's term. Retired.	Mar 14, 1881 – Mar 3, 1885	Republican	Angus Cameron (La Crosse)	5
5	Philetus Sawyer (Oshkosh)	Republican	Mar 4, 1881 – Mar 3, 1893	Elected in 1881.	7	49th	8	Elected in 1885. Lost re-election.	Mar 4, 1885 – Mar 3, 1891	Republican	John Coit Spooner (Hudson)	6
5	Philetus Sawyer (Oshkosh)	Republican	Mar 4, 1881 – Mar 3, 1893	Re-elected in 1887. Retired.	8	50th	8	Elected in 1885. Lost re-election.	Mar 4, 1885 – Mar 3, 1891	Republican	John Coit Spooner (Hudson)	6
5	Philetus Sawyer (Oshkosh)	Republican	Mar 4, 1881 – Mar 3, 1893	Re-elected in 1887. Retired.	8	51st	8	Elected in 1885. Lost re-election.	Mar 4, 1885 – Mar 3, 1891	Republican	John Coit Spooner (Hudson)	6
5	Philetus Sawyer (Oshkosh)	Republican	Mar 4, 1881 – Mar 3, 1893	Re-elected in 1887. Retired.	8	52nd	9	Elected in 1891. Lost renomination.	Mar 4, 1891 – Mar 3, 1897	Democratic	William F. Vilas (Madison)	7
6	John L. Mitchell (Milwaukee)	Democratic	Mar 4, 1893 – Mar 3, 1899	Elected in 1893. Retired.	9	53rd	9	Elected in 1891. Lost renomination.	Mar 4, 1891 – Mar 3, 1897	Democratic	William F. Vilas (Madison)	7
6	John L. Mitchell (Milwaukee)	Democratic	Mar 4, 1893 – Mar 3, 1899	Elected in 1893. Retired.	9	54th	9	Elected in 1891. Lost renomination.	Mar 4, 1891 – Mar 3, 1897	Democratic	William F. Vilas (Madison)	7
6	John L. Mitchell (Milwaukee)	Democratic	Mar 4, 1893 – Mar 3, 1899	Elected in 1893. Retired.	9	55th	10	Elected in 1897.	Mar 4, 1897 – Apr 30, 1907	Republican	John Coit Spooner (Madison)	8
7	Joseph V. Quarles (Milwaukee)	Republican	Mar 4, 1899 – Mar 3, 1905	Elected in 1899. Retired.	10	56th	10	Elected in 1897.	Mar 4, 1897 – Apr 30, 1907	Republican	John Coit Spooner (Madison)	8
7	Joseph V. Quarles (Milwaukee)	Republican	Mar 4, 1899 – Mar 3, 1905	Elected in 1899. Retired.	10	57th	10	Elected in 1897.	Mar 4, 1897 – Apr 30, 1907	Republican	John Coit Spooner (Madison)	8
7	Joseph V. Quarles (Milwaukee)	Republican	Mar 4, 1899 – Mar 3, 1905	Elected in 1899. Retired.	10	58th	11	Re-elected in 1903. Resigned.	Mar 4, 1897 – Apr 30, 1907	Republican	John Coit Spooner (Madison)	8
8	Robert M. La Follette (Madison)	Republican	Jan 4, 1906 – Jun 18, 1925	Elected in 1905. Did not assume office until Jan 4, 1906 after resigning as Governor of Wisconsin.	11	59th	11	Re-elected in 1903. Resigned.	Mar 4, 1897 – Apr 30, 1907	Republican	John Coit Spooner (Madison)	8
8	Robert M. La Follette (Madison)	Republican	Jan 4, 1906 – Jun 18, 1925	Elected in 1905. Did not assume office until Jan 4, 1906 after resigning as Governor of Wisconsin.	11	60th	11	Re-elected in 1903. Resigned.	Mar 4, 1897 – Apr 30, 1907	Republican	John Coit Spooner (Madison)	8
8	Robert M. La Follette (Madison)	Republican	Jan 4, 1906 – Jun 18, 1925	Elected in 1905. Did not assume office until Jan 4, 1906 after resigning as Governor of Wisconsin.	11	60th	11		Apr 30, 1907 – May 17, 1907	Vacant		
8	Robert M. La Follette (Madison)	Republican	Jan 4, 1906 – Jun 18, 1925	Elected in 1905. Did not assume office until Jan 4, 1906 after resigning as Governor of Wisconsin.	11	60th	11	Elected to finish Spooner's term.	May 17, 1907 – Mar 3, 1915	Republican	Isaac Stephenson (Marinette)	9
8	Robert M. La Follette (Madison)	Republican	Jan 4, 1906 – Jun 18, 1925	Elected in 1905. Did not assume office until Jan 4, 1906 after resigning as Governor of Wisconsin.	11	61st	12	Re-elected in 1909. Retired.	May 17, 1907 – Mar 3, 1915	Republican	Isaac Stephenson (Marinette)	9
8	Robert M. La Follette (Madison)	Republican	Jan 4, 1906 – Jun 18, 1925	Re-elected in 1911.	12	62nd	12	Re-elected in 1909. Retired.	May 17, 1907 – Mar 3, 1915	Republican	Isaac Stephenson (Marinette)	9
8	Robert M. La Follette (Madison)	Republican	Jan 4, 1906 – Jun 18, 1925	Re-elected in 1911.	12	63rd	12	Re-elected in 1909. Retired.	May 17, 1907 – Mar 3, 1915	Republican	Isaac Stephenson (Marinette)	9
8	Robert M. La Follette (Madison)	Republican	Jan 4, 1906 – Jun 18, 1925	Re-elected in 1911.	12	64th	13	Elected in 1914. Died.	Mar 4, 1915 – Oct 21, 1917	Democratic	Paul O. Husting (Mayville)	10
8	Robert M. La Follette (Madison)	Republican	Jan 4, 1906 – Jun 18, 1925	Re-elected in 1916.	13	65th	13	Elected in 1914. Died.	Mar 4, 1915 – Oct 21, 1917	Democratic	Paul O. Husting (Mayville)	10
8	Robert M. La Follette (Madison)	Republican	Jan 4, 1906 – Jun 18, 1925	Re-elected in 1916.	13	65th	13		Oct 21, 1917 – Apr 18, 1918	Vacant		
8	Robert M. La Follette (Madison)	Republican	Jan 4, 1906 – Jun 18, 1925	Re-elected in 1916.	13	65th	13	Elected in 1918 to finish Husting's term.	Apr 18, 1918 – Mar 3, 1927	Republican	Irvine Lenroot (Superior)	11
8	Robert M. La Follette (Madison)	Republican	Jan 4, 1906 – Jun 18, 1925	Re-elected in 1916.	13	66th	13	Elected in 1918 to finish Husting's term.	Apr 18, 1918 – Mar 3, 1927	Republican	Irvine Lenroot (Superior)	11
8	Robert M. La Follette (Madison)	Republican	Jan 4, 1906 – Jun 18, 1925	Re-elected in 1916.	13	67th	14	Re-elected in 1920. Lost renomination.	Apr 18, 1918 – Mar 3, 1927	Republican	Irvine Lenroot (Superior)	11
8	Robert M. La Follette (Madison)	Republican	Jan 4, 1906 – Jun 18, 1925	Re-elected in 1922. Died.	14	68th	14	Re-elected in 1920. Lost renomination.	Apr 18, 1918 – Mar 3, 1927	Republican	Irvine Lenroot (Superior)	11
8	Robert M. La Follette (Madison)	Republican	Jan 4, 1906 – Jun 18, 1925	Re-elected in 1922. Died.	14	69th	14	Re-elected in 1920. Lost renomination.	Apr 18, 1918 – Mar 3, 1927	Republican	Irvine Lenroot (Superior)	11
Vacant			Jun 18, 1925 – Sep 30, 1925		14	69th	14	Re-elected in 1920. Lost renomination.	Apr 18, 1918 – Mar 3, 1927	Republican	Irvine Lenroot (Superior)	11
9	Robert M. La Follette Jr. (Madison)	Republican	Sep 30, 1925 – Jan 3, 1947	Elected to finish his father's term	14	69th	14	Re-elected in 1920. Lost renomination.	Apr 18, 1918 – Mar 3, 1927	Republican	Irvine Lenroot (Superior)	11
9	Robert M. La Follette Jr. (Madison)	Republican	Sep 30, 1925 – Jan 3, 1947	Elected to finish his father's term	14	70th	15	Elected in 1926. Lost renomination.	Mar 4, 1927 – Mar 3, 1933	Republican	John J. Blaine (Boscobel)	12
9	Robert M. La Follette Jr. (Madison)	Republican	Sep 30, 1925 – Jan 3, 1947	Re-elected in 1928.	15	71st	15	Elected in 1926. Lost renomination.	Mar 4, 1927 – Mar 3, 1933	Republican	John J. Blaine (Boscobel)	12
9	Robert M. La Follette Jr. (Madison)	Republican	Sep 30, 1925 – Jan 3, 1947	Re-elected in 1928.	15	72nd	15	Elected in 1926. Lost renomination.	Mar 4, 1927 – Mar 3, 1933	Republican	John J. Blaine (Boscobel)	12
9	Robert M. La Follette Jr. (Madison)	Republican	Sep 30, 1925 – Jan 3, 1947	Re-elected in 1928.	15	73rd	16	Elected in 1932. Lost re-election.	Mar 4, 1933 – Jan 3, 1939	Democratic	F. Ryan Duffy (Fond du Lac)	13
9	Robert M. La Follette Jr. (Madison)	Progressive	Sep 30, 1925 – Jan 3, 1947	Re-elected in 1934.	16	74th	16	Elected in 1932. Lost re-election.	Mar 4, 1933 – Jan 3, 1939	Democratic	F. Ryan Duffy (Fond du Lac)	13
9	Robert M. La Follette Jr. (Madison)	Progressive	Sep 30, 1925 – Jan 3, 1947	Re-elected in 1934.	16	75th	16	Elected in 1932. Lost re-election.	Mar 4, 1933 – Jan 3, 1939	Democratic	F. Ryan Duffy (Fond du Lac)	13
9	Robert M. La Follette Jr. (Madison)	Progressive	Sep 30, 1925 – Jan 3, 1947	Re-elected in 1934.	16	76th	17	Elected in 1938.	Jan 3, 1939 – Jan 3, 1963	Republican	Alexander Wiley (Chippewa Falls)	14
9	Robert M. La Follette Jr. (Madison)	Progressive	Sep 30, 1925 – Jan 3, 1947	Re-elected in 1940. Lost nomination as a Republican.	17	77th	17	Elected in 1938.	Jan 3, 1939 – Jan 3, 1963	Republican	Alexander Wiley (Chippewa Falls)	14
9	Robert M. La Follette Jr. (Madison)	Progressive	Sep 30, 1925 – Jan 3, 1947	Re-elected in 1940. Lost nomination as a Republican.	17	78th	17	Elected in 1938.	Jan 3, 1939 – Jan 3, 1963	Republican	Alexander Wiley (Chippewa Falls)	14
9	Robert M. La Follette Jr. (Madison)	Progressive	Sep 30, 1925 – Jan 3, 1947	Re-elected in 1940. Lost nomination as a Republican.	17	79th	18	Re-elected in 1944.	Jan 3, 1939 – Jan 3, 1963	Republican	Alexander Wiley (Chippewa Falls)	14
10	Joseph McCarthy (Appleton)	Republican	Jan 3, 1947 – May 2, 1957	Elected in 1946.	18	80th	18	Re-elected in 1944.	Jan 3, 1939 – Jan 3, 1963	Republican	Alexander Wiley (Chippewa Falls)	14
10	Joseph McCarthy (Appleton)	Republican	Jan 3, 1947 – May 2, 1957	Elected in 1946.	18	81st	18	Re-elected in 1944.	Jan 3, 1939 – Jan 3, 1963	Republican	Alexander Wiley (Chippewa Falls)	14
10	Joseph McCarthy (Appleton)	Republican	Jan 3, 1947 – May 2, 1957	Elected in 1946.	18	82nd	19	Re-elected in 1950.	Jan 3, 1939 – Jan 3, 1963	Republican	Alexander Wiley (Chippewa Falls)	14
10	Joseph McCarthy (Appleton)	Republican	Jan 3, 1947 – May 2, 1957	Re-elected in 1952. Died.	19	83rd	19	Re-elected in 1950.	Jan 3, 1939 – Jan 3, 1963	Republican	Alexander Wiley (Chippewa Falls)	14
10	Joseph McCarthy (Appleton)	Republican	Jan 3, 1947 – May 2, 1957	Re-elected in 1952. Died.	19	84th	19	Re-elected in 1950.	Jan 3, 1939 – Jan 3, 1963	Republican	Alexander Wiley (Chippewa Falls)	14
10	Joseph McCarthy (Appleton)	Republican	Jan 3, 1947 – May 2, 1957	Re-elected in 1952. Died.	19	85th	20	Re-elected in 1956. Lost re-election.	Jan 3, 1939 – Jan 3, 1963	Republican	Alexander Wiley (Chippewa Falls)	14
Vacant			May 2, 1957 – Aug 27, 1957		19	85th	20	Re-elected in 1956. Lost re-election.	Jan 3, 1939 – Jan 3, 1963	Republican	Alexander Wiley (Chippewa Falls)	14
11	William Proxmire (Madison)	Democratic	Aug 28, 1957 – Jan 3, 1989	Elected to finish McCarthy's term	19	85th	20	Re-elected in 1956. Lost re-election.	Jan 3, 1939 – Jan 3, 1963	Republican	Alexander Wiley (Chippewa Falls)	14
11	William Proxmire (Madison)	Democratic	Aug 28, 1957 – Jan 3, 1989	Re-elected in 1958.	20	86th	20	Re-elected in 1956. Lost re-election.	Jan 3, 1939 – Jan 3, 1963	Republican	Alexander Wiley (Chippewa Falls)	14
11	William Proxmire (Madison)	Democratic	Aug 28, 1957 – Jan 3, 1989	Re-elected in 1958.	20	87th	20	Re-elected in 1956. Lost re-election.	Jan 3, 1939 – Jan 3, 1963	Republican	Alexander Wiley (Chippewa Falls)	14
11	William Proxmire (Madison)	Democratic	Aug 28, 1957 – Jan 3, 1989	Re-elected in 1958.	20	88th	21	Elected in 1962.	Jan 3, 1963 – Jan 3, 1981	Democratic	Gaylord Nelson (Madison)	15
11	William Proxmire (Madison)	Democratic	Aug 28, 1957 – Jan 3, 1989	Re-elected in 1964.	21	89th	21	Elected in 1962.	Jan 3, 1963 – Jan 3, 1981	Democratic	Gaylord Nelson (Madison)	15
11	William Proxmire (Madison)	Democratic	Aug 28, 1957 – Jan 3, 1989	Re-elected in 1964.	21	90th	21	Elected in 1962.	Jan 3, 1963 – Jan 3, 1981	Democratic	Gaylord Nelson (Madison)	15
11	William Proxmire (Madison)	Democratic	Aug 28, 1957 – Jan 3, 1989	Re-elected in 1964.	21	91st	22	Re-elected in 1968.	Jan 3, 1963 – Jan 3, 1981	Democratic	Gaylord Nelson (Madison)	15
11	William Proxmire (Madison)	Democratic	Aug 28, 1957 – Jan 3, 1989	Re-elected in 1970.	22	92nd	22	Re-elected in 1968.	Jan 3, 1963 – Jan 3, 1981	Democratic	Gaylord Nelson (Madison)	15
11	William Proxmire (Madison)	Democratic	Aug 28, 1957 – Jan 3, 1989	Re-elected in 1970.	22	93rd	22	Re-elected in 1968.	Jan 3, 1963 – Jan 3, 1981	Democratic	Gaylord Nelson (Madison)	15
11	William Proxmire (Madison)	Democratic	Aug 28, 1957 – Jan 3, 1989	Re-elected in 1970.	22	94th	23	Re-elected in 1974. Lost re-election.	Jan 3, 1963 – Jan 3, 1981	Democratic	Gaylord Nelson (Madison)	15
11	William Proxmire (Madison)	Democratic	Aug 28, 1957 – Jan 3, 1989	Re-elected in 1976.	23	95th	23	Re-elected in 1974. Lost re-election.	Jan 3, 1963 – Jan 3, 1981	Democratic	Gaylord Nelson (Madison)	15
11	William Proxmire (Madison)	Democratic	Aug 28, 1957 – Jan 3, 1989	Re-elected in 1976.	23	96th	23	Re-elected in 1974. Lost re-election.	Jan 3, 1963 – Jan 3, 1981	Democratic	Gaylord Nelson (Madison)	15
11	William Proxmire (Madison)	Democratic	Aug 28, 1957 – Jan 3, 1989	Re-elected in 1976.	23	97th	24	Elected in 1980.	Jan 3, 1981 – Jan 3, 1993	Republican	Bob Kasten (Milwaukee)	16
11	William Proxmire (Madison)	Democratic	Aug 28, 1957 – Jan 3, 1989	Re-elected in 1982. Retired.	24	98th	24	Elected in 1980.	Jan 3, 1981 – Jan 3, 1993	Republican	Bob Kasten (Milwaukee)	16
11	William Proxmire (Madison)	Democratic	Aug 28, 1957 – Jan 3, 1989	Re-elected in 1982. Retired.	24	99th	24	Elected in 1980.	Jan 3, 1981 – Jan 3, 1993	Republican	Bob Kasten (Milwaukee)	16
11	William Proxmire (Madison)	Democratic	Aug 28, 1957 – Jan 3, 1989	Re-elected in 1982. Retired.	24	100th	25	Re-elected in 1986. Lost re-election.	Jan 3, 1981 – Jan 3, 1993	Republican	Bob Kasten (Milwaukee)	16
12	Herb Kohl (Milwaukee)	Democratic	Jan 3, 1989 – Jan 3, 2013	Elected in 1988.	25	101st	25	Re-elected in 1986. Lost re-election.	Jan 3, 1981 – Jan 3, 1993	Republican	Bob Kasten (Milwaukee)	16
12	Herb Kohl (Milwaukee)	Democratic	Jan 3, 1989 – Jan 3, 2013	Elected in 1988.	25	102nd	25	Re-elected in 1986. Lost re-election.	Jan 3, 1981 – Jan 3, 1993	Republican	Bob Kasten (Milwaukee)	16
12	Herb Kohl (Milwaukee)	Democratic	Jan 3, 1989 – Jan 3, 2013	Elected in 1988.	25	103rd	26	Elected in 1992.	Jan 3, 1993 – Jan 3, 2011	Democratic	Russ Feingold (Madison)	17
12	Herb Kohl (Milwaukee)	Democratic	Jan 3, 1989 – Jan 3, 2013	Re-elected in 1994.	26	104th	26	Elected in 1992.	Jan 3, 1993 – Jan 3, 2011	Democratic	Russ Feingold (Madison)	17
12	Herb Kohl (Milwaukee)	Democratic	Jan 3, 1989 – Jan 3, 2013	Re-elected in 1994.	26	105th	26	Elected in 1992.	Jan 3, 1993 – Jan 3, 2011	Democratic	Russ Feingold (Madison)	17
12	Herb Kohl (Milwaukee)	Democratic	Jan 3, 1989 – Jan 3, 2013	Re-elected in 1994.	26	106th	27	Re-elected in 1998.	Jan 3, 1993 – Jan 3, 2011	Democratic	Russ Feingold (Madison)	17
12	Herb Kohl (Milwaukee)	Democratic	Jan 3, 1989 – Jan 3, 2013	Re-elected in 2000.	27	107th	27	Re-elected in 1998.	Jan 3, 1993 – Jan 3, 2011	Democratic	Russ Feingold (Madison)	17
12	Herb Kohl (Milwaukee)	Democratic	Jan 3, 1989 – Jan 3, 2013	Re-elected in 2000.	27	108th	27	Re-elected in 1998.	Jan 3, 1993 – Jan 3, 2011	Democratic	Russ Feingold (Madison)	17
12	Herb Kohl (Milwaukee)	Democratic	Jan 3, 1989 – Jan 3, 2013	Re-elected in 2000.	27	109th	28	Re-elected in 2004. Lost re-election.	Jan 3, 1993 – Jan 3, 2011	Democratic	Russ Feingold (Madison)	17
12	Herb Kohl (Milwaukee)	Democratic	Jan 3, 1989 – Jan 3, 2013	Re-elected in 2006. Retired.	28	110th	28	Re-elected in 2004. Lost re-election.	Jan 3, 1993 – Jan 3, 2011	Democratic	Russ Feingold (Madison)	17
12	Herb Kohl (Milwaukee)	Democratic	Jan 3, 1989 – Jan 3, 2013	Re-elected in 2006. Retired.	28	111th	28	Re-elected in 2004. Lost re-election.	Jan 3, 1993 – Jan 3, 2011	Democratic	Russ Feingold (Madison)	17
12	Herb Kohl (Milwaukee)	Democratic	Jan 3, 1989 – Jan 3, 2013	Re-elected in 2006. Retired.	28	112th	29	Elected in 2010.	Jan 3, 2011 – present	Republican	Ron Johnson (Oshkosh)	18
13	Tammy Baldwin (Madison)	Democratic	Jan 3, 2013 – present	Elected in 2012.	29	113th	29	Elected in 2010.	Jan 3, 2011 – present	Republican	Ron Johnson (Oshkosh)	18
13	Tammy Baldwin (Madison)	Democratic	Jan 3, 2013 – present	Elected in 2012.	29	114th	29	Elected in 2010.	Jan 3, 2011 – present	Republican	Ron Johnson (Oshkosh)	18
13	Tammy Baldwin (Madison)	Democratic	Jan 3, 2013 – present	Elected in 2012.	29	115th	30	Re-elected in 2016.	Jan 3, 2011 – present	Republican	Ron Johnson (Oshkosh)	18
13	Tammy Baldwin (Madison)	Democratic	Jan 3, 2013 – present	Re-elected in 2018.	30	116th	30	Re-elected in 2016.	Jan 3, 2011 – present	Republican	Ron Johnson (Oshkosh)	18
13	Tammy Baldwin (Madison)	Democratic	Jan 3, 2013 – present	Re-elected in 2018.	30	117th	30	Re-elected in 2016.	Jan 3, 2011 – present	Republican	Ron Johnson (Oshkosh)	18
13	Tammy Baldwin (Madison)	Democratic	Jan 3, 2013 – present	Re-elected in 2018.	30	118th	31	Re-elected in 2022.	Jan 3, 2011 – present	Republican	Ron Johnson (Oshkosh)	18
13	Tammy Baldwin (Madison)	Democratic	Jan 3, 2013 – present	Re-elected in 2024.	31	119th	31	Re-elected in 2022.	Jan 3, 2011 – present	Republican	Ron Johnson (Oshkosh)	18
13	Tammy Baldwin (Madison)	Democratic	Jan 3, 2013 – present	Re-elected in 2024.	31	120th	31	Re-elected in 2022.	Jan 3, 2011 – present	Republican	Ron Johnson (Oshkosh)	18
13	Tammy Baldwin (Madison)	Democratic	Jan 3, 2013 – present	Re-elected in 2024.	31	121st	32	To be determined in the 2028 election.				
To be determined in the 2030 election.					32	122nd	32	To be determined in the 2028 election.				

== See also ==
- Elections in Wisconsin
- List of United States representatives from Wisconsin
- Wisconsin's congressional delegations
