= JUSTICE Act (S. 1686) =

Failed US Senate bill

The JUSTICE Act (S. 1686; Judicious Use of Surveillance Tools In Counterterrorism Efforts Act) was a proposed bill designed to amend the FISA Amendments Act and Patriot Act by reducing surveillance powers and strengthening protections of civil liberty. It was written by Russ Feingold and introduced in the United States Congress on September 17, 2009, but did not receive a vote.

== Background ==
With the sunset provisions of the Patriot Act expiring on December 31, 2009, the JUSTICE Act attempted to amend sections 206 and 215 before the reauthorization of them.

== Overview ==
=== Proposed amendments ===
- protecting the privacy of records by amending national security letter authority so records can only be accessed they have relations to a terror suspect or spy.
- protecting First Amendment rights by requiring the government to show national security would be jeopardized if the recipient of a gag order that comes with national security letters or Patriot Act section 215 orders is not gagged.
- protecting the privacy of homes and businesses by requiring searches to give prior notice in non-urgent circumstances.
- amending the material support statute by only prosecuting people who knowingly or intentionally gave items of value to support terrorist acts.

==== Amendments to Section 215 of the Patriot Act ====
- requiring the government to show records are related to a terrorist or spy before obtaining a secret warrant.

==== Amendments to Section 206 of the Patriot Act ====
- protecting the privacy of communications by requiring wiretaps to name the person or place that is being wiretapped.

==== Amendments to the FISA Amendments Act ====
- protecting the privacy of communications by requiring collections of phone calls and emails to be targeted and only viewed when there is a reason to suspect someone is related to terrorism.
- reversing legal immunity for telecommunications companies assisting with warrant-less wiretapping.

== See also ==
- Patriot Act
- FISA Amendments Act
