= 2004 United States Senate election in Wisconsin =

- November 2, 2004
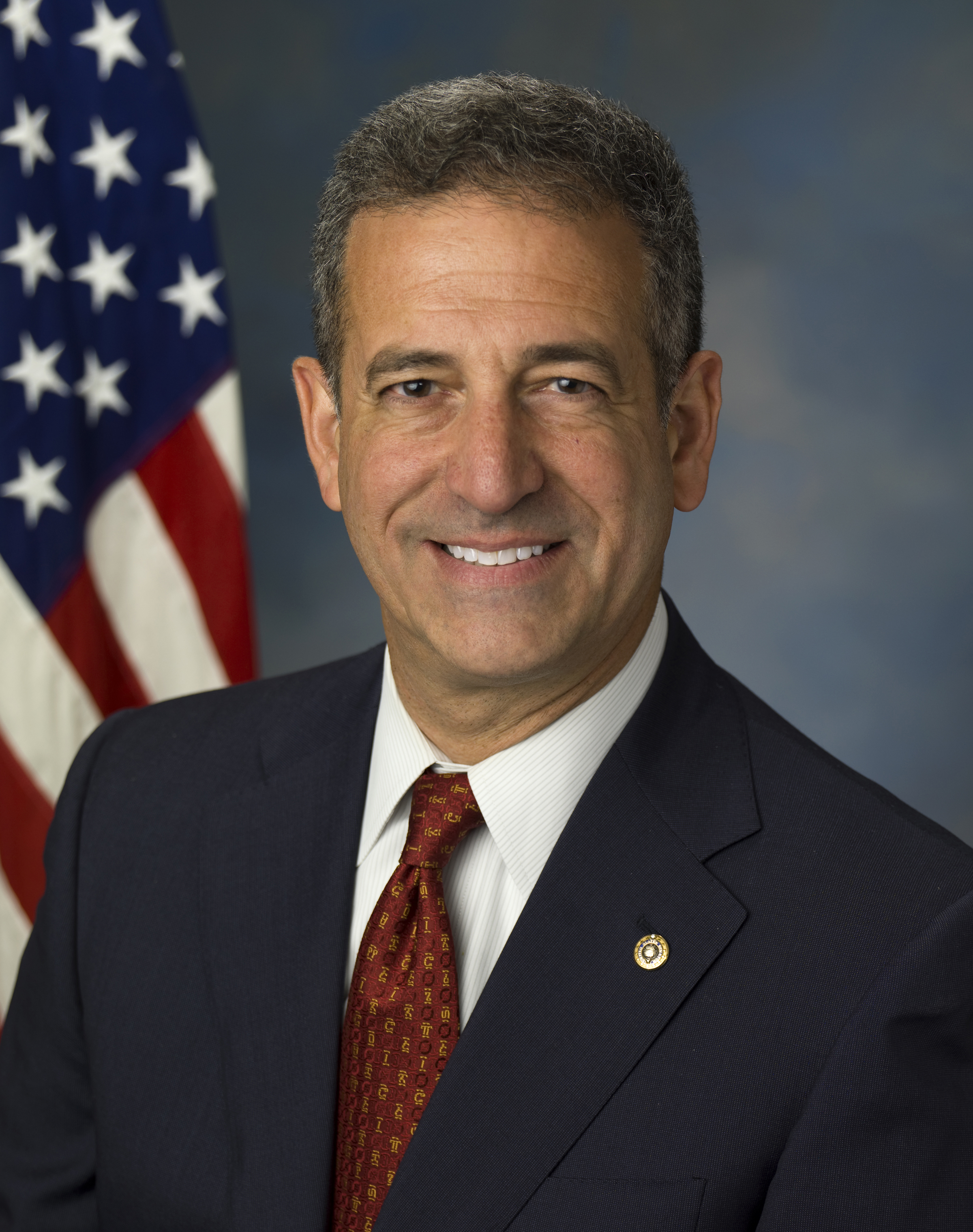

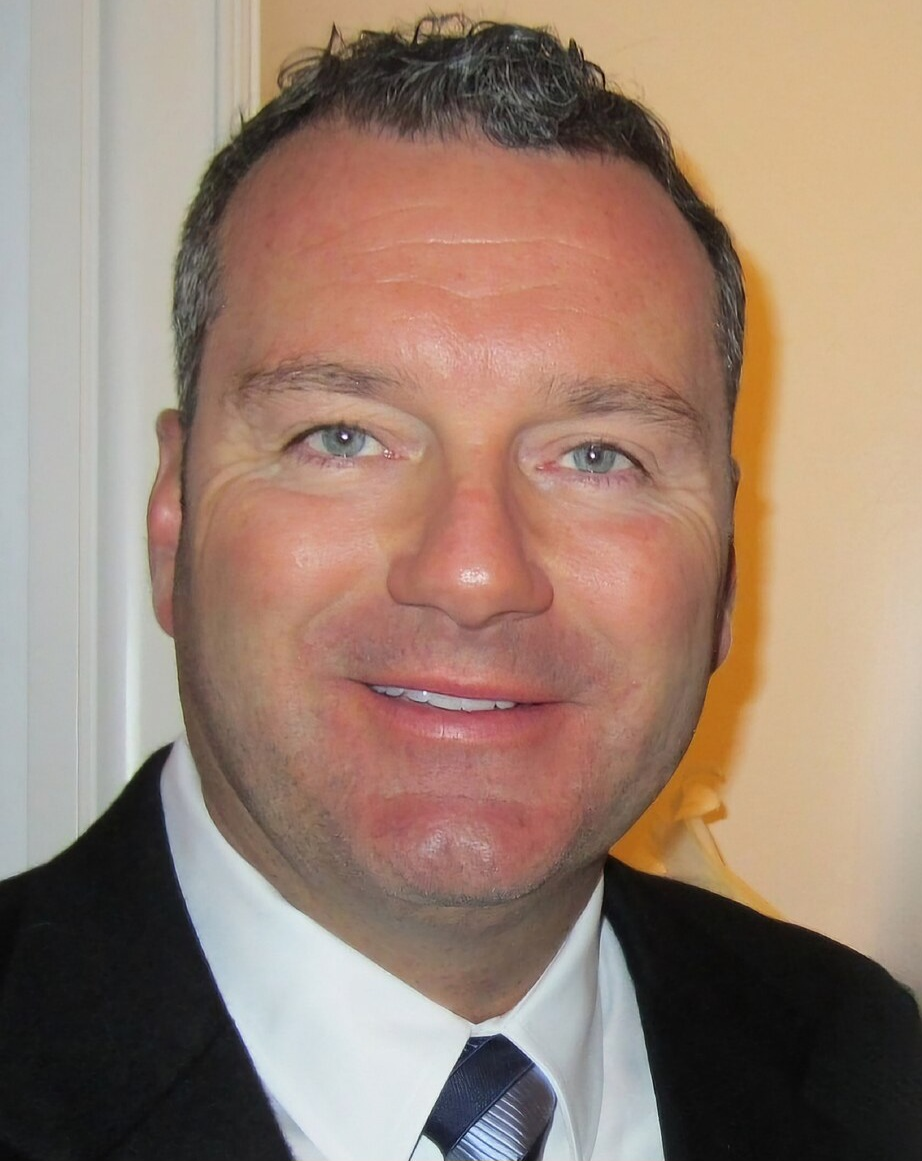
Nominee	Russ Feingold	Tim Michels
Party	Democratic	Republican
Popular vote	1,632,697	1,301,183
Percentage	55.35%	44.11%
- Feingold: 40–50% 50–60% 60–70% 70–80% 80–90% >90% Michels: 40–50% 50–60% 60–70% 70–80% 80–90% >90% Tie
U.S. senator before election
Russ Feingold
Democratic
Elected U.S. Senator
Russ Feingold
Democratic

The 2004 United States Senate election in Wisconsin was held on November 2, 2004. Incumbent Senator Russ Feingold won re-election to a third term with more than 55% of the vote against Republican Tim Michels, even as Democrat John Kerry won the state in the concurrent presidential race with just 49.7% of the vote and by only a 0.38% margin. Michels later ran unsuccessfully for Governor of Wisconsin in 2022.

As of 2026, this is the last time Democrats won the Class 3 Senate seat from Wisconsin.

== Candidates ==
=== Democratic ===
- Russ Feingold, incumbent U.S. Senator

Democratic primary results
Party	Candidate	Votes	%
Democratic	Russ Feingold	251,915	99.66%
Democratic	Scattering	862	0.34%
Total votes		252,777	100.00%

=== Republican ===
- Russ Darrow
- Robert Gerald Lorge
- Tim Michels, businessman and army veteran
- Robert Welch, State Senator

Republican Primary results
Party	Candidate	Votes	%
Republican	Tim Michels	183,654	42.43%
Republican	Russ Darrow	130,088	30.05%
Republican	Robert Welch	99,971	23.09%
Republican	Robert Gerald Lorge	18,809	4.35%
Republican	Scattering	350	0.08%
Total votes		432,872	100.0%

=== Minor candidates ===
==== Libertarian ====
- Arif Khan, entrepreneur

==== Independent ====
- Eugene Hem, perennial candidate and former educator

== General election ==
=== Campaign ===
Michels insisted he had more real world experience than Feingold, someone he called an "extreme liberal" who was out of touch with Wisconsin voters. Feingold attacked back by saying that any Republican would be a rubber stamp for President Bush. The incumbent had $2.2 million in the bank, while Michels had already spent $1 million in the primary and had only about $150,000 left.

During both the primary and general election campaigns, Michels ran a series of ads attacking Feingold for his status as the sole senator to oppose the 2001 Patriot Act. One of his earliest ads during the primary accused Feingold of putting "his liberal ideology before our safety", while another primary spot featured footage of the September 11 Attacks and a voice-over saying that "our leaders passed new laws to keep us safe. But Russ Feingold voted against those laws." After easily winning the Republican primary against three opponents, Michel released two more anti-Feingold spots focusing on the Patriot Act. One of the ads showed further footage of the September 11 attacks, while another depicted a Middle Eastern spy photographing a Wisconsin nuclear power plant before Michels appears on-screen and announces that "Unlike Russ Feingold, I will support renewing the PATRIOT Act, because we need to be able to track and stop terrorists before they strike again." Michels reported that one-fifth of his campaign's advertising budget was devoted to making and airing the spots.

In October, based on a belief that Feingold was vulnerable due in part to his vote on the Patriot Act, the NRSC pledged $600,000 in support of the Michel campaign. However, after the Michel commercials generated negative attention and Feingold continued to lead comfortably in most polls, the party rescinded their financial assistance. On October 1, a poll showed Feingold leading 52% to 39%. In mid October, another poll showed Feingold winning 48% to 43%. A poll at the end of the month showed him leading 51% to 36%.

=== Predictions ===
Source	Ranking	As of
Sabato's Crystal Ball	Safe D	November 1, 2004

=== Polling ===
Poll source	Date(s) administered	Sample size	Margin of error	Russ Feingold (D)	Tim Michels (R)	Arif Khan (L)	Undecided
Zogby International	October 27–30, 2004	601 (LV)	± 4.1%	57%	37%		6%
Tarrance Group (R)	October 29, 2004	500 (LV)	± 4.5%	48%	43%		9%
Zogby International	October 26–29, 2004	600 (LV)	± 4.1%	57%	37%		6%
Tarrance Group (R)	October 28, 2004	500 (LV)	± 4.5%	49%	41%		10%
Zogby International	October 25–28, 2004	601 (LV)	± 4.1%	57%	37%		6%
Tarrance Group (R)	October 27, 2004	500 (LV)	± 4.5%	51%	41%		8%
Zogby International	October 24–27, 2004	601 (LV)	± 4.1%	59%	36%		5%
University of Wisconsin	October 23–27, 2004	545 (V)	± 4%	51%	36%		13%
Tarrance Group (R)	October 26, 2004	500 (LV)	± 4.5%	52%	39%		9%
Zogby International	October 23–26, 2004	601 (LV)	± 4.1%	57%	38%		5%
Tarrance Group (R)	October 25, 2004	500 (LV)	± 4.5%	52%	40%		8%
Zogby International	October 22–25, 2004	601 (LV)	± 4.1%	54%	41%		5%
Zogby International	October 21–24, 2004	601 (LV)	± 4.1%	54%	42%		4%
Rasmussen Reports	October 14, 2004	500 (LV)	± 4.5%	53%	43%	2%	2%
St. Norbert College	October 4–13, 2004	401 (LV)	± 5%	56%	33%		11%
Chicago Tribune/WGN-TV	October 2004			57%	33%		10%
Harris Interactive	September 22–26, 2004	562 (V)	± 4%	52%	39%		9%
University of Wisconsin	September 15–21, 2004	485 (LV)	± 4.5%	53%	38%		9%
ABC News	September 16–19, 2004	775 (LV)	± 3.5%	51%	45%		4%
University of Wisconsin	June 15–23, 2004	504 (V)	± 4%	36%	12%		52%

Hypothetical polling

Poll source	Date(s) administered	Sample size	Margin of error	Russ Feingold (D)	Russ Darrow (R)	Undecided
University of Wisconsin	June 15–23, 2004	504 (V)	± 4%	40%	16%	44%

Poll source	Date(s) administered	Sample size	Margin of error	Russ Feingold (D)	Robert Welch (R)	Undecided
University of Wisconsin	June 15–23, 2004	504 (V)	± 4%	36%	10%	54%

Poll source	Date(s) administered	Sample size	Margin of error	Russ Feingold (D)	Robert Gerald Lorge (R)	Undecided
University of Wisconsin	June 15–23, 2004	504 (V)	± 4%	39%	10%	51%

=== Results ===
General election results
Party	Candidate	Votes	%
Democratic	Russ Feingold (incumbent)	1,632,697	55.35%
Republican	Tim Michels	1,301,183	44.11%
Libertarian	Arif Khan	8,367	0.28%
Independent	Eugene A. Hem	6,662	0.23%
Write-in		834	0.03%
Total votes		2,949,743	100.00%
Democratic hold			

==== Counties that flipped Republican to Democratic ====
- Barron (largest city: Rice Lake)
- Brown (largest city: Green Bay)
- Burnett (largest village: Grantsburg)
- Clark (largest city: Neillsville)
- Kewaunee (largest city: Algoma)
- Langlade (largest city: Antigo)
- Manitowoc (largest city: Manitowoc)
- Marathon (largest city: Wausau)
- Monroe (largest city: Sparta)
- Oneida (largest city: Rhinelander)
- Outagamie (largest city: Appleton)
- Rusk (largest city: Ladysmith)
- Washburn (largest city: Spooner)
- Lafayette (largest city: Darlington)
- Pepin (largest city: Durand)
- Racine (largest city: Racine)
- Richland (largest city: Richland Center)
- Sawyer (largest city: Hayward)
- Winnebago (largest city: Oshkosh)
- Polk (Largest city: Amery)
- St. Croix (Largest city: Hudson)
- Taylor (Largest city: Medford)
- Door (largest city: Sturgeon Bay)
- Grant (largest city: Platteville)
- Juneau (largest city: Mauston)
- Wood (largest city: Marshfield)
- Chippewa (largest city: Chippewa Falls)

==== Counties that flipped from Democratic to Republican ====
- Florence (Largest city: Florence)

== See also ==
- 2004 United States Senate elections
