= 1992 United States Senate election in Wisconsin =

- November 3, 1992
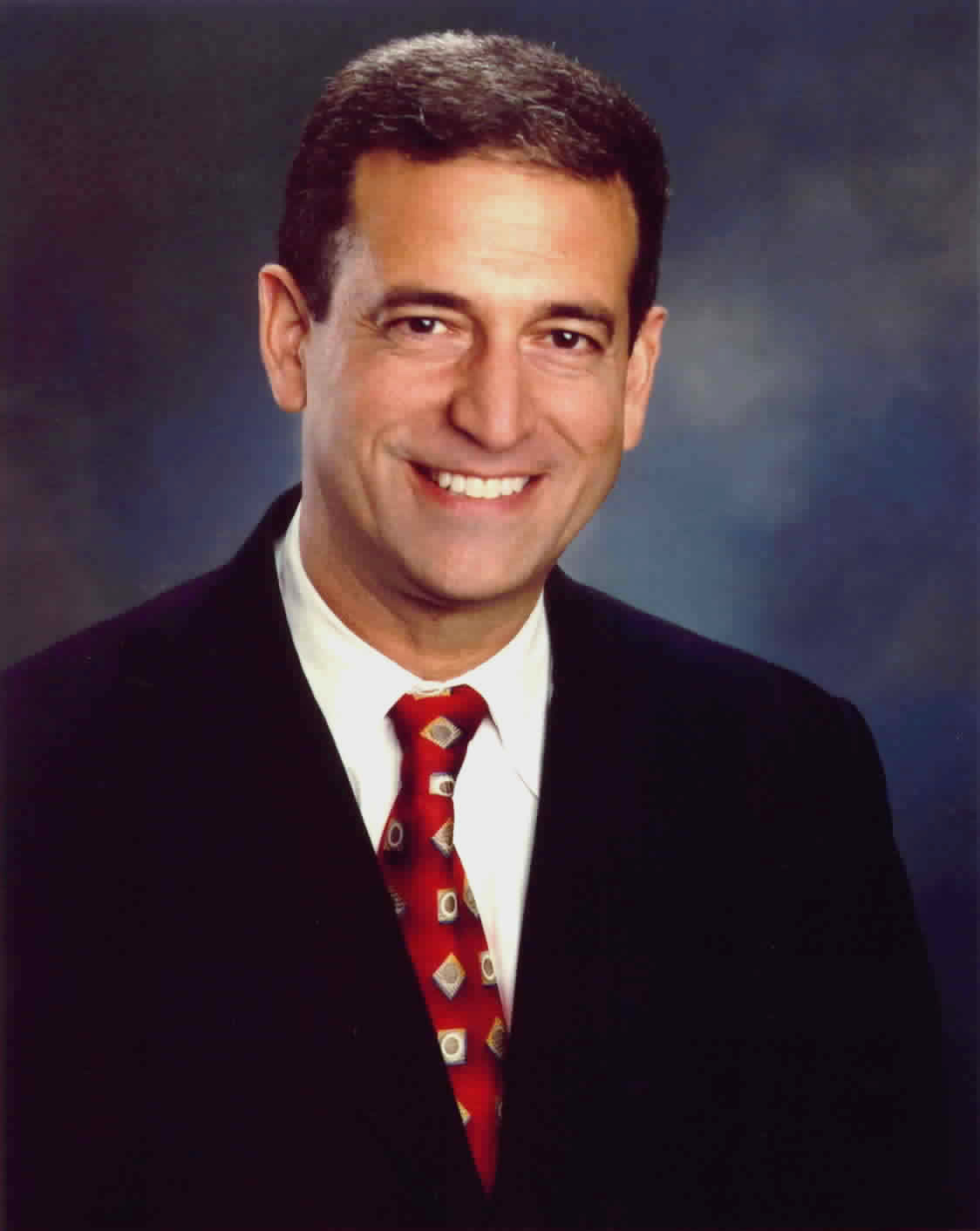

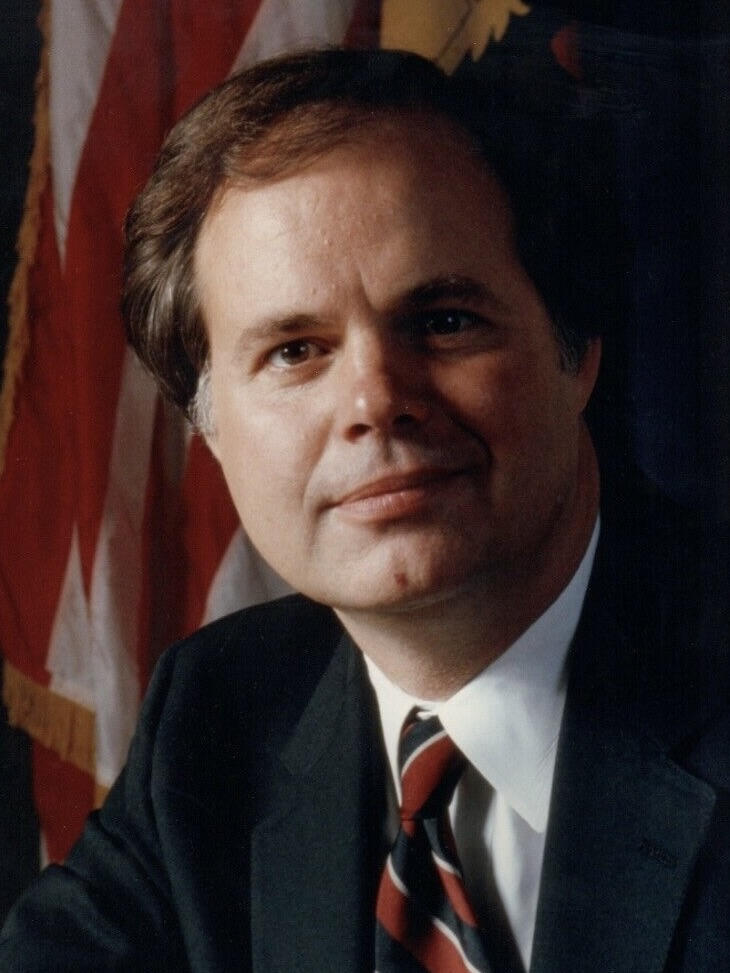
Nominee	Russ Feingold	Bob Kasten
Party	Democratic	Republican
Popular vote	1,290,662	1,129,599
Percentage	52.58%	46.02%
- Feingold: 40–50% 50–60% 60–70% 70–80% 80–90% >90% Kasten: 40–50% 50–60% 60–70% 70–80% 80–90% >90% Tie
U.S. senator before election
Bob Kasten
Republican
Elected U.S. Senator
Russ Feingold
Democratic

The 1992 United States Senate election in Wisconsin was held on November 3, 1992. Incumbent Republican U.S. Senator Bob Kasten ran for re-election to a third term but was defeated by Democrat Russ Feingold.

== Republican primary ==
=== Candidates ===
- Roger W. Faulkner
- Bob Kasten, incumbent U.S. Senator

=== Results ===
Republican primary results
Party	Candidate	Votes	%
Republican	Bob Kasten (incumbent)	197,488	80.49%
Republican	Roger W. Faulkner	47,804	19.48%
Republican	Write ins	79	0.03%
Total votes		245,371	100.00%

== Democratic primary ==
=== Candidates ===
- Joseph Checota, businessman
- Russ Feingold, State Senator
- Edmond C. Hou-Seye, perennial candidate
- Thomas Keller
- Jim Moody, U.S. Representative

=== Campaign ===
Feingold, who had little name recognition in the state and was campaigning in a primary against a pair of millionaire opponents, U.S. Congressman Jim Moody and Milwaukee businessman Joe Checota, adopted several proposals to gain the electorate's attention. The most memorable of these was a series of five promises written on Feingold's garage door in the form of a contract. Also noted was Feingold's advertising campaign, which was widely compared to that used by progressive candidate Paul Wellstone in his victorious Senate campaign in Minnesota. Shot in the form of home movies, the ads attempted to portray Feingold, who always referred to himself as "the underdog running for U.S. senate," as a down-to-earth, Capra-esque figure, taking the audience on a guided tour of the candidate's home and introducing them to his children, all of whom were enrolled in public school.

The ads also contained a significant amount of humor. One featured Feingold meeting with an Elvis Presley impersonator, who offered Feingold his endorsement. (Bob Kasten responded to the Elvis endorsement with an advertisement featuring an Elvis impersonator attacking Feingold's record.) Another showed Feingold standing next to a pair of half-sized cardboard cut-outs of his opponents, refusing to "stoop to their level" as the two were shown literally slinging mud at one another.

During the primary campaign, Feingold unveiled an 82-point plan that aimed to eliminate the deficit by the end of his first term. The plan, which called for, among other things, a raise in taxes and cuts in the defense budget, was derided as "extremist" by Republicans and "too liberal" by his Democratic opponents. Feingold also announced his support for strict campaign finance reform and a national health care system and voiced his opposition to term limits and new tax cuts.

Feingold won by positioning himself as a quirky underdog who offered voters an alternative to what was seen by many as negative campaigning of opponents Jim Moody and Joe Checota. On primary day, Feingold, whose support had shown in the single digits throughout much of the campaign, surged to victory with 70 percent of the vote.

=== Results ===
Democratic primary results
Party	Candidate	Votes	%
Democratic	Russ Feingold	367,746	69.67%
Democratic	Jim Moody	74,472	14.11%
Democratic	Joe Checota	71,570	13.56%
Democratic	Thomas Keller	8,678	1.64%
Democratic	Edmond C. Hou-Seye	5,019	0.95%
Democratic	Write-ins	359	0.07%
Total votes		527,844	100.00%

== General election ==
=== Results ===
While Bill Clinton, George H. W. Bush, and Ross Perot split the Wisconsin presidential vote 41% to 37% to 21%, Feingold beat Kasten by a margin of 53% to 46%.

General election results
Party	Candidate	Votes	%
Democratic	Russ Feingold	1,290,662	52.58%
Republican	Bob Kasten (incumbent)	1,129,599	46.02%
Independent	Patrick Johnson	16,513	0.67%
Libertarian	William Bittner	9,147	0.37%
Independent	Mervin A. Hanson, Sr.	3,264	0.13%
Grassroots	Robert L. Kundert	2,747	0.11%
Independent Populist	Joseph Selliken	2,733	0.11%
Total votes		2,454,665	100.00%
Democratic gain from Republican			

== See also ==
- 1992 United States Senate elections
