= John Stevens =

John Stevens may refer to:

== Architecture and engineering ==
- John Stevens (inventor, born 1749) (1749–1838), American engineer who developed the multitubular boiler engine and the screw propeller
- John Stevens (architect) (1824–1881), American architect
- John Calvin Stevens (1855–1940), American architect
- John Frank Stevens (1853–1943), builder of the Great Northern Railway in the U.S., chief engineer on the Panama Canal
- John H. Stevens (1820–1900), built the first house west of the Mississippi in what is now Minneapolis, Minnesota
- John Howard Stevens (1879–1958), American architect

== Business ==
- John Austin Stevens (banker) (1795–1874), American
- John J. Stevens (1852–1928), American businessman
- John Peters Stevens (1868–1929), CEO of the J.P. Stevens Textile Corporation

== Entertainment ==
- John A. Stevens (1844–1916), American playwright and actor
- John Stevens (drummer) (1940–1994), English drummer and founding member of the Spontaneous Music Ensemble
- John D. Stevens (born 1951), American composer and tuba player
- John Stevens (singer) (born 1987), American Idol contestant
- Steve Brodie (actor) (1919–1992), American actor, born John Stevens, or John Stevenson
- Johnny Stevens (singer), singer from rock band Highly Suspect
- John "Rambo" Stevens (1957–2023), English record producer and manager

== Law ==
- John Sanborn Stevens (1838–1912), Illinois lawyer
- John Paul Stevens (1920–2019), U.S. Supreme Court Associate Justice
- John Stevens, Baron Stevens of Kirkwhelpington (born 1942), former Commissioner of the Metropolitan Police
- J. Morgan Stevens (1876–1951), justice of the Supreme Court of Mississippi

== Military ==
- John Harvey Stevens (1790–1866), Royal Marines officer
- John Stevens (Royal Navy officer) (1900–1989), British admiral
- John Stevens (admiral) (born 1927), Australian Deputy Chief of Naval Staff (1979–1981)

== Politics ==
- John Stephenson (MP for Hythe) (fl.1571), or Stevens
- John Stevens (New Jersey politician) (c. 1716–1792), delegate to the Continental Congress
- John Stevens (British politician) (born 1955), founder of the Pro-Euro Conservative Party
- John Stevens (Tennessee politician) (born 1973), Tennessee State Senator
- John Stevens (New Hampshire politician) (1783–1848), New Hampshire politician
- John Stevens (New Zealand politician) (1845–1916), politician
- J. Christopher Stevens (1960–2012), American diplomat, U.S. ambassador to Libya
- John L. Stevens (1820–1895), U.S. ambassador to the Kingdom of Hawai'i
- John Shorter Stevens (1933–2019), American lawyer and politician
- John Valentine Stevens (1852–1925), British trade unionist and politician

== Sports ==
=== Cricket ===
- John Stevens (cricketer, born 1769) (1769–1863), English cricketer, mostly played for Essex
- John Stevens (cricketer, born 1854) (1854–?), English cricketer
- John Stevens (cricketer, born 1875) (1875–1923), English cricketer
- John Stevens (New Zealand cricketer) (1828-1873), New Zealand cricketer
- John Stevens (Victoria cricketer) (1811–1891), Indian-born Australian cricketer
- John Stevens (New South Wales cricketer) (born 1948), Australian cricketer

=== Other sports ===
- John Stevens (footballer) (born 1971), Australian rules footballer
- John Stevens (ice hockey) (born 1966), Canadian ice hockey player and coach
- John Cox Stevens (1785–1857), American yachtsman
- John Stevens (baseball umpire) (1912–1981), American baseball umpire

== Other people ==
- John Stevens (translator) (died 1726), Hispanist and translator
- John Austin Stevens (1827–1910), founder of the Sons of the Revolution
- John Stevens (Wisconsin inventor) (1840–1920), of the flour roller mill
- John Robert Stevens (1919–1983), American Christian preacher
- John Stevens (musicologist) (1921–2002), English musicologist, literary scholar and historian
- John Stevens (crime reporter) (1929–2016), for the London Evening Standard
- John Stevens (scholar) (1947–2025), Aikido teacher, Buddhist priest and author

== See also ==
- Jon Stevens (born 1961), New Zealand singer
- John S. Stevens (disambiguation), several people
- John Stephens (disambiguation)
- Jack Stevens (disambiguation)
