= John S. Stevens =

John S. Stevens may refer to

- John Sanborn Stevens (1838–1912), American lawyer from Illinois
- John Shorter Stevens (1933–2019), American lawyer from North Carolina
- R. J. S. Stevens (born Richard John Samuel Stevens; 1757–1837), English composer and organist

== See also ==
- John Stevens (disambiguation)
- Jack Stevens (disambiguation)
