= J.P. Stevens =

J.P. Stevens may refer to:

- J.P. Stevens Textile Corporation, a constituent corporation of WestPoint Home
- J.P. Stevens High School, named after the founder of the above
- John Paul Stevens (1920-2019) American Associate Justice of the Supreme Court of the United States
- John Peters Stevens, American textile industrialist
