= Jack Stephens =

Jack Stephens may refer to:

- Jack Stephens (American football) (born 1939), American former football coach
- Jack Stephens (basketball) (1933–2011), American basketball player
- Jack Stephens (cricketer) (1913–1967), Australian cricketer
- Jack Stephens (footballer) (born 1994), English footballer
- Jack Stephens (set decorator) (active 1949–1986), Bangladeshi set decorator
- Jackson T. Stephens (1923–2005), American businessman
- Jack Stephens (The Inbetweeners), minor character in British sitcom Inbetweeners
- Jack Stephens (born 1988), English musician, member of Munroe Effect

== See also ==
- Jack Stevens (disambiguation)
- John Stephens (disambiguation)
- Jackson Stephens (disambiguation)
