= Jack Stevens =

Jack Stevens may refer to:

- Jack Stevens (officer) (1896–1969), Australian Army senior officer
- Jack Stevens (cinematographer) (1903–1961), American cinematographer
- Jack Stevens (Australian footballer) (1929–2013), Australian rules footballer for Geelong and South Melbourne
- Jack Stevens (footballer, born 1909) (1909 – after 1943), English association footballer for Stockport County and Brighton & Hove Albion
- Jack Stevens (footballer, born 1997), English association football goalkeeper
- Jack Stevens (footballer, born 2000), English footballer (Solihill Moors, Oldham Athletic) see 2025–26 Oldham Athletic A.F.C. season
- Jack Stevens (rugby league), English rugby league player
- John Shorter Stevens (1933–2019), American lawyer and politician in North Carolina

== See also ==
- Jack Steven (born 1990), Australian rules footballer for St Kilda
- Jack Stephens (disambiguation)
- John Stevens (disambiguation)
