= Peress =

Peress is a surname. Notable people with the surname include:

- Gilles Peress (born 1946), French photojournalist
- Irving Peress, (1917–2014), American target of Senator Joseph McCarthy
- Joseph Salim Peress (1896–1978), British diving engineer
- Maurice Peress (born 1930), American conductor
- Paul Peress, American jazz drummer
