= Ralph Wise Zwicker =

United States Army general (1903–1991)

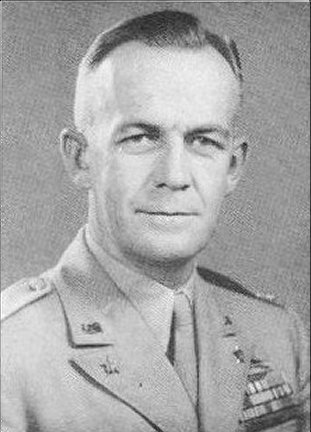
- Major General Ralph Wise Zwicker, pictured here in the 1950s
- Born: April 17, 1903; Stoughton, Wisconsin, United States
- Died: August 9, 1991 (aged 88); Fairfax, Virginia, United States
- Burial place: Arlington National Cemetery
- Military career
- Allegiance: United States
- Branch: United States Army
- Service years: 1927–1960
- Rank: Major General
- Commands: 38th Infantry Regiment; 18th Infantry Regiment; 24th Infantry Division; 1st Cavalry Division; XX Corps
- Conflicts: World War II: Normandy landings; Rhineland Campaign; Battle of the Bulge; Central Europe
- Awards: Army Distinguished Service Medal; Silver Star; Legion of Merit (2); Bronze Star Medal (3); Army Commendation Medal

Major General Ralph Wise Zwicker, USA, (April 17, 1903 – August 9, 1991) was a highly decorated American Army officer who came to public attention during Senator Joseph McCarthy's investigation in 1954.

== Biography ==
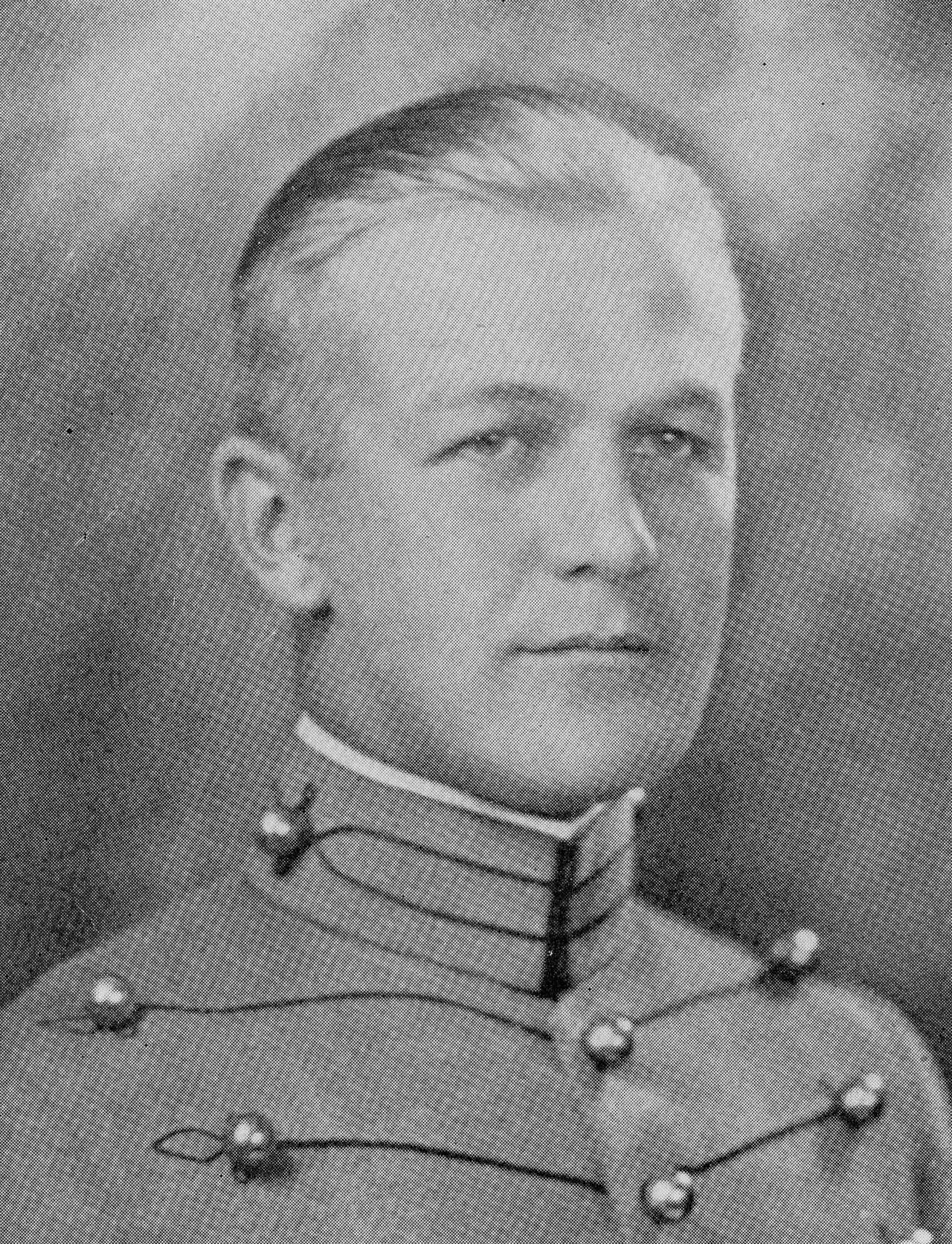
At West Point in 1927

Zwicker was born on April 17, 1903, in Stoughton, Wisconsin. He was the first Eagle Scout in the state and graduated from high school in Madison, Wisconsin. After high school he attended the University of Wisconsin-Madison before being recommended for the United States Military Academy at West Point. He graduated in 1927. His brother, Michael, also served in the Army as a colonel. He married Dorothy Harriet Stewart on July 14, 1927, exactly one month after graduating West Point, and had three children. Zwicker died on August 9, 1991, at Fort Belvoir. He is buried with his wife Dorothy (1904–1985) and beside his brother Michael at Arlington National Cemetery, in Section 2.

== Career ==
Zwicker graduated from the United States Military Academy in 1927 and was assigned to Fort Snelling. In 1934, he became an instructor at the United States Military Academy. Later he was assigned to Fort Douglas, Camp Bullis, and Fort Sam Houston. In 1941, he became an instructor at the United States Army Infantry School.

During World War II, Lt. Colonel Zwicker participated in the Normandy landings on D-Day with the 29th Infantry Division. He went ashore in a pre-first wave with roughly 100 soldiers as Forward Observer / Beachmaster in the Easy Red Sector of Omaha Beach, sending back intelligence on enemy troop movements, placement of enemy artillery et cetera to the Commanding General Headquarters V Corp. For his actions on D-Day he was awarded the Bronze Star with arrowhead, Silver Star, Distinguished Service Order from Great Britain and was promoted to full colonel soon thereafter.

Due to fortunate circumstances, Colonel Zwicker took command of the 38th Infantry Regiment on July 5, 1944. Less than one week later on July 11, 1944, Major General Walter M. Robertson commander of the 2nd Infantry Division gave the order to take Hill 192. Hill 192 was a major German defensive stronghold that was covered with ancient hedgerows and thick old-growth tree clusters. Taking Hill 192 took the full force and might of the 2nd Infantry Division along with 9 battalions of artillery using a tactic called "Moving Barrage". During the day, roughly 25,000 rounds of artillery, consisting of 50% H.E. and 50% W.P, were levied on the hill before it was taken. This was the only time in the European Theatre that a moving barrage was used. Now the gateway was open for the battle of St. Lo and the beginning of what was to be known as "the breakout." For his actions on hill 192 Colonel Zwicker was awarded his second Bronze Star.

During the Battle for Brest, elements of the 38th Infantry Regiment were the first Americans to enter the city. The port of Brest was captured after 39 days of combat on September 19, 1944. Sometime during the battle of Brest, Colonel Zwicker was awarded his third Bronze Star.

On October 11, 1944, Colonel Zwicker was transferred to Headquarters 2nd Inf Division and promoted to the position of chief of staff (G-3) of the 2nd Infantry Division until the end of the war. Out of the 25 Legion of Merits awarded by the 2nd Infantry Division during the war, Colonel Zwicker was awarded two.

Later, he attended the Naval War College and the National War College. In 1952, he became an instructor at the National War College after serving as the commander of the 18th Infantry Regiment Honor Guard in Germany. In March 1953, he was promoted to brigadier general and became commander of Camp Kilmer, New Jersey. He then was sent to Japan in 1954 and was made commander of the Southwestern Command AFFE until it was deactivated in 1956. He was then promoted to major general in May 1956 and took over command of the 24th Infantry Division in Korea. During his command, the 24th Division was deactivated and was replaced with the 1st Cavalry Division which he commanded until late 1958. Returning to the United States, he was made commander of the XX Corps Fort Hayes, Ohio, until he retired in 1960.

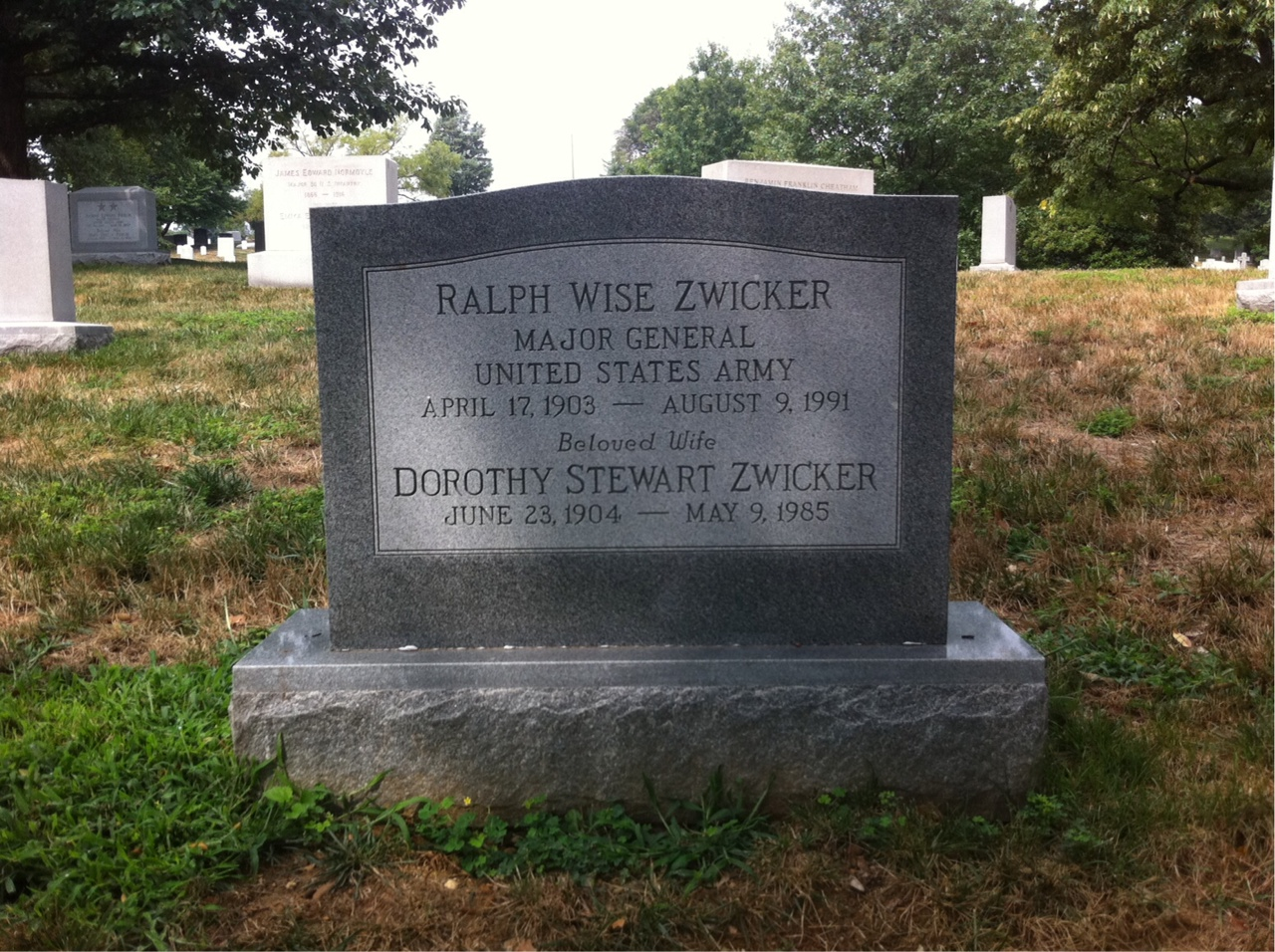
Grave at Arlington National Cemetery

When General of the Army Omar Bradley died in April 1981, Ralph W. Zwicker was named one of the honorary pallbearers at his funeral at Arlington National Cemetery.

Among the awards he received were, Army Distinguished Service Medal, Silver Star, 2 Legion of Merit, 3 Bronze Star Medal with 2 oak leaf clusters, Purple Heart, Army Commendation Medal as well as the Distinguished Service Order from the United Kingdom, Croix de Guerre with 3 palms from France, The French Legion of Honor, and was also awarded medals from Czechoslovakia and USSR.

=== Involvement with the McCarthy investigation, 1954 ===
While Zwicker was in command at Camp Kilmer, New Jersey, one of his subordinate officers, Major Irving Peress, had been ordered to be discharged from the Army because of his failure to answer questions on a loyalty review form. Having learned of this, the Senate investigating subcommittee of Joseph McCarthy subpoenaed Peress to testify on January 30, 1954. Peress refused to answer questions, citing Fifth Amendment protection against self-incrimination. McCarthy thereupon wrote to Secretary of the Army Robert T. Stevens to demand Peress's court martial. Peress, on the same day, requested that his pending discharge be acted upon immediately, and Zwicker, his commanding officer, granted him an honorable discharge.

McCarthy then called Zwicker to appear before the subcommittee on February 18, where on advice from Army counsel he refused to answer some of McCarthy's questions. Zwicker's testimony, as to whether he had known of Peress' refusal to testify before the same committee at the time that Zwicker granted his discharge, was apparently inconsistent. McCarthy retorted that Zwicker's intelligence was that of a "five-year-old child", and that he was "not fit to wear that uniform".

Army Secretary Stevens ordered Zwicker not to return to McCarthy's hearing. This abuse of Zwicker, a distinguished officer and highly decorated battlefield hero of World War II, provoked anger against McCarthy from many quarters, including the Army and President Eisenhower, who shortly thereafter initiated the Army–McCarthy hearings that led to McCarthy's downfall and censure.

In considering the censure resolution, a select committee chaired by Senator Arthur Vivian Watkins evaluated 46 charges in a "bill of particulars", ultimately reducing them to two, the second being his abuse of General Zwicker as a witness. The Zwicker count was subsequently dropped by the full Senate, and replaced by one in response to McCarthy's abuse of the Watkins committee itself.

== Medals and decorations ==
Here is the ribbon bar of Major General Ralph W. Zwicker:

Combat Infantryman Badge
1st Row	Army Distinguished Service Medal	Silver Star	Legion of Merit with Oak Leaf Cluster	Bronze Star with two Oak Leaf Clusters
2nd Row	Army Commendation Medal	American Defense Service Medal	American Campaign Medal	European-African-Middle Eastern Campaign Medal with four service stars and Arrowhead device
3rd Row	World War II Victory Medal	Army of Occupation Medal	National Defense Service Medal	Distinguished Service Order (United Kingdom)
4th Row	Legion of Honour, Chevalier (France)	Croix de guerre 1939–1945 with Palm (France)	Czechoslovak War Cross 1939–1945	Order of the Patriotic War Second Class (Union of Soviet Socialist Republics)
Army Staff Identification Badge
