= Stephen John =

Stephen John can refer to:

- Stephen John (cricketer) (born 1974), Pakistani cricketer
- Stephen John (footballer) (born 1966), English footballer
- John Stevenson (writer) (born 1930), British writer who wrote under the name Stephen John

== See also ==
- Stephen Johns (disambiguation)
