= John Stephen (disambiguation) =

John Stephen (1934–2004) was a Scottish fashion designer nicknamed "The King Of Carnaby Street".

John Stephen may also refer to:

- John Stephen (New South Wales judge) (1771–1833), judge in the Colony of New South Wales
- John Stephen (Maryland judge) (1780–1844), Maryland Court of Appeals judge
- John Stephen (New Hampshire politician)

== See also ==
- John Stephens (disambiguation)
