= Stephen Johns =

Stephen Johns may refer to:

- Stephen Johns (curler) (born 1965), Australian curler
- Stephen Johns (ice hockey) (born 1992), American ice hockey defenceman
- Stephen Johns (music producer), Grammy Award winning classical music producer
- Steve Johns (drummer) (born 1960), American jazz drummer

== See also ==
- Stephen John (disambiguation)
- John Stephens (disambiguation)
