= Stevens Linen Works Historic District =

Historic district in Massachusetts, United States

- U.S. National Register of Historic Places
- U.S. Historic district
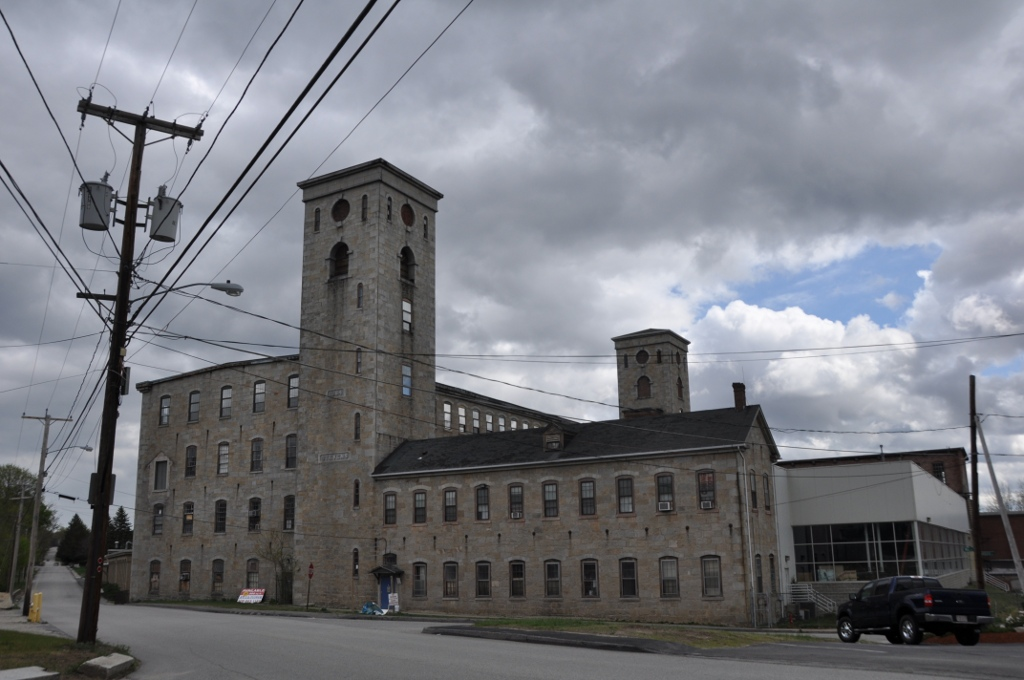

- Location within Massachusetts Location within the United States
- Location: 8–10 Mill St., 2 W. Main St., 2 Curfew Ln., Ardlock Pl., Dudley, Massachusetts
- Area: 24.32 acres (9.84 ha)
- Built: 1865
- NRHP reference No.: 10000751
- Added to NRHP: September 17, 2010

The Stevens Linen Works Historic District encompasses a 19th-century factory complex associated with the manufacturing of linen and flax fabric in Dudley, Massachusetts. Its centerpiece is the Stevens Linen Mill, built in the 1860s by Henry Hale Stevens and operated into the 1990s. The mill is a large granite U-shaped building, five stories high, with two seven-story towers at the corners of the U. The complex includes ten buildings in all, as well as a mill pond and dam.

The mill complex was listed on the National Register of Historic Places in 2010.

== See also ==
- National Register of Historic Places listings in Worcester County, Massachusetts
