= Robert T. Stevens =

American businessman (1899–1983)

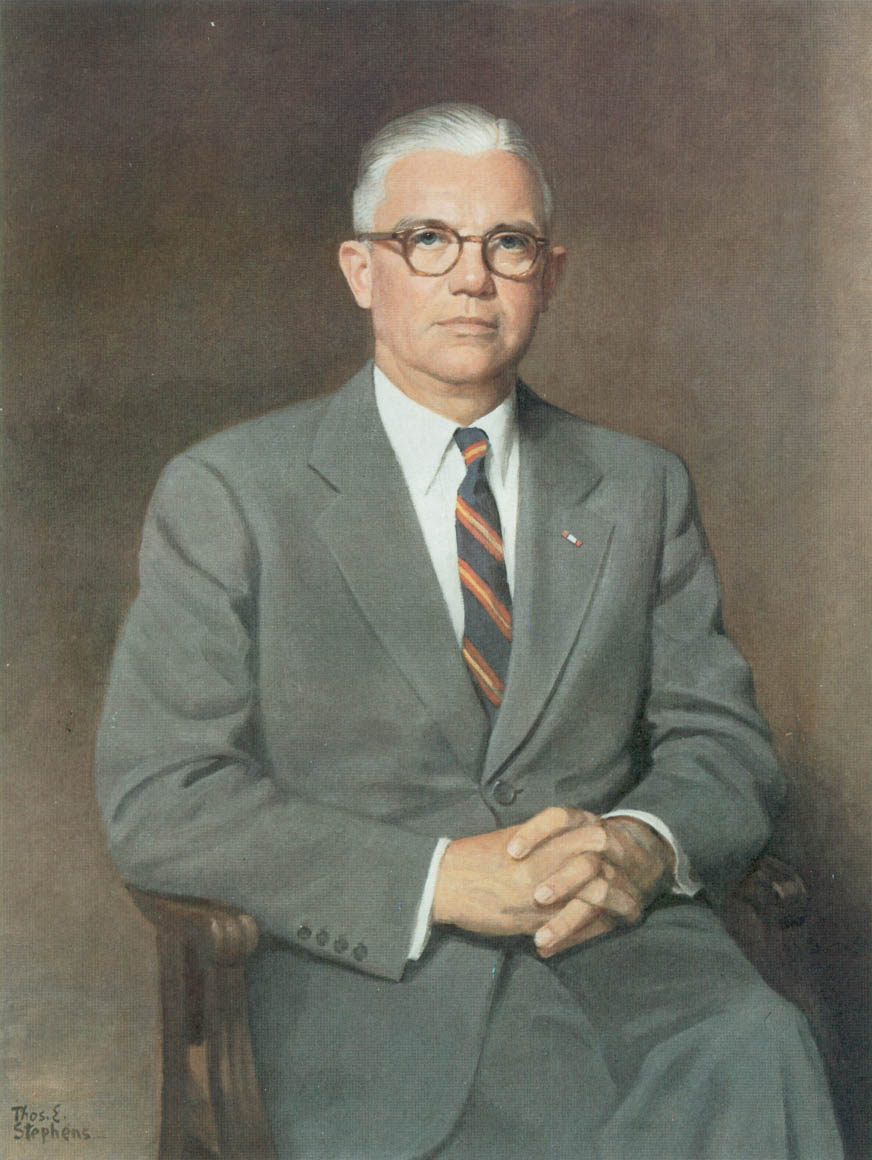
- Official portrait, c. 1955

4th United States Secretary of the Army
- In office February 4, 1953 – July 21, 1955
- President: Dwight D. Eisenhower
- Preceded by: Frank Pace
- Succeeded by: Wilber M. Brucker

Personal details
- Born: July 31, 1899 Fanwood, New Jersey, U.S.
- Died: January 31, 1983 (aged 83) Edison, New Jersey, U.S.
- Relatives: John Peters Stevens (father)
- Education: Yale University (BA)

Military service
- Allegiance: United States
- Branch/service: United States Army
- Years of service: 1917–1918, 1942–1945
- Rank: Colonel
- Battles/wars: World War I World War II

Robert Ten Broeck Stevens (July 31, 1899 – January 31, 1983) was an American businessman and former chairman of J. P. Stevens and Company, which was one of the most established textile manufacturing plants in the US. He served as the Secretary of the Army between February 4, 1953, until July 21, 1955.

== Biography ==
Stevens was born on July 31, 1899, in Fanwood, New Jersey to John Peters Stevens and Edna Ten Broeck. He attended Phillips Academy and graduated in 1917. After serving as a second lieutenant in the field artillery in World War I he attended and graduated from Yale University. He became president of J.P. Stevens and Company in 1929. It is now part of a conglomerate—WestPoint Home.

In 1941, Stevens attended a civilian course at the Army Command and General Staff School. In 1942, he was recalled to active duty in the Quartermaster Corps as a lieutenant colonel. Promoted to colonel, he served in the United States during most of World War II except for a temporary assignment in Europe, returning to civilian life in 1945.

He served as chairman of The Business Council, then known as the Business Advisory Council for the United States Department of Commerce in 1951 and 1952.

On January 29, 1953, Stevens was nominated to be Secretary of the Army by President Dwight Eisenhower and appeared for a hearing before the Senate Committee on Armed Services that same day. After confirmation, he came into conflict with Senator Joseph McCarthy over a series of issues that ultimately led to the Army-McCarthy hearings of 1954. In the fall of 1953, McCarthy began an investigation into the United States Army Signal Corps laboratory at Fort Monmouth. McCarthy's aggressive questioning of army personnel was damaging to morale, but failed to reveal any sign of the "dangerous spies" that McCarthy alleged to exist. Next McCarthy investigated the case of Irving Peress, an Army dentist who had refused to answer questions in a loyalty-review questionnaire.

As various officers, scientists and other army staff were subjected to McCarthy's often abusive questioning, Stevens was criticized for capitulating to many of McCarthy's demands and not supporting his men.

Concurrent with these events, McCarthy's chief counsel, Roy Cohn, had been pressuring the army, including Stevens, to give preferential treatment to his friend G. David Schine, who had recently been drafted. The Army-McCarthy hearings were held to investigate the Army's charge that McCarthy and Cohn were making improper demands on behalf of Schine, and McCarthy's counter charge that the Army was holding Schine "hostage" in an attempt to halt McCarthy's investigations into the Army. During the hearings, McCarthy questioned Stevens for several days. Although Stevens is generally considered to have handled the hearings poorly, it was McCarthy who fared worst in the month-long investigation. The exposure before a television audience of McCarthy's methods and manners during the hearings are credited with playing a major role in his ultimate downfall. Stevens wanted to resign after the incident but Vice-President Richard Nixon convinced him not to.

== J. P. Stevens & Company ==
Robert T. Stevens had a fifty-year career with J. P. Stevens & Company—named after New York-based John Peter Stevens who made his fortune by selling the products of his grandfather's Massachusetts-based family business which dated back to the War of 1812. Under John Peter Stevens it became one of the largest textile companies in the United States with mills in the North and South. By the age of thirty Robert T. Stevens was president of the company. During his tenure it was "one of the world's largest, most diversified textile organizations." He left Stevens for two-years to serve as Secretary of the Army and by July 1955 he returned to Stevens where he remained until his retirement. He became director emeritus in 1974.

Like many other companies in post-World War II United States, Stevens moved the company south specifically because he "wanted to pay lower wages and avoid unions."

By 1963 Stevens was the second-largest company in the United States with 36,000 employees—mainly in the Southern states. For that reason it was selected by the union as the target of a major organizing campaign. Stevens's employees earned "wages that were well below the manufacturing average, and they had few benefits." Stevens resented his company being singled out by the union, and made an aggressive stand. From 1963 to 1980 the company and the union entered into a bitter struggle that became known as the J. P. Stevens campaign or controversy.

== Personal life ==
His children include Bob Stevens from Helena, Montana, J. Whitney Stevens from New York, and Tom Stevens from Florida. The family still owns an est. 45,000-acre (180 km^{2}) cattle ranch called the American Fork in Two Dot, Montana.

Stevens died on January 30, 1983, in Edison, New Jersey. He was buried at the West Point Cemetery on February 3, 1983.

Government offices
Preceded by Frank Pace	United States Secretary of the Army; February 1953 – July 1955	Succeeded by Wilber M. Brucker
