= Jackson Stephens (disambiguation) =

Jackson Stephens may refer to:

- Jackson Stephens (born 1952), American businessman
- Jackson T. Stephens (1923-2005), American oilman and investment banker
- Jackson Stephens (baseball) (born 1994), American baseball player
- Jackson Stephens (soccer), American soccer player for the 2026 Athletic Club Boise season
- Jackson Stephens (footballer), Australian footballer for 2025 Australian Championship

== See also ==
- Jack Stephens, multiple people
