= Jack Stevens (footballer, born 1909) =

English footballer

Personal information
- Full name: John Stevens
- Date of birth: 1 February 1909
- Place of birth: Broomhill, England
- Date of death: 22 December 1994
- Height: 5 ft 10 in (1.78 m)
- Position: Centre half

Senior career*
Years	Team	Apps	(Gls)
1927–1929	Ashington	2	(0)
1929–1932	Manchester City	0	(0)
1932–1934	Stockport County	66	(0)
1934–1940	Brighton & Hove Albion	137	(0)
- * Club domestic league appearances and goals

John Stevens (1 February 1909 – after 1943) was an English professional footballer who made more than 200 Football League appearances playing as a centre half for Ashington, Stockport County and Brighton & Hove Albion.

== Life and career ==
Stevens was born in Broomhill, Northumberland. As a young man, he was a professional sprinter who won the Morpeth Handicap Sprint. He began his Football League career with Ashington, for whom he appeared twice, and was on the books of Manchester City without playing first-team football, before joining Stockport County in late 1932. He became a regular for Stockport over the next 18 months, was ever-present in the 1933–34 season, and appeared on the losing side in the inaugural Third Division North Cup Final. Stevens then signed for Brighton & Hove Albion. Appearing infrequently in his first season, he missed only five Third Division South matches in the next three, before losing his place to Peter Trainor in 1938–39. He remained with the club during the first season of wartime competition before joining the Manchester Police.
