= Congreve rocket =

Type of artillery missile

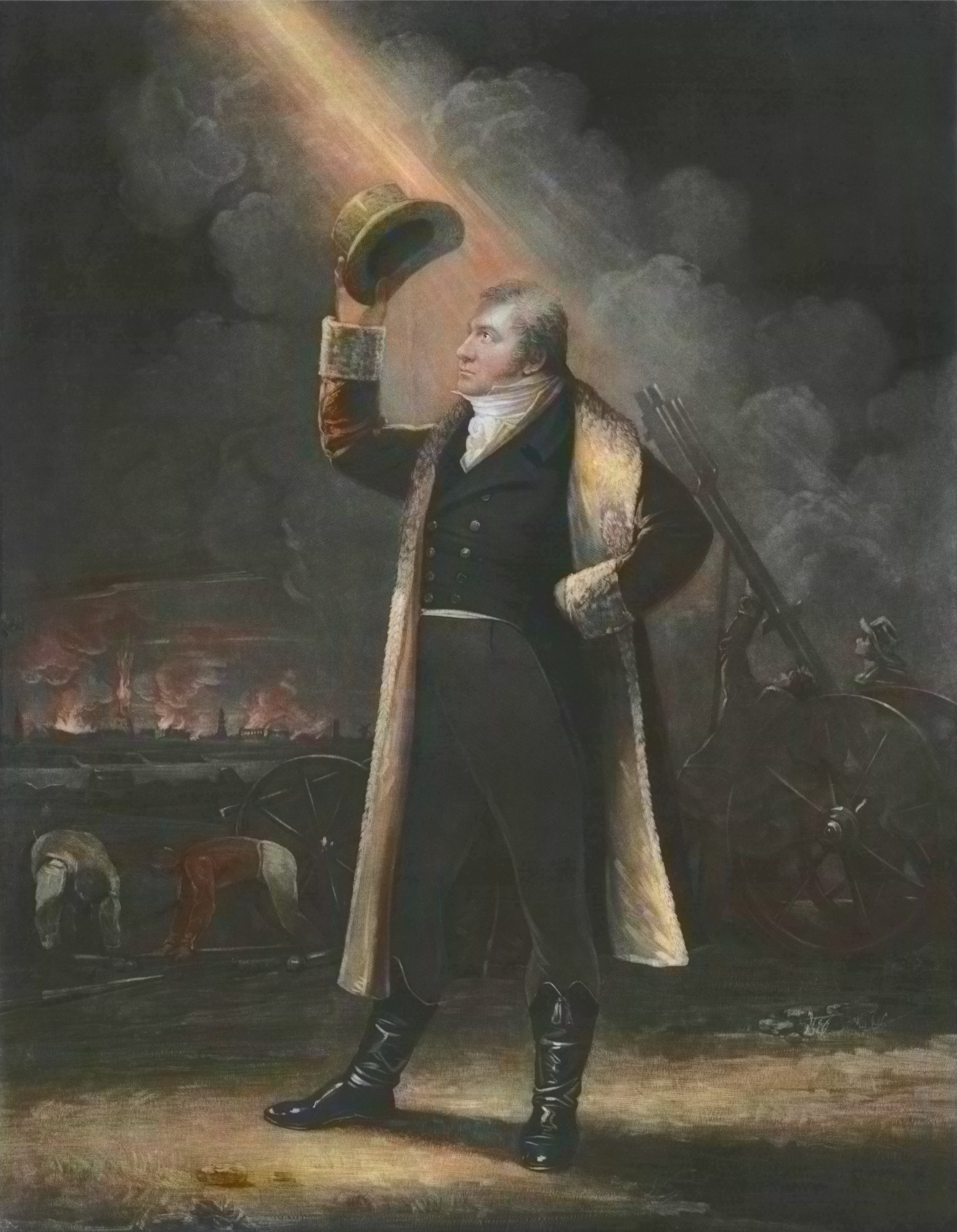
Portrait of William Congreve with a background scene of rocket fire during the British bombardment of Copenhagen, painted by James Lonsdale

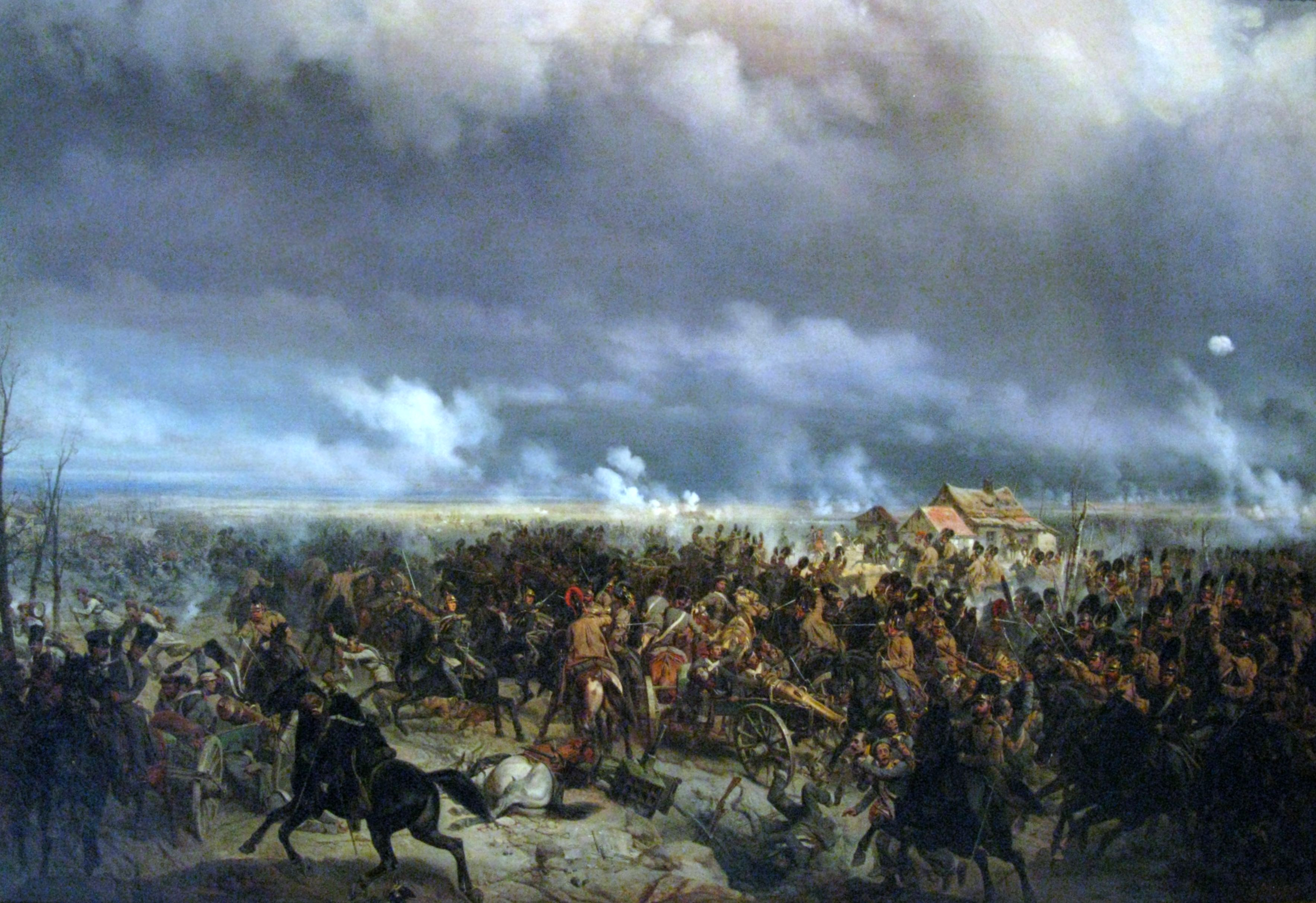
Battle of Grochów 1831, painting of Bogdan Willewalde c. 1850. Above the fighters, Polish Congreve rockets can be seen exploding.

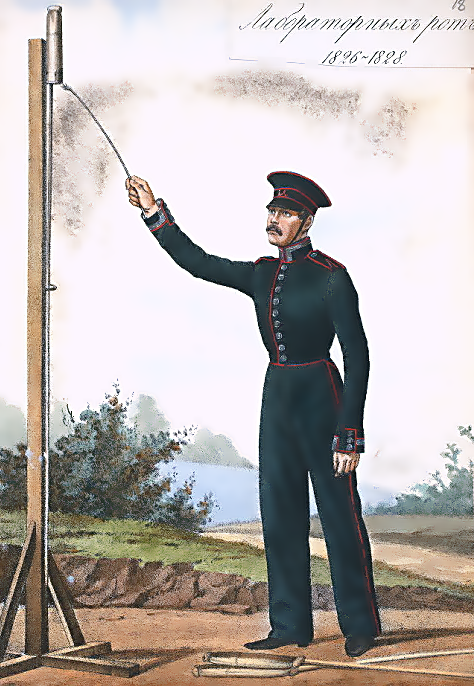
A Russian soldier depicted using the Congreve rocket

The Congreve rocket was a type of rocket artillery designed by British inventor Sir William Congreve in 1808. The design was based upon the rockets deployed by the Kingdom of Mysore against the East India Company during the 1790s, several of which were sent to Great Britain after 1799.

The project was continued chiefly with William Congreve, who set up a research and development programme at the Woolwich Arsenal's laboratory. After development work was complete the rockets were manufactured in quantity further north, near Waltham Abbey Royal Gunpowder Mills. The rockets were used by the British, the Russians, Austria, and Paraguay during the nineteenth century.

== Background ==
The king of Mysore, Tipu Sultan, employed up to 5000 artillerymen specialising in rocket artillery. The launch angle was calculated from the diameter of the cylinder and the distance of the target, and rockets were launched also from wheeled carts. Rockets could be of various sizes, but usually consisted of a cylindrical housing of soft hammered iron about 8 inches (200 mm) long, weighing between 6 and 12 pounds. A rocket carrying about one pound of powder could travel almost 1,000 yards (910 m). In contrast, rockets in Europe were not iron cased and could not take large chamber pressures, limiting their reach.

== William Congreve ==
Congreve, who knew of the Mysore rockets but later claimed not to have based his design on them, started developing rockets in 1804 by buying the best rockets on the London market, but found that their greatest range was only 600 yards. After spending several hundred pounds of his own money on experiments, he was able to make a rocket that would travel 1,500 yards. He then applied to Lord Chatham (the responsible minister in charge of the Ordnance Department) for permission to have some large rockets made at Woolwich. Permission was granted and several six-pounder rockets made on principles he had previously ascertained achieved a range of full two thousand yards. By the spring of 1806, he was producing 32-pounder rockets ranging 3,000 yards. Congreve enjoyed the friendship of the Prince Regent, who supported his rocket projects and in whose household he served as an equerry from 1811. The Prince Regent was also the Elector of Hanover, and he was awarded the honorary rank of lieutenant colonel in the Hanoverian army's artillery in 1811. In 1813, Congreve declined the offer to command the Rocket Corps with rank in the Regiment of Artillery.

Congreve registered two patents and published three books on rocketry.

== Design ==
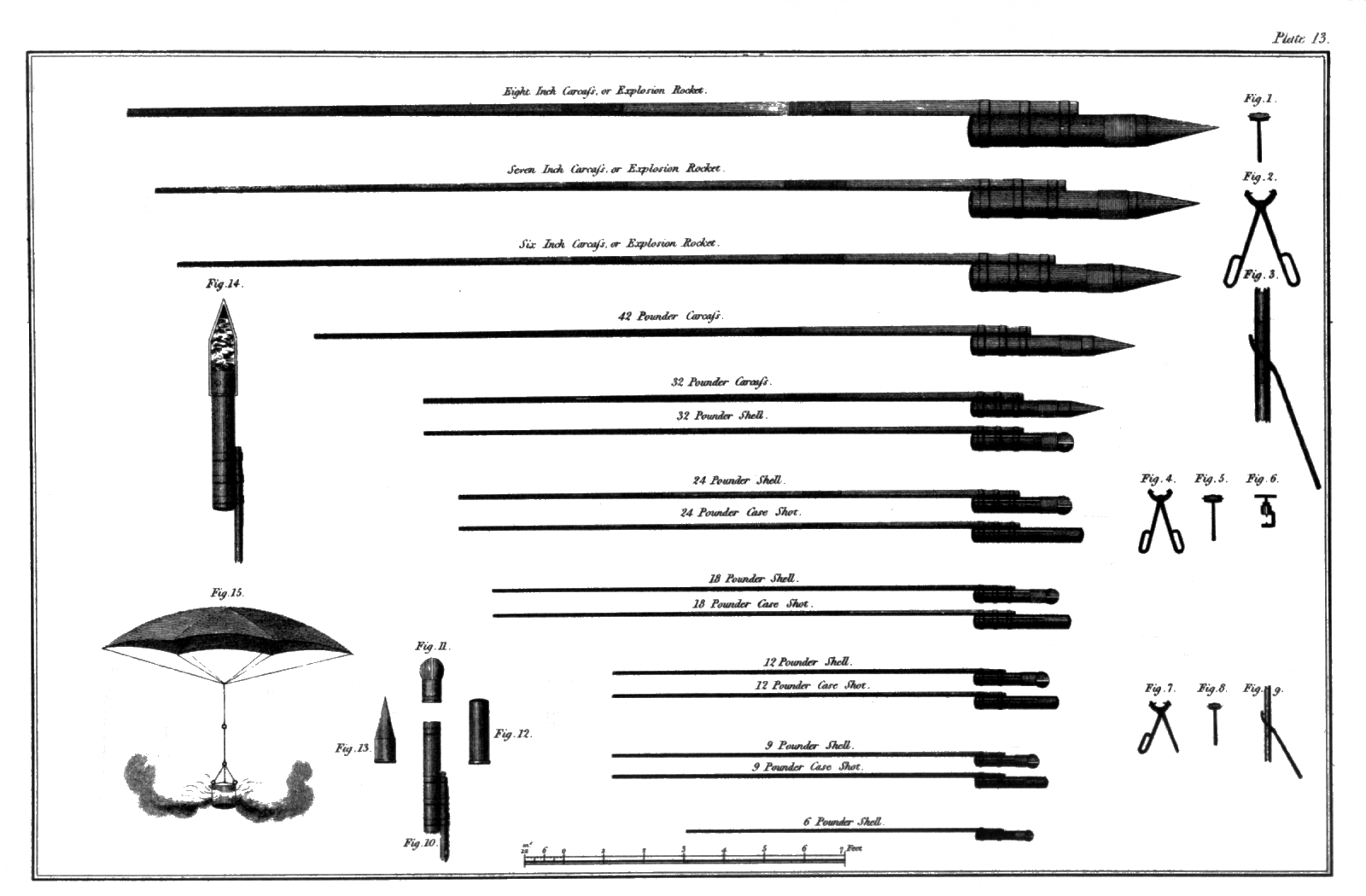
Congreve rockets from Congreve's original work

The initial rocket cases were constructed of cardboard, but by 1806 they were made from sheet iron. The propulsion was of the same ingredients as gunpowder, the mixture of which varied with the different sizes of rocket. The warheads had side-mounted brackets which were used to attach wooden sticks of differing lengths, according to the sizes of rocket.

The propulsion mechanism relied on controlled deflagration of black powder within the iron case, with high-pressure gases expelled through a constricted nozzle producing reactive thrust. Exhaust velocities were estimated at 200-300 metres per second, though actual muzzle velocities proved lower due to inefficiencies in the solid propellant grain and nozzle design. Inconsistent burn rates, arising from variations in powder composition and packing density, resulted in unpredictable acceleration profiles and contributed significantly to range variability.

The wooden stabilising stick, typically 15-20 feet in length, interacted with airflow to generate corrective aerodynamic torques that partially countered inherent instabilities such as corkscrewing, though this passive system could not eliminate erratic trajectories entirely. In an attempt to eliminate the cumbersome stick, Congreve patented a tail-mounted revolving fin design around 1823 intended to provide spin stabilisation, but trials demonstrated insufficient effectiveness and stick-guided variants remained predominant.

Rocket sizes were designated by the calibre of the tube, using the then-standard British method of using weight in pounds as a measure of cannon bore. Larger diameter rockets also had correspondingly longer tubes.

By 1813, the rockets were made available in three classes:

- Heavy – carcass/explosive rockets, 100- and 300-pounders; between five and six feet in length, with a stick length of 25–27 feet. Considered too cumbersome to use effectively in the field.
- Medium – 24- to 42-pounders; two to four feet in length, with a stick length of 15–20 feet
- Light – 6- to 18-pounders; 16–25 inches in length, with a stick length of 8–14 feet

The medium and light rockets could be case shot, shell, or explosive.

=== Warhead variants ===
Congreve rockets employed three primary warhead types: incendiary "carcasses" filled with combustible mixtures of saltpetre, sulphur and resin designed to ignite fires on impact; explosive warheads using black powder charges within spherical or ogival casings for fragmentation effects against fortifications; and shrapnel variants incorporating pre-formed fragments or balls for anti-personnel use.

Fuzes were wooden or composition types, separately ignited from the propellant and adjustable in length to delay detonation for airburst effects, enabling explosions at predetermined altitudes based on empirical timing of flight duration. These designs prioritised psychological impact and area denial over precision, with yields constrained by black powder's relatively low energy density compared to later high explosives.

The 32-pounder was generally used for longer range bombardment, while a 12–pounder case shot was generally used for support of infantry and cavalry, with an extreme range of some 2,000 yards. The rockets could be fired from a wheeled bombarding frame, from a portable tripod, or even from a shallow trench or sloping bank. One in three horse artillerymen carried a launching trough for ground firing.

In December 1815, Congreve demonstrated a new design of rocket that had the rocket stick screwing centrally into the base of the case. This remained in service from 1817 until 1867, when it was replaced by the Hale rocket which required no stick and used clockwise rotation to impart stability in flight.

In a ca. 1816 article (written before the 1816 Anglo-Dutch attack on Algiers), a description of the rockets is followed by mention of 1-ton rockets being taken aboard that fleet. It is suggested that "the impetus of their prodigious weight would force them indifferently through earth and mason-work."

Contrary to popular belief, rockets could not out-range the equivalent smooth bore guns of the period. In real terms, the maximum effective range for the 12-pounder rockets and for the six-pounder gun was some 1,400 yards or about 1,280 meters. However, the rate of fire with rockets could be higher than the equivalent muzzle loading ordnance. Trained rocketeers could fire four rounds in a minute. The absence of weighty ordnance meant that fewer horses were required. Captain Richard Bogue needed just 105 horses for his troop, compared with the 220 of Captain Cavalié Mercer's troop.

Rockets could be easily carried and readily deployed, particularly over difficult terrain or in small boats. This was amply demonstrated by the Royal Marine Artillery. The 12-pounder deployed at very close range was a fearsome weapon, as was seen at the battles of Göhrde and Leipzig in 1813, as well as the crossing of the Adour and the Battle of Toulouse in 1814.

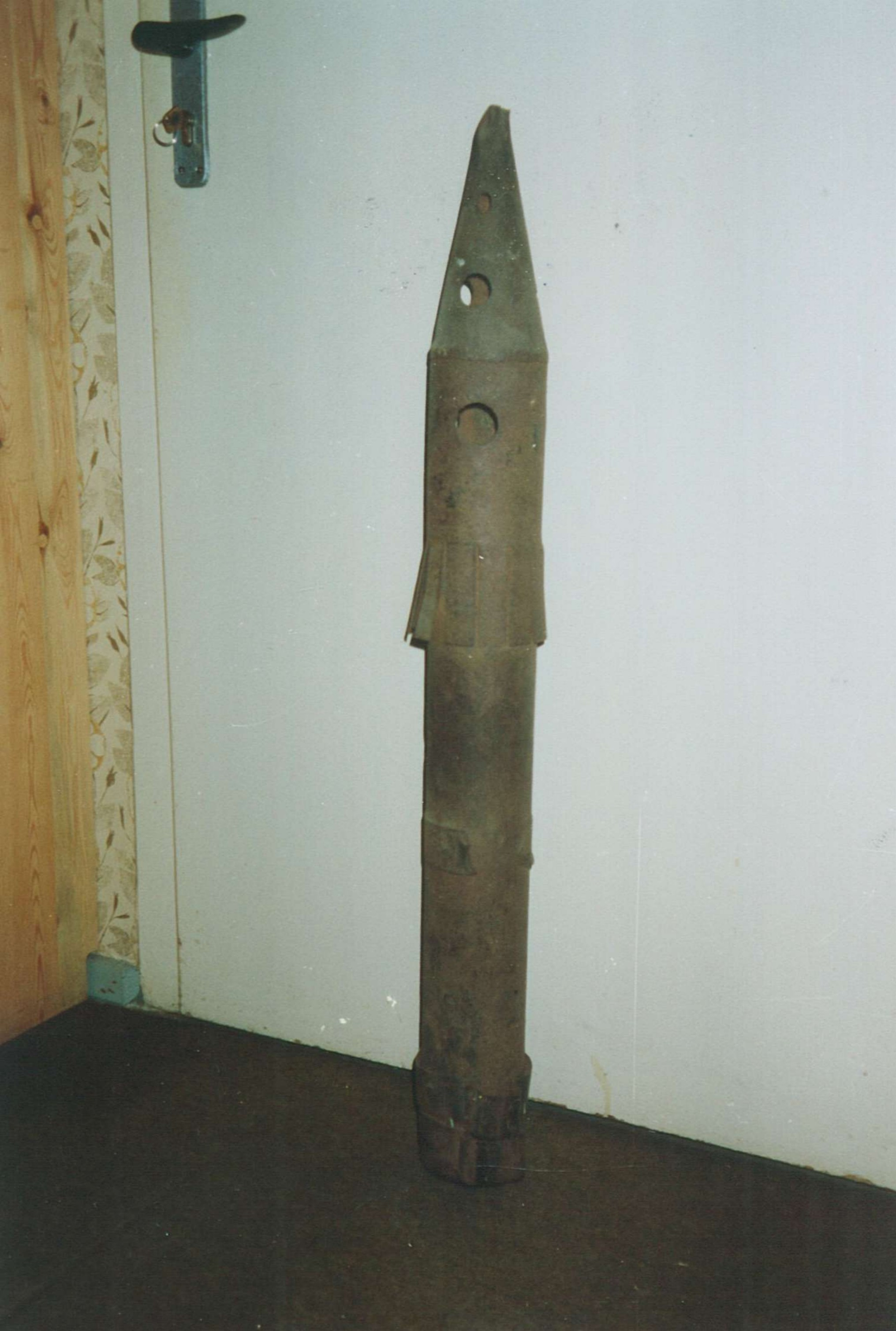
32-pounder rocket c.1813

The lack of specific accuracy with the larger rockets at long range was not a problem if the purpose was to set fire to a town or a number of moored ships; this was shown with the attack on the French Fleet in Aix and Basque roads and at the bombardment of Copenhagen. As Congreve himself had warned, however, they were of little use against fortified places, such as against Fort McHenry, because of the lack of combustible structures.

Accuracy at medium range remained a problem. This is illustrated by Mercer's description of G Troop Royal Horse Artillery during the retreat from Quatre Bras on 17 June 1815:

The rocketeers had placed a little iron triangle in the road with a rocket lying on it. The order to fire is given – port-fire applied – the fidgety missile begins to sputter out sparks and wriggle its tail for a second or so, and then darts forth straight up the chaussée. A gun stands right in its way, between the wheels of which the shell in the head of the rocket bursts, the gunners fall right and left… our rocketeers kept shooting off rockets, none of which ever followed the course of the first; most of them, on arriving about the middle of the ascent, took a vertical direction, whilst some actually turned back upon ourselves – and one of these, following me like a squib until its shell exploded, actually put me in more danger than all the fire of the enemy throughout the day.

== Performance and evaluation ==
=== Advantages ===
The Congreve rocket offered significant tactical advantages in mobility and deployment speed. Requiring only lightweight frames or troughs for launch, they could be assembled and fired by small crews within minutes, far more rapidly than the cumbersome carriages and teams needed for field artillery. (Note: ' A hundred men on foot could hand-carry 10 frames and 300 light rockets to the front lines and discharge all 300 rockets in less than 10 minutes. ') A team of four horses could carry 4 frames and 72 projectiles, the same as a field piece. Their adaptability extended to naval applications, where rockets could be launched from ship rails or small boats without the recoil stability issues that plagued cannon fire at sea.

The psychological effects of the rockets proved particularly valuable. Their audible ignition produced a distinctive shrill whistle, whilst visible smoke trails created an aura of unpredictability that induced panic, especially amongst troops and cavalry unfamiliar with the weapon. Eyewitness accounts from battles such as Leipzig in 1813 describe how massed rocket salvos caused horses to bolt and infantry to scatter due to the novel sensory effects rather than direct casualties.

The sealed composition offered superior storage stability compared to loose gunpowder, with service records confirming functionality after prolonged warehousing even in damp maritime environments where conventional powder charges frequently failed.

=== Limitations ===
The rocket's accuracy was severely compromised by inherent design flaws. Aerodynamic instability and sensitivity to wind resulted in trajectory deviations often exceeding tens of yards even at moderate ranges around 1,200 yards. Range tests and battlefield reports consistently showed dispersions that could reach hundreds of yards, with hit rates on specific targets far below 10% under controlled conditions. This unreliability confined their utility to indiscriminate area bombardment rather than precision strikes.

Reliability issues further undermined operational effectiveness, with frequent misfires, duds and erratic flight paths stemming from inconsistent gunpowder composition and rudimentary construction methods. Testing of similar systems yielded serviceability rates of approximately 60%, highlighting systematic defects in ignition and structural integrity.

=== Comparative effectiveness ===
Compared to conventional artillery, Congreve rockets demonstrated markedly inferior precision. Historical tests indicated cannons achieved dispersion patterns typically under 10-20 yards at 1,000 yards range, whilst rockets scattered over hundreds of yards under similar conditions. Despite this, rockets offered advantages in rate of fire, with volleys of 10-12 projectiles per minute per launcher compared to 2-3 rounds for a field gun.

Data from Waterloo recorded negligible structural damage to fortifications despite mass salvos, with most impacts causing superficial fires rather than decisive casualties. Comparative evaluations highlighted rockets' niche utility in rapid area-denial barrages, though their mean effective range of 1,500-2,000 yards yielded hit probabilities below 5% on point targets versus artillery's 20-30%. Dud rates of 10-20% from powder inconsistencies further limited their tactical equivalence to guns, confining them to supplementary roles.

A critical assessment of their combat record reveals that whilst rockets enhanced mobility and psychological disruption, their lethality remained secondary to terror effects. One analysis noted that across nearly three years of widespread deployment in the Napoleonic Wars and War of 1812, confirmed enemy casualties from rockets totalled remarkably few, underscoring high failure rates and reliance on psychological rather than kinetic impact.

== Use of Congreve rockets ==
=== Napoleonic Wars ===
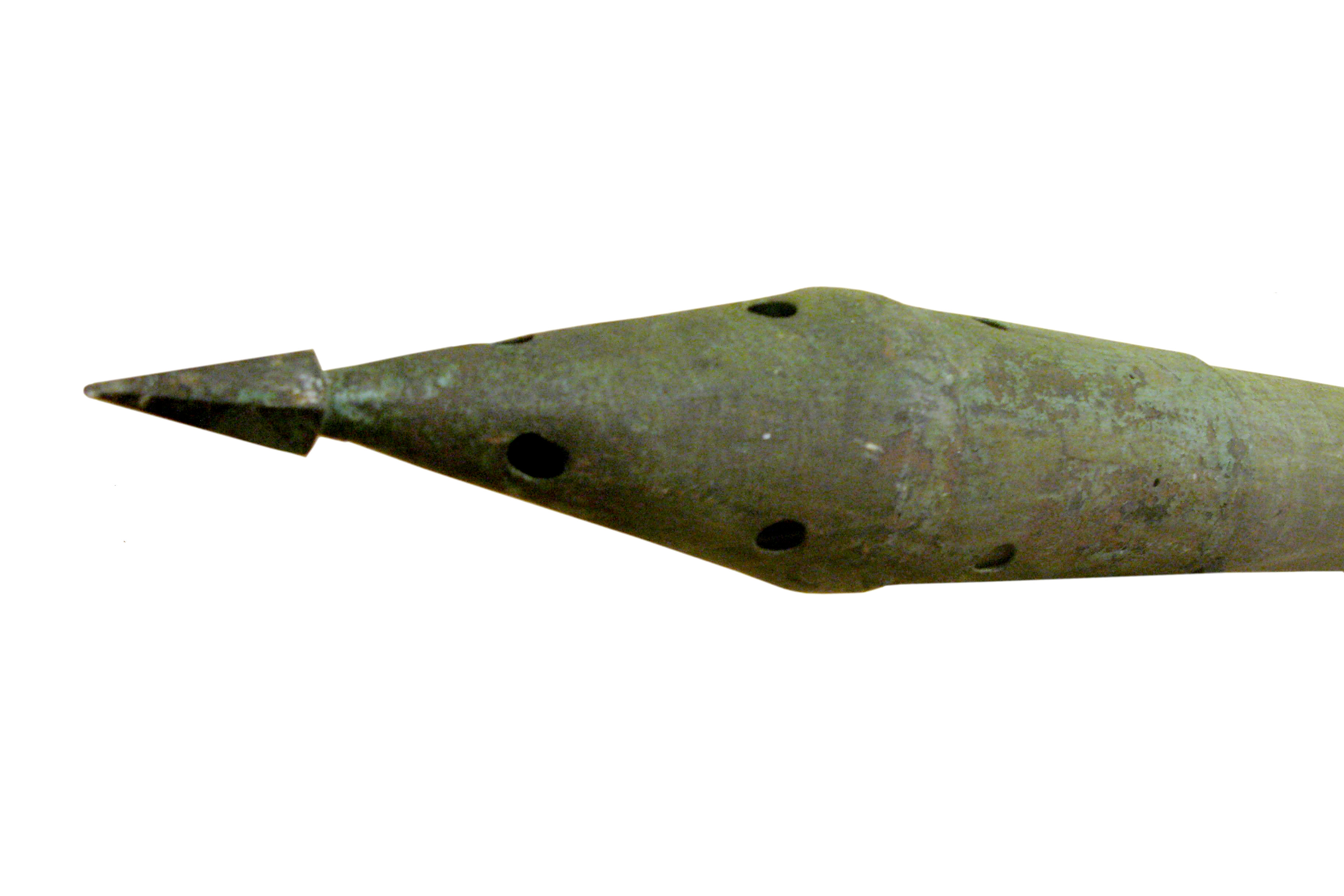
Tip of an early Congreve rocket of the Napoleonic Wars, on display at Paris Naval Museum

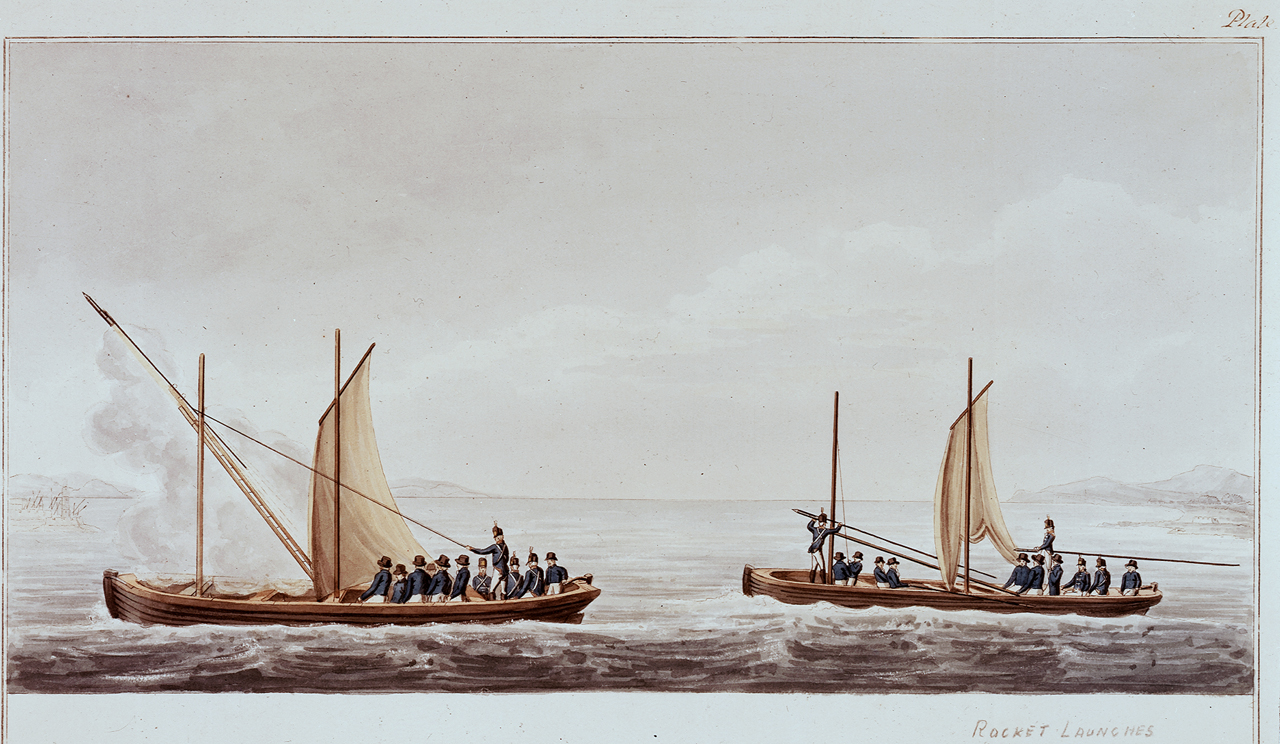
"Use of rockets from boats" – An illustration from William Congreve's book

The main user of Congreve rockets during the Napoleonic Wars was the Royal Navy, and men from the Royal Marine Artillery became experts in their use. The navy converted HMS Galgo and Erebus into rocket ships. The army became involved and was represented by various rocket detachments that changed into the two Rocket Troops, Royal Horse Artillery, on 1 January 1814.

In the autumn of 1804, the government decided upon an attack on Boulogne for the first test. William Sidney Smith was chosen to lead the expedition, accompanied by Congreve. Strong winds and rough seas hampered the operations on both the 20th and 21st, and the attack was not successful.

In April 1806, Rear Admiral Sidney Smith took rockets on a little-known mission to the Mediterranean to aid Sicily and the Kingdom of Naples in their struggle against the French. It was perhaps at Gaeta, near Naples, that Congreve's rockets had their first successful debut in battle. The second Boulogne rocket expedition, however, is more famous and is usually considered the first successful attempt.

On 8–9 October 1806, Commodore Edward Owen attacked the French flotilla at Boulogne. Captain William Jackson aboard HMS Musquito directed the boats firing 32-pound Congreve rockets. As night drew in on the channel, 24 cutters fitted with rocket frames formed a line and fired some 2,000 rockets at Boulogne. The barrage took only 30 minutes. Apparently the attack set a number of fires, but otherwise had limited effect. Still, it was enough to lead the British to employ rockets on a number of further occasions.

In 1807, Copenhagen was bombarded by more than 14,000 missiles in the form of metal balls, explosive and incendiary bombs from cannons and mortars, and about 300 Congreve rockets. The rockets contributed to the conflagration of the city.

The lighter, six-pounder battlefield rockets had been sent on the second Egyptian campaign in 1807, a further field trial which proved to be unsuccessful.

Congreve accompanied Lord Cochrane in the fire-ship, rocket, and shell attack on the French Fleet in Aix and Basque roads on 11 April 1809.

The Walcheren Campaign in 1809 saw the deployment of HMS Galgo, a merchant sloop converted to a warship and then converted to fire Congreve rockets from 21 "rocket scuttles"' installed in her broadside. This rocket ship was deployed at the naval bombardment of Flushing, where they wrought such havoc that General Monnet, the French commandant, made a formal protest to Lord Chatham against their use. Congreve was also present at this engagement and commanded five land frames.

In 1810, Wellington agreed to a field trial of Congreve's new 12-pounder rocket carrying case shot. It was not successful and was withdrawn.

In May 1813, a detachment which had been training with rockets at Woolwich under Second Captain Richard Bogue RHA was inspected by a committee of Royal Artillery officers who recommended that it be tried in combat. On 7 June 1813, Bogue's unit was designated the "Rocket Brigade". At the same time as being granted its new title, The Rocket Brigade was ordered to be augmented and to proceed on active service, with orders to join the Army of the North commanded by Bernadotte, the Crown Prince of Sweden. Using the modified 12-pounder at low trajectory from ground firing-troughs, the brigade saw action at the Battle of Gohrde and at the Battle of Leipzig on 18 October 1813, where it was successfully employed to attack the French stronghold of Paunsdorf, occupied by five French and Saxon battalions. Captain Bogue was however killed by a sharpshooter in the subsequent cavalry charge, and the village of Paunsdorf was eventually retaken by the French Imperial Guard. In the continuing campaign, the Rocket Brigade was also used in the sieges of Frederiksfort and Glückstadt, which surrendered on 13 December 1813 and 5 January 1814, respectively. On 1 January 1814, the unit assumed the title of the "2nd Rocket Troop RHA" and on 18 January it received orders to join the force under the orders of Sir Thomas Graham in Holland.

In September 1813, Wellington agreed, with much reservation, that rockets could be sent out to join the army in Spain. On 3 October 1813, another Royal Artillery detachment embarked from Woolwich, trained in firing rockets. This group was called the "Rocket Company" and consisted of almost sixty men under Captain Lane. On 1 January 1814, together with another detachment under Captain Eliot, it assumed the title of the "1st Rocket Troop RHA". Captain Lane's rockets were very successfully deployed at the crossing of the Adour on 23 February 1814 and in the final battle in the Peninsular War at the Battle of Toulouse on 10 April 1814. Later that year, they were sent to be part of the disastrous expedition against the American Army at New Orleans, in Louisiana.

By the time of the Waterloo campaign on 30 April 1815, the command of the 2nd Rocket Troop was formally taken over by Captain Whinyates. Wellington remained averse to rockets, so Whinyates took just 800 rockets into the field, as well as five 6-pounder guns; it would appear that the rockets replaced the usual howitzer in the structure of the troop.

=== War of 1812 ===
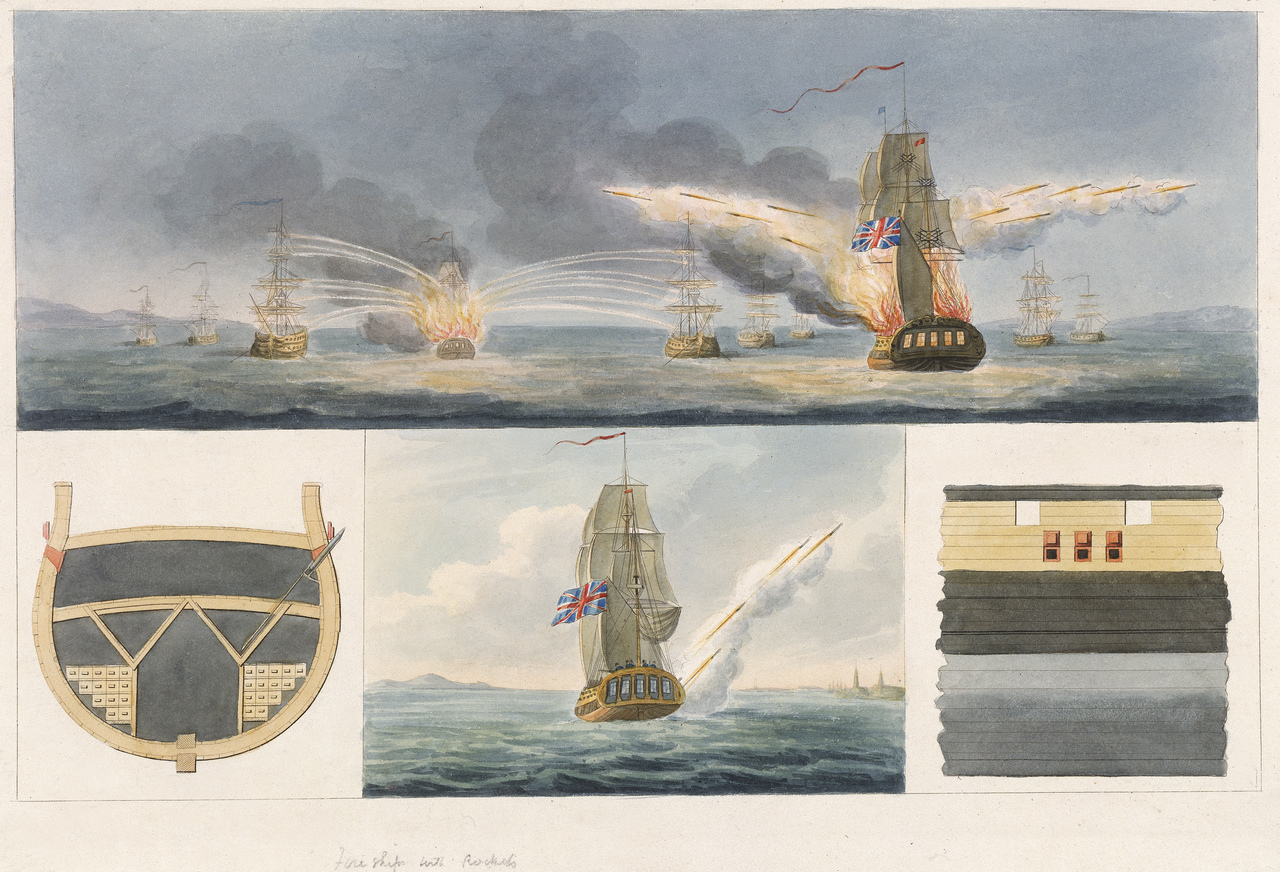
1814 depiction of rockets being fired

The Royal Marine Artillery used Congreve rockets in several engagements during this conflict. Two battalions of Royal Marines were sent to North America in 1813. Attached to each battalion was a rocket detachment, each with an establishment of 25 men, commanded by lieutenants Balchild and John Harvey Stevens. Both rocket detachments were embarked aboard the transport vessel Mariner Rockets were used in the engagements at Fort Oswego and Lundy's Lane.

The British used the Congreve rocket on U.S. soil for the first time in an attack on Lewes, Delaware, on 6 and 7 April 1813. The town was bombarded for 22 hours.

A third battalion of Royal Marines arrived in North America in 1814, with an attached rocket detachment commanded by Lieutenant John Lawrence, which subsequently participated in the Chesapeake campaign. Also present was Captain Deacon of the Royal Artillery, with a 'Rocket Brigade' reporting to Captain John Michell. During this campaign, the British used rockets at the Battle of Bladensburg to rout the American forces (which led to the capture and burning of Washington, D.C.), and at the Battle of North Point.

It was the use of ship-launched Congreve rockets by the British in the bombardment of Fort McHenry in the US in 1814 that inspired a phrase in the fifth line of the first verse of the United States' national anthem, "The Star-Spangled Banner": "the rockets' red glare". HMS Erebus fired the rockets from a 32-pound rocket battery installed below the main deck, which fired through portholes or scuttles pierced in the ship's side.

In Canada, rockets were used by the British at the Second Battle of Lacolle Mills, 30 March 1814. Rockets fired by a detachment of the Royal Marine Artillery, though inaccurate, unnerved the attacking American forces, and contributed to the defence of the blockhouse and mill. Rockets were used again at the Battle of Cook's Mills, 19 October 1814. An American force, sent to destroy General Gordon Drummond's source of flour, was challenged by a contingent of infantry which was supported by a light field cannon and a frame of Congreve rockets. The rockets succeeded in discouraging the Americans from forming lines on the battlefield.

Captain Henry Lane's 1st Rocket Troop of the Royal Horse Artillery embarked at the end of 1814 in the transport vessel Mary with 40 artillerymen and 500 rockets and disembarked near New Orleans. Lieutenant Lawrence's rocket detachment took part in the final land engagement of the War of 1812 at Fort Bowyer in February 1815.

=== Bombardment of Algiers (1816) ===
Following the U.S success in the Second Barbary War, Britain decided to subjugate Algiers, which they considered the center of unwanted activity, and the Netherlands agreed to assist. The combined fleet was composed of six British ships of the line and four frigates, plus five Dutch frigates; there were also 37 gun boats, 10 mortar boats, and eight rocket boats. Lieutenant JT Fuller and 19 other ranks from the Rocket Troop accompanied the expedition, together with 2,500 rockets, and were engaged alongside the Royal Marine Artillery.

In the bombardment of Algiers the rocket boats, gun boats, and mortar boats engaged the enemy's fleet moored inside the harbour. "It was by their fire that all the ships in the port, with the exception of the outer frigate, were in flames which extended rapidly over the whole arsenal, storehouses and gun boats, exhibiting a spectacle of awful grandeur".

The following day, the Dey capitulated and accepted all the surrender terms.

=== Whale hunting (1821) ===
On her voyage to the Greenland whale fishery in 1821 Fame carried Congreve rockets. Sir William Congreve equipped her with rockets at his own expense to test their utility in whaling hunting. The Master General of Ordnance and the First Lord of the Admiralty had Lieutenant Colquhoun and two Marine artillerymen accompany the rockets. Captain Scoresby wrote a letter from the Greenland fishery in June reporting that the rockets had been a great success. Subsequent reports made clear that the rockets were fired from about 40 yards and were highly effective in killing whales that had already been conventionally harpooned.

A separate trial took place on another whaler. A letter from Captain Kay, of the ship Margaret, of London, dated 7 September, addressed to Lieut. Colquhoun, R.A., says:

I have taken the liberty of inclosing you an account of a few trials I have made of Congreve's Rockets. Fearing the harpooners would not fire it correctly, I had determined to try its effect myself, and it was not until the 8th June that an opportunity presented. Early on that morning a whale, of the largest size, was discovered near the ship; I immediately pursued it, and when sufficiently near, fired a rocket into its side; the effect it had on the fish was tremendous – every joint in its body shook, and, after lying for a few seconds in this agitated way, it turned on its back and died. It appeared on flinching, that the rocket had penetrated through the blubber and exploded in the crann (sic) near the ribs; the stick and lower part of the rocket was taken out entire, the upper part was blown to pieces. My next attempt was on the 9th July, on a whale of the same size as the former, but owing to the rapid motion of the fish, and a heavy swell of the sea, which rendered the boat unsteady, the rocket entered below the middle part of the body, in consequence of which its effect was considerably lessened, its frame, however, was much shook by the explosion, and it immediately sunk, but rose again, blowing an immense quantity of blood: it was then struck with a harpoon, and killed with lances. On flinching, part of the stick of the rocket could only by found; it therefore appears probable that the rocket had burst in the inside of the fish.

In December Lieutenant Colquohon demonstrated the use of the rockets at Annapolis, Maryland. A newspaper story gave a detailed account of the experiments he performed.

=== First Anglo-Burmese War ===
A new shipment of Congreve rockets – which the Burmese had never seen – were used in the closing phase of the Battle of Yangon (May–December 1824) and in the subsequent battle of Danubyu (March–April 1825) where rocket fire stopped fighting elephants.

=== Congress Poland and November Uprising ===
Having witnessed the effects of incendiary rockets on grain warehouses of Danzig in 1813, artillery captain Józef Bem of the Kingdom of Poland started his own experiments with what was then called in Polish raca kongrewska. These culminated in his 1819 report Notes sur les fusées incendiaires (German edition: Erfahrungen über die Congrevischen Brand-Raketen bis zum Jahre 1819 in der Königlichen Polnischen Artillerie gesammelt, Weimar, 1820). The research took place in the Warsaw Arsenal, where captain Józef Kosiński also developed the multiple-rocket launchers adapted from horse artillery gun carriage.

The 1st Rocketeer Corps was formed in 1822 under the command of brigade general Pierre Charles Bontemps and received its launchers in 1823. The unit received its baptism of fire during the Polish–Russian War 1830–31. The rocket salvos fired by captain Karol Skalski's rocketeers during the twilight hours of the Battle of Olszynka Grochowska (25 February 1831) disrupted the Russian cavalry charges and forced them to retreat, which changed the tide of battle. The rockets were also used several times (over a thousand stockpiled) by Polish freedom fighters during the final Battle of Warsaw (September 1831) in defence of the city.

=== Portuguese Civil War ===
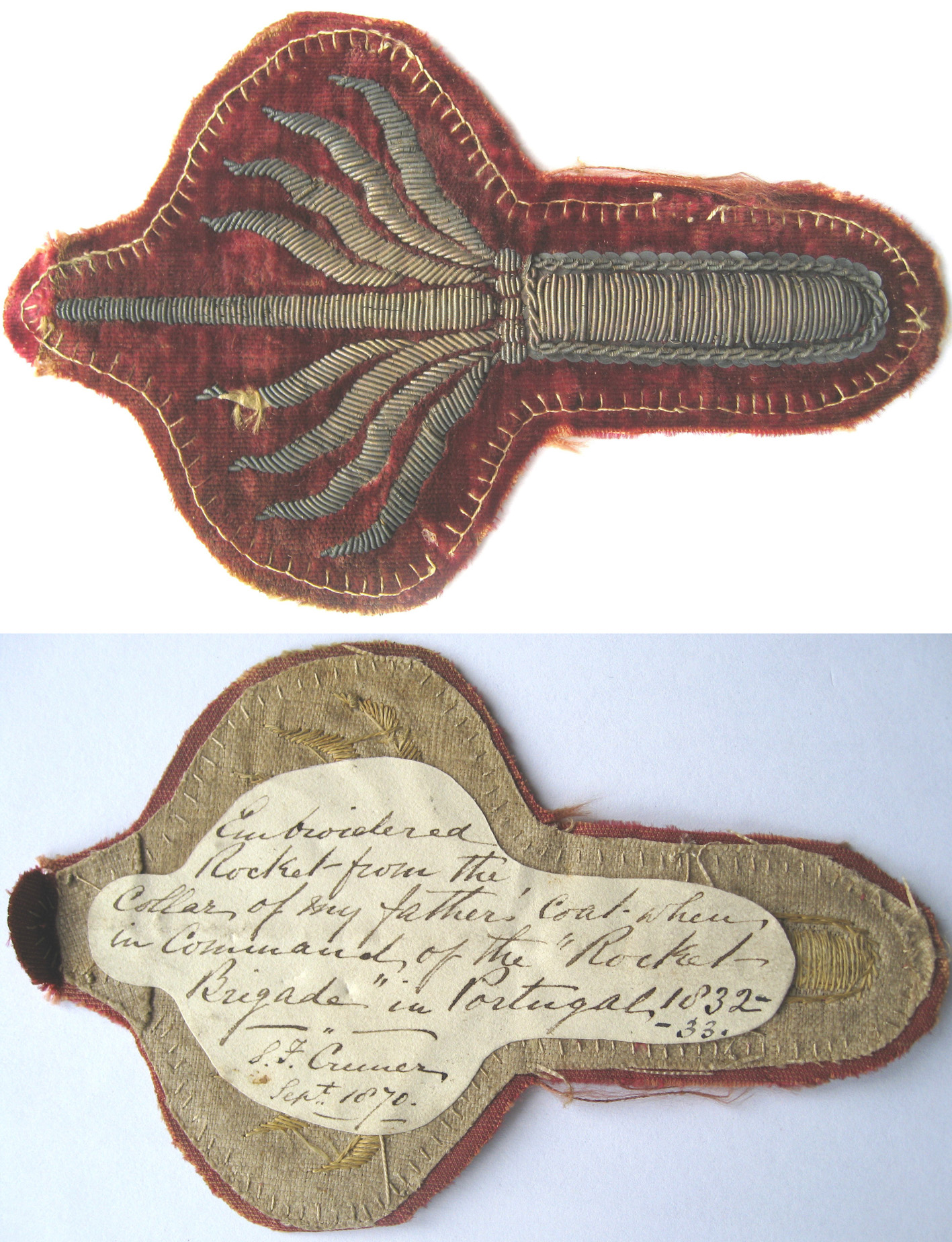
Congreve rocket patch, from Portugal campaign, 1832–33

During the Portuguese Civil War, Congreve rockets were employed extensively by both Liberal and Miguelite forces.

=== Opium Wars ===
Congreve rockets were used from the bombardment of the Canton ports, by Nemesis (1839) in January 1841, to their use at the Battle of Palikao, in September 1860.

=== New Zealand Wars ===
During the period of the New Zealand Wars, British forces used rockets against Māori fortifications, along with cannons and mortars, to limited effect.

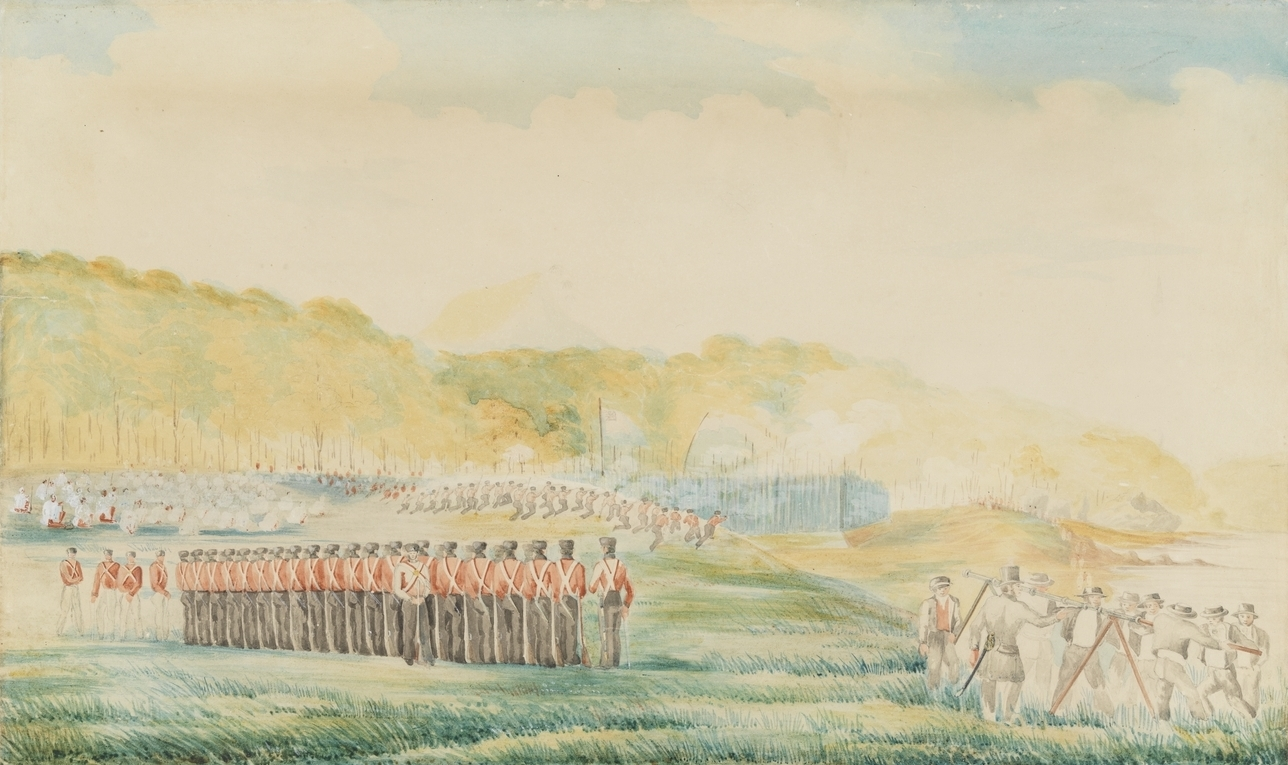
Royal Navy rocket brigade at the Battle of Puketutu, May 1845

During the Battle of Puketutu, 8 May 1845, a Royal Navy rocket brigade made up of Lieutenant Charles Randle Egerton, HMS North Star, commanding, Lieutenants Alleyne Bland, HMS Racehorse, and Leeds, HEICS Elphinstone, directing the rockets, and eight seamen, fired 12 rockets at Te Kahika pā, with a view to driving the defenders out. In consequence of the rocket-tube being positioned too close, rockets flew over and half-a-mile beyond, one struck the earth in front of the pā and exploded, and another struck high up on the palisade, went through, and apparently ignited two places. The defenders soon extinguished fires.

It was mentioned, some-time later, that the rocket brigade had forgotten to bring the quadrant, without which taking aim was impossible. Though the defending chief Hōne Heke believed these rockets could do no harm, allied Maori, in a discussion of events with the interpreter, J Merrett, agreed with the opinion that had the rockets succeeded in setting fire to the pā, the siege would have been over by mid-day.

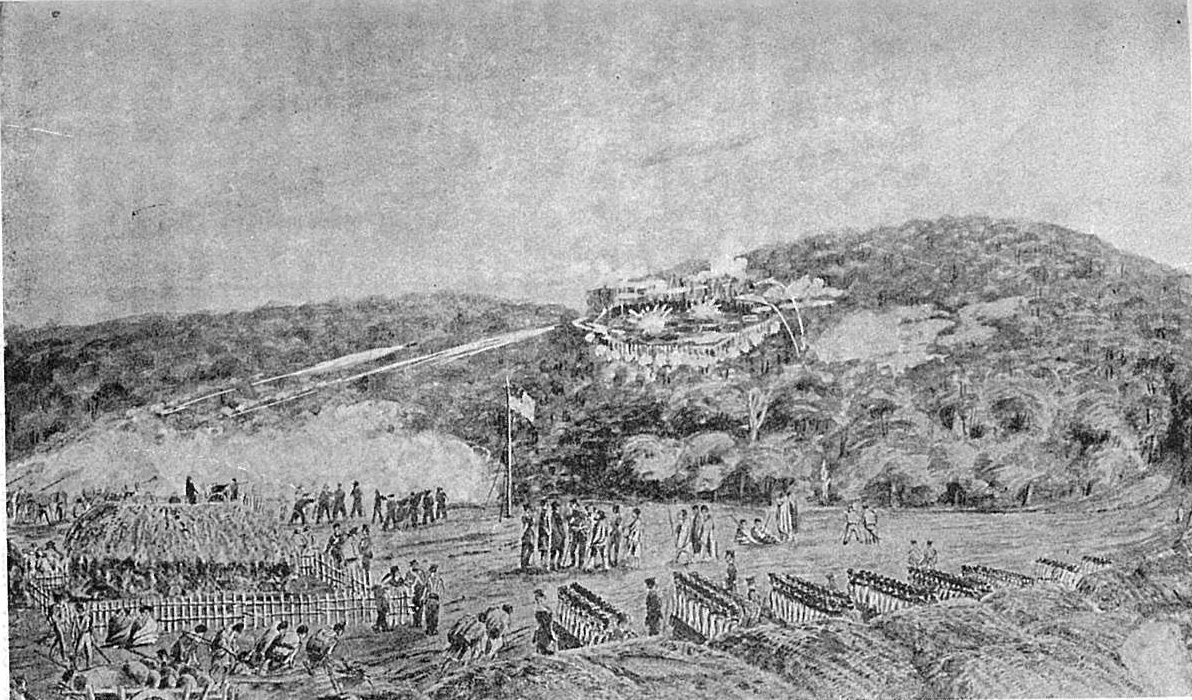
Royal Navy rocket brigade at the bombardment of Ruapekapeka pā, January 1846

At the Battle of Ruapekapeka, December 1845–January 1846, Egerton's rocket brigade, located at the British main camp, operated two of HMS North Star's rocket-tubes—24-pounder and 12-pounder. They accurately fired rockets into Ruapekapeka pā on 31 December 1845 and each day thereafter. Captain Thomas Bernard Collinson, RE, later remarked:

During this time some trial shots were made from the 650 yards with guns and 24-pounder rockets; the latter rather failed; they must have been bad rockets, as Colonel Despard supposes, otherwise these weapons are most useful in such service for firing into pahs; and from their portability, a great many can be carried with a body of troops without delaying them.

On 10 January 1846 all batteries opened fire all day, creating two small breaches in the outer stockade. A watercolour by Major Cyprian Bridge or Sergeant John Williams, 58th Regiment, depicts two rocket-tubes in action on that day.

=== American Civil War ===
The Confederate forces reportedly experimented with Congreve rockets, a British-designed explosive that had previously seen action in the War of 1812. These weapons resembled large bottle rockets and were so inaccurate that they never saw widespread use.

=== Triple Alliance War ===
During the war between Brazil, Uruguay and Argentina against Paraguay (1865–1870), the Paraguayans deployed Congreve rockets in several battles including: the Battle of the Riachuelo (11 June 1865) when land-based rockets were used against Brazilian naval forces without success; the Battle of Paso de las Cuevas (12 August 1865) when the Paraguayans used artillery and rockets against a passing fleet of 12 Brazilian ships and one Argentinian ship; the combat of Corrales (31 January 1866) when Paraguayan rockets were used against Allied infantry and cavalry; the Battle of Tuyutí (24 May 1866) when Paraguayan forces used them to attack advancing allied cavalry; the Battle of Yataytí Corá (10 July 1866) where Paraguay used two launchers of 68-pound rockets; and again in Yataytí Corá (20 January 1867) when Paraguayan rockets caused a fire in the Argentinian camp. The Brazilian Navy employed them during the Battle of Curupayti (22 September 1866), trying to destroy the reinforced Paraguayan trench field, but the rockets fell short.

=== Crimean War and Indian Rebellion of 1857 ===
During the Crimean War (1853–1856) and the Indian Rebellion of 1857, marines and sailors from the Royal Navy used Congreve rockets. "Bluejackets" armed with rockets from HMS Shannon and HMS Pearl, under the command of Captain William Peel, were among the Naval Brigade participating in the force led by Sir Colin Campbell at the Second Relief of Lucknow. There is an eye-witness narrative of the taking of the heavily-fortified Shah Najaf mosque written by William Forbes Mitchell: at a late stage Captain Peel had ... brought his infernal machine, known as a rocket battery, to the front, and sent a volley of rockets through the crowd on the ramparts.. After a second salvo from the rocket battery, many of the rebels fled and the mosque was finally taken by storm. When Forbes-Mitchell entered the enclosure he found only numerous dead defenders. According to a modern historian, "Peel's rockets had tipped the scale and the Shah Najaf fell to the British just as they had been about to fall back".

== Surviving rockets ==
As a weapon, Congreve rockets remained in regular use until the 1850s, when they were superseded by the improved spinning design by William Hale. In the 1870s, Congreve rockets were used to carry rescue lines to vessels in distress, gradually superseding the mortar of Captain Manby that had been in operation from 1808 and rockets designed by John Dennett (1780–1852) that had been deployed in the late 1820s. These were first used to carry out a rescue in 1832 and used in the Irex rescue as late as 1890.

A wide variety of Congreve rockets were displayed at Firepower - The Royal Artillery Museum in South-East London, ranging in size from 3 to 300 pounds (1.4 to 136.1 kg). The Science Museum has two eighteenth-century Indian war rockets in its collection. The Musée national de la Marine in Paris also features one rocket. The Stonington Historical Society in Stonington, Connecticut, has one rocket in their collection that was fired at the town by the British in August 1814 during the Battle of Stonington. The Museum of Artillery at the Rotunda in Woolwich holds a surviving example of Congreve's whaling rocket adaptation, complete with launcher, representing his 1820-21 experimental work with Lieutenant Colquhoun.

Other examples in the United States can be seen at The Smithsonian National Museum and the Fort McHenry Museum. The Wittenburg Museum in Germany has a later-era rocket, and there is a reproduction of it in the Leipzig Museum; there is also one in a private collection in Leipzig.

Puke Ariki holds a corroded example of a Congreve / Boxer rocket used by British forces during the First Taranaki War (1860–1861) in New Zealand, found in a swamp at Manukorihi; the village was destroyed in 1860.

== Published descriptions ==
- A Concise Account of the Origin and Progress of the Rocket System, by William Congreve, son of the arsenal's commandant, was published in 1807.
- Congreve, Sir William (1827). A Treatise on the General Principles, Powers, and Facility of Application of the Congreve Rocket System. London: Longman, Rees, Orme, Brown, and Green.
- Winter, Frank H. (1990). The First Golden Age of Rocketry: Congreve and Hale Rockets of the Nineteenth Century. Smithsonian Institution Press. ISBN 0-87474-987-5..
- Franklin, Carl. British Rockets of the Napoleonic and Colonial Wars 1805-1901. Spellmount Ltd. ISBN 978-1-86227-313-9.
- Werrett, Simon (2009). "William Congreve's Rational Rockets". Notes & Records of the Royal Society (63): 35–56. doi:10.1098/rsnr.2008.0039. JSTOR 40647192.
