= HMS Galgo (1801) =

UK naval sloop 1801–1814

History

United Kingdom
- Name: HMS Galgo
- Namesake: Galgo Español
- Builder: Randall & Co.
- Acquired: 2 March 1801 by purchase
- Fate: Sold 1814

General characteristics
- Class & type: ship-sloop
- Tons burthen: 353 bm
- Length: 102 ft (31 m) (overall); 81 ft 3 in (24.77 m) (keel)
- Beam: 28 ft 7 in (8.71 m)
- Propulsion: Sails
- Sail plan: sloop
- Complement: 75 men
- Armament: Upper deck:14 × 24-pounder carronades; QD:2 × 18-pounder carronades; Between decks: 21 × rocket scuttles (1809)

HMS Galgo was the mercantile Garland, which the British Admiralty bought in 1801. She had a brief career in the Channel before she was laid-up in ordinary. She was refitted as a rocket ship in 1809, the Royal Navy's (and almost certainly the world's) first, and served as such but without distinction in the unsuccessful Walcheren Campaign. (Note: Winter refers to Galgo as Golago.) She then was laid-up again before she was sold in 1814.

== Career ==
The Royal Navy commissioned Galgo in February 1801 under Commander Richard Hawkins, for the Downs. They named her Galgo, there being a Garland in service and Galgo having been lost a few months earlier. She spent February to March fitting out at Deptford. In August, Hawkins came into the Downs from Ostend and reported to Admiral Lord Nelson that the number of boats there and their size was such that they did not pose any threat of a French invasion. Then on 28 April 1802, Hawkins received promotion to post captain.

In May 1802 Commander Michael Dod (or Dodd) took command, for the North Sea. However, this was just after the Treaty of Amiens had ended the war with France. On 29 July 1802, Dod sailed Galgo from Portsmouth for Newfoundland. She returned to Portsmouth on 26 November.

Four months later, on 17 March 1803, Galgo came into Plymouth having lost her foremast in a violent gale of wind in Mount's Bay a few days earlier. Atalante went to retrieve and tow her. As she arrived she signaled that she needed assistance and boats came out to warp her in to the harbour so that she might effect repairs. By 30 March Galgo had a new mast and she sailed between St Nicholas's Island and Cornwall before anchoring in Cawsand Bay.

In mid-June 1803, after the resumption of war with France, Galgo sent into Plymouth a Dutch galliot that she had detained. In Spring 1804, Galgo joined Sir Sidney Smith's squadron off Helvoet, Flushing, and Ostende.

In May 1804, Galgo and Inspector cooperated in an unsuccessful attempt to cutout the pram Ville d'Anvers from Ostend. then on 23 June, Galgo and Inspector observed 26 schuyts coming from Ostend and going towards Flushing. They proceeded to keep up a running fire on these vessels for about two hours, while enduring fire from shore batteries. Eventually, the two British vessels hauled off, fearful of running aground on the Stroom sand, having succeeded in driving only one Dutch vessel aground, but having sustained no casualties themselves.

In January 1805 Galgo escorted three praams from Hull, where they had been built, to Portsmouth, where they were to be fitted out. Thereafter, she was apparently laid up in ordinary at Sheerness.

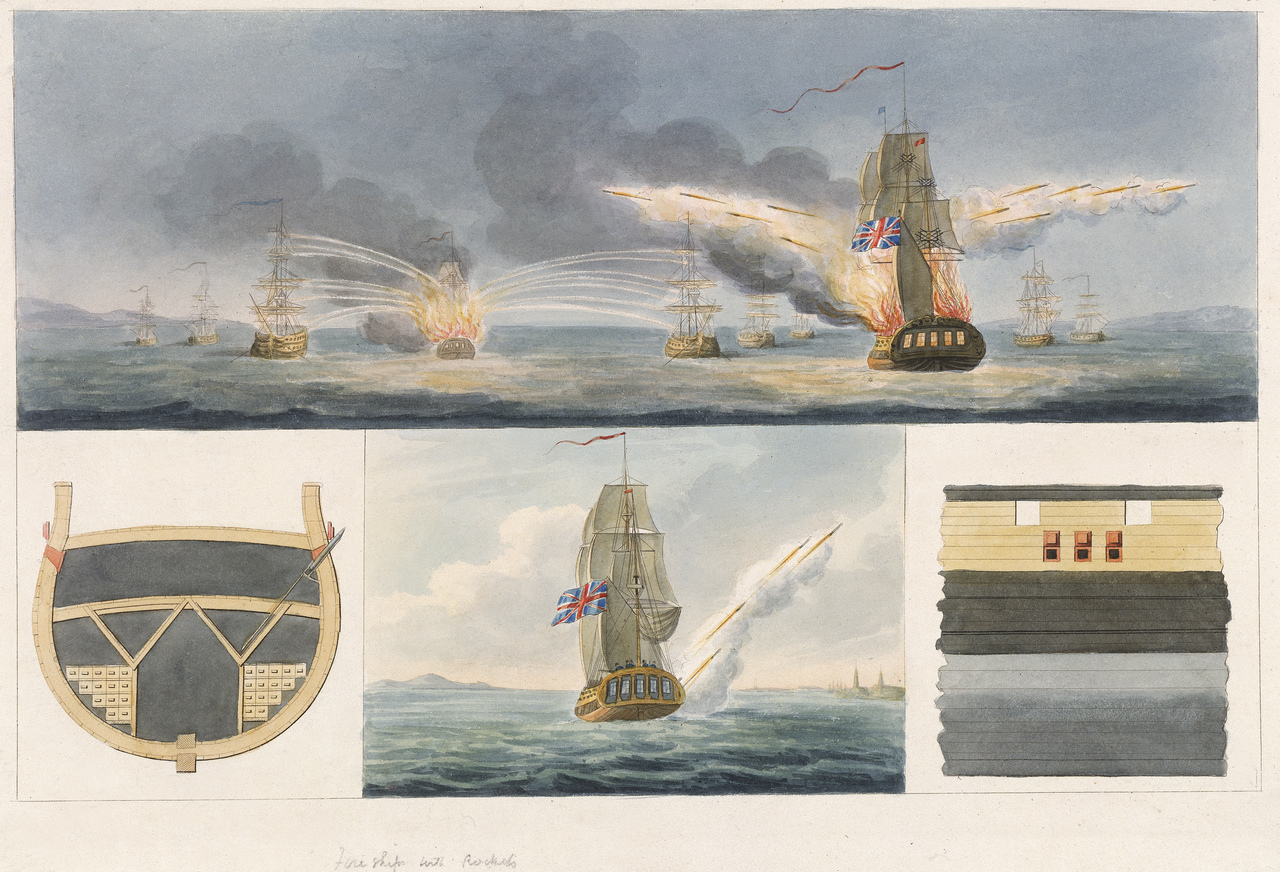
1814 depiction of rockets being fired

Between April 1808 and May 1809 she was being fitted at Woolwich for the defense of Gibraltar Bay. However, instead of being sent there, she was further fitted between May and July 1809 at Deptford, but apparently as a rocket ship to fire Congreve rockets. Congreve had Galgo fitted with 21 scuttles (angled tubes) on her between deck, firing out through broadside ports. To prevent the rockets's exhaust from entering the vessel he had the scuttles fitted with iron shutters. (Congreve developed an improved design later that he had fitted to Erebus.)

Galgo arrived late to the unsuccessful Walcheren Expedition, which took place between 30 July and 9 August 1809. She missed the bombardment of Ramakins. On 13 August she was part of a squadron under Sir Home Riggs Popham that pushed up the West Scheld, but saw no action. This is the only mention of Galgo in dispatches from the campaign published in the London Gazette. Clearly, Galgo's part in the campaign was minimal, though she may have fired her rockets at the bombardment of Flushing. Still, she was among the myriad vessels listed as qualifying for the prize money from the campaign.

Galgo returned to Portsmouth in December 1809. In February 1810 Galgo was again laid up at Woolwich. There, between February and April 1814, she was fitted as a receiving ship for Gravesend.

== Fate ==
The Admiralty offered Galgo for sale on 23 February 1814. She was sold for £1,320 on 9 June 1814.
