= Jack Dryden =

English footballer

John Dryden
Personal information
- Date of birth: 21 August 1908
- Place of birth: Broomhill, England
- Date of death: 1975 (aged 66–67)
- Height: 5 ft 9 in (1.75 m)
- Position: Winger

Senior career*
Years	Team	Apps	(Gls)
1932–1934	Newcastle United	5	(1)
1934–1935	Exeter City	20	(5)
1935–1936	Sheffield United	19	(5)
1936–1938	Bristol City	63	(13)
1938–1940	Burnley	4	(2)
- * Club domestic league appearances and goals

John R. Dryden (21 August 1908 – 1975) was an English professional association footballer who played as a winger for a number of Football League clubs in the 1930s before his career was interrupted by the Second World War.
