= John Stephens =

John Stephens may refer to:

== Entertainment ==
- John Legend (John Stephens, born 1978), American musician
- John M. Stephens (1932–2015), American camera operator and cinematographer
- John Stephens (TV producer), American television producer and screenwriter
- John Stephens, musician and member of the band Neve

== Politicians ==
- John Stephens (MP for Bristol), MP for Bristol (UK Parliament constituency), 1391–1393
- John Stephens (MP for Hythe) (fl.1571)
- John H. Stephens (1847–1924), U.S. Representative from Texas
- John Stephens (English politician) (1622–1679), English MP for Bristol, 1660
- John W. Stephens (1834–1870), state senator from North Carolina
- John Stephens (Illinois politician), coroner of Cook County

== Sports ==
- John Stephens (American football) (1966–2009), American football player
- John Stephens (Australian footballer) (born 1950), Australian rules footballer
- John Stephens (1920s pitcher) (born 1897), American baseball player
- John Stephens (2000s pitcher) (born 1979), Australian pitcher in Major League Baseball
- John Stephens (rugby league), English rugby league footballer
- John Stephens (rugby union), Welsh international rugby union player
- John Stephens, Australian tennis player in 1964 Wimbledon Championships – Men's Singles

== Others ==
- John Lloyd Stephens (1805–1852), American explorer, writer, and diplomat
- John Stephens (editor) (1806–1850), owner and editor of the South Australian Register
- John William Watson Stephens (1865–1946), British parasitologist
- John Riccardo Stephens (1827–1912), teacher, preacher, doctor in South Australia
- John Sturge Stephens (1891–1954), Quaker, conscientious objector, history lecturer
- John Stephens (bishop), Canadian Anglican bishop
- Frank Stephens (advocate) (John Franklin Stephens, born 1981/82), American disability advocate, actor and athlete

== See also ==
- John Stephen (1934–2004), Scottish clothes designer
- Jonathan Stephens (born 1960), British civil servant
- Jack Stephens (disambiguation)
- John Stephen (disambiguation)
- John Stevens (disambiguation)
- Stephen Johns (disambiguation)
