= Munroe Effect (band) =

English alternative rock band

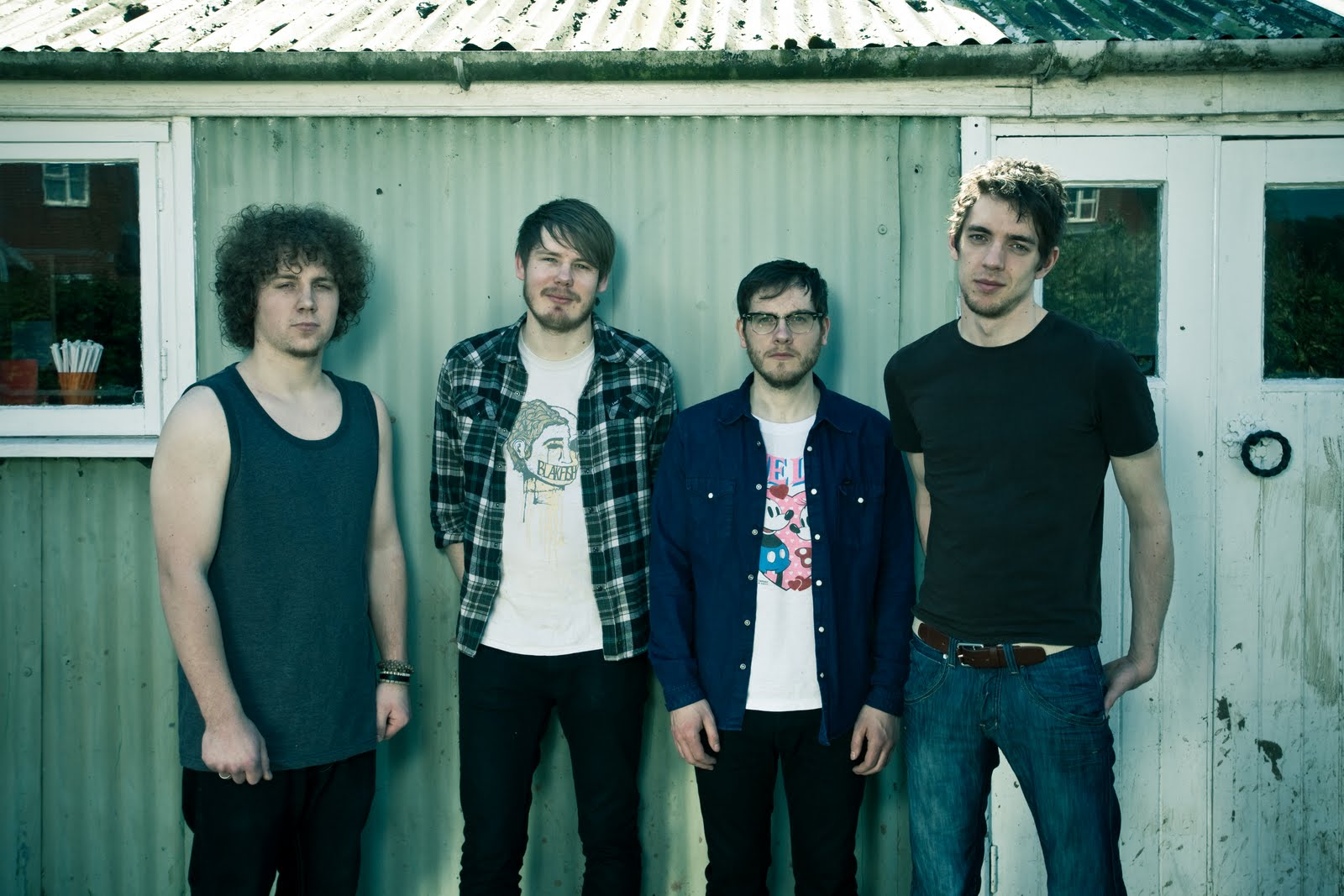

Background information
- Origin: Portsmouth, England
- Genre: Alternative rock
- Years active: 2006–2014
- Labels: Function Records, Dead Planet Records
- Members: Daniel Sutton-Johanson; Andrew Waterman; Richard Worrall; Jack Stephens
- Past members: James Teale
- Website: munroeeffect.co.uk

Munroe Effect were an underground alternative rock band formed in the summer of 2006, in Portsmouth, England. Since the debut single release "Who's Throwing Rocks/Subterranean Death Clash" in 2008, the band have released a 6-track EP you are goldmouth and their first album, ULTRAVIOLENCELAND, named after a Camille Rose Garcia painting. Munroe Effect is derived from Charles Edward Munroe's theory the Neumann Effect, otherwise known as the Munroe Effect.

== Personnel ==
- Daniel Sutton-Johanson - Vocals
- Andrew Waterman - Guitar
- Richard Worrall - Bass
- Jack Stephens - Drums

== Ultraviolenceland ==
After a family loss in late 2010, ULTRAVIOLENCELAND was finally released after a three-month delay on 30 May 2011 on Dead Planet Records, London. Since the release Munroe Effect toured extensively throughout the UK embarking on tours with The Subways, Young Guns and Gay for Johnny Depp.

== Discography ==
Year	Title	Type	Format
2008	"Subterranean Death Clash"/"Who's Throwing Rocks"	Single	Vinyl, digital download
2008	You Are Goldmouth	EP	CD digipak, digital download
2011	ULTRAVIOLENCELAND	Album	CD, digital download
