= John J. Stevens =

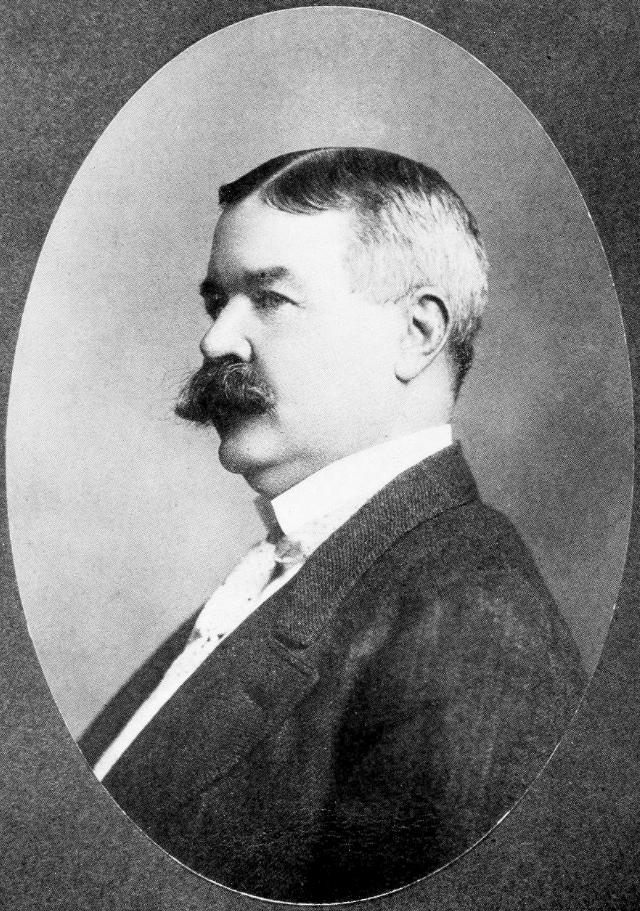
- Born: April 2, 1852; San Antonio, Texas
- Died: January 4, 1928 (aged 75); San Antonio, Texas
- Occupation: Businessman
- Political party: Republican
- Spouse: Bettie Thornton (m. 1879)
- Children: 5

Signature
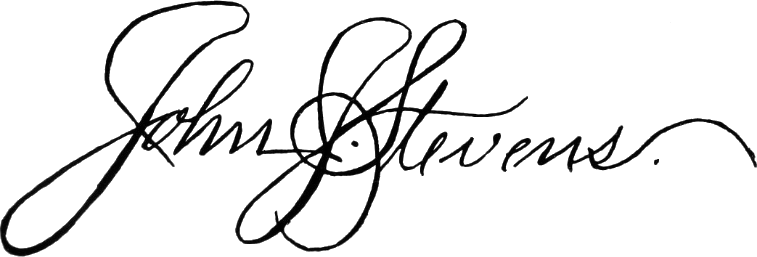

John J. Stevens (April 2, 1852 – January 4, 1928) was an American businessman.

== Biography ==
John J. Stevens was born in San Antonio, Texas on April 2, 1852. His parents were John Stevens and Mary McDermott Stevens, 1847 immigrants from County Tipperary, Ireland. He dropped out of school at age 12 to support his family, and held a succession of jobs that included employment with the county clerk's office, the military under a Colonel J. G. C. Lee, and as clerk to Secretary of State of Texas James Pearson Newcomb. An active Republican, at 18 years of age, he became the private secretary to Governor of Texas, Edmund J. Davis.

In 1874, Stevens became deputy of collector of customs in Galveston, and later clerked for the Southern Pacific Railroad in that city. He married Bettie Thornton of San Antonio in 1879, and had five children with her.

In 1900, he became owner and operator of the Hot Wells resort in San Antonio, selling his interest in 1905. Stevens became a successful business man in the city and went on to serve on the boards of Turner Gravel Company, Southern National Gas Company, the City National Bank, and the National Bank of Commerce. He became a cattle rancher, postmaster of San Antonio, a founder of the San Antonio Brewing Association and vice president of the San Antonio Waterworks.

He died in San Antonio on January 4, 1928.
