= John Stevens (New South Wales cricketer) =

Australian cricketer (born 1948)

Personal information
- Born: 22 February 1948 (age 78); Singleton, New South Wales, Australia
- Source: ESPNcricinfo, 2 February 2017

John Stevens (born 22 February 1948) is an Australian former cricketer. He played two first-class matches for New South Wales in 1970/71.

== See also ==
- List of New South Wales representative cricketers
