= Jack Stevens (rugby league) =

English rugby league footballer

Personal information
- Full name: Jack Stevens
- Born: 1 November 2002 (age 23)

Playing information
- Position: Scrum-half, Hooker
Club
Years	Team	Pld	T	G	FG	P
2022–23	Salford Red Devils	1	0	0	0	0
2024–	Swinton Lions	0	0	0	0	0
	Total	1	0	0	0	0
- Source: As of 11 February 2024

Jack Stevens is a professional rugby league footballer who plays as a scrum-half or hooker for the Swinton Lions in the RFL League 1.

== Playing career ==
=== Salford Red Devils ===
In September 2022 Stevens made his Salford debut in the Super League against the Warrington Wolves.

=== Swinton Lions ===
On 16 Oct 2023 it was reported that he had signed for Swinton Lions in the RFL League 1
