= John Peters Stevens =

American textile executive (1868–1929)

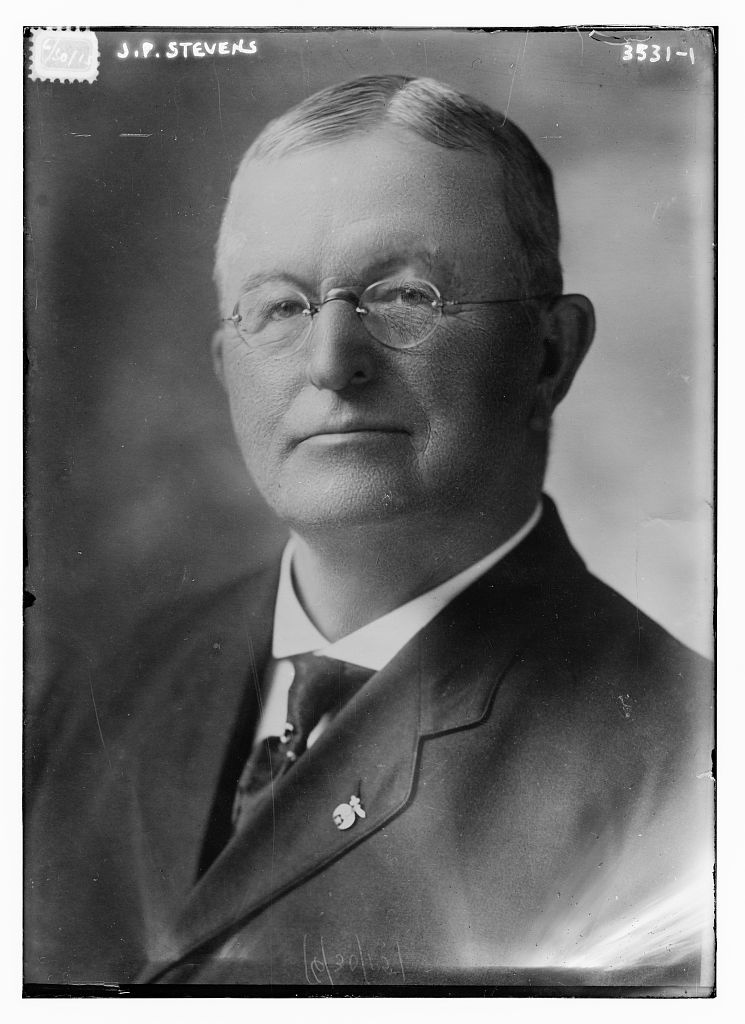
- Stevens in 1915
- Born: February 2, 1868; North Andover, Massachusetts, US
- Died: November 27, 1929 (aged 61); Plainfield, New Jersey, US
- Education: Phillips Academy
- Occupation: Business executive
- Spouse: Edna Ten Broeck (m. 1895)
- Children: Robert

John Peters Stevens (February 2, 1868 – October 27, 1929) was the CEO of the J. P. Stevens Textile Corporation. He was the president of Cotton Merchants' Association and Woolen Manufacturers' Association.

== Early life ==
Stevens was born on February 2, 1868, in North Andover, Massachusetts, to Horace Nathaniel Stevens (1837–1876) and Susan Elizabeth (née Peters) Stevens (1835–1871). He was the seventh generation descendant of John Stevens, who came to the United States in 1638. His paternal grandfather was Nathaniel Stevens (1786–1865). His uncles were U.S. Representative Charles Abbot Stevens (1816–1892), Moses Tyler Stevens (1825–1907), and George Stevens (1832–1871).

He attended Phillips Academy, Andover.

== Career ==
After leaving Philips, he entered the dry goods commission business in Boston with Faulkner, Page & Co.

In 1899, he established J.P. Stevens Textile Corporation in New York. He was the president of Cotton Merchants' Association and Woolen Manufacturers' Association, a director of the Central Hanover Bank and Trust Company, the Plainfield Trust Company, M. T. Stevens & Sons Company, Stevens Linen Works, Arragon Baldwin Cotton Mills, Watts Mills, Duneen Mills, the Lawrence Manufacturing Company, and other textile companies.

A Republican, he served as an alternate delegate to Republican National Convention from New Jersey in 1920.

== Personal life ==
On February 12, 1895, married Edna Ten Broeck (1874–1964), the daughter of Rensselaer Ten Broeck (1838–1918) and Phebe (née Wilson) Ten Broeck (1846–1916). Together, they had three sons:

- John Peter Stevens, Jr. (1897–1976), who married Edith Stevens (1899–1989). President of the Edison Township Board of Education from 1943 to 1958, President of John P. Stevens and Co. and namesake of J.P. Stevens High School in Edison, New Jersey
- Robert Ten Broeck Stevens (1899–1983), who married Dorothy Goodwin Whitney (1901–1988)
- Nathaniel Stevens, II (1900-1966), who married Ruth Alden Bovey [Stevens Family Records, Tenth Edition, 1993]

He died on October 27, 1929, in Plainfield, New Jersey.

=== Legacy ===
- J.P. Stevens High School in Edison, New Jersey, was named in his son's honor
