= John Stevens (cricketer, born 1854) =

English cricketer

Personal information
- Full name: John Stevens
- Born: 5 October 1854; Guildford, Surrey, England
- Batting: Right-handed

Domestic team information
- Years: Team
- 1874–1875: Surrey

Career statistics
Competition	First-class
Matches	3
Runs scored	36
Batting average	9.00
100s/50s	–/–
Top score	16
Balls bowled	–
Wickets	–
Bowling average	–
5 wickets in innings	–
10 wickets in match	–
Best bowling	–
Catches/stumpings	1/–
- Source: Cricinfo, 9 June 2012

John Stevens (5 October 1854 – date of death unknown) was an English cricketer. Stevens was a right-handed batsman. He was born at Guildford, Surrey.

Stevens made three first-class appearances for Surrey, playing two matches against Sussex in 1874, and one against Cambridge University in 1875. In these three matches, he scored a total of 36 runs at an average of 9.00, with a high score of 16.
