= John Stevens (Victoria cricketer) =

Indian-born Australian cricketer

John Whitehall Stevens (c. 1811 – 30 March 1891) was an Indian-born Australian cricketer who played for Victoria. He was born in Bombay and died in Marylebone.

Stevens made a single first-class appearance for the side, during the 1851–52 season, against Tasmania. From the upper-middle order, he scored a duck in the first innings in which he batted, and five runs in the second.
