= Broomhill, Northumberland =

Village in England

Coordinates: 55.307°N 1.615°W

Broomhill
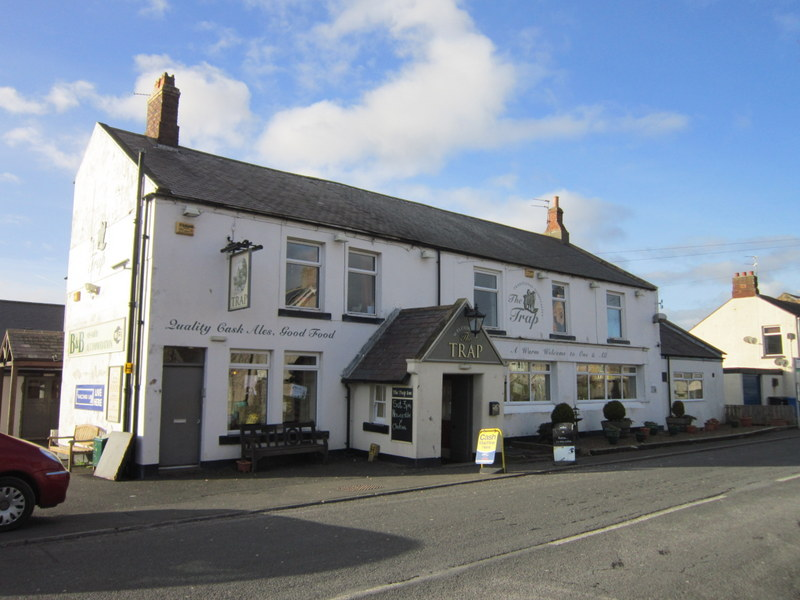
- The Trap public house

- Location within Northumberland
- OS grid reference: NU245015
- Unitary authority: Northumberland
- Ceremonial county: Northumberland
- Region: North East
- Country: England
- Sovereign state: United Kingdom
- Post town: MORPETH
- Postcode district: NE65
- Dialling code: 01670
- Police: Northumbria
- Fire: Northumberland
- Ambulance: North East
- UK Parliament: North Northumberland

Broomhill is a village in Northumberland, England. It lies to the south-west of Amble, a short distance inland from the North Sea.

Broomhill is split into two, as it lies on the border of two districts: Morpeth (the county town of Northumberland) and Alnwick. South Broomhill, which is in the District of Morpeth, is considerably larger than North Broomhill.

== Governance ==
North Broomhill is in the parliamentary constituency of Berwick-upon-Tweed.

== Notable people ==
- Jack Dryden (1908–1975), professional association footballer
