= John Harvey Stevens =

Major-General John Harvey Stevens
- Died: 1866
- Military career
- Allegiance: United Kingdom
- Branch: Royal Marines
- Rank: Major-General
- Conflicts: Napoleonic Wars; Walcheren Campaign; War of 1812; Bombardment of Algiers
- Awards: Mentioned in Despatches

Major-General John Harvey Stevens (1790–1866) was a career officer in the Royal Marines. His father John Stevens had been a commander in the Royal Navy. He was the youngest of three brothers (Thomas, Cornelius, John), all of whom were to serve as captains in the Royal Marines. His older brother Cornelius was killed in action during the Battle of Navarino.

== Biography ==
Stevens served during the Napoleonic Wars in the Caribbean during 1806–7, participated in the Walcheren Campaign, and in the Iberian peninsula during 1810–11. He commanded one of the two Rocket detachments, which accompanied two companies of artillery which supported the 1st and 2nd Battalions, Royal Marines to North America in 1813 to fight the War of 1812. As part of Sir George Cockburn's, he participated, in the Battle of Craney Island, and the attacks on Hampton, Virginia and Ocracoke Island.

The brigade of Royal Marine Artillery served in Canada during 1814, and he was mentioned in Lieutenant General Sir Gordon Drummond's despatches for his conduct during the Battle of Fort Oswego (1814). He was present at the Siege of Fort Erie, and was subsequently employed on improving the defences at Chippawa Creek, where an impending attack by numerically superior enemy forces was anticipated.

He was present during the Bombardment of Algiers in 1816. During the 1830s, he became the Superintendent of the Marine Artillery Laboratory, an institution which he encouraged to be established.

He died on 25 February 1866 and was buried at Highland Road Cemetery in Southsea, Hampshire.

== Promotions and awards ==
- Second Lieutenant, Royal Marines 28 September 1805.
- First Lieutenant, Royal Marines 2 September 1809.
- Captain, Royal Marines 14 April 1832.
- Major, Royal Marines 9 November 1846.
- Lieutenant Colonel, (Army List) 17 August 1848.
- Colonel, (Army List) 28 November 1854.
  - Major General, (Army List) 20 June 1855.
- 1848/1849 Naval General Service Medal (1847) with Clasp for "Algiers".
