= Stephen John (footballer) =

English footballer

Personal information
- Full name: Stephen Paul John
- Date of birth: 22 December 1966 (age 59)
- Place of birth: Brentwood, England
- Position: Defender

Senior career*
Years	Team	Apps	(Gls)
1985–1988	Leyton Orient	23	(0)
- * Club domestic league appearances and goals

Stephen Paul John (born 22 December 1966) is an English former professional footballer who played in the Football League as a defender.
