= Irving Peress =

American dentist and military officer

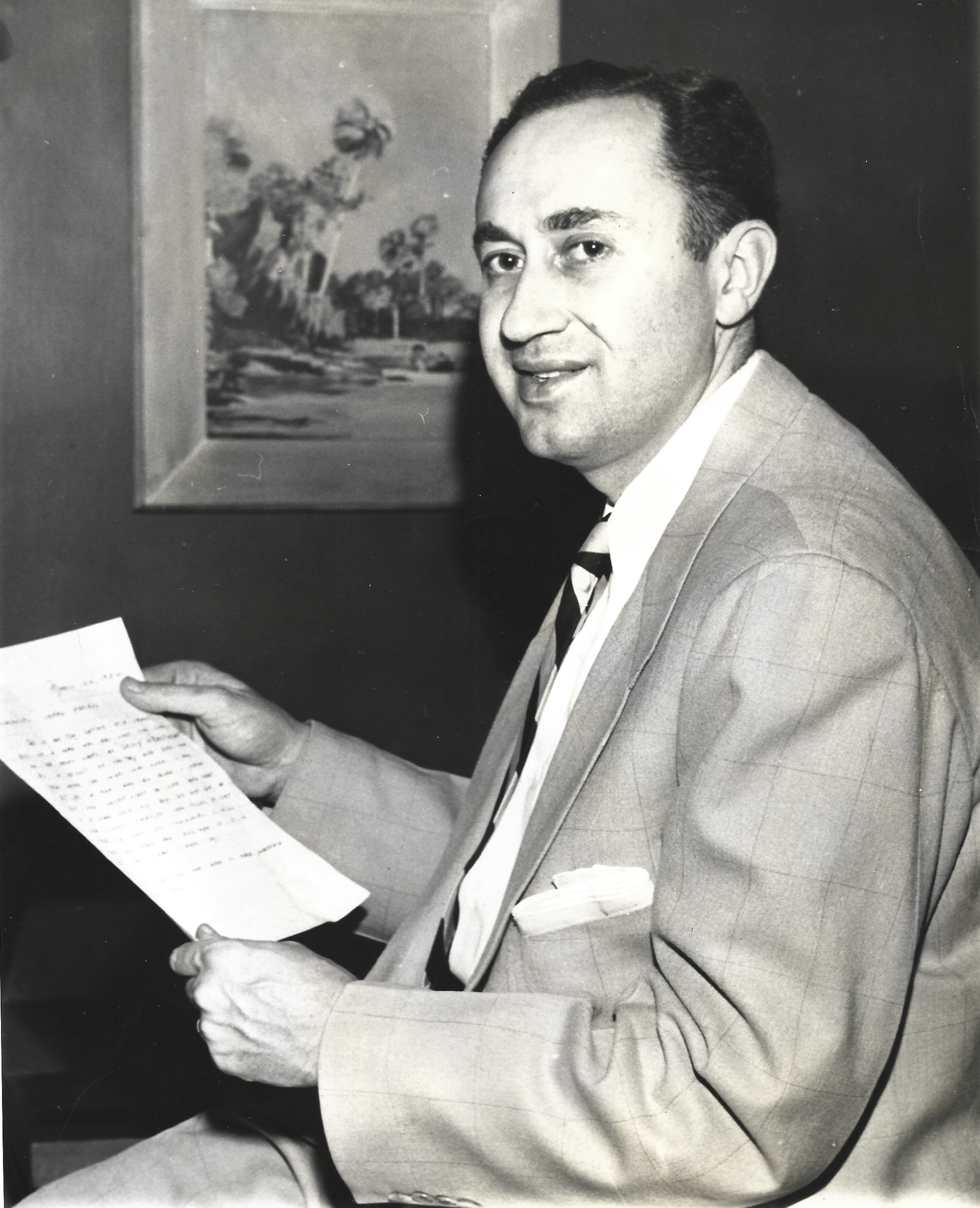
- Associated Press, April 7, 1954
- Born: July 31, 1917; Bronx, New York, U.S.
- Died: November 13, 2014 (aged 97); Queens, New York, U.S.
- Education: City College of New York; New York University College of Dentistry (DDS)
- Occupation: Dentist
- Years active: 1940–1980
- Known for: Target of Army–McCarthy hearings
- Spouse: Elaine Gittelson (m. 1942–2012, her death)
- Children: 3
- Military career
- Allegiance: United States
- Branch: United States Army
- Service years: 1952–1954
- Rank: Major
- Unit: U.S. Army Dental Command
- Conflicts: Korean War

Irving Peress (July 31, 1917 – November 13, 2014) was an American dentist and military officer who became a primary target for investigation of alleged communist leanings during the 1954 Army–McCarthy hearings.

== Early life ==
Peress was born to a Jewish family in the Bronx on July 31, 1917. The son of Sarah Peress and tailor Jacob Peress, he was raised in Manhattan and attended George Washington High School. From 1933 to 1936, Peress was a student at City College of New York, where he was a member of the Reserve Officers' Training Corps. He graduated from the New York University College of Dentistry in 1940 and established a practice in New York City. He became involved in politics after marrying Elaine Gittelson, an English teacher who became a therapist and psychiatric social worker. In the 1940s, he indicated the American Labor Party (ALP) as the party choice on his voter registration form. (New York voter registration and elections include party enrollment and closed primaries.) As a liberal third party, the ALP was a frequent target of anti-Communists who viewed it as a Communist front.

== Military service ==
Peress applied for a commission as an Army dentist during World War II, but failed his physical because of a hernia and did not serve.

Peress was maintaining a thriving practice by the early 1950s when doctors and dentists were being drafted for the Korean War. He gained weight in an effort to aggravate his high blood pressure, fail his physical, and avoid induction into the military. After passing the physical, he applied for and received a commission as a captain in the Army Dental Corps. He was inducted into the Army Reserve on October 5, 1952, and reported for active duty on January 3, 1953.

Originally slated for assignment to Japan, Peress asked for and received a compassionate reassignment based on his wife's and daughter's illnesses. He was reassigned to Camp Kilmer, New Jersey.

As part of his application for his commission, Peress signed an oath indicating that he had never been a member of an organization that sought to overthrow the U.S. government by unconstitutional means. When he later completed a more detailed questionnaire, Peress responded to queries about membership in the Communist party or affiliated organizations with the phrase "federal constitutional privilege", an allusion to the Fifth Amendment. The chief dental surgeon at Camp Kilmer later testified that Peress had no access to sensitive information there and that he and his assistant had, at the request of the camp's intelligence officer, monitored Peress' activities without discovering anything at all suspicious. Although this monitoring failed to uncover any wrongdoing by Peress, he still received fitness reports that called him a "very disloyal and untrustworthy type of officer" and stated that he was devoting himself to "the seeding of dissatisfaction".

== Target of McCarthy ==
In October 1953, Peress was promoted to major, even though his commanding officer had recommended that Peress be separated from the military because of suspicions stemming from his questionnaire answers. The Army later described it as a "readjustment in rank" made to comply with the Doctors' Draft Act, a recent law that required that the rank of military medical professionals reflect their level of experience.

Soon after Peress was promoted, the Senate Government Operations Committee received an anonymous complaint stating that Peress had been promoted even though he was under surveillance for communist activities. As a result of the complaint and subsequent inquiries, Army leaders decided in January 1954 that an honorable discharge was the quickest way to remove Peress from the military and resolve the issue.

Senator Joseph McCarthy, Chairman of the Government Operations Committee and its Permanent Subcommittee on Investigations, decided to hold hearings on Peress' promotion and pending discharge to illustrate McCarthy's claim that the Army was "soft on communism" because it tolerated an inefficient bureaucracy that failed to maintain security standards.

Peress appeared before McCarthy's Permanent Subcommittee on Investigations on January 30, 1954, and invoked the Fifth Amendment dozens of times in his testimony. He said he had and would continue to oppose any group that sought a violent or unconstitutional overthrow of the U.S. government. McCarthy called Peress "the key to the deliberate Communist infiltration of our Armed Forces" and a "Fifth Amendment Communist." Peress upbraided his questioners by saying that anyone, even a senator, who equated the invoking of the Fifth Amendment with guilt was himself guilty of subversion.

McCarthy wrote a letter to Secretary of the Army Robert T. Stevens calling for Peress to be court-martialed. He called for an investigation into the Army's handling of Peress' commissioning and promotion. Stevens believed that Peress' refusals to answer the committee's questions did not provide grounds for court-martial and approved Peress' discharge on February 2.

On February 18, 1954, Brigadier General Ralph W. Zwicker, who had been in command at Camp Kilmer, was recalled from Japan to testify, and refused to say who had authorized Peress' promotion to Major or honorable discharge. McCarthy told Zwicker he was "not fit to wear that uniform."

An FBI witness named Ruth Eagle, an undercover member of the New York City Police Department, testified on February 18, 1954, that Peress and his wife had been involved with the Communist party in the 1930s and 1940s and that Peress had been a leader of the American Labor Party.

McCarthy said that Peress' promotion had been ordered by a "silent master who decreed special treatment for Communists". During confrontational testimony interrupted by several shouting matches with McCarthy, Secretary of the Army Robert T. Stevens told the committee on March 24, 1955, that "some very bad mistakes" had allowed Peress' promotion.

The Army granted Peress an honorable discharge on March 31, 1954. In June 1954, the Army delivered the Subcommittee on Investigations a report on the Peress case that detailed those responsible for approving his promotion and discharge. It admitted to procedural "blunders" that had resulted in the rewriting of regulations to avoid similar cases and said those responsible had been disciplined.

McCarthy, defending his pursuit of the Peress case when faced with censure, told a Senate committee that his own investigation contradicted Army witnesses and showed that Peress had been considered for "sensitive work" in May 1953.

McCarthy's confrontational approach, coupled with his pressure on the Army for preferential treatment of committee staff member G. David Schine, was looked on in retrospect as the beginning of McCarthy's downfall, leading to the Senate's censure of McCarthy.

== Later events ==
Following the hearings, Peress reported receiving anti-Semitic hate mail and the Peress home in Queens was stoned in late February 1954. He commented:

This comes from the self-styled 100 per cent loyal American, the super patriots, who, in the true tradition of the Storm Troopers of Hitler, crowned their efforts Saturday night with rocks thrown through the windows of my children's bedroom. This is the terror that stems from McCarthyism.

Peress was persuaded to remove his name from the door of his dental practice. His wife was pressured to resign as editor of the Parent-Teachers Association monthly bulletin at their local public school.

In 1976, he reflected on his experience:

I was really not such an important cog in anyone's wheel; I was something that got caught in the wheel.... Most people who come into my practice honestly never heard of the whole incident. It amazes me that people are so naive politically. Even when I meet dentists at meetings, there is hardly a recognition.

In an interview in 2005, he repeatedly declined to say whether he had ever been a member of the Communist Party. Asked if he agreed with Communism, he replied:

I'm far from a Marxist scholar, but from my skimming of Marx, it was always reasonable, appropriate: democratic control by people of their own destinies and in control of the means of production. It's so utopian and mythological it's hard to conceive. Who would be against it? And what the Soviet Union was on its way to was enough to convince me.

He said that if he had explained his political beliefs at the Army–McCarthy hearings:

The next thing is, 'Name names'. That's the follow-up question. I have a constitutional right not to tell you. Even Oliver North took the Fifth Amendment. The common knowledge according to all of us who were involved was, if you answer one question, you give up your constitutional privileges.... It's an inappropriate question. I was a leader of the American Labor Party. We were red-baited. We're far freer than a lot of places, but speech is punishable. I would not face a committee today, there is not that jeopardy, but I have descendants. As long as there is a penalty, to take a principled position to protect the right of people to have their opinion not exposed, you do not expose your own.

== Retirement and death ==
Peress maintained his dental practice until 1980 and retired in 1982. He was still residing in the New York City area when he gave an interview to the New York Times in 2005.

Peress died at his home in Queens on November 13, 2014. According to one of his sons, Peress had suffered complications and declining health after breaking a leg in a fall, but was determined to live long enough to watch Major League Baseball's 2014 World Series. Peress' son stated that afterwards, Peress intentionally stopped taking his thyroid medication.
