= Jack Stephens (cricketer) =

Australian cricketer

Personal information
- Born: 31 August 1913; Majorca, Victoria, Australia
- Died: 2 September 1967 (aged 54); Daylesford, Victoria, Australia

Domestic team information
- Years: Team
- 1932-1938: Victoria
- Source: Cricinfo, 22 November 2015

Jack Stephens (31 August 1913 – 2 September 1967) was an Australian cricketer. He played three first-class cricket matches for Victoria between 1932 and 1938.

== See also ==
- List of Victoria first-class cricketers
