= John Sanborn Stevens =

American lawyer

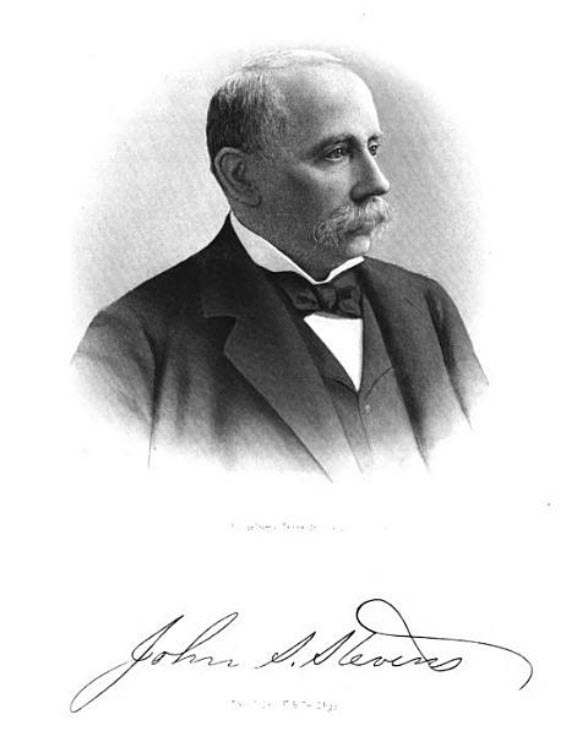
- Born: September 16, 1838; Bath, New Hampshire
- Died: March 4, 1912 (aged 73)
- Spouse: Sarah M. Bartlett (m. 1868)
- Parent(s): Joshua and Abigail (Walker) Stevens

John Sanborn Stevens (September 16, 1838 – March 4, 1912) was an Illinois lawyer.

== Biography ==
John S. Stevens was born in Bath, New Hampshire on September 16, 1838, the son of Joshua and Abigail (Walker) Stevens. He and his family moved to Hardwick, Vermont in 1849. He enrolled in Dartmouth College in 1858 and graduated in 1862.

After college, Stevens moved to Peoria, Illinois, where he worked as a schoolteacher for two years. He then read law with lawyer Alexander McCoy. He was admitted to the bar of Illinois in June 1865. Stevens and McCoy formed a partnership, McCoy & Stevens, which lasted until 1870 when McCoy moved to Chicago. Stevens then formed a partnership with David McCulloch, which lasted until 1876 when Stevens became postmaster of Peoria, a post he held until February 1880. In 1877, Stevens formed a law partnership with John S. Lee. Walter S. Horton later joined the firm, which became known as Stevens, Lee & Horton. After the death of Lee, William T. Abbott joined the firm, which was renamed Stevens, Horton & Abbott.

In June 1868, Stevens married Sarah M. Bartlett.

Stevens was active in the Illinois State Bar Association, serving as its president 1901–1902.
