= WestPoint Home =

U.S. supplier of fashion and textile products

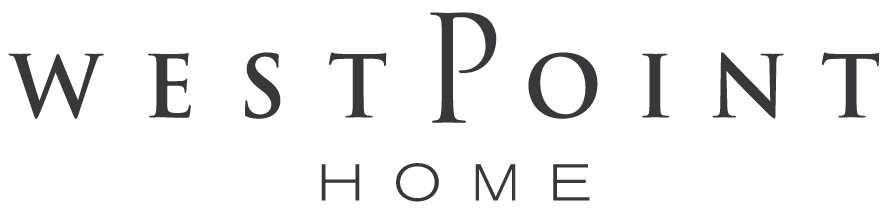
- Formerly: WestPoint Manufacturing Company
- Type: Private
- Industry: bedding, bath
- Founded: 1880
- Headquarters: New York, NY,
- Products: bed sheets, blankets, pillows, organic cotton, bath towels, beach towels, egyptian cotton, comforters, mattress pads
- Parent: Icahn Enterprises
- Website: https://www.westpointhome.com

WestPoint Home, Inc., is a supplier of fashion and core home textile products. WestPoint Home is headquartered in New York City with manufacturing and distribution facilities in the United States and overseas. Their products include a diverse range of home fashion textile products including: towels, fashion bedding, sheets, comforters, blankets, mattress pads, pillows and more. Some brands that they offer include: Martex, Izod, Ralph Lauren, Hanes, Stay Bright, Vellux, Patrician, Lady Pepperell, and Utica Cotton Mills. Products from Westpoint Home are found in retail stores throughout the United States.

WestPoint Home, Inc. as it is known today is the result of the mergers of three of the oldest companies in the textile industry: J.P. Stevens & Co., Inc. (est. 1813 in Massachusetts incorporated 1899), Pepperell Manufacturing Company (est. 1851 in Maine), and West Point Manufacturing Company (est. 1880 in Georgia).

The company was led by the Lanier family through the late 1980s. The Laniers originally incorporated the Westpoint Manufacturing Company in 1880. WestPoint Home, Inc. is now owned by Icahn Enterprises, L.P.

== Brands ==
- Five Star Hotel
- Izod
  - Martex Luxury
  - Martex Bare Necessities
  - Martex Purity
  - Martex Atelier
- Lady Pepperell
- Luxor
- Patrician
- Seduction
- Southern Tide
- Ultratouch

== History ==
WestPoint Home is a conglomerate of three textile giants. WestPoint Manufacturing Company was formed in the south shortly after the end of the Civil War. J.P. Stevens & Co. and the Pepperell Manufacturing Co were two individual companies that were founded some years earlier in New England. WestPoint Home currently serves as a manufacturer of home fashion textiles.

J.P. Stevens & Co had a dispute with the Amalgamated Clothing and Textile Workers Union, a textile labor union that was founded in 1914. Crystal Lee Sutton, a mill worker at a J.P. Stevens mill in Roanoke Rapids, NC, was fired after trying to unionize employees. Sutton's firing galvanized employees, and the Amalgamated Clothing and Textile Workers Union (ACTWU) began to represent workers at the plant on August 28, 1974. The company refused to bargain with the union and, according to historian Jefferson Cowie, "embarked on a notorious war of attrition in the courts." The union won repeated court victories, but was drained of resources. A U.S. Court of Appeals found the company campaign against the union "had involved numerous unfair labor practices, including coercive interrogation, surveillance, threat of plant closing and economic reprisals for union activity."
