= John Shorter Stevens =

American politician and lawyer (1933–2019)

John Shorter Stevens (May 30, 1933 – April 23, 2019) was an American politician and lawyer from North Carolina.

Stevens was born in Asheville, North Carolina, on May 30, 1933. He attended Christ School and the University of North Carolina at Chapel Hill, as well as its law school. After two years of military service with the United States Army Corps of Engineers, Stevens began practicing law in 1961, and later cofounded the firm Roberts & Stevens via merger. Stevens was a member of the Democratic Party and elected to four terms within the North Carolina House of Representatives, serving between 1969 and 1975. In June 2013, Stevens was elected into the North Carolina Bar Association's General Practice Hall of Fame. He retired as a lawyer in January 2019. Stevens was also a historian and wrote a book: A Short Buncombe County History, that was published in the spring of 2019. Stevens died of cancer at home in Asheville on April 23, 2019, aged 85.
