= Worldpay =

Worldpay is the name of two related companies:

- Worldpay Group, a former UK company, which was acquired by Vantiv to form the American company Worldpay, Inc.
- Worldpay, Inc., an American multinational financial technology company and payment processing company.
