= Certegy =

Certegy, Inc.
- Type: Public, 2001–2006; Subsidiary, 2006 – 2018; Private company, 2018–present
- Industry: Financial Sector
- Founded: 2001
- Headquarters: Clearwater, Florida
- Products: ACH Payments, check verification, Buy Now, Pay Later
- Website: www.certegy.com, www.askcertegy.com

Certegy was a public corporation created in 2001 when Equifax spun off their payment services division. The corporation had two divisions of its own: check verification and credit cards. In September 2005, a merger with Fidelity Information Services, a subsidiary of Fidelity National Financial, was announced. The merger was completed in 2006. Although designed to be the surviving entity of the merger, Certegy's corporate name was changed as part of the merger agreement to Fidelity National Information Services, and the ticker symbol on the NYSE changed from CEY to FIS. Executive offices were relocated to Jacksonville, Florida, although manufacturing and operations remained in St. Petersburg, Florida.

In 2004, Certegy acquired Game Financial, a cash access provider operating in several casinos in the United States, including rights to their trade name, GameCash. In 2007, it was announced that Certegy Gaming (formed after the acquisition of Game Financial) would be sold to Global Cash Access for $25 million.

Since the merger with Fidelity Information Services, the division of Certegy was responsible for merchant check guarantee has been renamed as FIS.

FIS sold Certegy to Variant Equity Advisors in September 2018.

== Consumer information compromised ==
On July 3, 2007, Certegy announced via press release that their security had been compromised by one of their own employees. Nearly three million names had been stolen and sold to marketing companies who then contacted various consumers with "offers to sell stuff".

From a phone call to their call center (800-437-5120) on July 28, 2007, a Certegy representative stated that the information that was sold was limited to: name, address, phone number, and last four digits of the account in question. If the account was a checking account and only if the account holder's birth date was printed on the checks, then that birth date was also included in the sold information. Copies of letters sent to customers whose information was compromised stated FULL Social Security numbers, birth dates, checking account numbers were shared along with driver license account information.

Certegy has filed a civil complaint in St. Petersburg, Florida, against the former employee (William Sullivan, Tampa, Florida) and the marketing companies believed to have received the misappropriated data, seeking retrieval of all consumer information as well as an injunction against any use.

According to the suit, Sullivan, either on his own or through S&S Computer Services, sold the consumer information to JAM Marketing, a Seminole-based data broker. JAM admitted to Certegy that it paid Sullivan and/or S&S "substantial consideration" in exchange for the information, the suit says.

JAM in turn provided some of the information to three other marketing firms - Strategia Marketing in Largo, Data Secure IP LLC in Tampa and Whitehat.com Inc. in Tempe, Ariz., the suit says. Whitehat gave some of the information to two other companies, MCList Escrow Inc. in Seminole and Custom Response Teleservices in Elkhorn, Neb., and MCList provided some of the information to Quality Resources Inc. in Clearwater.

In late July 2007, Certegy announced that the number of records compromised was greater than originally stated. 8.5 million consumer records from the check authorizing company, more than three times the original estimate, was stated.

In November 2007, Sullivan pleaded guilty to conspiracy and fraud charges. In July 2008, he was sentenced to 57 months in prison and ordered to pay $3.2 million in restitution, which is about 38 cents per record stolen.

On May 3, 2008, Notices from the Administrator for the US District Court, PO Box 3689, Portland, OR 97208 were sent out on a class action lawsuit to Certegy victims stating a reimbursement for identity theft up to $20,000 and would pay for "certain out of pocket expenses". The website www.dataSettlement.com online forms mention reimbursement for printing of check for new accounts ($40) and two years of credit monitoring services ($180). Phone calls can also be placed at 1-877-580-9770 about the class action lawsuit.
