= Bibit =

Bibit may refer to:

- a Netherlands-based payment processor, now owned by Worldpay Group
- a Coahuiltecan tribe of Native Americans
