= Ron Kalifa =

British entrepreneur (born 1961)

Sir Rohinton Minoo "Ron" Kalifa OBE (born April 1961) is a Parsi British entrepreneur. In May 2019, Ron was appointed as a non-executive director to the Bank of England's Court of Directors and later became Senior Independent Director.

He has held various roles including as the chairman of Network International, and formerly served as the chief executive officer of Worldpay Group from 2002 to 2013, continuing as vice chairman. Kalifa was appointed an Officer of the Order of the British Empire in the 2018 New Year Honours for his work in financial services and technology. He was later knighted in the 2022 Queen's Birthday Honours.

== Career ==
Before becoming CEO and then later Vice Chairman and Board Director of Worldpay, Kalifa held various roles within Royal Bank of Scotland Group (RBS) where he built the Worldpay business organically and via acquisition. During his tenure as CEO, he led Worldpay through its transition to a standalone company following its divestment from RBS in 2010 and oversaw the company's takeover by Vantiv in 2017 and subsequently to FIS in 2019.

As a public speaker and prominent figure in the payments sector, he has been a keynote speaker at the Innovate Finance Global Summit over the years and at various Money 2020 conferences. He was also Chairman of FutureLearn, the educational technology platform, from February 2020 to December 2022.

He has held the position of chairman at Network International, a payments group in Africa and the Middle East, joining just ahead of its IPO in 2019. This business was divested to the global investment firm, Brookfield in June 2023. In October 2023, Brookfield appointed Kalifa as Vice Chair and Head of Financial Infrastructure.

Mark Carney, as Chairman of Brookfield said: “Ron and I have known each other for many years including during our time together at the Bank of England. I look forward to working with Ron as we grow Brookfield’s financial infrastructure capabilities.”

Kalifa was also made a non-executive director on the InterContinental Hotels Group (IHG) board in January 2024. Since January 2026, he is the non-executive chairman of the Norwegian software company, Visma.

He is reported to be an investor in the Indian Premier League (IPL) cricket franchise, Rajasthan Royals.

== Other activity ==
Kalifa sits on various not-for-profit boards. Prior to becoming a Trustee of the Royal Foundation (TRF) and Chair of the Finance Committee, he was a Non-Executive Director for Transport for London, where he chaired the Finance Committee until May 2021.

An alumnus of Harvard Business School, Kalifa also joined the Council of Imperial College London in March 2020. In July 2020, Kalifa was appointed by the UK government to lead an independent Fintech Strategic Review.

The outcome of the review entitled "Kalifa Review of UK Fintech" was published on 26 February 2021, his report highlighted the opportunity to create highly skilled jobs across the UK, boost trade, and extend the UK's competitive edge over other leading fintech hubs. It sets out a series of proposals for how the UK can build on its existing strengths, create the right framework for continued innovation, and support UK firms to scale.

In January 2021, he became a member of the Government's Build Back Better Council, consisting of 30 members representing industries from retail and hospitality, to finance, science and technology.

In November 2021, he was favored for a job as the Chairman of the England and Wales Cricket Board.

== The Kalifa Review ==
During Budget 2020, The Chancellor of the Exchequer asked Ron Kalifa OBE to conduct an independent review to identify priority areas to support the UK’s fintech sector. The Review subsequently launched in July 2020.

The outcome of the Fintech Strategic Review entitled "Kalifa Review of UK Fintech" was published on 26 February 2021. His report highlighted the opportunity to create highly skilled jobs across the UK, boost trade, and extend the UK's competitive edge over other leading fintech hubs. It sets out a series of proposals for how the UK can build on its existing strengths, create the right framework for continued innovation, and support UK firms to scale.

The report’s recommendations included amendments to UK listing rules to make the UK a more attractive location for Initial Public Offerings, which were subsequently adopted in December 2021. It also recommended improvements to tech visas to attract global talent and boost the fintech workforce and the creation of a regulatory Fintech ‘scalebox’ to provide additional support to growth stage fintechs. The final recommendation was the creation of a Centre for Finance, Innovation, and Technology (CFIT), to strengthen national coordination across the fintech ecosystem to boost growth. The CFIT had a soft launch in early 2022.

Presenting the report to Parliament in April 2021, Rishi Sunak, then Chancellor of the Exchequer, concluded his speech by thanking Ron Kalifa and his team for their exceptional work in producing this “seminal review”.

== Honours and awards ==
Ron Kalifa ranked 3rd on the Financial Times EMPower top 100 Ethnic Minority Leaders list. In 2019, he was given the Freedom of the City of London.

He was appointed Officer of the Order of the British Empire (OBE) in the 2018 New Year Honours for services to financial services and technology. He was knighted in the 2022 Birthday Honours for services to financial services and technology and for public service.

In September 2022, Sir Ron was awarded an honorary doctorate in business administration from the University of East London's Royal Docks School of Business and Law.

Now a member of the Main Committee for the honours system, Kalifa is Chair of the Sport Committee.
