= CloudEndure =

American cloud computing company

CloudEndure, Inc.
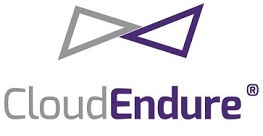
- Industry: Computer Software; Information Technology; Cloud Computing
- Founded: 2012
- Headquarters: New York, NY, United States; Ramat Gan, Israel
- Key people: Ofer Gadish (CEO); Gil Shai (CRO); Ofir Ehrlich (VP R&D); Leonid Feinberg (VP Product)
- Products: Disaster Recovery, Continuous Backup, and Live Migration for the Hybrid Cloud
- Website: www.cloudendure.com

CloudEndure is a cloud computing company that develops business continuity software for disaster recovery, continuous backup, and live migration. CloudEndure is headquartered in the United States with R&D in Israel.

== History ==
CloudEndure was founded in 2012 by Ofer Gadish (CEO), Gil Shai (CRO), Ofir Ehrlich (VP R&D), and Leonid Feinberg (VP Product). The same founders previously established AcceloWeb, which was acquired by Limelight Networks in 2011.

CloudEndure has raised a total of $18.2 million from private investors and companies such as Dell EMC, VMware, Mitsui, Infosys, and Magma Venture Partners.

Awards for CloudEndure include the 2017 CRN Emerging Vendors Award for Storage Startups and the 2016 Gartner Cool Vendor Award.

CloudEndure products have been integrated as OEM software for several partner company services, including an integration into Google Cloud VM Migration Service and integrations with Cisco Systems CloudCenter Disaster Recovery and Migration and Sungard Availability Services Cloud Recovery.

Amazon made an offer to purchase CloudEndure in January 2019. Between $200 and $250 million was the negotiated price. They outbid Google and acquired the company on January 10, 2019.

== Products ==
CloudEndure Disaster Recovery performs continuous block-level replication and saves a dormant copy in the target infrastructure, which uses a smaller percentage of compute, storage, and memory than the primary site; this leads to minimal RTOs (recovery time objective) and RPOs (recovery point objective) when spun up in a disaster.

The company offers two tiers of Disaster Recovery, as well as Continuous Backup and Live Migration products.

CloudEndure's Software as a Service (SaaS) are application-agnostic and can replicate workloads from physical, virtual, and cloud-based infrastructure to a variety of target sites, including Amazon Web Services (AWS), Google Cloud Platform (GCP), Microsoft Azure, and VMware.

== Patents and licensing ==
CloudEndure Ltd. holds (or has pending) seven US patents including:

- "20140279915A1". – System and method for maintaining a copy of a cloud-based computing environment and restoration.
- "20150249708A1". – System and method for asynchronous replication of a storage in a computing environment.
- "20150256510A1". – System and method for name resolution of replicated components in computing environments.
- "20170093971A1". – System and method for orchestrating replicated components in a replicated cloud-based computing environment.
- "20170192859A1". – System and method for restoring original machines from replicated machines in a secondary computing environment.
- "20170111449A1". – Synchronization of an order of access instructions from a primary computing environment to a replicated computing environment.
- "20180181310A1". – System and method for disk identification in a cloud-based computing environment.

== See also ==
- Disaster recovery
- Disaster recovery plan (DRP)
- Business continuity
- Recovery time objective (RTO)
- Recovery point objective (RPO)
- Continuous data protection
