= Conex =

Conex may refer to:

- Conex box, an intermodal container for shipping and storage
- Connectivity exchange, the exchange of information concerning routes to radio stations
- Conex, a trade name for meta-aramid fiber
- Conex Sat Ltd, a cable television company in Romania
- The Conex, a play featuring actor Kahlil Joseph

== See also ==
- Connex (disambiguation)
