= Network International =

Payment service provider

- Type: Formerly Public
- Traded as: Formerly LSE: NETW
- Industry: Payment service provider
- Founded: 1994; 32 years ago
- Headquarters: Dubai, United Arab Emirates
- Key people: Ron Kalifa (Non-Executive Chairman); Murat Cagri Suzer (Chief Executive Officer)
- Services: Payments as a service
- Revenue: ▲$490.1 million (2023)
- Operating income: ▲$111.4 million (2023)
- Net income: ▼$66.5 million (2023)
- Owner: Brookfield Asset Management
- Subsidiaries: Payfast
- Website: www.network.ae

Network International (NI) is United Arab Emirates payment service provider headquartered in Dubai and operating primarily across the Middle East and Africa. Established in 1994 as a subsidiary of Emirates Bank, the company became one of the region's largest digital payments providers.

In September 2024, after being listed on the London Stock Exchange, it was acquired by Brookfield Asset Management. The following year, NI merged its operations with a competing provider, Magnati, creating a new entity, Network International LLC, controlled by a consortium led by Brookfield.

== History ==
The company was founded in the United Arab Emirates as a payments subsidiary of Emirates Bank in 1994. Mainly operating in the Middle East and Africa region it became the first independent vendor in the Middle East to be certified by Mastercard and Visa for payments, and a member of the JCB and UnionPay card schemes. The Abraaj Group bought a 49 per cent stake in the business in 2011.

In January 2017, Simon Haslam, CEO of US payments processor Elavon replaced Bhairav Trivedi as CEO. Nandan Mer, Mastercard Strategy Head for International Markets, took over Simon upon the latter's retirement in 2021.

The Abraaj Group sold its stake to a joint venture between Warburg Pincus and General Atlantic in 2015. In a deal worth $340 million, Network acquired Emerging Markets Payments (EMP) from Actis in March 2016, creating the largest payments processor in the MENA region, estimated as five times larger than CSC in Lebanon by Bhairav Trivedi, the CEO of Network at the time. It remains the largest payments processor in the region.

In March 2019, Network announced its intention to float on the London Stock Exchange's main market, as well as the appointment of Ron Kalifa OBE, British payments rival Worldpay's former CEO, as chairman.

The company was the subject of an initial public offering in April 2019. It was the largest float of that year until that point, listing with a valuation of £2.2 billion in the premium listing segment of the Official List of the Financial Conduct Authority and trading on the Main Market of the London Stock Exchange. It also joined the FTSE 250 index of companies. Network International sold 40% of its shares at the IPO. In addition to this, Mastercard bought a cornerstone investment of $300 million, though the deal subject to a 9.99% limit, which it stated it would invest in shared projects with Network in the MENA region as part of the deal. Mastercard is now the fourth largest shareholder in Network International after General Atlantic, Warburg Pincus and Emirates NBD. While there were some concerns regarding Brexit's impact on market conditions Kalifa commented that the London IPO would not be troubled by Brexit, as Network's business is not reliant on the UK-EU relationship.

In September 2021, Network announced the completion of its acquisition of DPO Group for $291.3 million. DPO is the largest online payments platform operating across Africa.

Brookfield Asset Management made an offer to acquire the company for £2.2 billion ($2.76 billion) in June 2023. The High Court approved the transaction on 13 September 2024, allowing it to complete.

In October 2025, it was announced that the firm had completed the merger of its operations with payment services provider Magnati, creating a new entity called Network International LLC. The new company is controlled by a consortium led by Brookfield.
