= Dennis J. Kuester =

American businessman

Dennis J. Kuester is an American businessman. He served as chairman and chief executive officer of Marshall & Ilsley from 1993 to 2010.

== Biography ==
=== Early life ===
He graduated from the University of Wisconsin–Milwaukee with a degree in Accounting and Finance in 1966.

=== Career ===
He joined Marshall & Ilsley in 1976. From 1987 to 1993, he served as its president, and as its chairman and CEO from 1993 to 2010. In 2006, he earned US$5.21 million, and from 2001 to 2006, US$24.79 million. He retired in October 2010

He has served on the boards of directors of the Federal Reserve Bank of Chicago, IBM, Krueger International, Metavante, Modine Manufacturing, Super Steel Products and the Wausau Paper Corporation.

=== Philanthropy ===
He has served on the boards of trustees of the National Multiple Sclerosis Society, the Pabst Theater, the United Way, YMCA of Wisconsin and the Christian Stewardship Foundation.

A Republican, he has supported George W. Bush, John McCain and Paul Ryan. He is the chairman of the board of directors of the Bradley Foundation.
