= Moneris =

Canadian payment processor

- Formerly: Moneris Solutions
- Company type: Joint venture
- Industry: Payment processing
- Founded: December 2000; 25 years ago
- Headquarters: Etobicoke, Ontario, Canada
- Area served: Canada
- Key people: James Hicks (president & CEO)
- Products: Point of sale terminals and auxiliary equipment
- Owner: Royal Bank of Canada; Bank of Montreal
- Number of employees: 1,900
- Website: moneris.com

Moneris (formerly "Moneris Solutions") is a Canadian financial technology company that specializes in payment processing.

Moneris was established in December 2000, as a joint venture between the Royal Bank of Canada and Bank of Montreal. The company is headquartered in the Toronto suburb of Etobicoke, Ontario and has offices in Sackville, New Brunswick, Burnaby, British Columbia, Montreal, Quebec, and Calgary, Alberta.

Moneris's U.S. operations (formerly known as Harris Bank Merchant Services/The Charge-It-System) were based in Schaumburg, Illinois, until being sold in November 2016 to Vantiv.

== History ==
Moneris was first established in December 2000 as a 50/50 joint venture between RBC and BMO. It became the first Canadian appropriator to offer both Visa and Mastercard merchant accounts in one single point of contact. Moneris was also the first Canadian payment processor to use an integrated point-of-sale system, so businesses could have the proceeds from all card transactions flow into a single deposit account. After its first 1.5 years, the company reported having processed more than 2 billion transactions in Canada.

In October 2003, Moneris acquired Ernex Marketing Technologies, an industry leader in providing privately branded loyalty programs and stored-value gift cards.

In February 2004, Moneris purchased the merchant portfolio of RBC Centura to become the payment provider for all existing and new merchant accounts tied to the bank. The acquisition supported the company's expansion into the United States with merchants located in North Carolina, South Carolina, Virginia, Georgia, and Florida.

On June 6, 2005, Moneris became the first payment processor in Canada to process an Interac Online transaction. This marked the first opportunity for Canadians to pay for goods and services purchased on the Internet directly from their bank account. Prior to Interac Online, the primary option for Canadians to pay for purchases online was through a credit card.

On June 27, 2005, Moneris processed the first full data EMV chip transaction in Canada with a VISA certified chip. This was the first card transaction in Canada that required inserting a card into a chip reader slot on the terminal, rather than use a swipe feature. On August 27, 2007, the company announced it was among the first acquirers in Canada to be certified by all of Interac, Mastercard and VISA to provide chip technology in Canada.

In April 2008, Moneris acquired Keycorp Canada, one of the largest providers of POS support services in Canada, to expand its portfolio of merchants.

In March 2013, Moneris processed the first Near Field Communication (NFC) mobile debit transaction in Canada. Using Interac Flash, Canadians could now make contactless debit transactions with their mobile device. The debut of NFC payment in Canada was performed in a McDonald's restaurant using a Blackberry smartphone.

In November 2014, Moneris became the first Canadian acquirer to offer a full processing solution for the UnionPay card portfolio.

In November 2016, US-based payment processor Vantiv announced that it had acquired Moneris USA for $425 million USD. Vantiv (now under Fidelity National Information Services Inc.) took over all Moneris USA operations including merchant accounts and other business relationships.

== Products ==
=== Devices ===
In June 2014, Moneris launched Payd Pro, a point of sale (POS) solution that can run on a smartphone. The device was promoted as Canada's first mobile POS solution to accept Interac debit and credit, as well as the first to include EMV chip and PIN and contactless payment technology. The device came in the form of a PIN pad, which connects to Moneris' Payd app using a Bluetooth connection. Payd Pro was targeted at small businesses to accept payments from anywhere.

In April 2019, Moneris introduced Moneris Core, a proprietary software used to power its next-generation payment terminals. With Moneris Core, Moneris became the first major payment provider in Canada to provide its own proprietary payment experience.

In September 2020, Moneris launched Moneris Go, using the A920 Android POS mobile terminal from PAX Technology. The mobile device accepts card and contactless payments and can integrate with third-party apps. The device was announced as the company's first smart terminal and suitable for businesses of all sizes.

Moneris is the only acquirer in Canada to offer a unified bilingual experience for English and French users across all of its point-of-sale terminals.

=== Services ===
In October 2018, Moneris launched its digital analytics tool Offlinx to measure the effect digital ad spending can have on in-store purchases for retail businesses. The company's data services has publicly shared findings to disclose Canadian consumer spending habits during the 2019 NBA Finals, the King Street Pilot Project, and holiday seasons.

== Business ==
=== Operations ===
Moneris processes more than 3 billion transactions a year for over 350,000 merchant locations and employs more than 1,900 people across North America. While based in Toronto, the company has offices in Sackville NB, Burnaby BC, Montreal QC, and Calgary AB.

=== Growth ===
In 2016, Moneris began a partnership with Planet Payment, a provider of international and multi-currency payment processing services.

In 2018, Moneris began a partnership with Kount, an online fraud protection platform.

In 2020, Moneris began a partnership with Bookmark, a Toronto-based website building startup, to provide web-building tools for small businesses.

Moneris is partnered with all major card brands in Canada, including Interac, Visa, Mastercard, American Express, Discover, and Union Pay. In 2015, Moneris announced support for Apple Pay in its contactless-capable terminals. In 2017, Moneris announced support for Google Pay.
