= Connex =

Connex may refer to:

== Public transport ==
- Veolia Transport, formerly Connex Group, now part of Transdev
  - Connex Bus UK, a defunct bus operating company in Greater London, England
  - Connex Melbourne, a former train operator in Australia
  - Connex South Central, a defunct train operating company in England
  - Connex South Eastern, a defunct train operating company in England
  - MyBus, formerly Connex Transport Jersey, a defunct bus company in Jersey
  - Transdev Germany, formerly Connex Germany, bus and train operator in Germany
  - Transdev Auckland, formerly Connex Auckland, passenger train service in Auckland, New Zealand

== Roads ==
- NorthConnex, a tolled motorway tunnel in Sydney, Australia
- WestConnex, a road network under construction in Sydney, Australia

== Other uses ==
- Connex relation, a type of binary relation
- FIS CONNEX, an electronic funds transfer application package from EFD (eFunds Corporation)
- a fictitious energy company in the 2005 American film Syriana
- Connex GSM Romania, a Romanian mobile phone network operator

== See also ==
- Conex (disambiguation)
- KNX (standard)
