= Check card =

Check card may refer to:

- Debit card, a payment card
- Cheque guarantee card
