= Jackson Stephens =

American businessman (born 1952)

Jackson Thomas "Steve" Stephens Jr (born July 24, 1952) is an American businessman and the founder, chairman, and CEO of Exoxemis, Inc., a biomedical research company. He is the former chairman of The Club for Growth and the chairman of The Club for Growth Foundation. Stephens also co-founded the Arkansas Policy Foundation. Stephens has recorded in Nashville studios and released several albums on which he wrote most of the music and lyrics while playing all the keyboards.

== Early life and education ==
Stephens was born on July 24, 1952, and received a bachelor's degree in business and economics from Hendrix College in Conway, Arkansas.

== Early career ==
From 1973 to 1983, Stephens worked in all aspects of his family's firm, Stephens Inc., in Little Rock. At that time, it was an investment/merchant bank, which took Walmart, J.B. Hunt, and others public while making investments for its own account. During his 10 years at Stephens, the firm became the largest investment bank off Wall Street in terms of capital and remained so until 1985.

== Biomedical research ==
In 1987, Stephens began a quest to explore and understand the role of oxygen in biological systems for use in diagnostics and therapeutics. To help direct that effort, Stephens hired Robert C. Allen. Allen had discovered cellular chemiluminescence. Allen's understanding of the quantum mechanics of the neutrophil, white blood cells, and the human immune system was the key to his invention of a chemiluminescence diagnostic system that provides comprehensive, point-of-care analysis of a patient's illness-disease profile. In developing this diagnostic system, Allen also discovered the role that myeloperoxidase plays in the human immune system and its natural ability to selectively bind and kill pathogens. Allen previously worked as a pathologist for Basil Pruitt, surgeon, known as one of the founding fathers of modern trauma and burn medicine.

Stephens founded Exoxemis in 1987 and since that time has collaborated with Allen on the development and commercialization of Zempia, the company's trade name for the first, topical antiseptic that works safely in blood. Stephens and Allen have co-authored a number of peer-reviewed journal articles on the microbicidal activity of myeloperoxidase (MPO), the active pharmaceutical ingredient in Zempia. In 2010, the American Society for Microbiology (ASM) published a paper in The Journal of Infection and Immunity titled “Myeloperoxidase Selectively Binds and Selectively Kills Microbes.” An initial patent (priority date February 1991) was issued on the Zempia technology in 1999.

== Government and politics ==
Stephens joined The Club for Growth board in 2003. Stephens was chairman of the club from 2010 to 2019. Stephens helped expand the club's focus from Republican House primaries into U.S. Senate races. In the 2004 Senate race, Pat Toomey challenged Senator Arlen Specter (Pennsylvania) who was supported by President George W. Bush and his cabinet and a cadre of professional politicians including Bush's senior adviser and deputy chief of staff, Karl Rove. Stephens was Toomey's principal supporter. Although Toomey lost the primary by less than 2 percent, the campaign effectively launched the Club into the center of key Senate races and established the club as a significant force in American politics. Toomey became the club's president, and in 2010 was elected senator (Pennsylvania).

Stephens was elected chairman of the club's Foundation in 2019.

=== Arkansas Policy Foundation ===
Stephens cofounded the Arkansas Policy Foundation in 1995. In 1996, Stephens helped recruit Madison Murphy who led the Murphy Commission (1996–1999).

Stephens chaired the Murphy Commission's statewide education work group. In 2001, Stephens helped establish the first open-enrollment public charter school in Arkansas: Academics Plus Charter Schools, Inc. Stephens later served on its board.

== Music ==
Stephens began playing an electric piano with his boyhood friend Jimmy Roberts in 1964. The duo formed a band and after several name changes decided on Rayburn. They played clubs, opened for Three Dog Night, and acted as Chuck Berry’s backing band when he played in town. In 1974, Jimmy Roberts died of spinal cancer, and Stephens put his musical interests aside. In 2009, Jimmy Roberts’ older brother suggested a reunion of living band members. Since 2010, Rayburn has released two albums, one of which was nominated in three Grammy categories.
