= ChexSystems =

Credit reporting agency

Chex Systems, Inc.
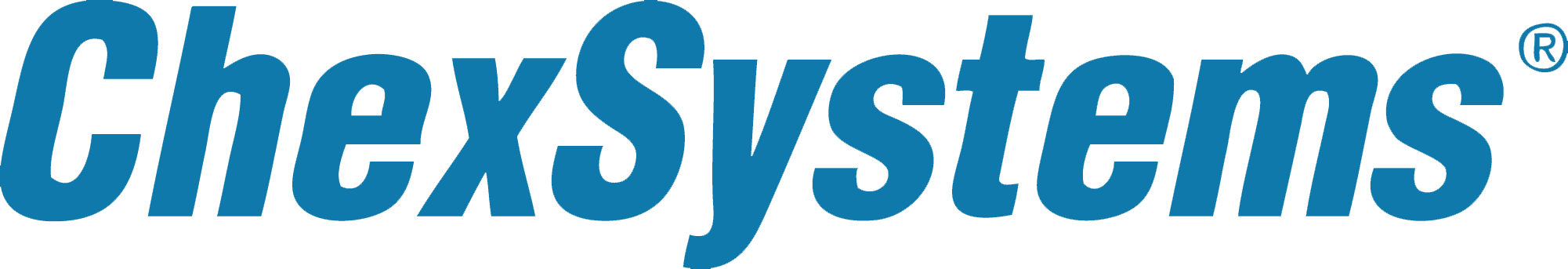
- Industry: Check and Customer Verification Systems
- Headquarters: Woodbury, Minnesota, United States
- Parent: FIS
- Website: chexsystems.com

ChexSystems is an American check verification service and consumer reporting agency owned by the eFunds subsidiary of Fidelity National Information Services. It provides information about the use of deposit accounts by consumers.

== History ==
In 1991, the agency was owned by Deluxe Corporation, and it was part of the spin-off from Deluxe that formed eFunds in 1999. Fidelity National Information Services acquired eFunds in 2007.

The number of "bank and thrift branches" served in 1991 was 59,000.

== Services ==
Eighty percent of commercial banks and credit unions in the United States use ChexSystems to screen applicants for checking and savings accounts. eFunds claims that their services are used in over 9,000 banks, including over 100,000 individual bank branches in the United States. As of 1991, ChexSystems held 7.3 million names of consumers whose bank accounts had been closed "for cause". Services include verification of identity, reports on account history, and transaction monitoring.

== Reporting ==
A ChexSystems report examines data submitted by banks in the past five years. A report may describe banking irregularities such as check overdrafts, unsettled balances, depositing fraudulent checks, or suspicious account handling. Banks may refuse to open a new deposit account for a consumer that has a negative item reported. In 1999, ChexSystems was classified as a consumer reporting agency governed by the Fair Credit Reporting Act. Therefore, consumers may retrieve a ChexSystems report annually, free of cost. They may dispute negative items and demand proof of the data contained in the report.

== Criticism ==
Credit bureaus report both negative and positive information about a consumer's use of credit; a ChexSystems report specifies only negative information, if any, about a consumer's use of deposit accounts. Thus, if two customers have both made the same banking errors in the past, while one of them has maintained a number of positive banking relationships as well, both customers might be declined when applying for a new account. A 1991 survey conducted by Consumer Action showed that two-thirds of California's largest financial institutions banned customers from opening accounts if they were listed with ChexSystems. The Greenlining Institute has published a report indicating wide disparities in the criteria banks have used when deciding whether to report negative items to ChexSystems.

=== Response from banks ===
Beginning in August 2000, the Greenlining Institute, a public policy center headquartered in San Francisco, and the Federal Reserve Bank of San Francisco held four meetings to discuss possible reform in the treatment of individuals reported to ChexSystems. These meetings included a discussion of potential best practices which a financial institution could implement to reduce its dependence on ChexSystems data in its decision process on opening accounts. Practices identified include:

- Training staff to use judgment to assess risk when opening accounts
- Setting minimum limits to activate the use of ChexSystems
- Considering the possible override of a customer denial for situations that are beyond the customer’s control, such as a prolonged illness

Since the meetings at the Federal Reserve Bank of San Francisco, all participating financial institutions have announced that they will implement positive changes in the way they use ChexSystems. In September 2000, Bank of America was the first financial institution to announce specific changes in its use of ChexSystems. Revised practices include:

- Disregarding all entries greater than three years old, provided the entry is not fraud-related
- Disregarding all entries greater than one year old if the consumer has repaid the debt
- Disregarding certain other entries if the consumer has repaid the debt and completes a course in financial responsibility
- Increasing the loss threshold for reporting closed accounts from $50 to $100 in overdrafts
- Increasing the length of time a customer has to repay the debt

During a December 2000 meeting, Bank of America reported that in the first two months under the revised standards, its new ChexSystems policies had resulted in approximately 1,800 "overrides". This allowed 1,800 individuals to open deposit accounts that would have been denied under the bank's former policies. Best practices to address the barriers ChexSystems reports may create for low-and moderate-income individuals include:

- Increasing the negative balance threshold for reporting customers from $25 to $100
- Increasing the length of time customers have to repay a negative balance from 30 days to 90 days
- Improving the overdraft notification process to include more visible language that explains how the institution uses ChexSystems and the consequences of being reported
- Refraining from reporting customers until numerous attempts have been made to contact them and providing ample opportunity to settle their accounts before a report is submitted to ChexSystems

Some banks that use ChexSystems also utilize the services of Early Warning Services, LLC, a fraud prevention and consumer reporting agency owned by Bank of America, Truist, JPMorgan Chase and Wells Fargo. Early Warning Services, LLC's website states, "Early Warning Services, LLC, is a fintech company owned by seven of the country’s largest banks."
