= Stephens Inc. =

American private equity firm

Stephens

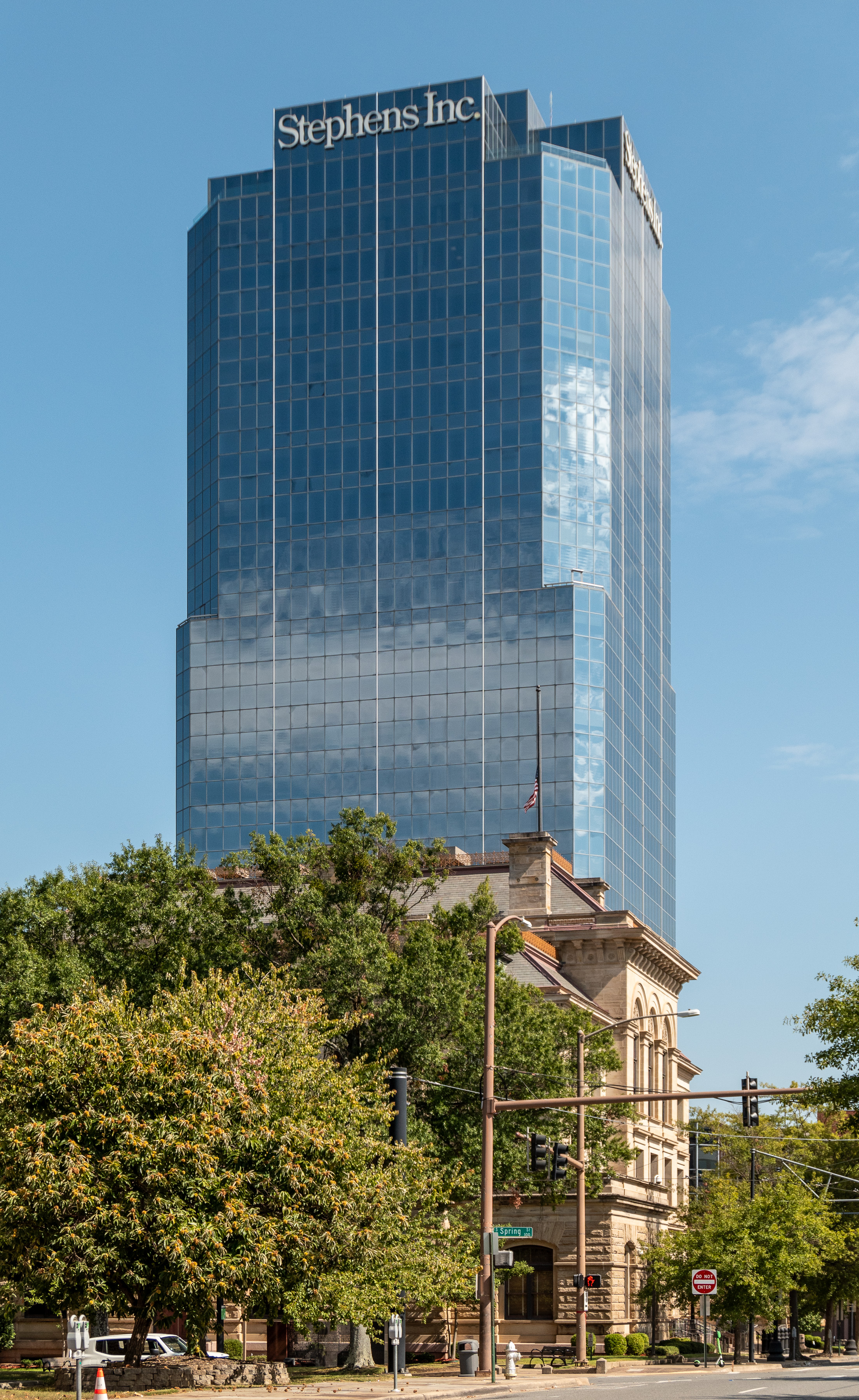
- Stephens Inc. headquarters in Little Rock, Arkansas
- Type: Private company
- Industry: Investment banking
- Founded: 1933
- Founders: W.R. Stephens; Jackson T. Stephens
- Headquarters: 111 Center Street; Little Rock, Arkansas, U.S.
- Number of employees: 1200+
- Website: www.Stephens.com

Stephens Inc. is an American privately held, independent financial services firm headquartered in Little Rock, Arkansas. As one of the largest privately owned investment banks in the United States, Stephens has 28 offices worldwide and employs more than 1,200 people. United States Ambassador to the United Kingdom Warren Stephens is the former chairman, president and chief executive officer of Stephens Inc..

== Founding and early history ==
In 1933, Witt Stephens founded W.R. Stephens Investments to trade Arkansas Highway bonds, which at the time were selling for as low as pennies on the dollar. By the time the bonds paid off at par in the early 1940s, Stephens had gained a reputation for municipal bond expertise and providing sound financial counseling. In 1946, upon graduation from the U.S. Naval Academy, Jackson T. "Jack" Stephens joined his brother, and, with a handshake, the two brothers formed Stephens, Inc., and a partnership that lasted more than 45 years.

The two brothers quickly began a series of acquisitions that would become a catalyst for the firm's growth and future. In 1945, Stephens purchased Arkansas Oklahoma Gas Company in Fort Smith, Arkansas, and in 1953, acquired what is now Stephens Production, an independent oil and gas exploration company. In 1954, they purchased a controlling interest in the Arkansas Louisiana Gas Company.

In 1948, Stephens sold Sheridan Telephone Exchange to Allied Telephone Company, which later became Alltel, beginning a decades-long relationship that in part continues today.

In 1956, Jack Stephens was named president and CEO of Stephens Inc. and Witt left the firm to become president and chairman of Arkansas Louisiana Gas Company, while both retained their 50-50 share of Stephens Inc. Witt returned to Stephens in the early 1970s.

Jack began to grow Stephens by providing private equity to many young growing companies, much in the way of the British Merchant Bank investing model, predating by decades the private equity endeavors of Wall Street firms. Jack's acumen as an investor was combined in fashion with his ability to form enduring personal relationships with his partners. Several generations of companies and business leaders came to know Jack as not only a smart investment banker, but as a loyal and reliable friend as well. Jack's influence grew beyond Arkansas to the boardrooms of corporate America and to the halls of Washington D.C.; his opinions were sought by investors, CEOs and politicians.

Many of Stephens's private investments were quite successful. In the late 1960s, anticipating the coming revolution in bank data processing, Jack Stephens deployed excess computing capacity at Union Life Insurance Company, which was owned by him and his family. With $400,000 in start-up capital invested, he created Systematics, which would later become a leader in the bank data processing industry. Systematics was eventually acquired by Alltel Corporation and became Alltel Information Services. AIS was later acquired by Fidelity National Financial.

Another late 1960s investment was Purdue Airlines, which Stephens established (initially owning 80%) in partnership with Purdue University. Purdue Airlines operated DC-9 jet aircraft from 1969 through 1971. The carrier also operated Playboy Magazine founder Hugh Hefner's private jet, also a DC-9. The airline was liquidated in early 1971, with Southwest Airlines hiring the entire pilot corps to speed its launch later that year.

== Wal-Mart ==
In 1970, Stephens Inc., along with White Weld & Co., raised $4.95 million in an IPO for a small Arkansas-based discount retailer, Wal-Mart Stores, Inc., owned by Sam Walton and his family. The capital, and subsequently raised capital, helped to fund Wal-Mart's rise from $32 million in sales to the largest retailer in the world.

== Superdome ==
In 1971, Stephens Inc., together with First National Bank of Commerce, underwrote $113 million in tax-exempt bonds to help build the Louisiana Superdome. At that time, this was among the largest single tax-exempt bond issues in history and Wall Street had turned it down.

== Worthen Bank ==
In 1983, the Stephens family invested in Worthen Banking Corporation, which was headquartered in Little Rock, Arkansas. In 1985, Worthen's capital was wiped out by the bankruptcy of Bevil, Bressler & Schulman. A rights offering led by Jack Stephens was implemented allowing shareholders to provide the funds necessary to revitalize the bank and keep it solvent. In 1994, Worthen was sold to Boatmen's Bancshares, and two years later, Boatmen's was sold to NationsBank, which in turn merged into Bank of America.

== 1986–2000 ==
In 1986, Warren Stephens, Jack's son, was named chief executive officer of Stephens Inc. In 1989, Stephens advised Tyson Foods in its acquisition of Holly Farms, resulting in a $1.5 billion hostile takeover. In 1992, Stephens invested in Viking Range Corporation, providing the growth capital needed to seriously expand the company into a leading national brand. In 1993, Stephens purchased Donrey Media, renaming it Stephens Media Group. When sold in 2015, Stephens Media Group's properties include the Las Vegas Review-Journal and daily and weekly papers.

== 2001–present ==
In 2006, Warren Stephens acquired 100% of Stephens Inc. A little over a year later, the global economic crisis, triggered by the meltdown of the housing markets, severely impacted financial markets and posed a grave threat to all financial institutions. Having avoided the over leveraging that brought down other investment firms, Stephens remained sound and continued to grow during this period.

Since its acquisition by Warren, Stephens Inc. has grown substantially. The Public Finance Department has experienced a 47% growth, the Private Client Group has grown 66%, the Research Department has experienced a 71% growth, and Investment Banking has grown 95%. Stephens Insurance, an affiliate of Stephens Inc., has grown more than six times since the 2006 acquisition.

Stephens Private Equity Group, known as Stephens Capital Partners, continued to find excellent opportunities in the 2000s as well. Three of their investments include the following:

- In 2001, Stephens invested in Hotchkis & Wiley, a Los Angeles-based, value oriented, investment management firm. H&W currently has approximately $21 billion under management.
- In 2007, Stephens invested in Sexing Technologies, a worldwide leader in Sexed Semen and Embryo production in the livestock industry. ST is well known around the globe as one of the top sources for assistance in locating and exporting quality semen, embryos, and live cattle from the United States.
- In 2010, Stephens helped to create Halifax Media. Based in Daytona, FL., Halifax owns and operates 33 newspapers, primarily in the southeast.
- In February 2015, Stephens Media LLC was sold to New Media Investment Group of New York for $102.5 million in cash. The sale included eight daily newspapers and 65 weekly publications in seven states.
- In February 2023, Stephens joined Williams Racing in a multi-year partnership as their official investment banking partner for the 2023 season.

In January 2025, Warren Stephens, CEO of the family-owned investment bank Stephens Inc., announced his retirement as he prepares to assume the role of U.S. ambassador to the United Kingdom. His sons, Miles and John Stephens, have been appointed co-chief executives, marking the third generation of family leadership at the firm. Their sister, Laura Brookshire, will serve as senior executive vice president and chair of the executive committee. This succession plan underscores the family's dedication to maintaining control and continuity within their financial enterprise.

== Businesses ==
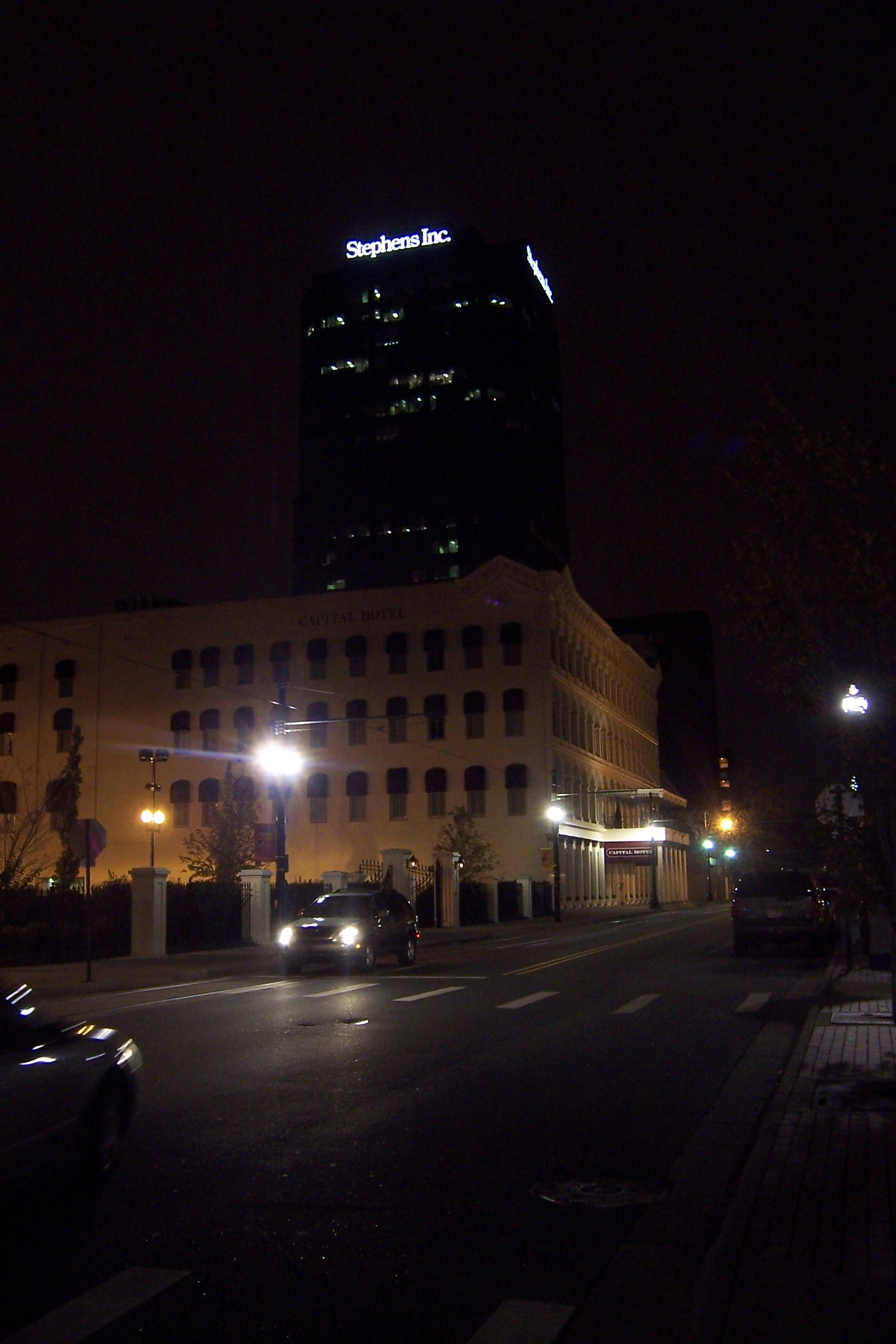
The Stephens building at night. It is one of the tallest in Little Rock.

- Private Client Group
- Capital Markets
- Public Finance
- Investment Banking
- Research
- Capital Management
- Insurance and Mutual Fund Services
