= Jackson T. Stephens =

American oilman and investment banker

- Born: Jackson Thomas Stephens; August 9, 1923; Prattsville, Arkansas, U.S.
- Died: July 23, 2005 (aged 81)
- Occupations: CEO, Stephens Inc.

Chairman of Augusta National Golf Club
- In office 1991–1998
- Preceded by: Hord Hardin
- Succeeded by: William "Hootie" Johnson

Jackson Thomas Stephens, Sr. (August 9, 1923 – July 23, 2005) was an American oilman and investment banker. He was the CEO of Little Rock, Arkansas-based Stephens Inc., a privately owned financial services company. He was also the chairman of Augusta National Golf Club from 1991 to 1998.

== Background ==
Stephens was born on a farm near Prattsville in Grant County in south Arkansas, the youngest of six children. and grew up during the Depression. He graduated in 1941 from Columbia Military Academy in Columbia, Tennessee. Stephens attended the United States Naval Academy, where he met and became friends with future president of the United States Jimmy Carter. Upon graduating he joined the Little Rock investment house Stephens Inc., which his brother W. R. "Witt" Stephens had started in 1933. By 1994, Stephens, Inc. was listed as one of the biggest institutional shareholders in thirty large multinationals including the Arkansas-based Worthen Bank, Tyson Foods, Wal-Mart, and Alltel. Stephens was the father of Jackson Thomas Stephens, Jr. and Warren Stephens.

== Career highlights ==
- 1962 – became a member of the Augusta National Golf Club, the host of the annual Masters tournament. Later became the club's chairman from 1991 to 1998.
- 1968 – the Stephenses launch Systematics, Inc, a data processing company. In 1990, Systematics was sold to Alltel and became Alltel Information Services (which in turn would be sold to Fidelity Information Systems).
- 1970 – underwrote the initial public offering for Wal-Mart Stores.
- 1976 – forms Stephens Finance Ltd. in Hong Kong with Mochtar Riady.

== Politics ==
Stephens and his wife, Mary Anne, were such outspoken backers of Republican causes, and in particular of President Ronald Reagan, that in the early 1980s they were known as "Mr. and Mrs. Republican of Arkansas." In a rare interview in the early 1980s, Jackson declared that Reagan was giving the country "exactly what we need. Some of us call it tough love." Stephens and his company donated $100,000 to the national Republican Party both in 1988 and 1991. Stephens and his wife were key backers of the unsuccessful bid of U.S. Representative Tommy F. Robinson of Arkansas's 2nd congressional district for the Republican gubernatorial nomination in 1990.. The Stephens family, through Stephens Inc. and Worthen Bank, in which Stephen holds a minority ownership interest, were key financial backers and fundraisers for Bill Clinton and the Democratic Party during his presidential election in 1992.

== Philanthropy and legacy ==
- Stephens gave $48 million to the University of Arkansas for Medical Sciences to establish the Jackson T. Stephens Spine and Neurosciences Institute.
- Stephens gave more than $30 million toward to Little Rock's Episcopal Collegiate School endowment in 2004.
- Stephens gave $20.4 million to the University of Arkansas at Little Rock for a special-events center and a basketball arena that would later be named Jack Stephens Center.
- The football field at the United States Naval Academy is named Jack Stephens Field to honor Stephens and his gift of funds for its renovation.
- Dickey-Stephens Park (home to AA Arkansas Travelers) in North Little Rock, Arkansas, is named for Stephens and his brother "Witt", along with the Dickey brothers, Bill and "Skeets", both former major leaguers.
- Stephens gave some $3 million to construct the Prattsville Community Center in his hometown of Prattsville, Arkansas.
- Arkansas Aviation Historical Society inducted Stephens into the Arkansas Aviation Hall of Fame in 1994.

== Awards and honors ==
- 1994 – Arkansas Aviation Hall of Fame
- 1994 – Golden Plate Award of the American Academy of Achievement
- 1998 – Arkansas State Golf Association Hall of Fame
- 1999 – Arkansas Business Hall of Fame
- 2000 – Arkansas Sports Hall of Fame
