= Sungard Availability Services =

Information technology company

- Type: Privately held
- Industry: IT infrastructure; Cloud computing; Disaster Recovery; Workplace Recovery
- Founded: 1978
- Headquarters: Wayne, Pennsylvania, USA
- Key people: Brett Diamond, CEO
- Products: IT Infrastructure, Private and Public Cloud, Disaster Recovery, Workplace Recovery, Consulting Services
- Owner: Angelo, Gordon & Co., LP; The Carlyle Group Global Credit; FS Investments and GSO Capital Partners LP.
- Number of employees: 3,000
- Parent: Fidelity Information Services
- Website: www.sungardas.com

Sungard Availability Services (Sungard AS) was a provider of IT production and recovery services. In 2021 it had annual revenues of approximately $773 million and offices in 12 countries. The company used its experience in recovery to design, build and run production environments that were resilient and available. At its peak, with 1,500 IT and business professionals, the company managed 20 mobile facilities staged in strategic locations and 75 hardened data centers and workplace recovery facilities connected by a redundant, global dedicated network backbone.

The company filed for Chapter 11 bankruptcy proceedings in April of 2022. In November of 2022 it concluded an agreement to sell the majority of its global assets to two competitors, 11:11 Systems and 365 Data Centers. After 40 years of operation, the company ended North American operations in 2023 following the transition of its assets and client accounts to 11:11 and 365.

== History ==
SunGard Data Systems (SDS) was formed in 1983 through the leveraged buyout of a division of Sun Oil Company. In 1986, SunGard Data Systems went public through an IPO and was listed on the NASDAQ as SNDT. In 1997 the stock became listed on the NYSE as SDS.

In 2001, SunGard acquired Comdisco’s business continuity services extending the company’s reach to Europe. Additional acquisitions of Guardian IT in 2002 and Inflow in 2005 further extended the company’s reach.

In 2005, SDS was purchased by a team led by SilverLake in a transaction valued at $11.3 billion. Additional SDS acquisitions followed, including their 2007 purchase of Vericenter to provide managed hosting and production availability and a 2010 acquisition of 365 Hosting Limited, an Ireland-based hosted infrastructure provider of Managed Services and Cloud offerings.

On April 1, 2014, Sungard Availability Services split off from SunGard Data Systems, to become an independent company.

In April 2019, Sungard AS announced it would file for Chapter 11 bankruptcy protection "as part of a consensual agreement with a majority of its creditors to reduce its nearly $1.3 billion debt by more than two-thirds."

On May 3, 2019, Sungard AS successfully completed its financial restructuring and emerged from Chapter 11 bankruptcy.

On April 11, 2022, Sungard AS again filed for voluntary Chapter 11 reorganization, citing as reasons rising energy costs and the COVID-19 pandemic having caused organizations to shift to remote work.

On November 3, 2022 SungardAS concluded an agreement to sell the majority of its global assets to two competitors, 11:11 Systems and 365 Data Centers. With the agreements 90% of its staff and 12 of its data centers in North America transitioned to the two companies, with the remaining data centers being wound down shortly thereafter.

== Services ==
Sungard Availability Services offered IT production and recovery services that included IT infrastructure, cloud computing, disaster recovery, and workplace recovery. Infrastructure services included traditional colocation which was enhanced with Megaport cloud connectivity in August and September 2020. Cloud services included public and private cloud services that leveraged technologies from Dell Technologies, VMware, and Amazon Web Services.
