= SunGard =

American company

SunGard Data Systems
- Type: Private
- Industry: Information Technology
- Founded: 1983; 43 years ago
- Defunct: 2015
- Fate: Acquired by FIS
- Headquarters: Wayne, Pennsylvania, U.S.
- Key people: Gary Norcross (CEO)
- Products: Computer software Support services
- Revenue: ▼$4.991 billion (2011)
- Owner: FIS
- Number of employees: 13,000 (2014)

SunGard was an American multinational company based in Wayne, Pennsylvania, which provided software and services to education, financial services, and public sector organizations. It was formed in 1983 as a spin-off of the computer services division of Sun Oil Company.

In August 2005, the company was acquired by seven private equity firms for $11.3 billion and de-listed from the NYSE.SunGard was ranked at 480th in the U.S. Fortune 500 list in the year 2012.

In August 2015, FIS announced that it had signed a definitive agreement to acquire SunGard.

== History ==
SunGard provided software and processing for financial services, K-12 and Higher Education, and the public sector. The name of the company originally was an acronym which stood for Sun Guaranteed Access to Recovered Data, a reference to the disaster recovery business it helped pioneer.

It also provided continuity-assurance and production data center hosting services, now part of SunGard AS. SunGard had offices in many parts of the world outside of the United States including Paris, South Africa, Tunis, Stockholm, and the United Kingdom.

=== Acquisitions ===
SunGard completed more than 150 acquisitions over 20 years, including GL Trade.

Among the largest acquisitions were:

- In 1997, SunGard Data Systems acquired Infinity Financial Technology, a designer of trading and risk-management software, for about US$390 million, where $313 million were paid in stock and $77 million went in cash.
- In 1999, SunGard acquired Israel's Oshap Technologies (Nasdaq:OSHSF) for $210M in stock, giving SunGard a foothold in both the middleware (via Oshap's subsidiary Mint Communications) and front-office portfolio management systems markets (via Oshap's subsidiary Decalog).
- In 2001, SunGard acquired Comdisco Inc.’s computer disaster-recovery business after a U.S. appeals court rebuffed a request by the Justice Department to halt the $825 million transaction.
- In 2004, SunGard acquired Systems & Computer Technology Corp. (SCT) for $590 million in cash.
- In 2008, SunGard acquired GL Trade, a Paris-based financial services firm for nearly US$1 billion; in a first tranche a 65% stake in GL Trade was acquired for $625 million, including effect of outstanding stock options. The deal encompasses the NYSE Euronext's 40% stake in GL Trade, however 25.4% were in the hand of the founders and 36.6% of the shares were free float. The deal was considered to be financially hazardous, given that GL Trade reported revenues of €203 million and an EBITDA of €26 million (fiscal year 2007).
- In 2008, SunGard acquired IT company Strohl Systems for an estimated $450 million cash transaction. Strohl Systems became the software division of SunGard Availability Services.
- In 2010, Sungard acquired 365 Hosting Limited cloud computing and data centre services company

=== Leveraged buyout 2005 ===
Formerly listed on the NYSE (ticker symbol SDS) on August 11, 2005, the company was acquired by a consortium of seven private equity investment firms in a transaction valued at $11.3 billion. The partners in the acquisition were Silver Lake Partners, Bain Capital, Blackstone Group, Goldman Sachs Alternatives, Kohlberg Kravis Roberts, Providence Equity Partners, and TPG Capital.

=== De-merger activities ===
- In December 2010, Capita Group plc acquired SunGard Public Sector Holdings Ltd (part of the business servicing the UK public sector) for £86 million. The new business was known as Capita Secure Information Systems; it has now been renamed Capita Secure Managed Services.
- In August 2011 Datatel and SunGard's Higher Education group announced a definitive agreement to combine businesses and operate as one company, with Datatel’s current chief executive officer, John Speer, the chief executive officer. Affiliates of private equity firm Hellman & Friedman LLC acquired the SunGard Higher Education businesses from SunGard Data Systems Inc. for an aggregate cash purchase price of US$1.775 billion and combined the acquired businesses. The combined company was to operate under a new name, Ellucian, as announced at the 2012 annual users' conference.
- On 7 December 2011 Hellman & Friedman, Datatel and SunGard announced that the proposed combination had cleared Department of Justice review. In March 2012, the finalization of the combination into Ellucian was announced. SunGard's total debt of US$8.08 billion was alleviated by selling this business line; nonetheless, a projected annual revenue shortage of $580 million can be assumed, resulting in a total revenue projection for the fiscal 2011 of $4.7 billion, suggesting a negative revenue trend.
- In March 2014 SunGard completed the split-off of its Availability Services business, forming the independent company Sungard AS. Andy Stern continued to lead the Sungard AS business.
- In 2015, SunGard was acquired by FIS.
- In February 2017, Vista Equity Partners acquired SunGard's Public Sector and Education businesses from FIS, and renamed and rebranded SunGard Public Sector as Superion by April 2017, while adding SunGard Education to its own PowerSchool holdings.
