= Visma =

Norwegian software and IT company

Visma Software International AS
- Type: Private
- Industry: Computer software
- Genre: Business software provider
- Founded: 1996; 30 years ago in Oslo, Norway
- Headquarters: Oslo, Norway
- Area served: Europe and Latin America
- Key people: Ron Kalifa (non-executive chair); Merete Hverven (CEO)
- Products: Business software
- Revenue: ▲€2,804 million (2024)
- Operating income: ▲€893 million (2024)
- Owner: HgCapital (70.2%); GIC (14.2%); ICG (3.1%)
- Number of employees: 17,500 (2025)
- Website: visma.com

Visma Software International AS is a Norwegian privately held provider of business software, headquartered in Oslo. The company develops cloud-based solutions for accounting, enterprise resource planning (ERP), payroll, invoicing, HR and other administrative processes for small and medium-sized enterprises and public-sector organisations.

The Visma Group operates across Europe and Latin America through a network of software companies. In 2025, the group reported more than 2.4 million customers. The majority of Visma is owned by HgCapital, a private equity firm, alongside other institutional investors.

== History ==
Visma, a portmanteau of "visual management", was formed through the merger of three local Norwegian companies—Multisoft, SpecTec and Dovre Information Systems—in 1996. It was listed on the Oslo Stock Exchange later that year.

The major event of 2000 was the sale of Visma Marine's operations to Dutch company Station12. Visma acquired Spcs (formerly Scandinavian PC Systems), the Swedish market leader within the small business segment in February 2001.

In May 2006, HgCapital made an offer for the company worth €552 million; HgCapital then took the company private. Visma then entered the Dutch market through the acquisition of software company AccountView in December 2006.

KKR acquired a 76.9% ownership in Visma in September 2010. However, KKR then sold its stake for $1.8 billion in June 2017.

In May 2015, Visma acquired the Danish cloud accounting company e-conomic and the Swedish accounting software company SpeedLedger from HgCapital.

In February 2017, Visma acquired the biggest employee benefits platform in Denmark, LogBuy.

Visma acquired Raet, a large Dutch enterprise providing payroll and HCM (Human Capital Management) software in May 2018, and Yuki, a Dutch bookkeeping software platform in August 2020. It then bought Holded, a Spanish ERP and accounting company, in June 2021, and ProSaldo.net, an Austrian bookkeeping and billing software platform, in October 2021.

The company acquired Dutch financial software company Lyanthe in March 2022 and Belgian software developers IonProjects and Teamleader in April 2022. Visma sold its IT consulting division to CVC Capital Partners in June 2022.

Visma entered the French market via the acquisition of the software developer, Inqom, in September 2022. It then entered the German market with the acquisitions of German financial software companies H&H and BuchhaltungsButler in January 2023. It also acquired Belgian company Silverfin, a provider of cloud accounting software, in October 2023. In April 2025, Visma acquired a minority stake in the German-Belgian fintech company Accountable, which had introduced the first AI-based tax assistant in March 2024.

== Visma Software Nordic ==
Visma Software Nordic is a regional division created in 2024 through the merger of Visma Software AS (Norway), Visma Software AB (Sweden), and NextGen AB. The division provides cloud-based ERP solutions (Enterprise Resource Planning; business management systems) to medium and large enterprises in the Nordic countries. The main products are Visma Net, an ERP system for small and medium-sized businesses, and Business NXT, developed for larger organizations with complex requirements.

== Sponsorship ==
In 2018, Visma signed a five-year sponsorship deal with the professional road cycling team Team-Jumbo Visma, which was one of the teams that competed in the UCI World Tour. The sponsorship began 1 January 2019.
