= TSYS =

Subsidiary of FIS

Total System Services, Inc.
- Industry: Payment processor
- Founded: 1983; 43 years ago
- Headquarters: Columbus, Georgia, U.S.
- Key people: M. Troy Woods (chairman); Jeff Sloan (CEO); Paul M. Todd (CFO)
- Services: Credit card processing
- Revenue: ▲$4.028 billion (2018)
- Operating income: ▲$0.822 billion (2018)
- Net income: ▲$0.577 billion (2018)
- Total assets: ▲$7.468 billion (2018)
- Total equity: ▲$2.585 billion (2018)
- Number of employees: 4900
- Parent: Fidelity National Information Services (FIS)
- Website: www.tsys.com

Total System Services, Inc. (TSYS) is an American financial technology company based in Columbus, Georgia, that provides payment processing services, merchant services and related payment services. It also provides reloadable prepaid debit cards and payroll cards, and demand deposit accounts to the underbanked.

The firm is the largest third-party payment processor for issuing banks in North America, with a 40% market share, and one of the largest in Europe. After merging with Global Payments in 2019, it was sold to FIS seven years later.

== History ==
Founded in 1959 as a division of Columbus Bank and Trust (now Synovus), it began processing cards for other banks in 1974. After becoming a public company following an IPO in 1983, the firm merged its merchant processing services with those of Visa Inc. in 1995.

In July 2004, a month before buying Clarity Payment Solutions for $53 million, it began processing the credit cards issued by J.P. Morgan Chase. In 2008, a year before Synovus completed its corporate spin-off, TSYS launched n>genuity, a quarterly publication on the world of payments.

In 2010, the company acquired a 51% stake in the merchant acquisition business of First National Bank of Omaha for $150.5 million, which was renamed TSYS Merchant Solutions; the remaining 49% stake was acquired in January 2011. In May 2011, the company acquired TermNet.

In August 2012, the company announced a joint venture with Central Payment Co. LLC, a direct merchant acquirer. In December, it acquired ProPay, a Utah-based company with over 250,000 merchants.

In July 2013, TSYS acquired Netspend, a prepaid debit card provider, for $1.4 billion. In November, the company announced TSYS Merchant Insights, a partnership with Womply, a San Francisco-based startup, to provide revenue, social media, and reputation analysis tools to all TSYS merchants.

In June 2014, CEO Philip W. Tomlinson retired and was replaced with M. Troy Woods, then the president and COO. In April 2016, the company acquired TransFirst for $2.35 billion, making it the 6th largest acquirer in the United States. In June 2016, the firm acquired the remaining 45% stake in TSYS Managed Services EMEA from The Merchants Group Limited.

In 2017, its lobbying with the Republican Party was credited for a bill that would remove CFPB limits on overdraft fees; 10-12% of NetSpend's revenue comes from these fees. Later, it acquired a former Citigroup card production facility in Columbus, Ohio and invested $25 million to build out a second, 200,000 square feet (19,000 m^{2}) credit card production facility, with a capacity to produce 67 million credit cards per year.

Between January and June 2018, TSYS acquired Cayan for $1.05 billion and Jacksonville, Florida-based iMobile3 for $13.4 million. Upon completing its merger with TSYS on September 18, 2019, Global Payments began trading under the symbol GPN on the NYSE and grew to have 24,000 employees worldwide.

On January 9, 2026, Fidelity National Information Services (FIS) completed its acquisition of TSYS.
