= Systematics, Inc. =

Arkansas data processing firm

Systematics Incorporated was a data processing company acquired in 1968 by Arkansas superinvestor Jackson T. Stephens. In 1990 it was sold to Alltel Corporation, and today is a part of Fidelity Information Systems.

Fidelity Information Systems still uses the name 'Systematics' as the name of a retail banking software product suite.

Systematics employees have held two reunions, most recently the 40th Anniversary Reunion in 2008. Pictures from both reunions and current information about former employees were available for a while at the website “www.sireunion.org,” which no longer exists.

== Beginnings ==
Systematics was founded in 1968 by University of Arkansas graduate Walter Smiley, who learned of the high software costs and other difficulties faced by small banks in trying to use data processing software from his experiences working with IBM and in the banking industry. Smiley recognized a niche that could be filled for medium-sized banks in this space, and sought funding to start his own company. Through Jon Jacoby, Smiley was introduced to the Stephens family, who agreed to invest $400,000 in Walter and Systematics in return for 80% equity stake.

Systematics distinguished itself early on from other players in the industry. "In the data processing business," according to Walter, "it’s real easy to get yourself in a position where you’ve got to sell for tomorrow for the sake of today. The Stephens people were just the opposite. They always encouraged us to prepare for the long term, to do it right."

Walter quietly expanded his business over the next 12 years, eventually finding a way to license its software to banks, and ultimately going public. In 1990 it was sold to Alltel Corporation. The name was changed to Alltel Information Services (AIS) in 1994. The Stephens family remained an investor, acquiring Alltel stock in the transaction. In 2003, Alltel sold the Information Services subsidiary to Fidelity National Financial. This business is known today as Fidelity National Information Services (FIS).

== Affiliations ==
One of the lawyers Stephens hired to represent the company was Hillary Rodham. After she joined the Rose Law Firm, Stephens employed the firm and engaged its partners — including the now-married Hillary Rodham Clinton, Vince Foster and Webster Hubbell — in several of his ventures.
