= Episcopal Collegiate School =

Private school in Little Rock, Arkansas, US

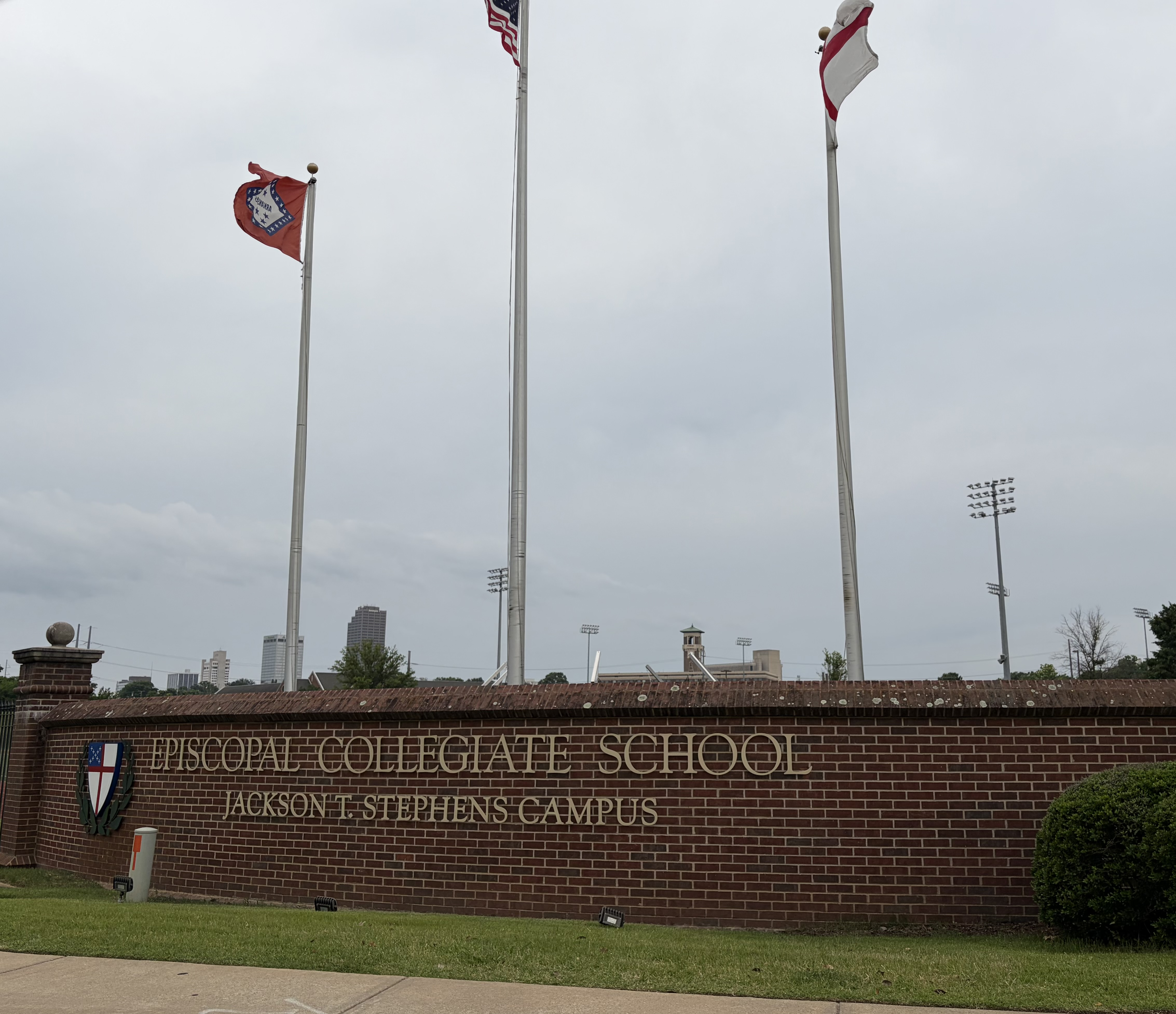
- The entrance of Episcopal Collegiate School on Cantrell Road

Location
- 1701 Cantrell Road; Little Rock, Pulaski County, Arkansas 72201; United States; 34°45′11″N 92°17′23″W

Information
- Funding type: Private
- Religious affiliation: Episcopal
- Denomination: Episcopalian
- Established: 1998 (28 years ago)
- Founder: Trinity Episcopal Cathedral
- NCES School ID: A0300097
- Headmaster: Jamie Griffin
- Faculty: 99
- Grades: PreK3 - 12
- Gender: Mixed
- Enrollment: 800
- Student to teacher ratio: 7:1
- Colors: Hunter Green, white, navy blue
- Sports: American football, baseball, basketball, cheerleading, cross country, golf, softball, tennis, track, volleyball, wrestling, rowing, and lacrosse
- Mascot: Wildcat
- Endowment: $50 million
- Website: www.episcopalcollegiate.org

Episcopal Collegiate School is an independent college preparatory school located in Little Rock, Arkansas established in 1998.

== About ==
In 2021-22 academic year, the school had a total student body of 738 students and an average class size of 11, and the student to teacher ratio is approximately 7:1.

The school has a financial endowment of over $50 million, which was contributed by Jackson T. Stephens, his son, Warren Stephens and daughter-in-law, Harriet C. Stephens.

Episcopal Collegiate School's colors are hunter green, white, and navy blue and its mascot is the Wildcat.

== Accreditation ==
Episcopal is accredited by Southwestern Association of Episcopal Schools and Arkansas Non-Public Schools Accrediting Association. Episcopal also has affiliations or is a member of: National Association of Episcopal Schools, School and Student Service for Financial Aid, Association for Supervision and Curriculum Development, International Reading Association, National Council of Teachers of Mathematics, Arkansas Activities Association, National Science Teachers' Association, and National Council of Teachers of English.

== Athletics ==
Episcopal offers football, tennis, golf, volleyball, cross country, cheerleading, boys and girls basketball, wrestling, baseball, lacrosse, soccer, softball, rowing, and track. They have won the following state championships:

- Boys Basketball 2014, 2015, 2017
- Girls cross country 2021, 2022, 2023, 2024, 2025
- Boys Golf 2003, 2009, 2011, 2012, 2023
- Boys tennis 2003, 2004, 2005, 2007, 2008, 2009, 2010, 2011, 2013, 2014, 2015, 2016, 2017, 2018, 2019, 2020, 2021
- Girls tennis 2008, 2009, 2010, 2011, 2012, 2013, 2014, 2015, 2016, 2017, 2018, 2019, 2022, 2023
- Track and field 2013
- Girls volleyball 2019
- 8-Man Football 2020, 2021
- Boys cross country 2020
- Girls Soccer 2023, 2024
