= Cardsave =

UK payment processing company acquired by WorldPay

CardSave
- Type: Private
- Industry: Electronic Payment Services
- Founded: 1995
- Headquarters: Grimsby, United Kingdom
- Key people: Clive Kahn (CEO)
- Services: Payment Services
- Parent: WorldPay
- Website: www.cardsave.net

CardSave was a British payment processing company based in Grimsby. It was renamed as WorldPay in February 2014 after being acquired by WorldPay in December 2010.

It has head office is in Grimsby, England, with offices in London and Nottingham. However, since the merge with WorldPay they now have offices in Gateshead, Cambridge and Manchester as well.

== History ==
Cardsave was formed in 1995 by an independent retailer to negotiate lower rates for credit card processing, their aim was to reduce the processing charges that were set by the main commercial banks. Although they offered their services to various businesses, their main clients were tyre fitters and hairdressers.

In 2007 Clive Kahn, former Chief Executive of foreign exchange company Travelex, led a £72m buyout of Cardsave, backed by private equity firm, Exponet.

In March 2010, Cardsave acquired TNS, a UK POS terminal hire business, which mainly provides terminals to petrol stations. On 21 December 2010 Cardsave was acquired by a former partner company, the UK card processor WorldPay.

Cardsave was re-branded to WorldPay in February 2014.
