= Marshall & Ilsley =

U.S. bank founded in 1847

Marshall & Ilsley Corporation
- Trade name: Marshall & Ilsley Bank; M&I Bank
- Type: Public
- Traded as: NYSE: MI
- Industry: Banking
- Founded: 1847; 179 years ago in Milwaukee, Wisconsin as Samuel Marshall & Co.
- Defunct: July 5, 2011; 15 years ago
- Fate: Absorbed by BMO Harris Bank
- Successor: BMO Harris Bank
- Headquarters: Milwaukee, Wisconsin, United States
- Key people: Dennis J. Kuester; (Chairman); Mark Furlong; (President, CEO)
- Products: Retail and commercial banking, trusts and investment management
- Revenue: US$4.025 billion (2008)
- Net income: ▼US$2.043 billion (2008)
- Website: Archived official website

Marshall & Ilsley Corporation (also known as M&I Bank) was a U.S. bank and diversified financial services corporation headquartered in Milwaukee, Wisconsin, that was purchased by Bank of Montreal in 2010.

The bank was founded in 1847 and by 2008 the bank had assets of $63.5 billion and over 250 branches. After the acquisition, Bank of Montreal combined the Marshall & Ilsley Corporation operations into its existing U.S. subsidiary Harris Bank.

== History ==
In 1847, Samuel Marshall, a Pennsylvania native, founded an exchange brokerage in a downtown Milwaukee cobbler's shop. Although Wisconsin did not allow state-chartered banks at the time, Marshall's company provided a number of traditional banking services, such as deposits and loans. In 1849, he took on Maine native Charles Ilsley as a partner, and the company took the Marshall & Ilsley name a year later. When Wisconsin finally allowed state-chartered banking in 1852, M&I took out the first such charter, for a bank in Madison.

For most of its first century, the bank had a reputation for conservatism. This approach actually worked to M&I's advantage during major financial crises such as the Panic of 1893 and the stock market crash of 1929; it was one of the few major banks in Wisconsin to survive the latter. However, after selling the Madison bank in the late 19th century, it did business solely in Milwaukee for over six decades. The first real expansion came in 1958, when M&I reorganized as the leading subsidiary of the Bank Stock Corporation of Milwaukee after over a century as a partnership. The new company bought two of its competitors, Northern Bank and Bank of Commerce. The three banks retained their own names and headquarters within a single corporate structure. When regulators forced the sell-off of Bank of Commerce in 1969, they allowed Bank Stock Corporation to buy other banks in areas where there were no competing banks, and could also build branches within a three-mile radius of Milwaukee. Accordingly, Bank Stock changed its name to Marshall & Ilsley Corporation in 1971.

In 1986, Marshall & Ilsley expanded outside of Wisconsin by acquiring Arizona-based Thunderbird Bank.

In 1987, Marshall & Ilsley attempted a hostile takeover of the Milwaukee-based Marine Corporation, the parent of Marine Bank. Marine turned down M&I overtures and chose Banc One Corporation's offer instead. Marshall & Ilsley did successfully acquire Central Wisconsin Bankshares Inc. of Wausau in a smaller deal for $83.6 million.

On September 20, 1993, M&I announced a merger with Wisconsin-based Valley Bancorporation, converting Valley stock to M&I in a stock transaction valued at $875 million. The merger converted 155 Valley Bank locations to M&I. 154 of these were in Wisconsin, and one in Illinois. At the time of the merger, Valley Bancorporation had more bank locations than M&I did.

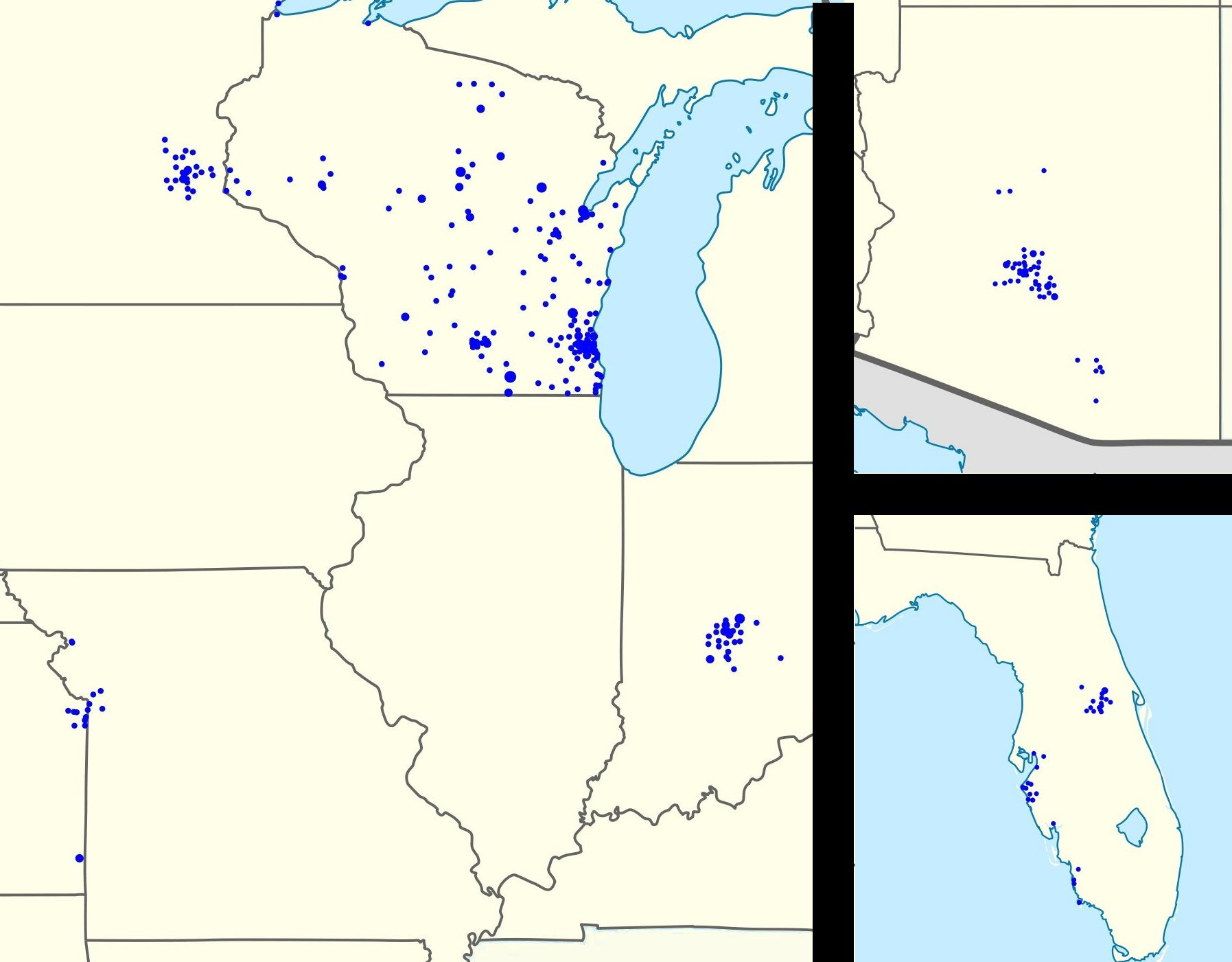
Marshall & Ilsley footprint.

In December 2006, M&I signed a definitive agreement to acquire United Heritage Bankshares of Florida with 13 locations in the Orlando area.

In 2007, Metavante Corporation, formerly a wholly owned subsidiary known as Marshall and Ilsley Data Services, was spun off into a separate publicly traded company and began trading on the New York Stock Exchange.

On January 2, 2008, M&I announced it had completed the acquisition of First Indiana (Nasdaq: FINB), which had 32 locations in central Indiana, for about $529 million.

M&I had acquired Southwest Bank of St. Louis in 2002 through its purchase of the bank's holding company, Mississippi Valley Bancshares, and on July 1, 2010, merged Southwest Bank into M&I Marshall and Ilsley Bank.

In mid-August 2009 the bank was named as one of the largest of more than 150 U.S. lenders that owned nonperforming loans, which made up more than 5 percent—a threshold beyond which a bank's equity can be wiped, according to regulators.

=== Acquisition and BMO Harris Bank ===
On December 17, 2010, Bank of Montreal (BMO) agreed to purchase Marshall & Ilsley in an all-stock transaction valued at about $4.1 billion. Marshall & Ilsley was combined with BMO's Harris Bank subsidiary based in Chicago, Illinois, on October 9, 2012, to form BMO Harris Bank.

By this time, M&I's footprint comprised:

- 194 offices throughout the state of Wisconsin
- 45 locations throughout Arizona
- 17 offices in Kansas City and nearby communities
- 17 offices on Florida's west coast
- 26 offices in metropolitan Minneapolis/St. Paul (Twin Cities), and one in Duluth, Minnesota
- 1 office in Las Vegas, Nevada
- 16 offices in the greater St. Louis area
- 32 offices in the greater Indianapolis area

On April 5, 2011, bank officers from M&I Bank, Harris Bank, and the Bank of Montreal announced the name of the bank after the merger will be "BMO Harris Bank". Both M&I Bank and Harris bank will be affected by the name change. The new logo will be similar to BMO's logo. The difference is the words "Bank of Montreal" will be replaced with "Harris Bank". The name change to "BMO Harris Bank" took place over a span of 18 months, completing on October 9, 2012.

On July 5, 2011, BMO Financial Group acquired Marshall & Ilsley Corporation through its subsidiary BMO Financial Corp. (formerly Harris Financial Corp). At the time of the acquisition, certain bank mergers also occurred. M&I Marshall & Ilsley Bank and M&I Bank N.A. (successor to M&I Bank FSB) merged into The Harris Bank N.A., forming BMO Harris Bank National Association as the merged company's legal banking entity.
