= Global Payments =

American technology company

Global Payments Inc.
- Type: Public
- Traded as: NYSE: GPN; S&P 500 component
- Industry: Payment processing
- Founded: 2000; 26 years ago, as a National Data Corporation subsidiary 2001; 25 years ago, spun off from parent company
- Headquarters: Three Alliance Center; Atlanta, Georgia, U.S.
- Key people: Cameron M. Bready (president and CEO); Andréa Carter (CHRO); David Rumph (CFO); Ryan Loy (CTO)
- Revenue: ▲US$10.1 billion (2024)
- Operating income: ▲US$2.33 billion (2024)
- Net income: ▲US$1.57 billion (2024)
- Total assets: ▼US$46.9 billion (2024)
- Total equity: ▼US$22.3 billion (2024)
- Number of employees: 27,000 (2024)
- Subsidiaries: Heartland Payment Systems; Worldpay, Inc.
- Website: globalpayments.com

Global Payments Inc. is an American multinational financial technology company that provides payment technology to merchants, issuers and consumers. In June 2021, the company was named to the Fortune 500. The company processes payments made through credit cards, debit cards, and digital and contactless payments.

== History ==
Global Payments was founded in 1996 and spun off from National Data Corporation, its former parent company, in 2001. Global Payments has been an independent, publicly traded company on the New York Stock Exchange having the ticker symbol “GPN” since its spin off.

In 2009, it paid $75 million for United Card Service, Russia's leading credit card processing company. In 2011, Global Payments's United Card Service bought Alfa-Bank's credit card processing unit. In October 2012, it acquired the smaller Accelerated Payment Technologies for $413 million. In October 2014, it purchased Australian payment processing company Ezidebit for $305 million. In January 2015, it bought Payment Processing (also known as PayPros), a California company, for $420 million.

In March 2015, Global Payments bought Realex Payments, an Irish-based payments gateway services company, for €115 million. On April 25, 2016, Global Payments completed the acquisition of Heartland Payment Systems for $4.3 billion. Both Global Payments and its subsidiary Heartland Payment Systems were among the leading credit card processing companies in 2016, according to Business Insider. Its headquarters moved from Sandy Springs, Georgia to Atlanta, Georgia in 2016.

In 2017, Global Payments initiated acquiring divisions of Active Networks. In 2018, Global Payments completed the acquisition of AdvancedMD. Also in 2018, Global Payments completed the acquisition of Sentral Education.

On May 28, 2019, Global Payments announced a $21.5 billion merger with TSYS. The merger was expected to trigger a Federal Trade Commission investigation. However, no such investigation occurred.

In August 2022, Global Payments entered a definitive agreement to acquire EVO Payments Inc. for nearly $4 billion.

On May 1, 2023, the company announced that CEO Jeffrey M. Sloan would resign, effective June 1, 2023. COO Cameron M. Bready succeeded him as CEO and president. As of July 2023, no single COO of the company had been named. Instead, two individuals were appointed to oversee domestic and international operations as Senior Executive Vice Presidents: Vince Lombardo and Bob Cortopassi, respectively.

Starting in early 2024 and continuing into September, Global Payments began laying off staff. These layoffs took place in the US, Canada, UK and India, as well as other smaller regional markets. Approximately 5400 employees were laid off during this time. Just weeks before the September lay offs were announced, Global Payments reported its second quarter results. Global Payments reported a net income of $296.4 million, a significant increase of $46.6 million compared to $249.7 million in the same quarter of 2023.

In April 2025, Global Payments agreed to acquire Worldpay, a payments technology provider, for $22 billion from GTCR and FIS. As part of this deal, it also agreed to sell its Issuer Solutions business, TSYS, to FIS for $13.5 billion. In January 2026, following regulatory approvals in multiple jurisdictions, it was announced the acquisition had been completed with a final transaction valued at $24.25 billion.

== TSYS Acquisition ==
On September 18, 2019, TSYS and Global Payments completed their merger agreement for $21.5 billion.

In January 2026, Global Payments sold TSYS to FIS for $13.5 billion.

== Services and operations ==
Global Payments provides payment services directly to merchants and indirectly through other financial organizations. Its technology-enabled services also support integrated payments, e-commerce, and omni-channel services.

Global Payments operates in more than 100 countries and serves 3.5 million merchants as well as 1,300 financial institutions. The company processes more than 50 billion transactions per year. After merging with TSYS in 2019, Global Payments has nearly 24,000 employees.

In 2020, 63 percent of the company's revenue was derived from "Merchant Solutions" 26 percent from Issuer Solutions, and 11 percent from the Business and Consumer Solutions segment, which operates as NetSpend. Eighty percent of Global Payments Merchant Solutions revenue was from North America, 15 percent was from Europe, and five percent was from Asia.

As of 2023, Global Payments does not have a singular Chief Operating Officer (COO). Instead the company divides operations into two distinct branches: domestic "US Merchant Solutions" headed by Senior Executive Vice President Vince Lombardo and international and vertical markets headed by Senior Executive Vice President Bob Cortopassi. Current CEO Cameron M. Bready was formerly the COO of the company, but no COO was announced as part of the succession plan.

== Data breaches and faults ==
In 2012, a data breach at Global Payments affected 1.5 million credit and debit card numbers. This breach eventually cost the company around $100 million. In 2015, a technical fault with Global Payments' systems led to thousands of British businesses being unable to accept credit card payments on Valentine's Day weekend.

== Lawsuits ==
=== Story v. Heartland Payments Systems ===
In 2019, Global Payments subsidiary Heartland Payments Systems was sued by Florida resident Max Story, alleging that Heartland defrauded parents of school children by leading them to believe that fees collected by the MySchoolBucks online lunch payment service, which Heartland owns and operates and which is used by 2 million people with children in 30,000 schools in the US, were going to their children's schools when in fact the money was going to Heartland. Shortly after the lawsuit was filed, Heartland deposited $40,000 into Story's bank account in an attempt to nullify Story's legal standing to sue, but Story refused to accept the payment and reversed the deposit. To limit the number of people who could potentially join the lawsuit if it is granted class action status, Heartland also updated its terms of service in 2019 to require MySchoolBucks users to accept that they "will not be permitted to participate in the Story case as a class member".
