= National Data Corporation =

American information technology company

- Founded: 1967
- Founder: George Thorpe
- Fate: Acquired by McKesson Corporation
- Successor: Global Payments, NDC Health
- Headquarters: Atlanta, Georgia
- Key people: W.C. "Whit" Whitney (Chairman 1979-1992; CEO 1978-1991); Paul R. Garcia (Executive, 1999-2001)
- Website: nationaldata.com at the Wayback Machine (archived 2000-05-20)

National Data Corporation (NDC) was an American information technology company and payment processor founded in 1967 by Ret. U.S. Air Force Colonel George Thorpe. At its peak in 1987, NDC was the world's largest payments processor by volume.

NDC operated chiefly in health information services and electronic payment processing for credit and debit cards. The company spun off its eCommerce division, Global Payment Systems, to form Global Payments in 2001 while rebranding the healthcare division as NDCHealth. NDCHealth would later be acquired by Per-Se in 2005, which was subsequently acquired by McKesson Corporation in 2006.

Logo of NDCHealth as of 2004

== See also ==
- Hayes Microcomputer Products
