= Payfast =

South African fintech company

- Type: Subsidiary
- Industry: Financial technology
- Founded: 2007; 19 years ago
- Founder: Jonathan Smit and Andy Higgins
- Headquarters: Cape Town, South Africa
- Services: Payment facilitation
- Parent: Network International (since 2021)
- Website: payfast.io

Payfast is a South African fintech company and online payment service provider, based in Cape Town. The company provides ecommerce stores with an online payment gateway.

Established in 2007, Payfast has been a subsidiary of UAE-based Network International since 2021.

== History ==
Payfast was established in 2007, by Jonathan Smit, who developed the platform's core architecture, and Andy Higgins, who provided investment capital.

In 2009, the company processed its first credit card transaction, and had reached a total of 1,000 clients. The following year, it integrated with PrestaShop and WooCommerce.

In 2012, Payfast rolled out an integration with Shopify. At the time, the company had 10,000 merchants linked to its platform.

In 2015, Payfast processed its 1 millionth unique buyer transaction, and began processing Masterpass payments. The following year, the company integrated with Xero.

In July 2019, it was announced that Payfast would be acquired by Kenyan payment services company DPO Group - the fifth such acquisition by DPO since its founding in 2006. It formed part of a DPO expansion into eleven new African markets. At an announcement in Cape Town, DPO's chairman said the deal had been carried out through a mix of shares and cash, and that Payfast's management team would remain key shareholders in DPO Group. At the time of the deal, Payfast had over 55,000 South African e-commerce merchants as clients. The deal was said by DPO to be the largest acquisition of a payments processing company in Africa to date.

In September 2020, Payfast was supporting online payments for over 80,000 merchants in South Africa.

In 2021, Payfast's parent company, DPO Group, was acquired by UAE financial services company Network International for R3.5 billion. Three years later, the former's payments platform was rebranded to Payfast by Network.

== See also ==
- Cape Town tech industry
- Payment service provider
- List of online payment service providers
