= Warren Stephens =

American businessman (born 1957)

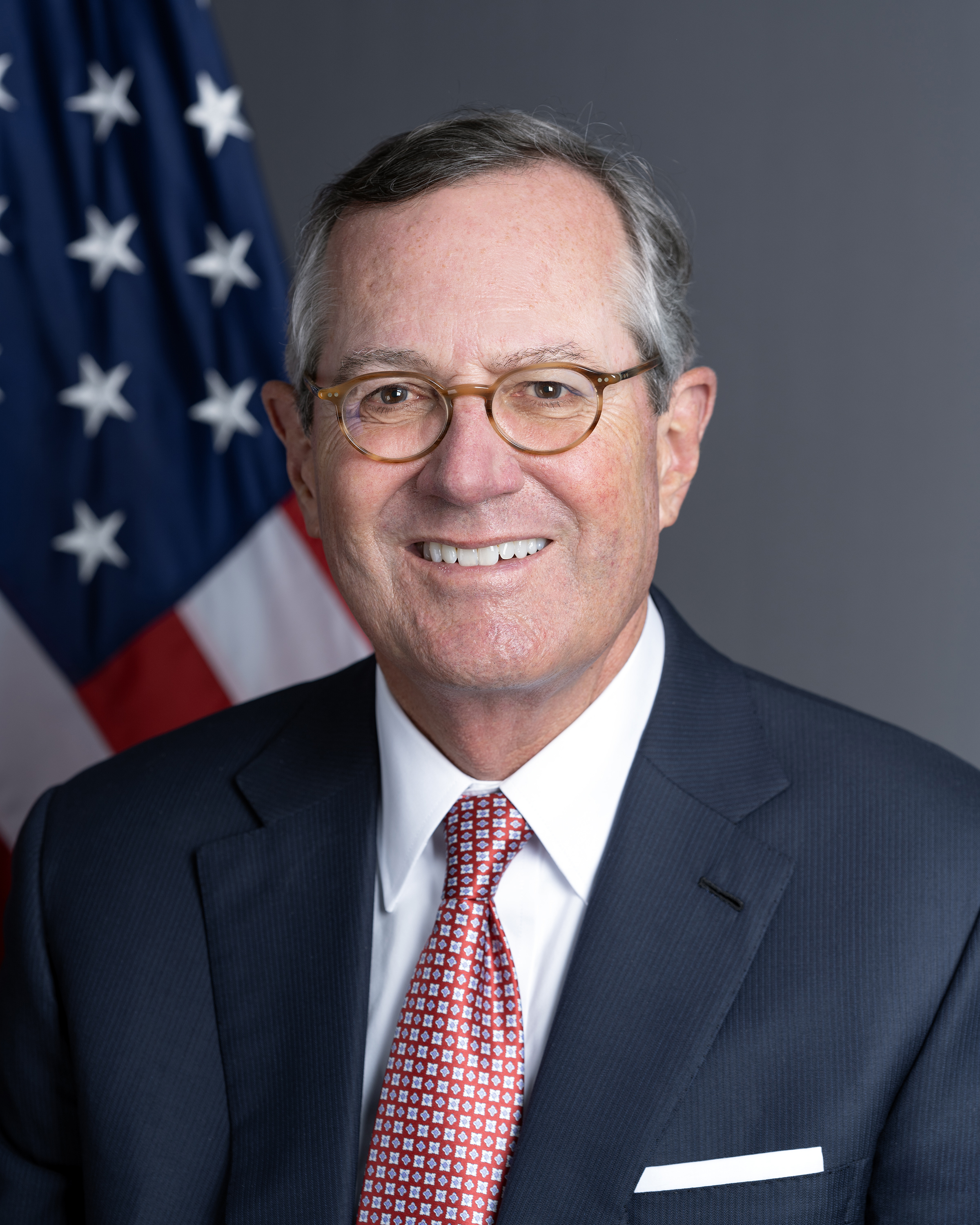
- Official portrait, 2025

68th United States Ambassador to the United Kingdom
- Incumbent
- Assumed office May 21, 2025
- President: Donald Trump
- Preceded by: Jane D. Hartley

Personal details
- Born: Warren Amerine Stephens; February 18, 1957 (age 69) Little Rock, Arkansas, U.S.
- Spouse: Harriet Stephens
- Children: 3
- Parent: Jackson T. Stephens (father)
- Education: Washington and Lee University (BA); Wake Forest University (MBA)
- Occupation: former Chairman, President, and CEO of Stephens Inc.

Warren Amerine Stephens (born February 18, 1957) is an American businessman who is the United States ambassador to the United Kingdom under President Donald Trump in his second administration. He is the former chairman, president and chief executive officer (CEO) of Stephens Inc., a privately held investment bank.

On December 2, 2024, President-elect Trump announced his nomination of Stephens to serve as the ambassador to the United Kingdom. Stephens had donated $6 million to Trump prior to the nomination. The U.S. Senate confirmed his nomination in a 59–39 vote. He was sworn in on April 30, 2025, and presented his letters of credence on May 21, 2025.

== Early life and education ==
Stephens was born in Little Rock, the son of Jackson T. Stephens and Mary Amerine Stephens. Warren's father, "Jack" Stephens, and his uncle, "Witt" Stephens, partnered as investors and financiers in the investment firm, Stephens Inc. His mother descends from Johann Hendrick Amrine, an orphan from 18th-century Switzerland who was found floating in the Rhine River following a flood and subsequently named Amrine, "in the Rhine."

Warren began his education in Little Rock, and in 1975, graduated from Trinity Presbyterian High School in Montgomery, Alabama. He graduated from Washington and Lee University in 1979 with a BA in economics, and received his MBA from Wake Forest University in 1981.

== Career ==
Stephens joined his father and uncle in the investment banking business in Little Rock, which had 139 employees. At that time, the firm resembled and operated much like one of the old British merchant banks, investing the firm's and family funds in various businesses and ventures, and it still operates the same way today. Stephens Inc., is noted for handling the IPO of Wal-Mart Stores in 1970.

Stephens began work as an associate in the corporate finance department, concentrating on oil and gas. He became head of the department in 1983 and spent a lot of time on mergers and acquisitions. On February 18, 1986, Stephens was appointed president and CEO of Stephens Inc.

In 1990, he was the senior advisor to Tyson Foods in its acquisition of Holly Farms in a nine-month takeover battle. He is only the third chairman, president and CEO in the firm's more than 90 years of operations since 1933.

In 2006, Stephens acquired 100 percent of the outstanding shares of Stephens Inc., from the other family members.

Stephens is on the board of Dillard's.

In January 2025, Warren Stephens revealed his decision to step down from his role as CEO of Stephens Inc., to prepare to assume the position of U.S. ambassador to the United Kingdom. His sons, Miles and John Stephens, have been named co-CEOs, representing the third generation of family leadership at the firm.

== Political involvement and government service ==
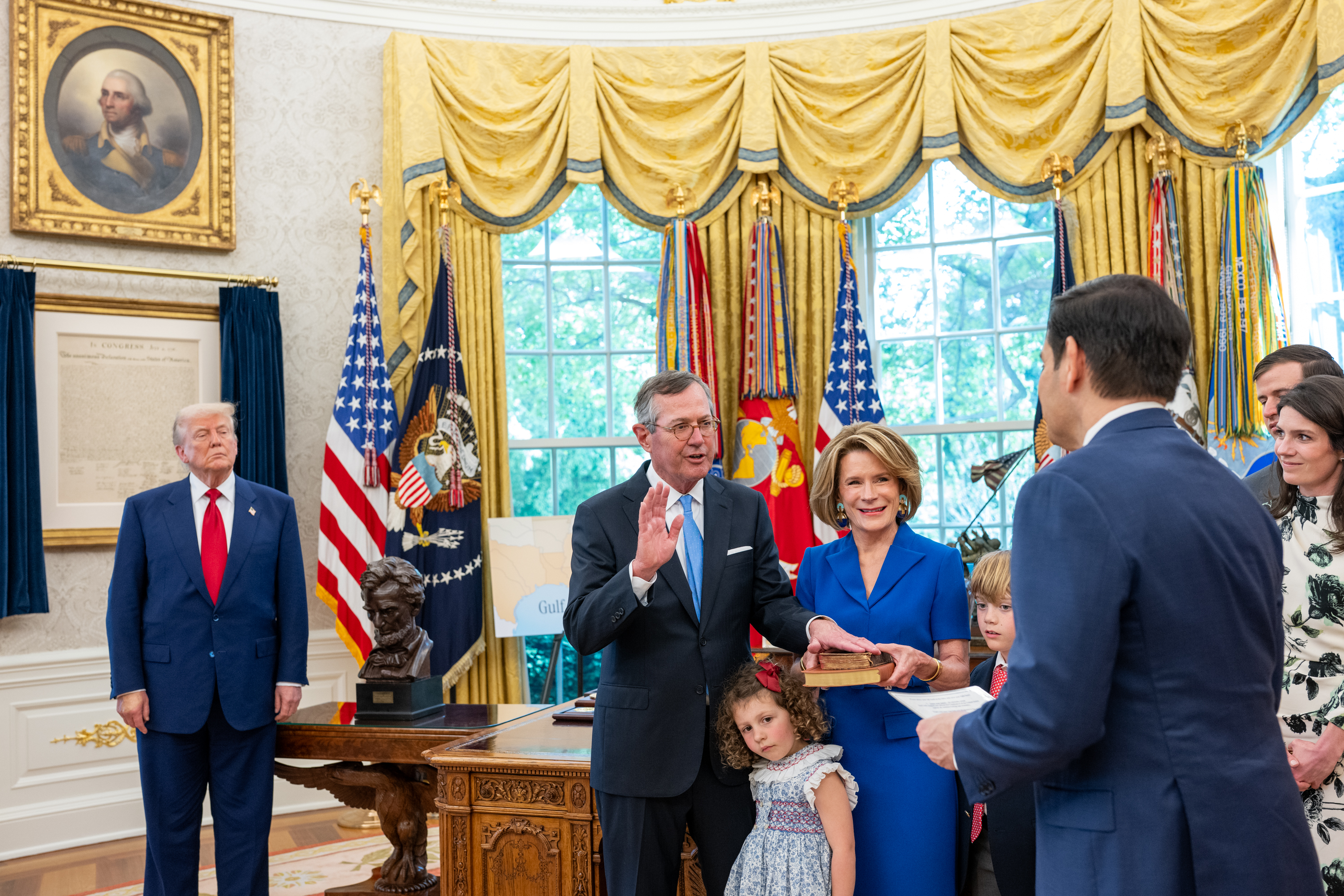
Stephens being sworn in as the United States ambassador to the United Kingdom, April 2025

A Republican, he supported Bob Dole in 1996, Steve Forbes in 1999, and has supported Mike Huckabee. Stephens was a bundler for Mitt Romney in 2012. He has been critical of presidents Bill Clinton and Barack Obama. During the 2020 presidential election, Stephens donated more than $3 million to super PACs supporting Trump. In the 2024 Republican presidential primaries, Stephens was a major financial backer of Asa Hutchinson and Nikki Haley. During the 2024 presidential campaign, Stephens also contributed to MAGA Inc., a super PAC that supported Donald Trump, donating a further $1 million during the first half of 2025.

Stephens has been listed as the largest single donor to the Trump 2025 inauguration, gifting four million dollars, twice the amount of the three next largest donors. From 1989 to 2024, the investment banker contributed more than 77-million dollars to Republican candidates, 111 thousand to Democrat or Liberal candidates.

On December 2, 2024, President-elect Donald Trump announced his intent to nominate Stephens to serve as the United States ambassador to the United Kingdom in his second administration. At the time, Stephens had donated $6 million to Trump. On February 12, 2025, his nomination was sent to the Senate. His nomination was confirmed with a vote of 59–39 on April 29, 2025. He presented his credentials to King Charles III on May 21, 2025, at Buckingham Palace. In June 2026, he appeared at the American Museum and Gardens in Bath, England to commemorate the United States Semiquincentennial.

== Philanthropy ==
Stephens was on the board of trustees of his alma mater, Washington and Lee University. Stephens and his wife Harriet are benefactors of various organizations, most notably the Episcopal Collegiate School and the Arkansas Arts Center, both in Little Rock.

== Leisure ==
Stephens built The Alotian Club golf course, opening in 2004, and overlooking Lake Maumelle in Arkansas. The club was designed by Tom Fazio and rated the #37 best course in the United States by Golf Digest in 2025. He contributed land and financing for the creation of minor-league baseball stadium Dickey-Stephens Park in North Little Rock, opened in 2007 and bearing his family's namesake.

Business positions
Preceded by Jackson T. Stephens	President and CEO of Stephens Inc. 1986–2025	Succeeded by Miles Stephens; John Stephens
Diplomatic posts
Preceded by Jane D. Hartley	United States Ambassador to the United Kingdom; 2025-present	Incumbent
