= GL Trade =

GL Trade was a French provider of financial order management and trading systems that covered front office, middle office and back office used by international financial institutions. Its main products were real-time market data and trading systems (servers and front end applications); a major part of its success was the GL NET private network linking up exchanges all over the world with thousands of brokers and traders. The company was purchased by SunGard in 2009 and the system was renamed as SunGard Global Trading.

== History ==
GL services financiers sarl was first established by Louis christophe Laurent, and Bernard Grouchko and Jean-luc Wibaux in May 1987 to enter the Paris Stock options market opening September 87. Three months after bernard Grouchko left the company. Soon after Pierre Gatignol entered the company. GLTrade was established in 1990 with Jean Luc Wibaux as CEO. Due to the company's founders Pierre Gatignol and Louis-Christophe Laurent the acronym GL has been kept.In 1992 SBF Société des Bourses Françaises (ex Euronext) headed by Mr Theodore decided to buy 51% for strategic matters. But in 1998 35% of the company is sold to Reuters before listing the company on the Paris stock exchange. In 2009 GL trade was acquired by US based SunGard, one of the world's leading software and technology services companies.
The GL Trade shares were distributed as follows: NYSE Euronext owned approx. 40%, in the hand of the founders were 25,4% and 36,6% of the shares were free floating.

In May 2008 SunGard announced to acquire GL Trade by purchasing 65% in a first tranche for US$625 Million, including effect of outstanding stock options.

In accordance to the AMF General Regulation, Paris-based Oddo Corporate Finance launched on SunGard's behalf an all-cash tender offer for the remainder of GL Trade's share capital at the original price of EUR 41.70 per share. The price per share did not reflect the overall decay of worldwide corporate's values according to the 2008 Financial Crisis impact. Thus the total deal value of nearly US$1 Billion was considered to be financially hazardous, given the mere fact that GL Trade reported revenues of EUR 203 Million and an EBITDA of EUR 26 Million (fiscal year 2007).
