= Arkansas Policy Foundation =

American conservative think tank

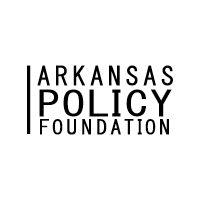
- Established: 1995
- Executive Director: Greg Kaza
- Budget: Revenue: $119,000; Expenses: $119,000 (FYE December 2024)
- Address: 111 Center Street Suite 1200 Little Rock, AR 72201
- Location: Little Rock, Arkansas
- Coordinates: 34.7478°N 92.2724°W
- Interactive map of Arkansas Policy Foundation
- Website: www.arkansaspolicyfoundation.org

The Arkansas Policy Foundation (APF) is a conservative think tank based in Little Rock, Arkansas. According to APF, the organization "emphasizes the importance of tax policy and education reform."

== Activities ==
From 1996-1999, APF crafted a detailed review of state government known as the Murphy Commission report. The organization has issued recommendations on education reform, ethics reform, and health care. It has proposed tax and spending cuts, including a reduction in sales taxes applied to groceries. In December 2015, Arkansas Governor Asa Hutchinson requested that APF conduct another efficiency review in order to take a statewide look at governmental efficiency.

== See also ==
- Advance Arkansas Institute
