= Check verification service =

Service to verify the validity of checks

A check verification service provides businesses or individuals with either the ability to check the validity of the actual check or draft being presented, or the ability to verify the history of the account holder, or both.

There are a number of different methods that can be used to provide the service, these include checking different databases with negative or account history, checking that routing and account numbers are valid using algorithms, or contacting the bank that issued the check to get confirmation about the account status.

== Business ==
Check verification services have been most common in the United States, in Europe a cheque guarantee system operated for a number of years that could be used by merchants until the usage of cheques declined to the point where it was no longer necessary. Outside the United States the decline in check usage in favour of debit cards and credit cards has meant that cheques are rarely accepted by merchants thus rendering cheque verification services obsolete. In the United States, there are a number of third-party companies that provide check verification services.

Some banks bundle a level of this service with a business checking account or with a bank credit card acceptance program. Check verification companies will often offer one, two, or all of the different services in their own system. Some check verification services also offer collection agency service for the civil prosecution of check fraud.

== Verification methods ==
Check verification services can use a number of different methods or may combine a number to verify the validity of a check.

=== Negative check database ===
A negative check database contains a comprehensive list of people who either wrote a bad check at a retail location, or paid a bill with a check that was returned, also called "bouncing a check".

Historical data check verification services that use a national network with a negative check database can be difficult for consumers and businesses to remove themselves from once they get on, even in the case of errors.

These databases are often bundled with "check guarantee" services like ChexSystems. This leaves companies that use historical data reliant systems in a position of sometimes denying customers that have a valid check, but managed to get on the negative check database.

This type of verification is usually linked to the person writing the check and runs the verification using their driver's license number. This type of information is a valuable tool for loss prevention because it identifies historically or habitual check bouncers who are more likely to re-offend. Negative check database systems can cause customer service issues between retailers and their own customers, because there is no limit to the time period that is considered.

=== Account history database ===
The account history database offers a database with historical data on the account itself, and not just the person writing the check. This type of system keeps records of the account number for all checks that don't clear and can tell if that particular checking account has had returns in the past.

Because this type of system is based on the history of all checks written against the account, it can provide valuable information, just like the negative check database except the information is not based on the identity of the person writing the check.

This is particularly valuable for taking business checks or company checks because often the identity of the person writing the check has little to do with the company check. In the account history database, a good account with no flags would receive full approval, regardless of the status of the employee who writes the check because identity is not verified.

=== Account current status verification ===
There is also a checking account validation network that can poll the results of the actual bank account to get the current status from the bank. Newer systems provide a result that is based on the bank account's actual status provided by the bank as of that business banking day are increasing in popularity for companies that take checks by phone, manage monthly check payments, or automatic billing with bank drafts, or who process ACH transactions received by phone or for monthly billing.

Account status verification systems give you the status of the account as of the beginning of the business banking day. They tell you if there is an open active account at that bank and if the check is likely to clear. Status messages such as closed account, NSF, stop payment or invalid account can help determine if a check or ACH transaction will be good.

The results are based on account validity, so there is no way to know if the check will actually clear when it is presented, or if the exact dollar amount is going to be available.

This type of system is used less at retail establishments, and more for companies that do checks by phone sales, monthly check drafting, monthly billing via ACH and online sales. It reduces the number of bad payments that are deposited due to human error, fraud or account status.

=== Merchant funds verification ===
Often called "verifying funds" or "merchant funds verification", it was common practice until the mid-2000s that any business or individual could call the bank where the check was drawn and ask for check verification. The bank would ask for the account number, the name on the check, the amount and the check number and just look up the account.

Due to banks issuing privacy policies designed to protect identity and fraud, telephone merchant funds verification by calling the bank directly is now rare for any bank or credit union to offer this service.

Some banks still offer merchant funds verification, while others are limiting the information they will provide to telling you if the account is open with a positive balance, only.

Other banks provide this service as a pay-per-call, or offer bank validation for a fee. The majority of banks do not provide any direct telephone account verification.

=== Routing number verification ===
Yet another form of check verification is to cross reference the ABA routing transit number, also called the Routing Number or ABA Number, with the bank to check against the actual item being presented. The routing number verification can provide the bank's name, address for processing, and phone number.

Some routing number verification systems use an algorithm to validate the routing number, rather than cross reference the results in a database.

Routing number verification is limited to verifying the bank name, address and phone number and cannot determine if the checking account is valid of perform funds verification. It can be valuable in locating fraudulent checks or drafts, and in getting contact information for the bank for merchant funds verification or account validation. Using the bank phone number, a business can attempt merchant funds verification if the bank offers the service.

== See also ==
- ACH Network
- Cheque guarantee card
