= Worldpay, Inc. =

American payment processing company

Worldpay
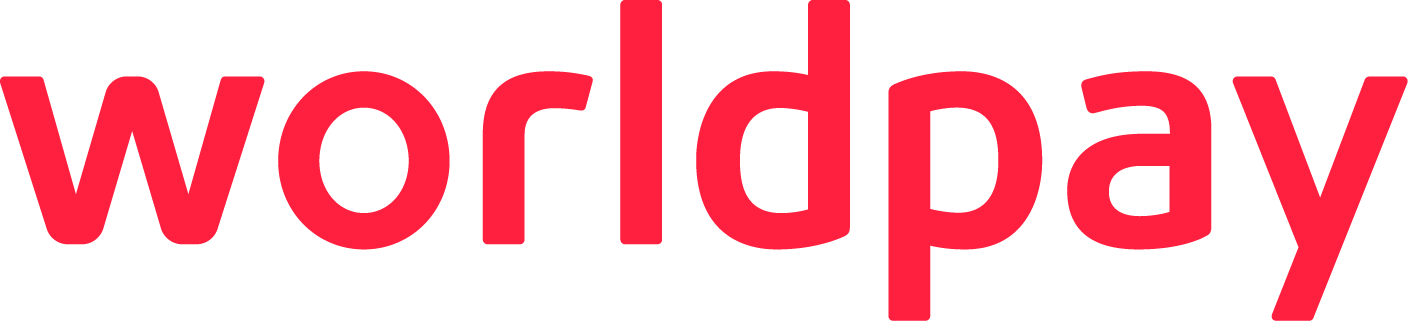

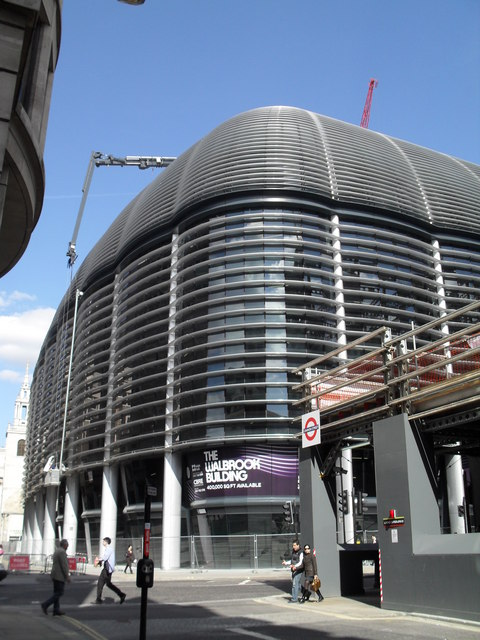
- Worldpay international headquarters at The Walbrook Building in London
- Formerly: Midwest Payment Systems (1971–2003); Fifth Third Processing Solutions (2003–2011); Vantiv (2011–2018)
- Type: Privately held company
- Traded as: NYSE: VNTV (2012-2018)
- Industry: Financial services, Merchant services, Technology, Payment processor
- Founded: 1971; 55 years ago
- Headquarters: Cincinnati, Ohio, United States
- Key people: Charles Drucker (CEO)
- Revenue: US$4.9 billion (2023)
- Owner: Global Payments
- Number of employees: 8,500 (2024)
- Website: www.worldpay.com

Worldpay is an American multinational financial technology company and payment processing company. It provides payment and technology services to merchants and financial institutions globally generating 40 billion transactions across 146 countries and 135 currencies.

With $4.9 billion in revenue in 2023 and 8,500 employees, Worldpay ranks as one of the largest non-bank merchant acquirers in the world processing $2.2 trillion in transactions annually. Based in Cincinnati, Ohio, it has its international headquarters in London and 40 offices across 25 countries.

On January 12, 2026, Global Payments announced it had completed the acquisition of Worldpay. Before then, this company was co-owned by GTCR and FIS, which held 55% and 45% ownership interests, respectively.

== History ==
In 1971, Fifth Third Bank formed Midwest Payment Systems (MPS) to provide Electronic Funds Transfer (EFT) services to financial institutions. In 1977, Jeanie, the nation's first shared online ATM network was developed and implemented.

In 2000, nine years after expanding to offer Merchant Services, MPS acquired Integrated Delivery Technologies, Inc. (IDTI), Cartel Network and ACI Merchant Services. In 2003, MPS adopted the name Fifth Third Processing Solutions.

In 2006, the firm acquired Card Management Corporation (CMC) to provide a broader range of processing services. Several years later, in 2009, Fifth Third Processing Solutions spun off from Fifth Third Bancorp and was launched as a joint venture between Advent International and Fifth Third Bank, a subsidiary of Fifth Third Bancorp.

By the end of 2010, the company had acquired TNB Card Services, National Processing Company (NPC) and certain assets of Springbok Services, Inc. Prepaid Platform. In June 2011, Fifth Third Processing Solutions assumed the Vantiv name.

The company adopted the name "Vantiv" in June 2011 as a step towards becoming a public company. Previously a joint venture between Advent International and Fifth Third Bancorp, Vantiv became a publicly traded company on March 22, 2012, listed on the NYSE under the ticker symbol "VNTV".

In December 2012, Vantiv acquired privately held Litle & Co. for $361 million. Litle develops e-commerce payment processing solutions that are used by companies that accept payments for goods and services online, via phone, and via mail. Vantiv said it would integrate Litle's technologies into its point-of-sale and e-commerce processing offerings.

In April 2013, Vantiv became the first U.S. acquirer to complete MasterCard's testing requirements to process EMV transactions for MasterCard, Maestro and Cirrus brands at both ATM and at the point-of-sale locations. In July, Vantiv agreed to buy Element Payment Services, a provider of fully integrated PCI DSS compliant payment processing solutions for merchants and business management software providers.

On May 12, 2014, Vantiv confirmed a $1.65 billion acquisition of Mercury Payment Systems LLC. In November 2016, it acquired the US operations of Canadian payment processor Moneris Solutions.

In July 2017, the company announced its intention to acquire British-based Worldpay for $10.4 billion. Subsequent announcements have indicated that the combined entity will be named "Worldpay Inc." headquartered and listed in the United States, but internal operations will be based in the U.K.

On January 16, 2018, upon completing the purchase of the British firm, it changed its name to Worldpay, Inc. On July 1, it acquired Pazien, a US payments data platform startup that Worldpay Group plc first invested in on May 14, 2014.

In March 2019, FIS announced a $43 billion deal to buy Worldpay, reported as the biggest deal ever in the international payments sector; after the deal was completed in June, Worldpay merged with FIS. In November 2020, WorldPay expands into Argentina by securing domestic card scheme acquiring licenses in Argentina.

In February 2023, in the wake of pressure from activist investors, FIS announced it would spin off its merchant business that consisted of Worldpay in the next 12 months. In July, private equity firm GTCR agreed to acquire a 55% stake in WorldPay from FIS for $11.7 billion, valuing WorldPay at $18.5 billion.

In February 2024, the Cincinnati-based firm was separated from FIS and became an independent company again, although it remained co-owned by GTCR (55%) and FIS (45%). In April 2025, Global Payments agreed to buy Worldpay for $22 billion.

In January 2026, following regulatory approvals in multiple jurisdictions, it was announced that Global Payments had completed the transaction, whose final value is estimated to have been $24.25 billion.

== Solutions ==
Worldpay's portfolio includes solutions to help customers make, take, and manage payments. These solutions are tailored for various platform, business owner, and enterprise needs.

In May 2024 Worldpay released a tap to pay feature on iPhone enabling merchants to securely accept contactless payments including contactless credit and debit cards, Apple Pay and other digital wallets.

== Financial institution relationships ==
Worldpay works with financial institutions to develop programs and tools to simplify payment strategies. The company's financial products include credit cards, ATM processing, merchant services, rewards and fraud prevention. Additionally, Worldpay assists financial institutions with pre-paid and gift cards, card personalization, debit PIN processing, cardholder eServices and more.

Worldpay provides payment strategies and technologies to over 1,400 financial institutions, including more than 700 credit unions throughout the U.S., supporting over 33 million debit cards and processing more than 15.7 billion transactions each year.
