= Metavante =

Former financial technology company

Metavante Corporation
- Company type: Subsidiary of Fidelity National Information Services
- Traded as: NYSE: MV
- Industry: Finance
- Founded: 1996 (Marshall & Ilsley Corporation), Formerly M&I Data Services (1964)
- Headquarters: Brown Deer, Wisconsin, United States
- Key people: Frank Martire - Chairman of the Board and CEO; Michael Hayford - President and COO; Timothy Oliver - CFO
- Products: Financial services
- Revenue: $1.707 Billion USD (2008)
- Net income: ▲$147.4 Million USD (2008)
- Number of employees: 5,900 (2008)

Metavante Technologies, Inc., through its subsidiary, Metavante Corporation, provided financial technology services, software and financial services regulatory advice and consulting to its customers, consisting primarily of small to large sized financial institutions. The $1.5 billion organization was headquartered in Milwaukee, Wisconsin, and employed over 5,600 employees in 35 U.S. cities. On October 1, 2009, Metavante was acquired by Fidelity National Information Services.

== History ==
Metavante corporation was originally formed as M&I Data Services in 1964 as a subsidiary of the Marshall & Ilsley Corporation (NYSE: MI). The company established the first Remote Banking operation in the United States in 1967. In 2000 M&I Data Services changed its name to Metavante.

On 3 April 2007, Marshall & Ilsley Corporation announced its plan to split Marshall & Ilsley Corporation and Metavante Corporation into independent publicly traded companies, as Marshall & Ilsley relinquished a portion of its interest to an investment firm, Warburg Pincus, a move approved by M&I Corporation Shareholders on October 25 of the same year.

Under the investment agreement, Warburg Pincus agreed to invest $625 million to acquire an equity stake of 25 percent in Metavante Corporation. Marshall & Ilsley Corporation shareholders retained 75 percent of the shares of Metavante Corporation. The plan was implemented through the spin-off of Marshall & Ilsley Corporation and was designed to be tax-free to Marshall & Ilsley Corporation and its shareholders. As part of the plan, approximately $1.75 billion of new Metavante Corporation debt would be arranged by J.P. Morgan Securities Inc. and Morgan Stanley. Metavante Technologies, Inc. began trading on the New York Stock Exchange as an independent publicly traded company on November 1, 2007, under the symbol "MV." The new company had approximately 5,500 employees, and was under the same management as previously, with Frank Martire continuing as president and CEO, and Mike Hayford remaining senior executive vice president and chief operating officer. Upon completion of the transaction, Marshall & Ilsley Corporation shareholders receive one share of Marshall & Ilsley Corporation stock and a further share of Metavante Corporation stock for every three shares of Marshall & Ilsley Corporation stock held.

Metavante products and services drive account processing for deposit, loan and trust systems, image-based and conventional check processing, electronic funds transfer, consumer healthcare payments, and electronic presentment and payment.

The company may be best known for its role in ATM network development having hosted the first successful ATM transaction over a shared network known as "TYME" or "Take Your Money Everywhere". Other products offered by the company are core data processing for financial institutions, online banking products, credit card and debit card processing, and manufacture and network infrastructure support.

Metavante made several acquisitions in the following years including the NYCE Payments Network, VICOR, Inc. (Receivables Information Delivery System (RIDS) Lockbox), VECTORsgi, Advanced Financial Solutions(AFS), GHR, The Kirchman Corporation, Link2Gov, pay1040.com, 401kservices.com, Printing for Systems Inc, Cyberbills and Endpoint Exchange, among others.

On April 1, 2009, Metavante Technologies, Inc. announced it would itself be acquired by Fidelity National Information Services (NYSE: FIS). The acquisition was completed on October 1.
