= Cheque guarantee card =

Card guaranteeing payment of an accompanying cheque

Logo of the United Kingdom domestic cheque guarantee card scheme since 1990

A cheque guarantee card or check guarantee card (American English) was an abbreviated portable letter of credit granted by a bank to a qualified depositor in the form of a plastic card that was used in conjunction with a cheque. Many ATM cards and some credit cards could also be used as cheque guarantee cards.

The scheme provided retailers accepting cheques with greater security. The retailer would write the card number on the back of the cheque, which was signed in the retailer's presence, and the retailer verified the signature on the cheque against the signature on the card. In North America, where cheque guarantee cards were less common, merchants alternately often required customers presenting cheques for payment to provide photo identification and a secondary form of identification such as a credit card for them to be accepted.

The cheque could not be stopped and payment could not be refused by the bank. Each bank would set a limit on the maximum amount of an individual cheque that could be guaranteed. The guarantee only applied to cheques drawn on an account provided by the bank that issued the card, and could result in an overdraft with penalty interest on the cardholder.

After the introduction of debit cards and widespread deployment starting in the 1990s, there was a rapid decline in the use of cheques and of cheque guarantee cards, and these facilities were generally phased out during the 2000s in the countries that operated them. The Irish cheque guarantee scheme officially ended on 31 December 2011, ending the last such scheme in existence.

== History ==
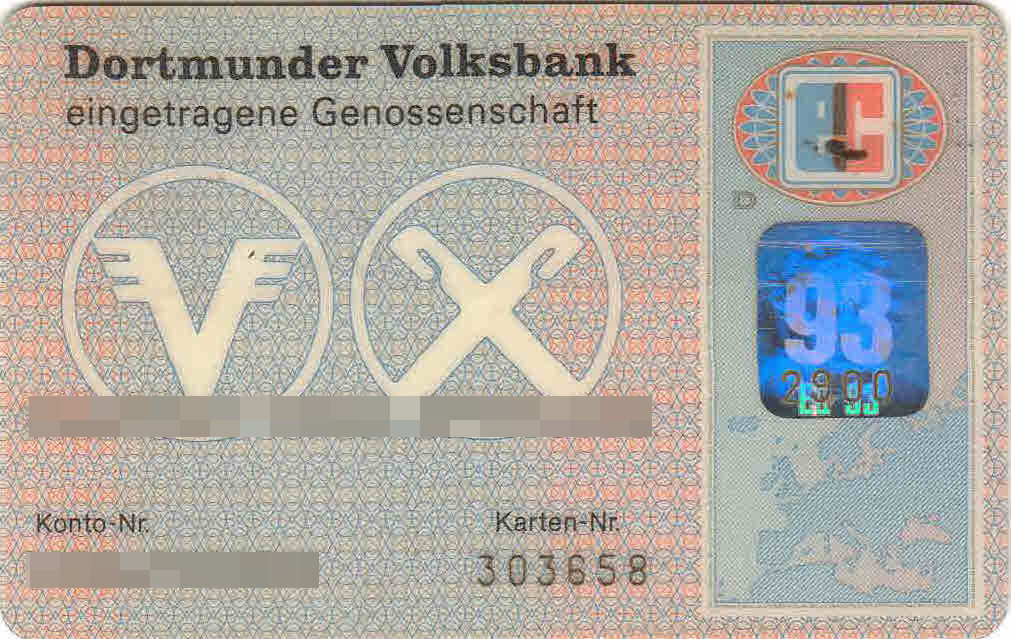
Eurocheque guarantee card issued by Dortmunder Volksbank till 1993

The first cheque guarantee card scheme was introduced in the United Kingdom in 1965.

When ATMs started to be rolled out during the 1980s, ATM cards could also be used as cheque guarantee cards. Usage of the cheque guarantee scheme declined significantly during the 1990s with the introduction and wide use of debit cards.

In 2001, with the abolition of Eurocheques in Germany and other European countries, the cheque guarantee scheme also ended in those countries, and many retailers stopped accepting cheques altogether. In 2011, after many years of decline, the Payments Council ended the UK cheque guarantee system, leaving Ireland as the last country to operate a cheque guarantee card scheme.

The Irish Paper Clearing Company Limited officially ended the Irish scheme on 31 December 2011, bringing the last such scheme to an end.

=== Ireland ===
Between 2007 and 2010, cheque usage decreased by 30%. As of 2010, there were 1.4 million valid cheque guarantee cards in Ireland; however, just 45% of debit cards and 39% of ATM cards also performed the cheque guarantee function. The Irish cheque guarantee scheme covered sums of up to €130 per cheque. In 2010, the average amount of a written cheque was €5,000, and only 1.5% of all cheques were backed by a guarantee card. In the light of these statistics, the Irish Paper Clearing Company announced in December 2010 that the Ireland cheque guarantee card scheme would cease on 31 December 2011.

=== United Kingdom ===
In the United Kingdom the scheme was first tested in 1965 and fully introduced in 1969, with a limit of £30. The limit was increased to £50 in 1977 and then to £100 or £250, at the bank's discretion, in 1989. As of 2009 the scheme was only used to guarantee 7% of the 1.4 billion cheques issued each year, a figure which itself was declining due to the popularity of other means of payment such as debit cards. The Payments Council therefore announced a decision in September 2009 to withdraw the cheque guarantee scheme on 30 June 2011, and the scheme was closed.

== See also ==
- Check verification service
- Overdraft protection
- Check card
