= Connectivity exchange =

Radio network process

Connectivity exchange (CONEX): In an adaptive or manually operated high-frequency (HF) radio network, the automatic or manual exchange of information concerning routes to stations that are not directly reachable by the exchange originator.

The purpose of the exchange is to identify indirect paths and/or possible relay stations to those stations that are not directly reachable.
