= EFunds Corporation =

Former financial services company

EFD
- Formerly: eFunds Corporation
- Type: Subsidiary (since 2007)
- Industry: Financial services, electronic funds transfer, retail
- Founded: 1999 (27 years ago) in Minneapolis, Minnesota, USA
- Defunct: September 12, 2007
- Fate: Acquired by FIS
- Headquarters: Scottsdale, Arizona, USA
- Key people: Gus Blanchard, CEO; Debra Janssen, CEO; Paul Walsh, CEO; Frank Martire, CEO; Gary A Norcross, CEO; Stephaine Ferris, CEO
- Products: AO Smith; Deluxe Data; EFD Connex on IBM built in 1975; EFD Connex on HP built in 1981 (also known Connex Advantage); EFD DataNavigator; EFD FraudNavigator; EFD ChexSystems; EFD DebitBureau; v3.0 Settlement - IBM based backend Settlement System; ebtEDGE - EBT processing system; PPS - Prepaid South card issuing platform; IST switch, All Card, Clearing, MAS - acquired as a part of Oasis Technologies, Canada
- Revenue: ▲$552.4 million USD (2006)
- Number of employees: 5,000
- Subsidiaries: ChexSystems
- Website: www.efunds.com

EFD (or eFunds Corporation) was a Scottsdale, Arizona based payments processor of electronic payments including debit card and automated teller machine (ATM) transactions. It provided financial service companies and other large enterprises with new account decisions, fraud detection and payment processing services. On June 27, 2007, Fidelity National Information Services, Inc. (FIS) announced that it was acquiring EFD in an all-cash transaction valued at about $1.8B. The target completion date for the acquisition was the 3rd quarter of 2007.

== Company history ==
EFD was formed as eFunds Corporation in 1999 as a spin-off from Deluxe Corporation, bringing together established players in financial risk management and electronic transaction processing services; previously distinct businesses within Deluxe.

In January 2000, iDLX Technology Partners, another Deluxe unit, combined with eFunds to add professional services and business process outsourcing capabilities to the new business. In June 2000, eFunds held its initial public offering on the NASDAQ national market and later that year completed its separation from Deluxe.

In March 2007, eFunds Corporation announced its transition to its new corporate brand, EFD.

== EFD/eFunds International ==
Based primarily in the US, EFD/eFunds International Limited extends EFD's services beyond North America. In India, eFunds employs more than 5,000 employees in its Software Development, BPO and IT services operations in Mumbai, Gurgaon and Chennai. The company has been ranked among the top three BPO providers in the country.

== See also ==
- ChexSystems
