= Worldpay Group =

British payment processing company

Worldpay
- Company type: Subsidiary
- Industry: Electronic payment services
- Predecessor: Streamline 1989; WorldPay 1997
- Founded: 1989 (as Streamline)
- Fate: Acquired by FIS to form in WorldPay, Inc. 2019
- Headquarters: London, United Kingdom
- Key people: Charles Drucker CEO; Sir Michael Rake (Former Chairman); Philip Jansen (Former CEO); Ron Kalifa OBE (Vice Chairman and former CEO)
- Services: Payment Services, Payment gateway
- Revenue: £4.5408 billion (2016)
- Operating income: £389.2 million (2016)
- Net income: £131.5 million (2016)
- Number of employees: 5,000 (2017)
- Parent: Worldpay, Inc.
- Website: www.worldpay.com

Worldpay Group plc (formerly RBS WorldPay) was a payment processing company. It was formerly listed on the London Stock Exchange until 16 January 2018 when it was acquired by Vantiv. The combined company then took the name Worldpay, Inc. Worldpay, Inc. was acquired by FIS in July 2019 for $43 billion. In 2024, private-equity firm GTCR acquired a majority 55% equity interest in Worldpay.

== History ==
=== Early history ===
WorldPay started as an online multi-currency payment system in 1997. The founder Nick Ogden partnered with National Westminster Bank to provide the financial systems and Andrew Birch of Symbiant to provide the end user payment gateway. When Royal Bank of Scotland took over National Westminster Bank, Worldpay was wholly acquired and merged with an electronic payment system called Streamline which was first released by Centre-file ltd, a wholly owned subsidiary of National Westminster Bank, in 1989.

=== Management history ===
==== RBS ownership ====
In 1995 the Streamline system was reabsorbed into the bank when the trading name and payroll service of Centre-file ltd were sold to Ceridian. NatWest was acquired in 2002 by Royal Bank of Scotland Group (RBS) which renamed the business RBS WorldPay and appointed Ron Kalifa as CEO. RBS expanded the business significantly by acquiring and merging a number of payment solutions companies from different countries. Over the next five years it was combined with seven leading retail payment solutions brands: Streamline, Streamline International, PaymentTrust, Netherlands based Bibit, RiskGuardian and US-based Lynk.

==== Divestment from RBS ====
As a condition in the European Commission's clearance in December 2009 of state aid to RBS, Worldpay was to be sold as part of a plan to divest selected businesses from the group. On 6 August 2010, Advent International and Bain Capital agreed to acquire Worldpay for £2.025bn, including a £200m contingent consideration, and appointed Ron Kalifa, who had previously headed up the global transaction services division with RBS, as CEO. The RBS Group retained a 20% stake in the newly independent business, with Advent International and Bain Capital owning 40% each. The sale completed on 1 December 2010.

In November 2013, RBS said it had sold its remaining stake of about 20 per cent in Worldpay to the payment processing firm’s majority shareholders, private equity firms Advent International and Bain Capital. The company listed on the London Stock Exchange through an initial public offering (IPO) in October 2015. At the IPO, Advent and Bain earned a combined profit of £3.2 billion from their five year investment, selling about £1.2 billion of company stock and retaining a £2.3 billion stake.

==== Acquired by Vantiv ====
In July 2017, Vantiv announced its intention to acquire Worldpay for $10.4 billion. The combined entity was to keep the "Worldpay" name, and would be headquartered and listed in the United States, with internal operations continuing to be based in the U.K. The transaction was completed on 16 January 2018. There was initial concern from UK politicians over whether the merger was as a result of the fall in the pound's value since 2016, turning British assets into bargains for foreign investors. However, WorldPay's vice-chair, Ron Kalifa, described the deal as "a merger of equals" and emphasised that the timing was simply coincidental, as the company was "not ready [to do the deal] last year when the pound was in a different position.". The combined entity renamed to Worldpay, Inc.

==== Acquired by FIS ====
In March 2019, Fidelity National Information Services (FIS), a payment rival based in Florida, bought Worldpay Inc. in a deal worth £32 billion.

==== Divestment from FIS ====
In February 2023, in the wake of pressure from activist investors, FIS announced it would spin off its merchant business that consisted of Worldpay in the next 12 months. In July, private equity firm GTCR agreed to acquire a 55 per cent stake in WorldPay from FIS for $11.7 billion, valuing WorldPay at $18.5 billion.

== Acquisitions ==
On 21 December 2010, the UK division of Worldpay acquired Cardsave, one of the leading independent sales organisations distributing credit and debit card processing services to small retailers.

In May 2011 Worldpay acquired Envoy Services Limited, a leading provider of alternative payment solutions to eCommerce merchants worldwide, for an undisclosed amount.

In June 2013, Worldpay launched Worldpay Zinc, a mobile card processing terminal which connects to smart phones.

In September 2013, Worldpay revealed it had acquired US payment processing company Century Payments.

In 2014, Worldpay announced a definitive agreement to acquire SecureNet Payment Systems from private equity firm Sterling Partners. The acquisition was completed in December of that year. Following this acquisition, Worldpay announced that it would spend $10 million relocating its US headquarters to Atlanta.

== Operations ==
The company provided payment services for mail order and Internet retailers, as well as point of sale transactions. Customers are a mix of multinational, multichannel retailers, with the majority being small business merchants. It also provided loans to small businesses through a partnership with Liberis, using card transaction data to underwrite financing for SMEs.

In 2016, WorldPay presented its own IT platform, which enabled the company to process up to 20 times more transactions. This decision was a part of the process to separate WorldPay entirely from the Royal Bank of Scotland and their technology systems.

== See also ==
- Electronic commerce
- Payment gateway
- Payment processor
- Payment service provider
