= Fidelity National Financial =

American financial services company

Fidelity National Financial, Inc.

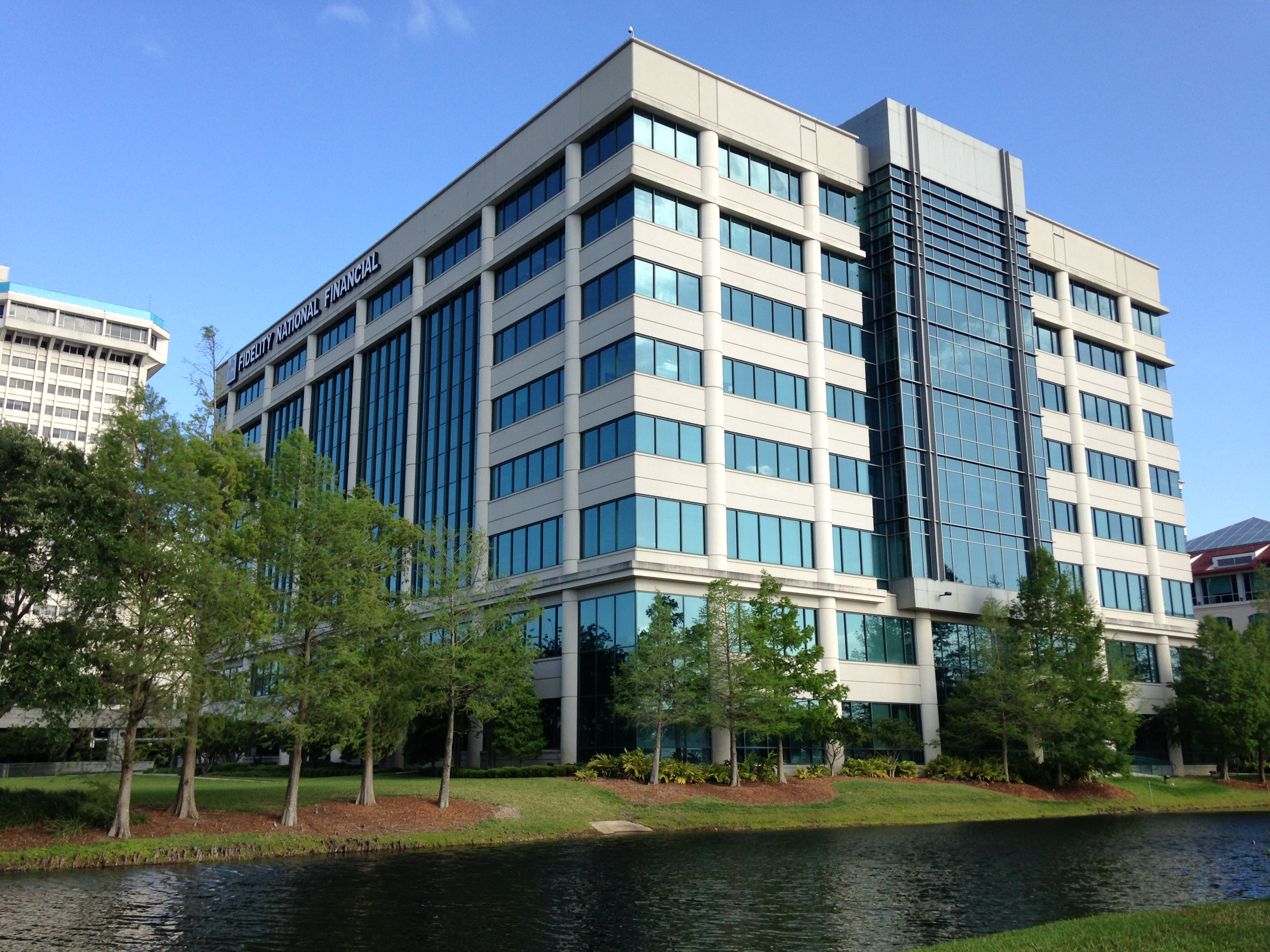
- Fidelity National Financial corporate headquarters
- Type: Public company
- Traded as: NYSE: FNF; S&P 400 component
- ISIN: US31620R3030
- Industry: Financial Sector
- Founded: 1847; 179 years ago
- Headquarters: Jacksonville, Florida, U.S.
- Key people: William P. Foley II - Chairman of the Board; Mike Nolan - CEO; Michael J. Nolan - President; Roger Jewkes - Chief Operating Officer; Anthony J. Park - Chief Financial Officer
- Products: Title insurance, mortgage services & other diversified services
- Revenue: 11,556,000,000 United States dollar (2022)
- Net income: 1,136,000,000 United States dollar (2022)
- Number of employees: 23,100
- Website: www.fnf.com

Fidelity National Financial, Inc. (NYSE: FNF), is an American provider of title insurance and settlement services to the real estate and mortgage industries. A Fortune 500 company, Fidelity National Financial generated approximately $8.469 billion in annual revenue in 2019 from its title and real estate-related operations. The company was the first instance of an attorney licensed by a Native American Tribe being certified as "authorized house counsel" in the state of Florida.

== See also ==
- Fidelity National Information Services (currently unaffiliated with Fidelity National Financial, Inc.)
