= FIS (company) =

American information technology company

Fidelity National Information Services, Inc.
- Trade name: FIS
- Type: Public
- Traded as: NYSE: FIS; S&P 500 component
- Industry: Financial technology
- Predecessor: Systematics, Inc
- Founded: 1968 (58 years ago)
- Headquarters: Jacksonville, Florida, U.S.
- Area served: Worldwide
- Key people: Stephanie Ferris (CEO & President); Jeffrey A. Goldstein (Chairman)
- Products: Banking Technology, Payment Technology, Processing Services, Information-based services
- Revenue: ▲US$10.7 billion (2025)
- Net income: ▼US$382 million (2025)
- Total assets: ▼US$33.5 billion (2025)
- Total equity: ▼US$13.9 billion (2025)
- Number of employees: 50,000+ (2024)
- Website: fisglobal.com

Fidelity National Information Services, Inc. (FIS) is an American financial technology company headquarterd in Jacksonville, Florida, which focuses on core banking, payments and capital markets. Annually, FIS facilitates the movement of roughly US$9 trillion through the processing of approximately 75 billion transactions in service to more than 20,000 clients around the globe.

The company was founded as Systematics in 1968. It is publicly traded as FIS. FIS was ranked second in the FinTech Forward 2016 rankings. After acquiring Worldpay for $35 billion in Q3 of 2019, FIS became the largest processing and payments company in the world.

== History ==
The company was founded in Little Rock in 1968 as Systematics, which was later acquired by ALLTEL Information Services as its Financial Services division. Alltell then sold this division to title insurance giant Fidelity National Financial in 2003, who renamed it Fidelity Information Services (FIS).

Throughout its history, FIS expanded through a number of acquisitions, including Certegy, eFunds Corporation, Metavante Technologies and SunGard. It acquired Worldpay in 2019, sold a majority interest in 2024, and sold its remaining ownership interest in January 2026. In January 2026, FIS acquired Global Payments' Issuer Solutions business, formerly known as TSYS, for approximately $13.5 billion.

== Operations ==
FIS provides technology and processing services to banks, businesses and capital markets organizations. Its services include core banking, payments, card issuing and processing, lending and capital markets technology.

FIS has a portfolio of products for the financial services sector, including both retail and investment banking. They include "Profile"―a banking application based on the open source GT.M, a transaction processing database engine maintained by FIS.

== Mergers, acquisitions and divestments ==
Throughout its history, FIS has made many acquisitions. Its largest, a proposed merger with Global Payments, was reported as being worth US$70 billion of combined enterprise value. Discussions about the merger were halted in December 2020.

- Alltel Information Services, $1.05 billion (2003)
- WebTone Technologies (2003)
- Sanchez Computer Associates, $175 million (2004)
- Aurum Technology (2004)
- BankWare (2004)
- InterCept (2004)
- Kordoba GmbH & Co, $163.2 million (2004)
- Merger with Certegy Inc., $1.8 billion (2006)
- eFunds Corporation (EFD), approximately $1.8 billion in cash (2007)
- Metavante Corporation, $2.94 billion in stock (2009)
- Compliance Coach, Inc, 2010
- Capco, $292 million (2010) In May 2017 FIS sold a 60% stake in Capco to CD&R funds for $477 million.
- Pronet Solutions, $24 million (2012)
- TDWI (Toronto Dominion Wealth Institutional) – now re-branded as Platform Securities (2013)
- mFoundry, $120 million (2013)
- CMSI (2014)
- Reliance Trust Company (2014) $110 million
- Clear2Pay (2014) $480 million
- SunGard (2015) $9.1 billion
- Worldpay, Inc. (2019) $43 billion
- Virtus Partners (2020)
- Payrix (2022)
- Bond Financial Technologies (2023)
- Torstone Technology (2024)
- Dragonfly Financial Technologies (2024)
- Demica (2024)
- Amount (2025)
- Everlink (2025)
- Global Payments' Issuer Solutions business (formerly TSYS), $13.5 billion (2026)

=== Divestments ===
In February 2023, in the wake of pressure from activist investors, the company announced it would spin off its merchant business that consisted of Worldpay in the 12 months that followed. In July 2023, FIS agreed to sell a 55 percent stake in Worldpay to private equity firm GTCR for $11.7 billion, valuing Worldpay at $18.5 billion. On February 1, 2024, the company announced it had completed the sale of a majority stake in its Worldpay Merchant Solutions business to GTCR in a transaction that valued the deal at US$18.5 billion, including US$1 billion contingent on returns realized by GTCR. FIS will maintain commercial agreements with Worldpay and will create a joint strategic go-to-market partnership between the two entities.

In April 2025, Global Payments agreed to acquire Worldpay, for $22 billion from GTCR and FIS. As part of this deal, they also agreed to sell their Issuer Solutions business, TSYS, to FIS for $13.5 billion. The transaction was completed in January 2026, and upon completion of the transaction, FIS no longer held an ownership interest in Worldpay.

== Finances ==
FIS has experienced fluctuating revenue and profitability in recent years, influenced by acquisitions, divestitures, and restructuring efforts, most notably around its Worldpay business. After a decline in 2022, the company stabilised its performance in 2023 and returned to growth in 2024.

In 2024, FIS reported $14.51 billion in revenue, an increase from $14.50 billion in 2023. Operating income grew significantly to $3.55 billion, and net income reached $1.94 billion, reflecting improved margin performance following the spin-off of Worldpay. As of Q1 2025, the company reported strong quarterly results with a 3% year-over-year revenue increase and an adjusted EPS of $1.21. It expects to return over $1.2 billion to shareholders in 2025 through share repurchases and dividends.

Year	Revenue in mil. US$	Net income in mil. US$	Total Assets in mil. US$	Price per Share in US$	Employees
2005	2,688	197	4,189	15.77	15,000
2006	2,417	259	7,631	18.08	16,000
2007	2,893	561	9,795	22.46	18,000
2008	3,360	215	7,500	17.28	20,000
2009	3,711	106	13,998	18.23	25,000
2010	5,146	405	14,176	23.27	30,000
2011	5,626	470	13,873	25.85	33,000
2012	5,796	461	13,550	29.22	34,000
2013	6,063	493	13,960	40.54	38,000
2014	6,413	679	14,521	52.41	40,000
2015	6,596	632	26,200	62.80	55,000
2016	9,241	568	26,031	69.40	55,000
2017	9,123	1,319	24,517	86.11	53,000
2018	8,423	846	23,770	102.55	47,000
2019	10,333	298	83,806	139.09	55,000
2020	12,552	158	83,842	141.46	62,000
2021	13,877	417	82,931	109.15	65,000
2022	14,530	-16,572	83,290	63.00	65,000
2023	14,500	-6,655	76,290	65.70	53,000
2024	14,510	1,450	69,820	74.30	45,000

== Controversies ==
On July 3, 2007, Certegy Check Services, part of FIS, announced that a worker at one of its subsidiaries stole 2.3 million consumer records containing credit card, bank account, and other personal information. This estimate was later increased to 8.5 million consumer records. The next month, a law firm filed a class-action lawsuit against CCS and parent company FIS based on the privacy breach; the firm claims that, since CCS provides check-verification services to many major U.S. stores, "consumers do not choose to use the services of these companies but rather are forced to do so".

In August 2011, Florida based eFunds Prepaid Solutions, part of FIS, was the victim of a sophisticated cyberattack that saw hackers steal $13 million from ATMs using 22 stolen prepaid cards belonging to a single client of FIS.

On January 16-17, 2025, FIS reported a power outage causing technical issues at a large number of banks, including Capital One. Depositors reported not being able to access online or mobile banking or not having accurate current data.
