= Charles Hawks Jr. =

20th century American politician

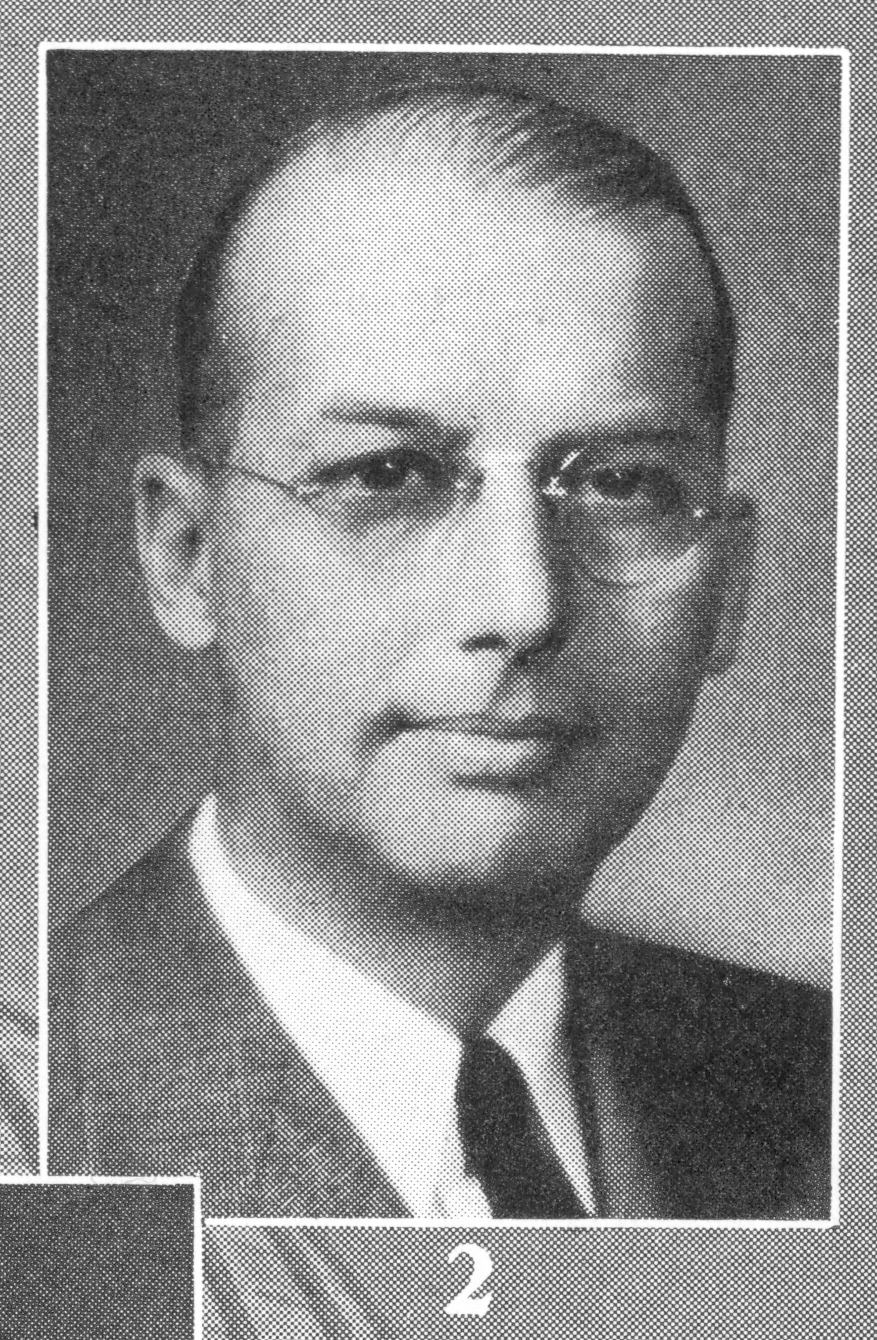

Member of the U.S. House of Representatives from Wisconsin's 2nd district
- In office January 3, 1939 – January 3, 1941
- Preceded by: Harry Sauthoff
- Succeeded by: Harry Sauthoff

Personal details
- Born: July 7, 1899 Horicon, Wisconsin, U.S.
- Died: January 6, 1960 (aged 60) Bryn Mawr Hospital; Bryn Mawr, Pennsylvania, U.S.
- Resting place: Oakhill Cemetery, Horicon, Wisconsin
- Party: Republican
- Spouse: Lucille Alma McGinnis (m. 1928–1960)
- Children: Ann Hawks^{(b. 1930; died 2005)}; Charles Hawks III^{(b. 1938; died 1993)}
- Parents: Charles Hawks Sr. (father); Linda (Yankey) Hawks (mother)
- Relatives: Eli Hawks (grandfather)
- Education: University of Wisconsin
- Occupation: Businessman, politician

Military service
- Allegiance: United States
- Branch/service: United States Navy
- Years of service: 1917–1919
- Rank: Yeoman 1st Class
- Unit: USS Rhode Island (BB-17)
- Battles/wars: World War I

Charles Hawks Jr. (July 7, 1899 – January 6, 1960) was an American businessman and Republican politician from Dodge County, Wisconsin. He served one term in the U.S. House of Representatives, representing Wisconsin's 2nd congressional district during the 76th U.S. Congress (1939–1941). He was an avowed isolationist in the lead-up to World War II and was praised by the German American Bund. His grandfather, Eli Hawks, was a member of the Wisconsin State Assembly and mayor of Juneau, Wisconsin. His father, Charles Hawks Sr., was a prominent banker and served as mayor of Horicon, Wisconsin.

== Early life and career ==
Charles Hawks Jr. was born and raised in Horicon, Wisconsin.

In his senior year at Horicon High School, he enlisted in the United States Navy a week after the United States declaration of war against Germany in World War I. After just four days training at Naval Station Great Lakes, he was assigned to the battleship USS Rhode Island (BB-17). He served two years and rose to the rank of yeoman 1st class before mustering out of the service in 1919. While serving aboard the Rhode Island, he assisted the 32nd Infantry Division (an activated Wisconsin National Guard unit) in smuggling their unofficial mascot—a goat named "Billy"—out of France and into the United States aboard the battleship. For the rest of his life, Hawks was active in the American Legion and the Veterans of Foreign Wars.

After returning from the war, Hawks immediately entered the University of Wisconsin and graduated from the business school in 1923. He then went to work as a salesman and insurance agent in Boston, Massachusetts, then Indianapolis, Indiana, and finally Wichita, Kansas. He returned to Horicon in the Summer of 1926, and opened his own insurance business, though it only lasted a few years; he closed that business moving briefly to Wauwatosa, Wisconsin, before going to work for Stanley Hanks Insurance in Madison, Wisconsin. In 1933, he was hired as an agent in Waukesha, Wisconsin, for the Northwestern Mutual insurance company.

== Political career ==
During the 1920s and 1930s, Hawks was also becoming active in the Republican Party of Wisconsin and was editor of the state party's Young Republican monthly newsletter. In 1936, he won his first elected office as a member of the Dodge County board of supervisors. Later that year, he entered the race for Wisconsin Secretary of State and was selected as the Republican nominee without opposition at the state convention. In the general election, Hawks came in a distant second place, receiving only 26% of the vote, as the Progressive Party incumbent, Theodore Dammann, easily won his sixth term.

Wisconsin's 2nd congressional district 1932–1963

Undaunted, Hawks continued activities in the Republican Party and was elected chairman of the Dodge County Republican Party. He was re-elected to the county board in April 1838 without opposition. In August, he announced he would run for United States House of Representatives, seeking the Republican nomination to challenge Progressive Party incumbent Harry Sauthoff in Wisconsin's 2nd congressional district. No other Republican candidates ultimately entered the race, and Hawks moved on to the general election facing the incumbent, Sauthoff, and Democratic nominee Reinhold Gerth.

In the general election, Hawks attacked the New Deal and progressive policies as neglectful of farmers and wasteful of public funds. He suggested progressive policies were damaging business confidence and preventing economic growth. The 1938 election saw a Republican wave; Hawks narrowly prevailed in his race, defeating Sauthoff by about 1,500 votes.

Early in the 76th Congress, Hawks came out in favor of maintaining total U.S. neutrality in the midst of Germany's creeping annexation of Czechoslovakia and the closing campaigns of the Spanish Civil War. Also early in the term, he received vociferous praise from the Nazi-backed German American Bund for a speech against Communism. Hawks continued to support total neutrality after the Nazi invasion of Poland in September. Hawks described Roosevelt's foreign policy as "war hysteria ... part of a program by this administration to make the citizens of this country forget about their domestic failures."

During the term, Hawks voted against most Roosevelt administration programs and appropriations, and opposed funding for a post office in his own hometown, Horicon. Journalists in Wisconsin eventually linked his vote against the post office to the fact that the current post office rented space from a building owned by Hawks' father.

In August 1939, Hawks was selected as manager for the presidential campaign of U.S. senator Styles Bridges. Hawks explained that Bridges wanted to focus on bringing his anti-New Deal message to young Republicans, and would embrace a strategy of courting unpledged delegates rather than attempting to win pledged delegates.

In the 1940 election, Hawks faced a rematch against Progressive Harry Sauthoff. Sauthoff attacked Hawks' votes against New Deal programs. Foreign policy played little role in the campaign as both had anti-war positions. Their rematch resulted in another close election, but this time Hawks was defeated, coming in 2,360 votes behind Sauthoff.

Immediately after leaving office, Hawks went to work as a lobbyist in Washington, D.C., for the Wisconsin Association of Manufacturers. But within months, Hawks made clear that he intended to run again. Later that year, however, the Attack on Pearl Harbor and the subsequent U.S. entry into World War II radically changed the politics of the 1942 election. Hawks faced a difficult primary against three other Republicans, including former University of Wisconsin football star and coach Edward J. Samp. Hawks came under intense criticism for his earlier previous anti-war votes, which were attacked as irresponsible and short-sighted. Hawks won the primary, but received only 38% of the vote.

In the general election, foreign policy loomed large as Wisconsin newspapers bemoaned a contest between two "isolationists". Sauthoff won the election by a substantial margin; Hawks received only 39% of the vote.

== Later years ==
After his loss in 1942, Hawks moved to Wynnewood, Pennsylvania, and went to work for the Sun Oil Co. for several years. In the 1950s, he was hired by General Grinding Wheel Corp. of Philadelphia as a vice president.

Charles Hawks Jr. died at Bryn Mawr Hospital in Bryn Mawr, Pennsylvania, on January 6, 1960, after an illness of two months. His body was interred at Oak Hill Cemetery in Horicon, Wisconsin.

== Personal life and family ==
Charles Hawks Jr. was the eldest of four children born to Charles Hawks and his wife Linda (née Yankey). Charles Hawks Sr. was a prominent and successful banker in Horicon, served as mayor of the city, and was an influential member of the Wisconsin Chamber of Commerce. Charles Jr.'s paternal grandfather was Eli Hawks, a grain merchant and Wisconsin pioneer who served as a member of the Wisconsin State Assembly, presidential elector, and mayor and postmaster of Juneau, Wisconsin.

Charles Jr. married Lucille Alma McGinnis, of Waukesha, on September 1, 1928. They had two children together and were married for 31 years before his death in 1960.

== Electoral history ==
=== Wisconsin Secretary of State (1936) ===
Wisconsin Secretary of State Election, 1936
Party	Candidate	Votes	%	±%
General Election, November 3, 1936
Progressive	Theodore Dammann (incumbent)	601,638	52.12%	+5.46pp
Republican	Charles Hawks Jr.	300,026	25.99%	+6.35pp
Democratic	Blazius B. Krygier	247,592	21.45%	−6.10pp
Socialist Labor	Charles S. Ehrhardt	3,383	0.29%	
Prohibition	Mayme H. Swanson	1,656	0.14%	
Plurality		301,612	26.13%	+7.03pp
Total votes		1,154,295	100.0%	+27.55%
Progressive hold				

=== U.S. House (1938, 1940, 1942) ===
Year	Election	Date	Elected				Defeated				Total	Plurality
1938	General	Nov. 8	Charles Hawks Jr.	Republican	42,154	44.85%	Harry Sauthoff (inc)	Prog.	40,656	43.25%	93,998	1,498
1938	General	Nov. 8	Charles Hawks Jr.	Republican	42,154	44.85%	Reinhold A. Gerth	Dem.	11,185	11.90%	93,998	1,498
1940	Primary	Sep. 17	Charles Hawks Jr. (inc)	Republican	22,173	72.06%	Otto F. Goetsch	Rep.	8,597	27.94%	30,770	13,576
1940	General	Nov. 5	Harry Sauthoff	Progressive	60,481	44.20%	Charles Hawks Jr. (inc)	Rep.	58,121	42.47%	136,842	2,360
1940	General	Nov. 5	Harry Sauthoff	Progressive	60,481	44.20%	Thomas R. Brooks	Dem.	18,237	13.33%	136,842	2,360
1942	Primary	Sep. 15	Charles Hawks Jr.	Republican	9,831	37.62%	Edward J. Samp	Rep.	8,443	32.31%	27,603	1,388
1942	Primary	Sep. 15	Charles Hawks Jr.	Republican	9,831	37.62%	Arthur May	Rep.	5,441	20.82%	27,603	1,388
1942	Primary	Sep. 15	Charles Hawks Jr.	Republican	9,831	37.62%	Frederick W. Leissring	Rep.	2,419	9.26%	27,603	1,388
1942	General	Nov. 3	Harry Sauthoff (inc)	Progressive	43,412	50.19%	Charles Hawks Jr.	Rep.	34,272	39.62%	86,500	9,140
1942	General	Nov. 3	Harry Sauthoff (inc)	Progressive	43,412	50.19%	Thomas R. Brooks	Dem.	8,315	9.61%	86,500	9,140
1942	General	Nov. 3	Harry Sauthoff (inc)	Progressive	43,412	50.19%	Frederick A. Hale	Soc.	476	0.55%	86,500	9,140

Party political offices
Preceded by John F. Jardine	Republican nominee for Secretary of State of Wisconsin; 1936	Succeeded by Fred R. Zimmerman
U.S. House of Representatives
Preceded by Harry Sauthoff	Member of the U.S. House of Representatives from Wisconsin's 2nd congressional district January 3, 1939 – January 3, 1941	Succeeded by Harry Sauthoff
