= 1944 United States Senate election in Wisconsin =

- November 7, 1944
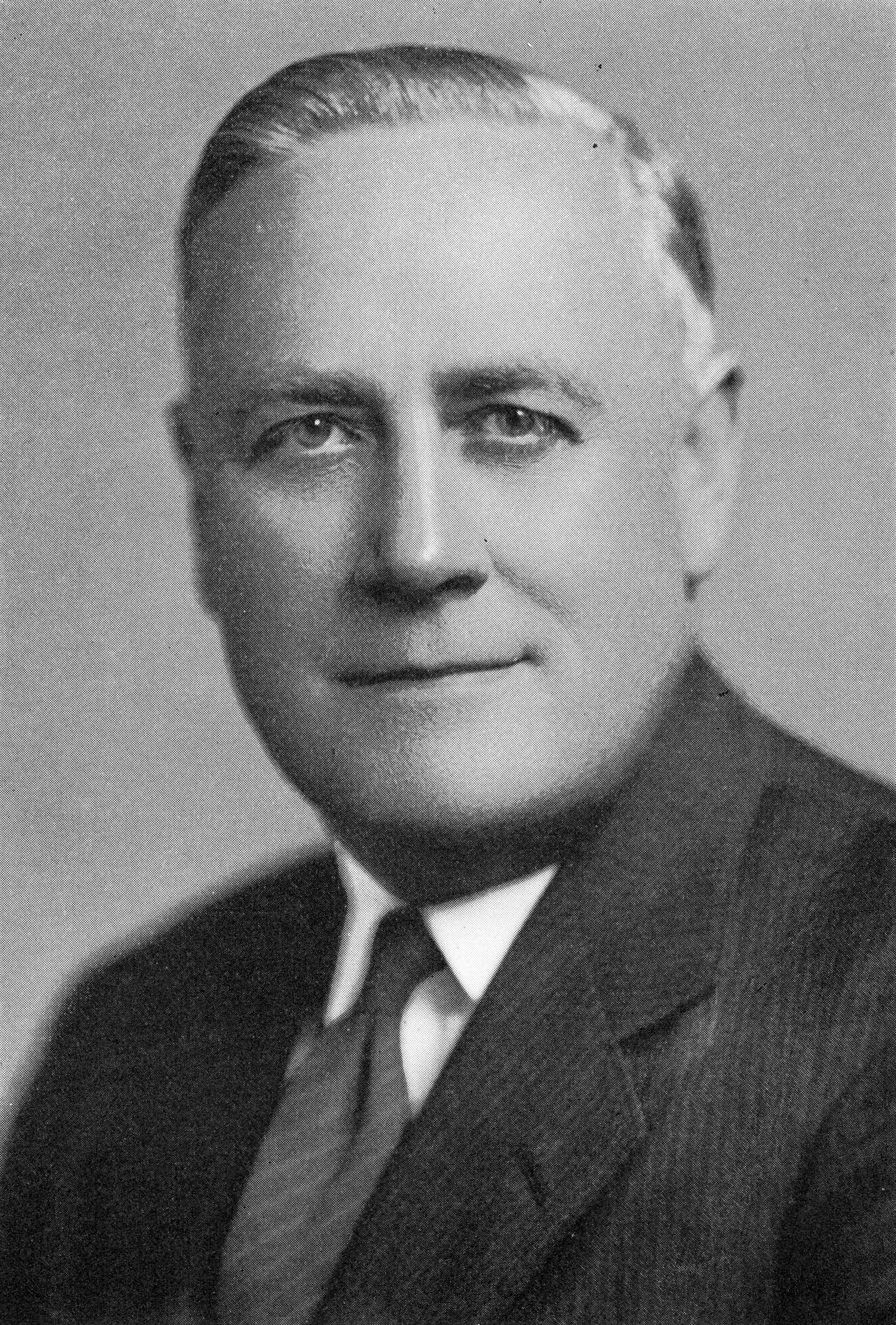

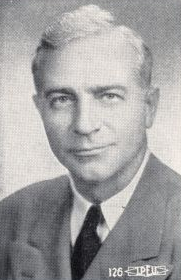

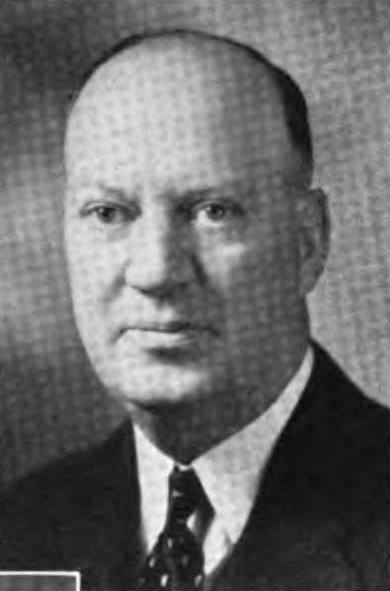
Nominee	Alexander Wiley	Howard J. McMurray	Harry Sauthoff
Party	Republican	Democratic	Progressive
Popular vote	634,513	537,144	73,089
Percentage	50.50%	42.75%	5.82%
- County results Wiley: 40–50% 50–60% 60–70% 70–80% 80–90% McMurray: 40–50% 50–60% 60–70%
U.S. senator before election
Alexander Wiley
Republican
Elected U.S. Senator
Alexander Wiley
Republican

The 1944 United States Senate election in Wisconsin was held on November 7, 1944. Incumbent Republican U.S. Senator Alexander Wiley was re-elected to a second term in office over Howard J. McMurray and Harry Sauthoff. Future Senator Joseph McCarthy challenged Wiley in the Republican primary.

== Republican primary ==
=== Candidates ===
- Joseph McCarthy, Judge of the Wisconsin Circuit Court for the 10th Circuit
- Leathern Smith
- Perry J. Stearns
- Alexander Wiley, incumbent U.S. Senator since 1939

=== Results ===
1944 U.S. Senate Republican primary
Party	Candidate	Votes	%
Republican	Alexander Wiley (incumbent)	153,570	52.74%
Republican	Joseph McCarthy	79,389	27.76%
Republican	Leathern Smith	44,195	15.18%
Republican	Perry J. Stearns	14,048	4.82%
Total votes		291,202	100.00%

== General election ==
=== Candidates ===
- Howard J. McMurray, U.S. Representative from Milwaukee (Democratic)
- Harry Sauthoff, U.S. Representative from Madison (Progressive)
- Walter H. Uphoff (Social-Democratic)
- Alexander Wiley, incumbent U.S. Senator since 1939 (Republican)

=== Results ===
1944 U.S. Senate election in Wisconsin
Party	Candidate	Votes	%	±%
Republican	Alexander Wiley (incumbent)	634,513	50.50%	
Democratic	Howard J. McMurray	537,144	42.75%	
Progressive	Harry Sauthoff	73,089	5.82%	
Social-Democratic	Walter H. Uphoff	9,964	0.79%	
Socialist Labor	Adolf Wiggert	1,664	0.13%	
Republican hold		Swing		

== See also ==
- 1944 United States Senate elections
