= Howard J. McMurray =

American politician

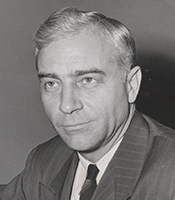

Member of the U.S. House of Representatives from Wisconsin's 5th district
- In office January 3, 1943 – January 3, 1945
- Preceded by: Lewis D. Thill
- Succeeded by: Andrew Biemiller

Personal details
- Born: March 3, 1901 Mount Hope, Kansas
- Died: August 14, 1961 (aged 60) Albuquerque, New Mexico
- Party: Democratic

Howard Johnstone McMurray (March 3, 1901 – August 14, 1961) was a U.S. representative from Wisconsin, educator, and businessman.

== Biography ==
Born near Mount Hope, Kansas, in Harvey County, Kansas, McMurray attended the public school, Berea Academy at Berea, Kentucky, and high school at Madison, Wisconsin. He graduated from the University of Wisconsin–Madison in 1936. He engaged in the life insurance business 1923–1928, and was an executive with air transport companies 1928–1935. He was a teacher of political science at the University of Wisconsin–Madison 1936–1942.

McMurray was elected as a Democrat to the Seventy-eighth Congress (January 3, 1943 – January 3, 1945) as the representative of Wisconsin's 5th congressional district.

A confidential 1943 analysis of the House Foreign Affairs Committee by Isaiah Berlin for the British Foreign Office described McMurray as

a new-comer to the House, who defeated his Republican opponent mostly on the latter's Isolationist record. A man of some intellectual ability and a staunch internationalist, who has lectured for some years on national and pro-British and an advocate of "Union Now" with English-speaking peoples. Recently he criticised Republicans' attempt to get estimates in dollars and cents of the balance between Lend-Lease to Britain and British Reciprocal Aid, charging that such figures would give a misleading impression to the man in the street of Allied indebtedness, and warning that such an impression could be dangerously handled by those wanting to make trouble. Apt to irritate his more serious-minded colleagues by a stream of wisecracks.

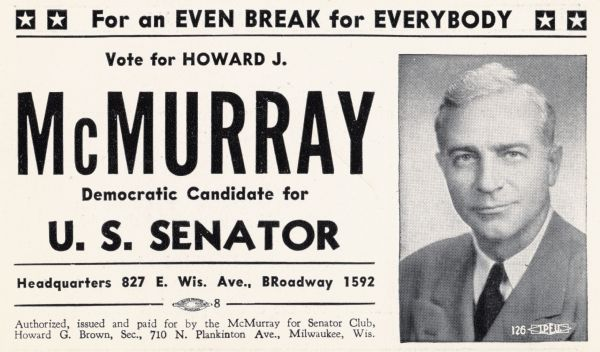
Campaign brochure for McMurray's 1946 Senate candidacy

McMurray was not a candidate for renomination in 1944, but was an unsuccessful Democratic candidate for election to the United States Senate in 1944 and again in 1946. He is best known for his 1946 campaign in which he lost in a landslide to the Republican candidate, Joseph McCarthy. He was also a notable academic, serving as lecturer in political science at the University of Wisconsin–Madison in 1945 and 1946, Professor of political science at Occidental College, Los Angeles, California from 1947 to 1949, and as Professor of government, University of New Mexico, from 1949 until his death in Albuquerque, New Mexico, August 14, 1961. He was interred in Fairview Park Cemetery.

== Sources ==
- United States Congress. "Howard J. McMurray (id: M000579)". Biographical Directory of the United States Congress.

Party political offices
Preceded by F. Ryan Duffy	Democratic nominee for U.S. Senator from Wisconsin (Class 3); 1944	Succeeded by Thomas E. Fairchild
Preceded by James E. Finnegan	Democratic nominee for U.S. Senator from Wisconsin (Class 1); 1946	Succeeded by Thomas E. Fairchild
U.S. House of Representatives
Preceded by Lewis D. Thill	Member of the U.S. House of Representatives from Wisconsin's 5th congressional district January 3, 1943 – January 3, 1945	Succeeded by Andrew Biemiller
