= Lewis D. Thill =

American politician (1903–1975)

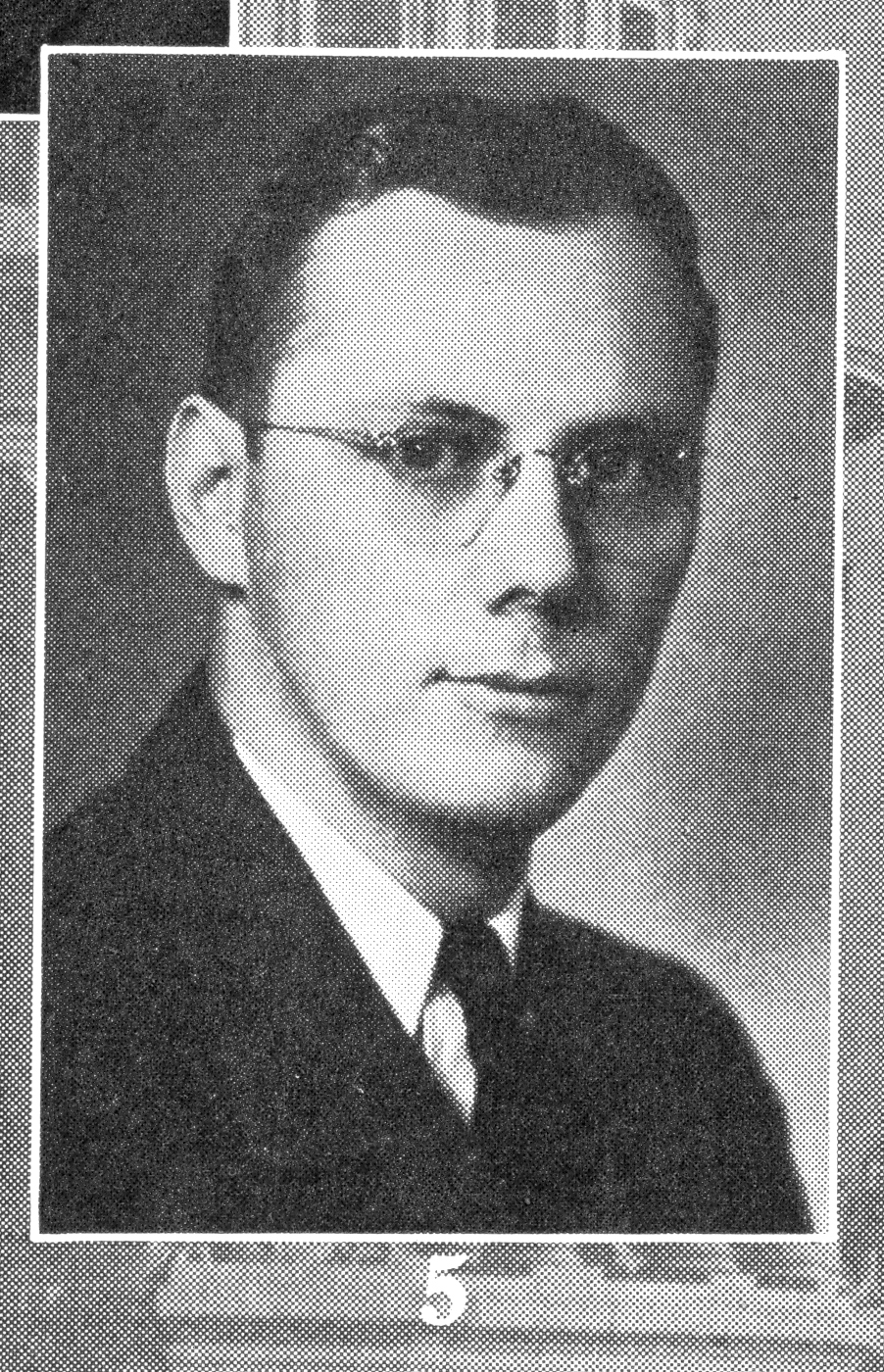

Member of the U.S. House of Representatives from Wisconsin's 5th district
- In office January 3, 1939 – January 3, 1943
- Preceded by: Thomas O' Malley
- Succeeded by: Howard J. McMurray

Personal details
- Born: Lewis Dominic Thill; October 18, 1903 Milwaukee, Wisconsin, U.S.
- Died: May 6, 1975 (aged 71) San Diego, California, U.S.
- Resting place: Holy Cross Cemetery, San Diego, California, U.S.
- Party: Republican
- Spouse: Carol Jean Werner
- Parent(s): Dominic P. Thill; Mary Louise Pierron
- Education: Marquette University; Harvard Graduate School; Northwestern University; University of Wisconsin Law School
- Profession: Politician, lawyer

Lewis Dominic Thill (October 18, 1903 – May 6, 1975) was an American politician and lawyer who served in the United States House of Representatives from 1939 to 1943, representing the 5th congressional district of Wisconsin as a Republican in the 76th United States Congress and the 77th United States Congress.

== Early life and education ==
Thill was born in Milwaukee, Wisconsin on October 18, 1903 to Dominic P. Thill and Mary Louise Pierron. He attended public and parochial schools and graduated from Marquette University in 1926.

Thill subsequently attended Harvard Graduate School and Northwestern University before graduating from the law department of the University of Wisconsin–Madison in 1931.

== Career ==
Thill was admitted to the bar in 1932; he commenced practice in Milwaukee. He became engaged in the real estate and investment business.

Thill served in the United States House of Representatives from 1939 to 1943, representing the 5th congressional district of Wisconsin as a Republican in the 76th United States Congress and the 77th United States Congress. His tenure began on January 3, 1939 and concluded on January 3, 1943.

Thill was an unsuccessful candidate for re-election in 1942 to the 78th United States Congress and in 1944 to the 79th United States Congress. Thill unsuccessfully contested the result of his 1942 election, in which he was defeated by his successor, Democrat Howard J. McMurray. Thill alleged that McMurray had violated state and federal law by spending $7,000 on his campaign, far above the allowed maximum of $875.

== Personal life and death ==
Thill was married to Carol Jean Werner.

Thill was well acquainted with Julius P. Heil, the 30th governor of Wisconsin, whose nephew married Thill's sister.

Later in life, Thill moved to San Diego, California, where he died at the age of 71 on May 6, 1975. He is entombed in Holy Cross Cemetery, located in San Diego.

U.S. House of Representatives
Preceded by Thomas O'Malley	Member of the U.S. House of Representatives from Wisconsin's 5th congressional district 1939–1943	Succeeded by Howard J. McMurray
