= John Tracy (Wisconsin politician) =

American politician from Wisconsin (1852–1931)

John Tracy (1852–1931) was an Irish American politician. He was a member of the Wisconsin State Assembly.

== Biography ==
Tracy was born on April 18, 1852, in County Limerick, Ireland. In 1865, he moved to Appleton, Wisconsin, in Outagamie County. There, he worked in a hub factory. In addition, Tracy owned near-by farm in the county.

In November 1879, he married Margaret Powers and would have seven children. Tracy and his family attended St. Mary's Parish. He died on June 24, 1931.

== Political career ==
Tracy was elected to the Assembly in 1890 and 1892. From 1882 to 1890, he was a member of the city council of Appleton, serving as its President in 1887. Other positions Tracy held include Chairman of the county board of Outagamie County. He was a Democrat.
