= Harry Sauthoff =

American politician (1879–1966)

Harry Edward Sauthoff
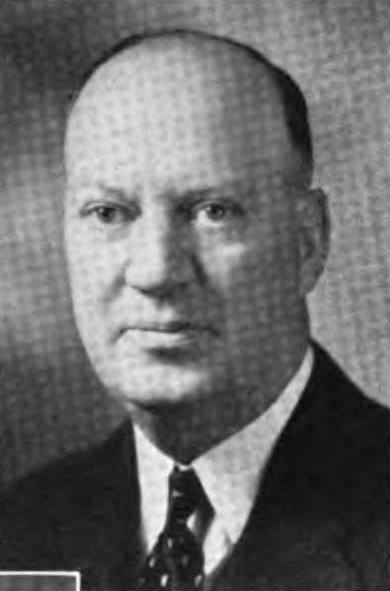
- Sauthoff c. 1935

Member of the U.S. House of Representatives from Wisconsin's 2nd district
- In office January 3, 1941 – January 3, 1945
- Preceded by: Charles Hawks Jr.
- Succeeded by: Robert Kirkland Henry
- In office January 3, 1935 – January 3, 1939
- Preceded by: Charles W. Henney
- Succeeded by: Charles Hawks Jr.

Member of the Wisconsin Senate from the 26th district
- In office January 5, 1925 – January 7, 1929
- Preceded by: Henry Huber
- Succeeded by: Glenn D. Roberts

District Attorney of Dane County
- In office January 1, 1915 – January 1, 1919
- Preceded by: William Ryan
- Succeeded by: Roman Heilman

Personal details
- Born: June 3, 1879 Madison, Wisconsin, U.S.
- Died: June 16, 1966 (aged 87) Madison, Wisconsin, U.S.
- Resting place: Forest Hill Cemetery; Madison, Wisconsin, U.S.
- Party: Republican (before 1934); Progressive (after 1934)
- Education: University of Wisconsin–Madison
- Coaching career

Coaching career (HC unless noted)

Football
- 1905: Northern Illinois State Normal

Basketball
- 1905–1906: Northern Illinois State Normal

Head coaching record
- Overall: 3–1–1 (football); 7–2 (basketball)

Harry Edward Sauthoff (June 3, 1879 – June 16, 1966) was an American teacher, coach, lawyer, and politician from Madison, Wisconsin. He served four terms in the U.S. House of Representatives, representing Wisconsin's 2nd congressional district from 1935 to 1939, and again from 1941 to 1945. During his years in Congress, Sauthoff was a member of the short-lived Wisconsin Progressive Party, but prior to his Congressional service, he was a member of the progressive faction of the Republican Party and served four years in the Wisconsin Senate and two years as district attorney of Dane County, Wisconsin. He was the Progressive Party's last nominee for U.S. Senate in Wisconsin, coming in a distant 3rd place in the 1944 election.

== Early life ==
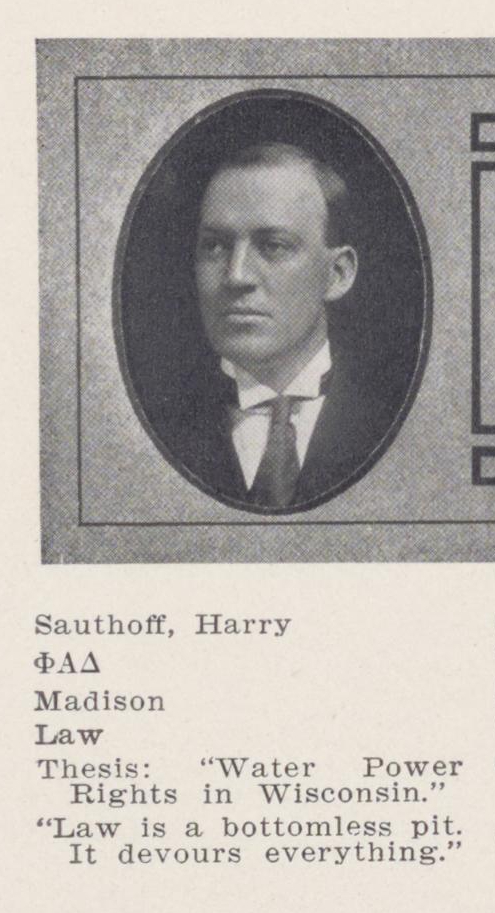
Sauthoff in the University of Wisconsin–Madison yearbook, 1910

Harry Sauthoff was born on June 3, 1879, in Madison, Wisconsin. Sauthoff was the son of August and Hermine Sauthoff. Both his parents were German immigrants from the province of Hanover. He graduated from the University of Wisconsin–Madison in 1902. After his undergraduate education he taught and coached for Lake Geneva High School from 1902 to 1905 and Northern Illinois University from 1905 to 1906. He served as the head football coach at Northern Illinois University in 1905, compiling a record of 3–1–1. Sauthoff was also the head basketball coach at Northern Illinois for one season in 1905–06. Sauthoff was a 1909 graduate of the University of Wisconsin Law School.

== Political career ==
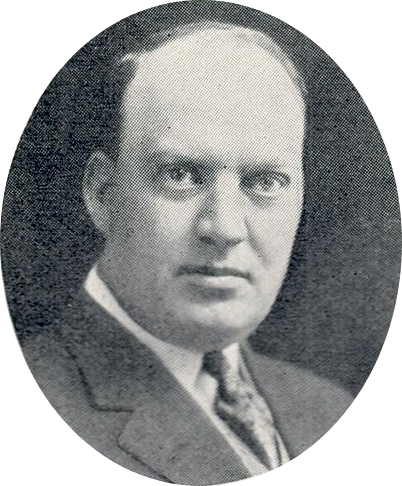
Sauthoff's official State Senate portrait, 1925

Sauthoff served as district attorney of Dane County, Wisconsin from 1915 to 1919. In 1921 Sauthoff served as Secretary to Governor John J. Blaine. He served as a delegate to the International Conference on the St. Lawrence Deep Waterway and the Mississippi Valley Conference on Mississippi River Improvement in 1921.

Sauthoff served in the Wisconsin State Senate from 1925 to 1929. In 1934 he was elected as a Progressive to the United States House of Representatives, representing Wisconsin's 2nd congressional district. He served from January 3, 1935 to January 3, 1939 as part of the 74th and 75th United States Congresses. He lost his reelection bid in the 1938 election. He ran again in 1940 and won, serving from January 3, 1941 to January 3, 1945 as part of the 77th and 78th Congresses. He was defeated in the 1944 election for the United States Senate, receiving 5.8 percent of the vote as a third-party candidate.

Sauthoff resumed practicing law until his retirement in 1955.

== Personal life ==
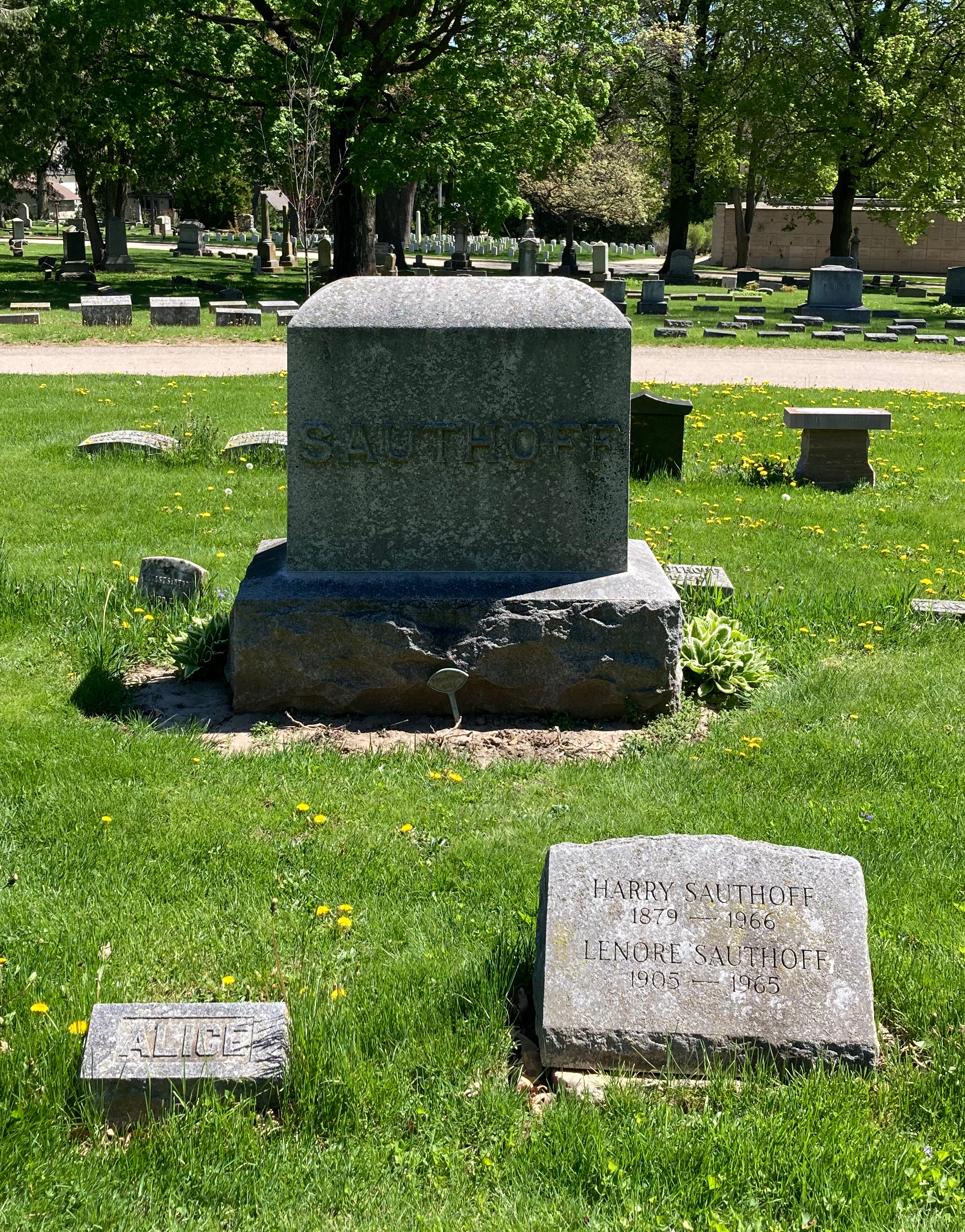
Sauthoff's grave at Forest Hill Cemetery

Sauthoff died on June 16, 1966, in Madison. He was buried at Forest Hill Cemetery in Madison.

== Head coaching record ==
=== Football ===
Year	Team	Overall	Conference	Standing	Bowl/playoffs
Northern Illinois State Normal (Independent) (1905)
1905	Northern Illinois State Normal	3–1–1			
Northern Illinois State Normal:		3–1–1			
Total:		3–1–1			

Party political offices
Preceded by Herman Ekern	Progressive nominee for U.S. Senator from Wisconsin (Class 3); 1944	Party dissolved
U.S. House of Representatives
Preceded by Charles W. Henney	Member of the U.S. House of Representatives from Wisconsin's 2nd congressional district January 3, 1935 – January 3, 1939	Succeeded by Charles Hawks Jr.
Preceded by Charles Hawks Jr.	Member of the U.S. House of Representatives from Wisconsin's 2nd congressional district January 3, 1941 – January 3, 1945	Succeeded by Robert Kirkland Henry
