= Holy Cross Cemetery (San Diego) =

Cemetery in San Diego, California

Coordinates: 32°43′01.07″N 117°05′52.45″W

Holy Cross Cemetery is a cemetery in the Chollas View neighborhood of San Diego, California. It was dedicated in 1919 for the exclusive use of Roman Catholics, with expansions in 1945 and 1956. The mausoleum, with its distinctive blue roof visible from California State Route 94, is a landmark of San Diego.

== Notable interments ==
- Elliott Buckmaster (1889–1976) American naval officer and Naval Aviator
- Charles F. Buddy (1887–1936), first bishop of the Roman Catholic Diocese of San Diego
- Andrew Cunanan (1969–1997), spree killer, most notable for his murder of Gianni Versace
- Johnny Downs (1913–1994), actor
- William Gargan (1905–1979), actor
- Charlotte Henry (1914–1980), actress
- Leo Thomas Maher (1915–1991), third bishop of the Roman Catholic Diocese of San Diego
- Anita Page (1910–2008), actress
- Joseph A. Roxburgh, Major League Baseball player
- Lewis D. Thill (1903–1975), Wisconsin congressman
