= 1946 United States Senate election in Wisconsin =

- November 5, 1946
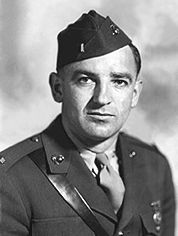

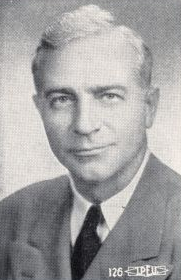
Nominee	Joseph McCarthy	Howard J. McMurray
Party	Republican	Democratic
Popular vote	620,430	378,772
Percentage	61.28%	37.41%
- County results McCarthy: 50–60% 60–70% 70–80% 80–90% McMurray: 50–60%
U.S. senator before election
Robert La Follette, Jr.
Progressive
Elected U.S. Senator
Joseph McCarthy
Republican

The 1946 United States Senate election in Wisconsin was held on November 5, 1946.

Incumbent Republican U.S. Senator Robert La Follette, Jr. (who had until 1946 been a member of the Progressive Party) narrowly lost the primary election to Joseph McCarthy. McCarthy would go on to win the general election against Rep. Howard McMurray of Milwaukee in a landslide. McCarthy became the first person other than a La Follette to hold this seat since 1906.

== Background ==
Robert M. La Follette Jr. had served as U.S. Senator since the special election held after his father's death. He and his brother Philip La Follette came to lead the Wisconsin Progressive Party which became one of the state's major parties, but declined in power by the early 1940s. La Follette Jr. would have to merge with one of the main parties in order to win re-election in 1946.

Henry A. Wallace wrote a letter to La Follette Jr. asking him and the Progressives "with their great tradition of liberal action come home to the party of Roosevelt, rather than return to the party of Hoover." However, they chose to join the Republicans, but a minority joined the Democrats.

== Republican primary ==
=== Candidates ===
==== Nominee ====
- Joseph McCarthy, judge of Wisconsin's 10th Circuit Court

==== Eliminated in primary ====
- Robert La Follette, Jr., incumbent U.S. Senator
- Perry J. Stearns, candidate for Senate in 1944

=== Campaign ===
The Republican primary election was noted for its divisiveness and bitterness.

The incumbent senator La Follette, who had just re-joined the Republican Party after the collapse of the Wisconsin Progressive Party earlier that year, was challenged by Judge Joe McCarthy of Appleton. Disbanding the Progressive Party and seeking election on the Republican ticket that same year cost him the support of many progressive supporters that belonged to the former, while the more conservative Republicans were also suspicious of La Follette, as he had previously run against them.

La Follette ran an isolationist campaign against the United Nations and was critical of Soviet dictator Joseph Stalin. Confident of victory, he remained in Washington to draft and win passage of the Legislative Reorganization Act of 1946 rather than returning to Wisconsin to campaign for re-election.

McCarthy campaigned aggressively and attacked La Follette for not enlisting during World War II, although La Follette had been 46 when Pearl Harbor was bombed and would have been too old to be accepted. McCarthy played up his own wartime service, using his wartime nickname, "Tail-Gunner Joe," and the slogan "Congress needs a tail-gunner." McCarthy also claimed that while he had been away fighting for his country, La Follette had made huge profits from investments; the suggestion that La Follette had been guilty of war profiteering was deeply damaging.

While La Follette initially started with a large lead in the polls, that lead gradually dwindled, and on the primary election day, the results of the final county to report polls tipped the scales in McCarthy's favor. La Follette sent a one-word telegram saying "Congratulations" to McCarthy.

=== Results ===
GOP primary results by county McCarthy 40–50% McCarthy 50–60% McCarthy 60–70% La Follette 40–50% La Follette 50–60% La Follette 60–70% La Follette 70–80%

1946 Republican U.S. Senate primary
Party	Candidate	Votes	%
Republican	Joseph McCarthy	207,935	47.25%
Republican	Robert M. La Follette, Jr. (incumbent)	202,557	46.03%
Republican	Perry J. Stearns	29,605	6.73%
Total votes		440,097	100.00%

== Democratic primary ==
=== Candidates ===
- Howard J. McMurray, U.S. Representative from Milwaukee

=== Results ===
McMurray was unopposed for the Democratic nomination.

== General election ==
=== Candidates ===
- Georgia Cozzini, candidate for governor in 1946 (Socialist Labor)
- Edwin Knappe, former state assemblyman (1919–21) (Social-Democratic)
- Joseph McCarthy, judge of Wisconsin's 10th Circuit Court (Republican)
- Howard J. McMurray, U.S. Representative from Milwaukee (Democratic)

=== Results ===
General election results
Party	Candidate	Votes	%	±%
Republican	Joseph McCarthy	620,430	61.28%	▲19.90
Democratic	Howard J. McMurray	378,772	37.41%	▲24.21
Social-Democratic	Edwin Knappe	11,750	1.16%	▲1.16
Socialist Labor	Georgia Cozzini	1,552	0.15%	▲0.07
None	Scattering	2,090	0.21%	N/A
Majority		241,658	23.82%	
Total votes		1,014,594	100.00%	
Republican hold				

==== Results by county ====
County	Joseph Raymond McCarthy Republican		Howard Johnstone McMurray Democratic		Edwin W. Knappe Social-Democratic		Georgia Olive Cozzini Socialist Labor		Margin		Total votes cast
County	#	%	#	%	#	%	#	%	#	%	Total votes cast
Adams	1,336	63.11%	769	36.32%	9	0.43%	3	0.14%	567	26.78%	2,117
Ashland	3,144	56.18%	2,416	43.17%	23	0.41%	13	0.23%	728	13.01%	5,596
Barron	5,093	64.45%	2,778	35.16%	31	0.39%	0	0.00%	2,315	29.30%	7,902
Bayfield	2,412	56.75%	1,811	42.61%	19	0.45%	8	0.19%	601	14.14%	4,250
Brown	20,089	65.25%	10,660	34.62%	35	0.11%	4	0.01%	9,429	30.63%	30,788
Buffalo	2,877	70.41%	1,177	28.81%	21	0.51%	11	0.27%	1,700	41.61%	4,086
Burnett	1,644	60.91%	1,040	38.53%	10	0.37%	5	0.19%	604	22.38%	2,699
Calumet	4,432	71.97%	1,706	27.70%	19	0.31%	1	0.02%	2,726	44.27%	6,158
Chippewa	7,201	62.55%	4,236	36.80%	53	0.46%	22	0.19%	2,965	25.76%	11,512
Clark	5,818	67.42%	2,721	31.53%	83	0.96%	8	0.09%	3,097	35.89%	8,630
Columbia	6,589	66.94%	3,212	32.63%	40	0.41%	2	0.02%	3,377	34.31%	9,843
Crawford	3,805	65.86%	1,964	34.00%	5	0.09%	3	0.05%	1,841	31.87%	5,777
Dane	23,222	47.38%	25,200	51.42%	557	1.14%	30	0.06%	-1,978	-4.04%	49,009
Dodge	10,556	71.41%	4,151	28.08%	72	0.49%	3	0.02%	6,405	43.33%	14,782
Door	4,751	84.37%	864	15.34%	12	0.21%	4	0.07%	3,887	69.03%	5,631
Douglas	7,389	52.74%	6,522	46.56%	72	0.51%	26	0.19%	867	6.19%	14,009
Dunn	4,549	67.41%	2,149	31.85%	35	0.52%	15	0.22%	2,400	35.57%	6,748
Eau Claire	8,615	56.36%	6,610	43.24%	57	0.37%	5	0.03%	2,005	13.12%	15,287
Florence	668	63.56%	375	35.68%	8	0.76%	0	0.00%	293	27.88%	1,051
Fond du Lac	14,023	69.72%	5,967	29.67%	88	0.44%	34	0.17%	8,056	40.06%	20,112
Forest	1,491	51.65%	1,384	47.94%	8	0.28%	4	0.14%	107	3.71%	2,887
Grant	9,115	72.26%	3,440	27.27%	40	0.32%	20	0.16%	5,675	44.99%	12,615
Green	4,079	68.32%	1,864	31.22%	27	0.45%	0	0.00%	2,215	37.10%	5,970
Green Lake	3,789	80.22%	925	19.59%	5	0.11%	4	0.08%	2,864	60.64%	4,723
Iowa	4,418	67.82%	2,084	31.99%	11	0.17%	1	0.02%	2,334	35.83%	6,514
Iron	1,687	51.59%	1,561	47.74%	16	0.49%	6	0.18%	126	3.85%	3,270
Jackson	2,666	64.40%	1,440	34.78%	24	0.58%	10	0.24%	1,226	29.61%	4,140
Jefferson	8,379	66.83%	4,105	32.74%	50	0.40%	3	0.02%	4,274	34.09%	12,537
Juneau	3,717	74.64%	1,237	24.84%	25	0.50%	1	0.02%	2,480	49.80%	4,980
Kenosha	12,912	50.64%	12,411	48.67%	131	0.51%	44	0.17%	501	1.96%	25,498
Kewaunee	3,737	71.05%	1,519	28.88%	4	0.08%	0	0.00%	2,218	42.17%	5,260
La Crosse	11,092	66.18%	5,547	33.09%	99	0.59%	23	0.14%	5,545	33.08%	16,761
Lafayette	3,764	63.05%	2,179	36.50%	23	0.39%	4	0.07%	1,585	26.55%	5,970
Langlade	4,299	60.30%	2,811	39.43%	16	0.22%	3	0.04%	1,488	20.87%	7,129
Lincoln	4,405	71.51%	1,689	27.42%	51	0.83%	15	0.24%	2,716	44.09%	6,160
Manitowoc	12,615	60.77%	8,063	38.84%	66	0.32%	14	0.07%	4,552	21.93%	20,758
Marathon	12,231	55.02%	9,676	43.53%	309	1.39%	14	0.06%	2,555	11.49%	22,230
Marinette	6,132	68.56%	2,759	30.85%	41	0.46%	12	0.13%	3,373	37.71%	8,944
Marquette	2,035	81.47%	450	18.01%	11	0.44%	2	0.08%	1,585	63.45%	2,498
Milwaukee	151,104	54.74%	117,163	42.44%	6,910	2.50%	873	0.32%	33,941	12.30%	276,050
Monroe	5,250	69.08%	2,305	30.33%	42	0.55%	3	0.04%	2,945	38.75%	7,600
Oconto	5,116	72.23%	1,920	27.11%	40	0.56%	7	0.10%	3,196	45.12%	7,083
Oneida	3,238	58.20%	2,288	41.12%	32	0.58%	6	0.11%	950	17.07%	5,564
Outagamie	16,606	70.11%	6,929	29.25%	123	0.52%	29	0.12%	9,677	40.85%	23,687
Ozaukee	4,627	69.38%	2,018	30.26%	23	0.34%	1	0.01%	2,609	39.12%	6,669
Pepin	1,500	70.49%	624	29.32%	4	0.19%	0	0.00%	876	41.17%	2,128
Pierce	4,726	73.94%	1,600	25.03%	50	0.78%	16	0.25%	3,126	48.90%	6,392
Polk	4,070	61.94%	2,464	37.50%	36	0.55%	1	0.02%	1,606	24.44%	6,571
Portage	5,802	50.40%	5,689	49.42%	20	0.17%	1	0.01%	113	0.98%	11,512
Price	3,229	63.18%	1,812	35.45%	54	1.06%	16	0.31%	1,417	27.72%	5,111
Racine	18,175	52.06%	16,461	47.15%	229	0.66%	45	0.13%	1,714	4.91%	34,910
Richland	4,187	75.40%	1,353	24.37%	13	0.23%	0	0.00%	2,834	51.04%	5,553
Rock	17,409	65.71%	8,890	33.55%	178	0.67%	17	0.06%	8,519	32.15%	26,494
Rusk	3,340	66.64%	1,641	32.74%	25	0.50%	6	0.12%	1,699	33.90%	5,012
Sauk	7,463	68.75%	3,151	29.03%	233	2.15%	9	0.08%	4,312	39.72%	10,856
Sawyer	2,551	70.86%	1,002	27.83%	31	0.86%	16	0.44%	1,549	43.03%	3,600
Shawano	6,125	74.49%	2,065	25.11%	26	0.32%	7	0.09%	4,060	49.37%	8,223
Sheboygan	13,330	54.65%	10,283	42.16%	757	3.10%	22	0.09%	3,047	12.49%	24,392
St. Croix	4,938	63.49%	2,799	35.99%	34	0.44%	6	0.08%	2,139	27.50%	7,777
Taylor	3,153	61.41%	1,750	34.09%	226	4.40%	5	0.10%	1,403	27.33%	5,134
Trempealeau	4,189	62.82%	2,446	36.68%	25	0.37%	8	0.12%	1,743	26.14%	6,668
Vernon	4,509	66.06%	2,299	33.68%	9	0.13%	9	0.13%	2,210	32.38%	6,826
Vilas	2,098	66.99%	1,015	32.41%	9	0.29%	10	0.32%	1,083	34.58%	3,132
Walworth	8,896	79.83%	2,212	19.85%	31	0.28%	4	0.04%	6,684	59.98%	11,143
Washburn	1,818	62.09%	1,099	37.53%	9	0.31%	2	0.07%	719	24.56%	2,928
Washington	7,789	74.69%	2,597	24.90%	39	0.37%	4	0.04%	5,192	49.78%	10,429
Waukesha	17,606	73.31%	6,227	25.93%	162	0.67%	20	0.08%	11,379	47.38%	24,015
Waupaca	7,930	79.06%	2,072	20.66%	24	0.24%	4	0.04%	5,858	58.40%	10,030
Waushara	3,362	81.25%	760	18.37%	15	0.36%	1	0.02%	2,602	62.88%	4,138
Winnebago	16,329	67.48%	7,756	32.05%	98	0.40%	16	0.07%	8,573	35.43%	24,199
Wood	9,189	66.36%	4,610	33.29%	37	0.27%	11	0.08%	4,579	33.07%	13,847
Totals	620,430	61.28%	378,772	37.41%	11,750	1.16%	1,552	0.15%	241,658	23.87%	1,012,504

== See also ==
- 1946 United States Senate elections
- McCarthyism

== Works cited ==
- Schmidt, Karl (1960). Henry A. Wallace: Quixotic Crusade 1948. Syracuse University Press. ISBN 978-0-8156-0020-6.
