= St. Mary's Parish (Appleton, Wisconsin) =

Roman Catholic parish in Wisconsin, United States

Coordinates: 44°15′32.5″N 88°24′48.1″W

St. Mary Parish
- St. Mary of the Seven Dolors
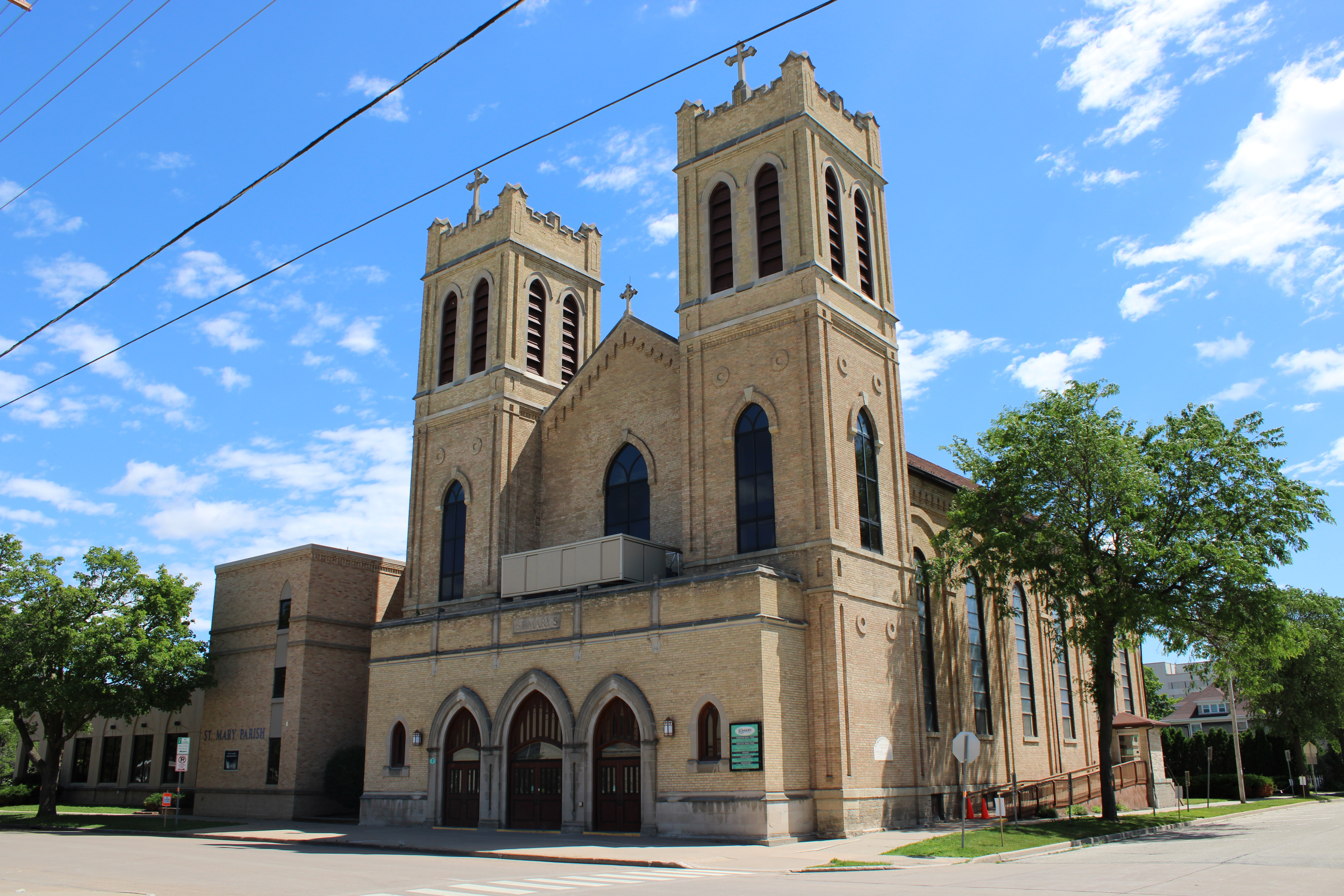
- St. Mary’s Church in 2026
- St. Mary Parish
- Location: Appleton, Wisconsin
- Country: United States
- Denomination: Roman Catholic
- Website: stmaryparish.org

Administration
- Province: Milwaukee
- Diocese: Green Bay, Wisconsin

St. Mary's Parish is a Roman Catholic parish in Appleton, Wisconsin, USA, in the Diocese of Green Bay.

Organized by Fr. J.N. Pfeiffer and the Irish Catholics of the area in 1859, St. Mary Parish was the first Roman Catholic church in Appleton. In 1860, a frame church was completed and dedicated to Mary, mother of Jesus under the title “St. Mary of the Seven Dolors”. U.S. Senator Joseph McCarthy is buried in the parish cemetery. Wisconsin State Assemblyman John Tracy and his family were attendees.
