= Mount Hope, Kansas =

City in Sedgwick County, Kansas

- City
- W. Main St. and N. Ohio St. in Mount Hope (2026)

- Location within Sedgwick County and Kansas

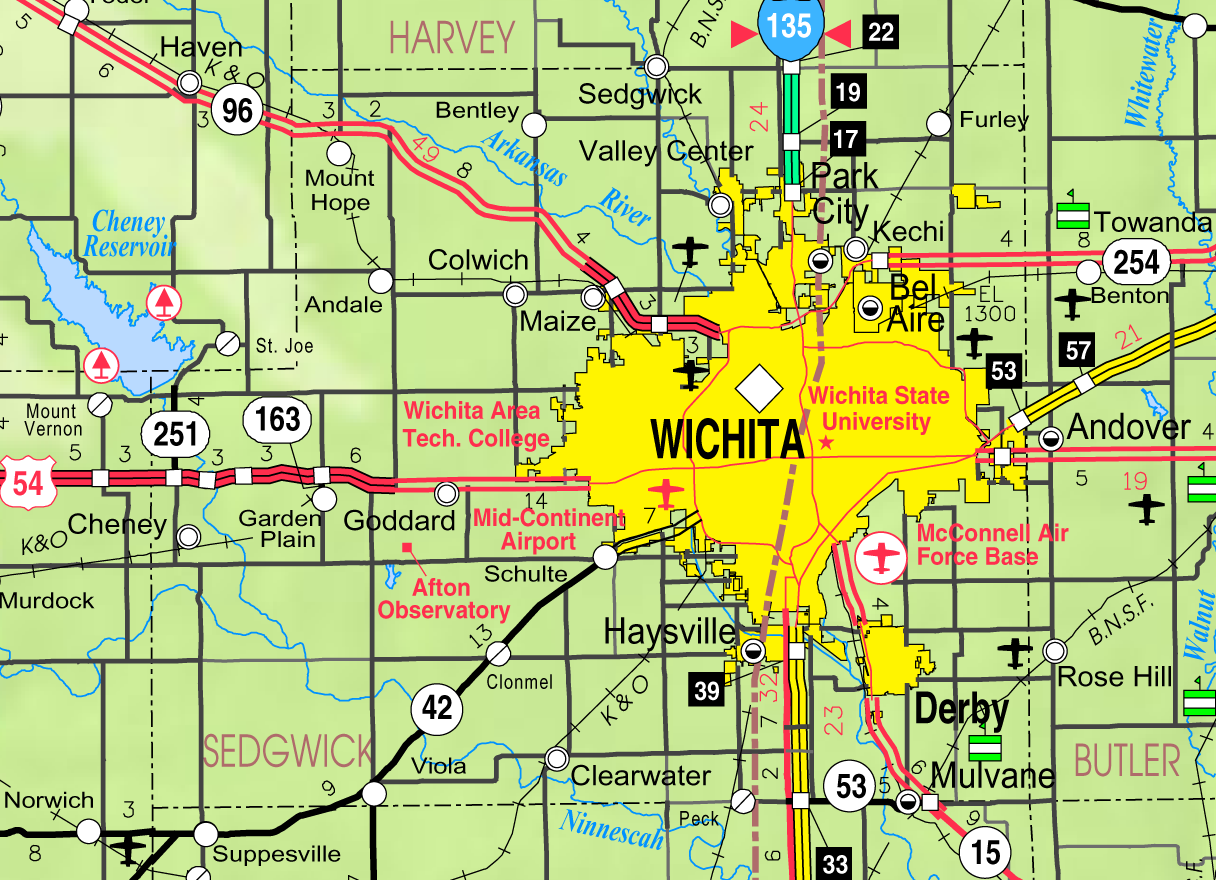
- KDOT map of Sedgwick County (legend)
- Coordinates: 37°52′9″N 97°39′53″W
- Country: United States
- State: Kansas
- County: Sedgwick
- Founded: 1874
- Incorporated: 1887

Government
  - Mayor: Terry Somers

Area
  - Total: 1.49 sq mi (3.86 km^{2})
  - Land: 1.47 sq mi (3.80 km^{2})
  - Water: 0.023 sq mi (0.06 km^{2})
- Elevation: 1,440 ft (440 m)

Population (2020)
  - Total: 806
  - Density: 549/sq mi (212/km^{2})
- Time zone: UTC-6 (CST)
  - Summer (DST): UTC-5 (CDT)
- ZIP Code: 67108
- Area code: 316
- FIPS code: 20-48900
- GNIS ID: 473810
- Website: mounthopecity.com

Mount Hope is a city in Sedgwick County, Kansas, United States. As of the 2020 census, the population of the city was 806.

== History ==
Mount Hope was founded in 1874.

== Geography ==
Mount Hope is located at 37°52′9″N 97°39′53″W (37.869198, -97.664663). According to the United States Census Bureau, the city has a total area of 1.48 square miles (3.83 km^{2}), of which 1.45 square miles (3.76 km^{2}) is land and 0.03 square miles (0.08 km^{2}) is water.

== Demographics ==
Historical population
| Census | Pop. | Note | %± |
|---|---|---|---|
| 1890 | 241 | | — |
| 1900 | 327 | | 35.7% |
| 1910 | 519 | | 58.7% |
| 1920 | 513 | | −1.2% |
| 1930 | 466 | | −9.2% |
| 1940 | 442 | | −5.2% |
| 1950 | 473 | | 7.0% |
| 1960 | 539 | | 14.0% |
| 1970 | 665 | | 23.4% |
| 1980 | 791 | | 18.9% |
| 1990 | 805 | | 1.8% |
| 2000 | 830 | | 3.1% |
| 2010 | 813 | | −2.0% |
| 2020 | 806 | | −0.9% |
U.S. Decennial Census

=== 2020 census ===
The 2020 United States census counted 806 people, 296 households, and 215 families in Mount Hope. The population density was 549.4 per square mile (212.1/km^{2}). There were 326 housing units at an average density of 222.2 per square mile (85.8/km^{2}). The racial makeup was 89.95% (725) white or European American (88.21% non-Hispanic white), 0.37% (3) black or African-American, 1.36% (11) Native American or Alaska Native, 0.62% (5) Asian, 0.0% (0) Pacific Islander or Native Hawaiian, 1.86% (15) from other races, and 5.83% (47) from two or more races. Hispanic or Latino of any race was 4.34% (35) of the population.

Of the 296 households, 33.8% had children under the age of 18; 57.1% were married couples living together; 20.6% had a female householder with no spouse or partner present. 24.0% of households consisted of individuals and 11.8% had someone living alone who was 65 years of age or older. The average household size was 2.8 and the average family size was 3.2. The percent of those with a bachelor's degree or higher was estimated to be 16.9% of the population.

24.3% of the population was under the age of 18, 5.5% from 18 to 24, 23.4% from 25 to 44, 23.8% from 45 to 64, and 23.0% who were 65 years of age or older. The median age was 41.0 years. For every 100 females, there were 101.5 males. For every 100 females ages 18 and older, there were 109.6 males.

The 2016–2020 5-year American Community Survey estimates show that the median household income was $65,357 (with a margin of error of +/- $18,121) and the median family income was $68,393 (+/- $17,120). Males had a median income of $47,917 (+/- $13,876) versus $23,750 (+/- $6,079) for females. The median income for those above 16 years old was $32,596 (+/- $8,470). Approximately, 4.8% of families and 6.3% of the population were below the poverty line, including 8.4% of those under the age of 18 and 3.6% of those ages 65 or over.

=== 2010 census ===
As of the census of 2010, there were 813 people, 313 households, and 206 families living in the city. The population density was 560.7 inhabitants per square mile (216.5/km^{2}). There were 348 housing units at an average density of 240.0 per square mile (92.7/km^{2}). The racial makeup of the city was 94.1% White, 0.4% African American, 1.4% Native American, 0.2% Asian, 2.1% from other races, and 1.8% from two or more races. Hispanic or Latino of any race were 4.7% of the population.

There were 313 households, of which 31.3% had children under the age of 18 living with them, 52.4% were married couples living together, 7.7% had a female householder with no husband present, 5.8% had a male householder with no wife present, and 34.2% were non-families. 28.8% of all households were made up of individuals, and 15.6% had someone living alone who was 65 years of age or older. The average household size was 2.47 and the average family size was 3.09.

The median age in the city was 43.8 years. 23.4% of residents were under the age of 18; 6.4% were between the ages of 18 and 24; 21.5% were from 25 to 44; 29.1% were from 45 to 64; and 19.6% were 65 years of age or older. The gender makeup of the city was 46.1% male and 53.9% female.

== Education ==
The community is served by Haven USD 312 public school district.

Mount Hope High School was closed through school unification. The Mount Hope Pirates won the Kansas State High School boys class B Track & Field championship in 1939.

== Transportation ==
Mount Hope had passenger rail service until at least fall 1964 on the Missouri Pacific Railroad, sitting on the line from Wichita to Geneseo. As of 2025, the closest passenger rail service is at the Hutchinson station, served by Amtrak's Southwest Chief.
