= Edward J. Samp =

Biographical details
- Born: July 7, 1889; Cecil, Wisconsin, U.S.
- Died: December 20, 1967 (aged 78); Madison, Wisconsin, U.S.

Playing career
- 1910–1912: Wisconsin
- Positions: Fullback, tackle

Coaching career (HC unless noted)

Football
- 1913: Hamilton
- 1914: Wisconsin (assistant)
- 1918: Williams

Accomplishments and honors

Awards
- All-Big Ten Conference (1912)

Edward Joseph Samp (July 7, 1889 – December 20, 1967) was an American college football player and coach and politician. In 1913, he became the head football coach at Hamilton College in Clinton, New York.

== College student and athlete ==
Samp attended the University of Wisconsin, where he was a member of Phi Beta Kappa. A talented athlete, he played baseball, rowed, and was an all-conference performer in football. Samp lettered in three season on the football team under coaches Thomas A. Barry, John R. Richards, and William Juneau. He played fullback for the 1910 and 1911 season, but moved to tackle for the 1912 season. This move helped the 1912 team to win the Western Conference title. After the season, he was named All-Western tackle as well as mentioned in Walter Camp's 1912 All-American review.

== College coach ==
After graduating from Wisconsin, Samp became head football coach of Hamilton College for the 1914 season. That season his squad won three games, lost four games, and tied one. The following year, he became an assistant football coach at his alma mater, the University of Wisconsin. In 1918 The New York Times reported that he had taken a head coach position at Williams College.

== Later life ==
Samp later went into real estate in Wisconsin. He ran for State Treasurer in the Republican primary against Solomon Levitan in 1930 as part of a movement to remove progressives from statewide office. He lost the vote by 360,110 to 219,915. After the election he continued to be involved in politics, including serving as State Republican Chairman. He died on December 20, 1967, at the age of 78.
