= Eli Hawks =

American politician and businessman

Eli Hawks (January 15, 1829 – April 10, 1900) was an American politician and businessman.

Born in Georgetown, New York in Madison County, New York, Hawks moved to Juneau, Wisconsin in 1855 and opened a grain elevator. He served as mayor and treasurer of Juneau, Wisconsin. In 1878 and 1883, Hawks served in the Wisconsin State Assembly as a Republican. He died in Juneau, Wisconsin.
