= Bank fraud =

Form of financial crime

Bank fraud is the use of potentially illegal means to obtain money, assets, or other property owned or held by a financial institution, or to obtain money from depositors by fraudulently posing as a bank or other financial institution. In many instances, bank fraud is a criminal offence.

While the specific elements of particular banking fraud laws vary depending on jurisdictions, the term bank fraud applies to actions that employ a scheme or artifice, as opposed to bank robbery or theft. For this reason, bank fraud is sometimes considered a white-collar crime.

== Types of bank fraud ==
=== Accounting fraud ===
Unprofitable or mismanaged businesses eager to hide serious financial problems may use fraudulent bookkeeping to overstate sales, income, profits, and assets. These fictitious records are then used to sell the company's bond or security issues or to obtain fraudulent loans, to delay the eventual collapse of the business. Examples of accounting frauds include the Enron scandal, World Com, and Ocala Funding. These companies regularly "cooked the books" to appear profitable when in fact they were deeply in debt.

==== Demand draft fraud ====
Demand draft (DD) fraud typically involves one or more corrupt bank employees. First, the employee removes a few DD leaves or books and write in a money value using the correct coding and punching, usually payable without debiting an account, at a city far away from the employee's home branch. The draft is cashed at the distant payable branch, and the fraud is discovered only after a branch-wide reconciliation which may take as long as six months, by which time the money is gone.

==== Remotely created check fraud ====
Remotely created checks are orders of payment created by the payee and authorized by the customer remotely, using a telephone or the internet by providing the required information including the MICR code from a valid check. They do not bear the signatures of the customers like ordinary cheques. Instead, they bear a legend statement "Authorized by Drawer". This type of instrument is usually used by credit card companies, utility companies, or telemarketers. The lack of signature makes them susceptible to fraud. The fraud is considered Demand Draft fraud in the US.

==== Uninsured deposits ====
A bank soliciting public deposits may be uninsured or not licensed to operate at all. The objective is usually to solicit for deposits to this uninsured "bank," although some may also sell stock representing ownership of the "bank." Sometimes the names appear very official or very similar to those of legitimate banks. For instance, the unlicensed "Chase Trust Bank" of Washington D.C. appeared in 2002, bearing no affiliation to its seemingly apparent namesake; the real Chase Manhattan Bank is based in New York. Accounting fraud has also been used to conceal other theft taking place within a company.

=== Bill discounting fraud ===
Essentially a confidence trick, a fraudster uses a company at their disposal to gain the bank's confidence, by posing as a genuine, profitable customer. To give the illusion of being a desired customer, the company regularly and repeatedly uses the bank to get payment from one or more of its customers. These payments are always made, as the customers in question are part of the fraud, actively paying any and all bills the bank attempts to collect. After the fraudster has gained the bank's trust, the company requests that the bank begin paying the company up front for bills it will collect from the customers later. Many banks will agree but are not likely to go whole hog right away. So again, business continues as normal for the fraudulent company, its fraudulent customers, and the unwitting bank. As the bank grows more comfortable with the arrangement, it will trust the company more and more and be willing to give it larger and larger sums of money up front. Eventually, when the outstanding balance between the bank and the company is sufficiently large, the company and its customers disappear, taking the money the bank paid up front and leaving no one to pay the bills issued by the bank.

==== Duplication or skimming of card information ====
This takes a number of forms, ranging from merchants copying clients' credit card numbers for use in later illegal activities or criminals using carbon copies from old mechanical card imprint machines to steal the info, to the use of tampered credit or debit card readers to copy the magnetic stripe from a payment card while a hidden camera captures the numbers on the face of the card.

Some fraudsters have attached fraudulent card stripe readers to publicly accessible ATMs to gain unauthorised access to the contents of the magnetic stripe as well as hidden cameras to illegally record users' authorisation codes. The data recorded by the cameras and fraudulent card stripe readers are subsequently used to produce duplicate cards that could then be used to make ATM withdrawals from the victims' accounts.

=== Cheque kiting ===
Cheque kiting exploits a banking system known as "the float" wherein money is temporarily counted twice. When a cheque is deposited to an account at Bank X, the money is made available immediately in that account even though the corresponding amount of money is not immediately removed from the account at Bank Y at which the cheque is drawn. Thus both banks temporarily count the cheque amount as an asset until the cheque formally clears at Bank Y. The float serves a legitimate purpose in banking, but intentionally exploiting the float when funds at Bank Y are insufficient to cover the amount withdrawn from Bank X is a form of fraud.

=== Forged or fraudulent documents ===
Forged documents are often used to conceal other thefts; banks tend to count their money meticulously so every penny must be accounted for. A document claiming that a sum of money has been borrowed as a loan, withdrawn by an individual depositor or transferred or invested can therefore be valuable to someone who wishes to conceal the fact that the bank's money has in fact been stolen and is now gone.

=== Forgery and altered cheques ===
Fraudsters have altered cheques to change the name (in order to deposit cheques intended for payment to someone else) or the amount on the face of cheques, simple altering can change $100.00 into $100,000.00. (However, transactions for such large values are routinely investigated as a matter of policy to prevent fraud.) In February 2023 the Financial Crimes Enforcement Network (FinCEN) warned of a nationwide surge in fraud involving cheques stolen from the mail, which may then be altered by "check washing": chemicals are used to remove the original ink so that the payee, and often the amount, can be replaced. Financial institutions in the United States filed more than 680,000 suspicious activity reports related to check fraud in 2022, nearly twice as many as in 2021.

Instead of tampering with a real cheque, fraudsters may alternatively attempt to forge a depositor's signature on a blank cheque or even print their own cheques drawn on accounts owned by others, non-existent accounts, etc. They would subsequently cash the fraudulent cheque through another bank and withdraw the money before the banks realise that the cheque was a fraud.

=== Fraudulent loan applications ===
These take a number of forms varying from individuals using false information to hide a credit history filled with financial problems and unpaid loans to corporations using accounting fraud to overstate profits in order to make a risky loan appear to be a sound investment for the bank.

=== Fraudulent loans ===
One way to remove money from a bank is to take out a loan, which bankers are more than willing to encourage if they have good reason to believe that the money will be repaid in full with interest. A fraudulent loan, however, is one in which the borrower is a business entity controlled by a dishonest bank officer or an accomplice; the "borrower" then declares bankruptcy or vanishes and the money is gone. The borrower may even be a non-existent entity and the loan is merely an artifice to conceal a theft of a large sum of money from the bank. This can also be seen as a component within mortgage fraud (Bell, 2010).

=== Empty ATM envelope deposits ===
A criminal overdraft can result due to the account holder making a worthless or misrepresented deposit at an automated teller machine in order to obtain more cash than present in the account or to prevent a check from being returned due to non-sufficient funds. United States banking law makes the first $100 immediately available and it may be possible for much more uncollected funds to be lost by the bank the following business day before this type of fraud is discovered. The crime could also be perpetrated against another person's account in an "account takeover" or with a counterfeit ATM card, or an account opened in another person's name as part of an identity theft scam. The emergence of ATM deposit technology that scans currency and checks without using an envelope may prevent this type of fraud in the future.

=== Identity theft or Impersonation ===
Identity theft operates by obtaining information about an individual, then using the information to apply for identity cards, accounts and credit in that person's name. Often little more than name, parents' name, date and place of birth are sufficient to obtain a birth certificate; each document obtained then is used as identification in order to obtain more identity documents. Government-issued standard identification numbers such as "social security numbers" are also valuable to the fraudster.

=== Money laundering ===
The term "money laundering" dates back to the days of Al Capone; money laundering has since been used to describe any scheme by which the true origin of funds is hidden or concealed.

Money laundering is the process by which large amounts of illegally obtained money (from drug trafficking, terrorist activity or other serious crimes) is given the appearance of having originated from a legitimate source.

=== Payment card fraud ===
Credit card fraud is widespread as a means of stealing from banks, merchants and clients.

=== Phishing or Internet fraud ===
Phishing, also known as Internet fraud, operates by sending forged e-mail, impersonating an online bank, auction or payment site; the e-mail directs the user to a forged web site which is designed to look like the login to the legitimate site but which claims that the user must update personal info. The information thus stolen is then used in other frauds, such as theft of identity or online auction fraud.

A number of malicious "Trojan horse" programmes have also been used to snoop on Internet users while online, capturing keystrokes or confidential data in order to send it to outside sites.

Fake websites can trick a visitor into downloading computer viruses that steal personal information. A visitor may encounter security messages claiming his machine has viruses and instructing him to download new software, which is actually a virus.

=== Prime bank fraud ===
"Prime bank" operations claim to offer an urgent, exclusive opportunity to cash in on the best-kept secret in the banking industry, with guaranteed deposits in "primebanks", "constitutional banks", "bank notes and bank-issued debentures from top 500 world banks", and "bank guarantees and standby letters of credit" which generate returns at no risk and are "endorsed by the World Bank" or various national governments and central bankers. However, these official-sounding phrases are known as "prime bank" fraud; they may sound great on paper, but the guaranteed offshore investment with the claims of an easy 100% monthly return are all fictitious financial instruments intended to defraud individuals.

=== Rogue traders ===
A rogue trader is a trader at a financial institution who engages in unauthorized trading, possibly to recoup a loss they incurred in earlier trades. In those instances, out of fear and desperation, they manipulate the internal controls to circumvent detection to buy more time.

Unauthorized trading activities invariably produce more losses due to time constraints; most rogue traders are discovered at an early stage with losses ranging from $1 million to $100 million, but a very few working out of institutions with extremely lax controls were not discovered until the loss had reached well over a billion dollars. Rogue traders may not have the intent to defraud their employers to enrich themselves, and may merely be trying to recoup their losses to make their firm whole again and salvage their employment.

Some of the largest unauthorized trading losses were discovered at Barings Bank (Nick Leeson), Daiwa Bank (Toshihide Iguchi), Sumitomo Corporation (Yasuo Hamanaka), Allfirst Bank (John Rusnak), Société Générale (Jérôme Kerviel), UBS (Kweku Adoboli), and JPMorgan Chase (Bruno Iksil).

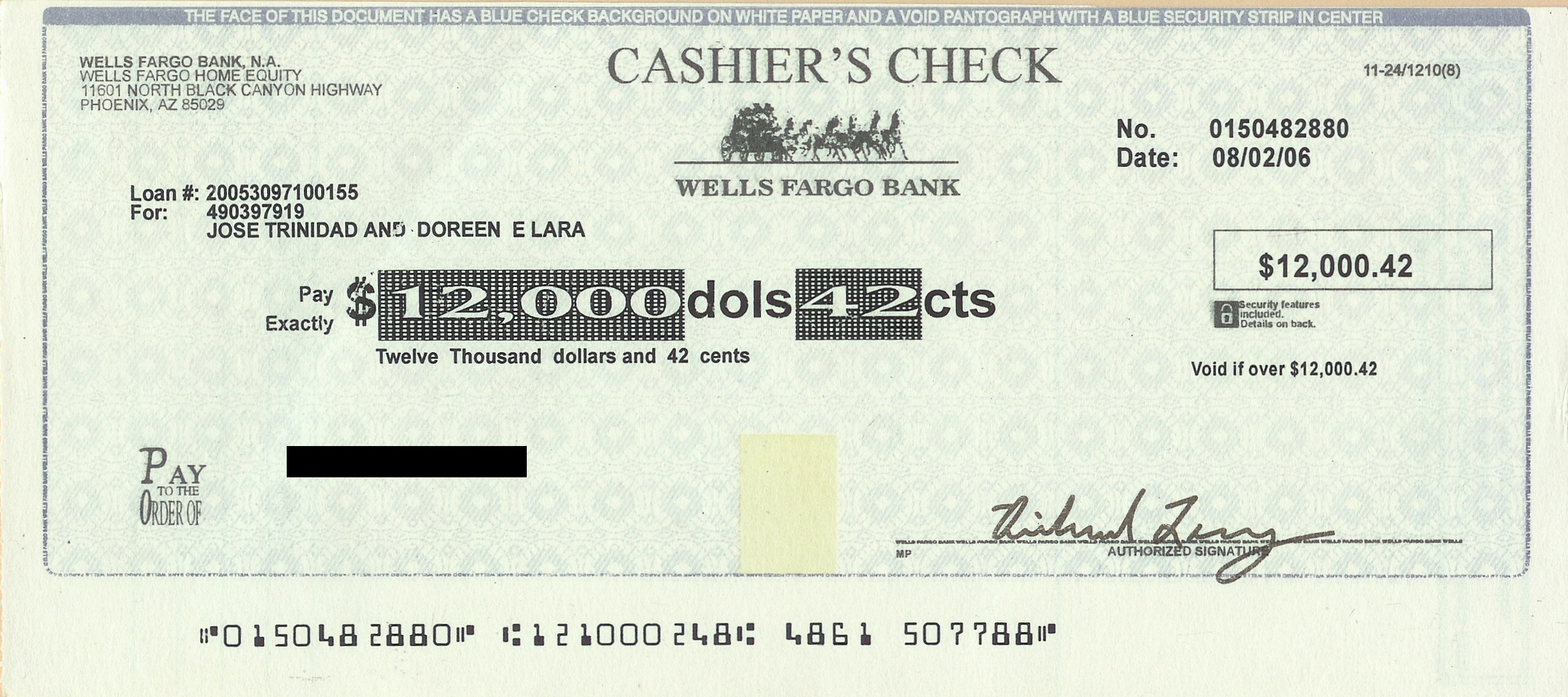
A scan of a counterfeit cashier's check that is made to appear to be issued by Wells Fargo Bank

=== Wire transfer fraud ===
Wire transfer networks such as the international SWIFT interbank fund transfer system can be tempting for fraudsters to target, due to the fact that a transfer, once made, is difficult or impossible to reverse. As these networks are used by banks to settle accounts with each other, rapid or overnight wire transfer of large amounts of money are commonplace; while banks have put checks and balances in place, there is the risk that insiders may attempt to use fraudulent or forged documents which claim to request a bank depositor's money be wired to another bank, often an offshore account in some distant foreign country.

There is high risk of fraud when dealing with unknown or uninsured institutions. The risk may be greatest when dealing with offshore or Internet banks (as this allows selection of countries with lax banking regulations), but is not by any means limited to these institutions. There exists an annual list of unlicensed banks on the US Treasury Department web site.

The period of time a wire transfer that must be routed through several countries may take may equally be exploited by an unscrupulous actor.

== Banking fraud by country ==
=== Australia ===
The Commonwealth Fraud Control Framework outlines the preventions, detection, investigation and reporting obligations set by the Australian Government for fraud control. The framework includes three documents called The Fraud Rule, Fraud Policy and Fraud Guidance

The Fraud Rule is a legislative instrument binding all Commonwealth entities setting out the key requirements of fraud control.

The Fraud Policy is a government policy binding non-corporate Commonwealth entities setting out the procedural requirements for specific areas of fraud control such as investigations and reporting.

The Fraud Guidance preventing, detecting and dealing with fraud, supports best practice guidance for the Fraud Rule and Fraud Policy setting out the government's expectations for fraud control arrangements within all Commonwealth entities.

Other important acts and regulations in the Australian Government's fraud control framework include the:

- CrimesAct 1914, which sets out criminal offences against the Commonwealth, such as fraud
- Criminal Code 1995, which sets out criminal offences against the Commonwealth, such as fraudulent conduct
- Public Service Act 1999 and the Public Service Regulations 1999, which provide for the establishment and management of the Australian Public Service and its employees
- Proceeds of Crime Act 2002 and the Proceeds of Crime Regulations 2002, which provide for the confiscation of the proceeds of crime.

=== United States ===
Under federal law, bank fraud in the United States is defined, and made illegal, primarily by the bank fraud statute in Title 18 of the U.S. Code. 18 U.S.C. § 1344 states:

Whoever knowingly executes, or attempts to execute, a scheme or artifice—
(1) to defraud a financial institution; or
(2) to obtain any of the moneys, funds, credits, assets, securities, or other property owned by, or under the custody or control of, a financial institution, by means of false or fraudulent pretenses, representations, or promises;
shall be fined not more than $1,000,000 or imprisoned not more than 30 years, or both.

State law may also criminalize the same, or similar acts.

The bank fraud statute was enacted by Congress in response to the Supreme Court's decision in Williams v. United States, 458 U.S. 279 (1982), in which the Court held that check-kiting schemes did not constitute making false statements to financial institutions (18 U.S.C. § 1014). Section 1344 has subsequently been bolstered by the Financial Institutions Reform, Recovery and Enforcement Act of 1989 (FIRREA), Pub. L. No. 101-73, 103 Stat. 500.

The bank fraud statute federally criminalizes check-kiting, check forging, non-disclosure on loan applications, diversion of funds, unauthorized use of automated teller machines (ATMs), credit card fraud, and other similar offenses. Section 1344 does not cover certain forms of money laundering, bribery, and passing bad checks. Other provisions cover these offenses.

The Supreme Court has embraced a broad interpretation of both of the numbered clauses within section 1344. The Supreme Court has held that the first clause only requires the prosecution to show that the crime involved accounts controlled by a bank; the prosecution need not show actual financial loss to the bank or intent to cause such loss. The Supreme Court has also held that the second clause does not require a showing of intent to defraud a financial institution.

In the United States, consumer liability for unauthorized electronic money transfers on debit cards is covered by Regulation E of the Federal Deposit Insurance Corporation. The extent of consumer liability, as detailed in section 205.6, is determined by the speed with which the consumer notifies the bank. If the bank is notified within 2 business days, the consumer is liable for $50. Over two business days the consumer is liable for $500, and over 60 business days, the consumer liability is unlimited. In contrast, all major credit card companies have a zero liability policy, effectively eliminating consumer liability in the case of fraud.

== Notable cases ==
- 1873 Bank of England forgeries
- Gone in 60 Seconds (bank fraud)
- 2014 Moldovan bank fraud scandal, $1 billion
- Russian Laundromat, $20–80 billion from 2010 to 2014
- The Resistance Banker, movie about WWII banker financing Dutch resistance
- San Francisco Department of Public Works corruption scandal, at least three people pleaded guilty or were convicted of bank fraud

== See also ==
- Advance fee fraud (Nigerian 419 scam)
- Alfredo Sáenz Abad
- Baninter case
- Carding (fraud)
- Cheque fraud
- FBI
- Mail and wire fraud
- Mortgage fraud
- Taylor, Bean & Whitaker – top-10 U.S. wholesale mortgage lending firm that ceased business following multibillion-dollar fraud revelations
- United States Secret Service
- Mary Carole McDonnell bank fraud case
