= Scan =

Scan, SCAN or Scanning may refer to:

== Science and technology ==
=== Computing and electronics ===
- Graham scan, an algorithm for finding the convex hull of a set of points in the plane
- 3D scanning, of a real-world object or environment to collect three dimensional data
- Counter-scanning, in physical micro and nanotopography measuring instruments like scanning probe microscope
- Elevator algorithm or SCAN, a disk scheduling algorithm
- Image scanning, an optical scan of images, printed text, handwriting or an object
- Optical character recognition, optical recognition of printed text or printed sheet music
- Port scanner, in computer networking
- scanf, a function for retrieving formatted input in the C programming language
- Prefix sum, an operation on lists that is also known as the scan operator
- Raster scan, the rectangular pattern of image capture and reconstruction in television
- Scan chain, a type of manufacturing test used with integrated circuits
- Scan line, one line in a raster scanning pattern
- Screen reading, on computers to quickly locate text elements and images
- Shared Check Authorization Network (SCAN), a database of bad check writers and collection agency for bad checks
- Space Communications and Navigation Program (SCaN), by NASA

=== Medical ===
- Schedules for Clinical Assessment in Neuropsychiatry (SCAN), a set of psychiatric diagnostic tools by WHO
- DMSA scan, a radionuclide scan used in kidney studies
- Medical imaging, of the interior of a body
  - Medical ultrasound, the medical procedure for examining internal structures, especially when applied to developing foetuses in the womb
  - CT scan (computed tomography scan)
  - Magnetic resonance imaging, MRI scan
- Switch access scanning, a technique that allows users with motor impairments to use a computer using switch access
- Partner-assisted scanning, a technique that allows a person with severe disabilities to communicate

== Businesses ==
- Scan Furniture, a former US chain in Washington, D.C., US
- SCAN Health Plan, not-for-profit health care company based in Long Beach, California, US
- Scan AB or Scan Foods UK Ltd, the Swedish and UK subsidiaries of the Finnish HKScan
- Seattle Community Access Network, a former TV channel in Seattle, Washington, US
- Scan (company), a software company based in Provo, Utah, US

== Publishing ==
- Social Cognitive and Affective Neuroscience, a scientific journal
- Scanning (journal), a scanning microscopy scientific journal published by Hindawi
- Scan: Journal of Media Arts Culture, former online journal published by Macquarie University, Sydney, Australia
- SCAN (newspaper), the student newspaper at Lancaster University, UK

== Other uses ==
- Scansion, in poetry
- Scan reading, a method of speed reading
- Scientific content analysis (SCAN), a disputed technique
- "Scan" (Prison Break episode), an episode of the television series Prison Break

== See also ==
- Scanner (disambiguation)
- Skan (disambiguation)
- Scansion, the analysis of writing and verse regarding rhythmic and especially metrical structure
