= Check kiting =

Form of check fraud

An example of a check, an instrument potentially used for kiting

Check kiting or cheque kiting (American and British English, respectively) is a form of bank check fraud, involving taking advantage of the float provided by a bank to make use of non-existent funds in a checking or other bank account. Thus, instead of being used as intended, as a negotiable instrument, checks are misused to source (and manage the flow and timing of) a form of unauthorized, unsecured, and illegal credit.

== History of the term ==
The term "check kiting" first came into use in the 1920s. It stemmed from a 19th century practice of issuing IOUs and bonds without any collateral. That practice became known as "flying a kite", as there was nothing to support the loan besides air.

== Description and varieties ==
Kiting is commonly defined as intentionally writing a check for a value greater than the account balance from an account in one bank, then writing a check from another account in another bank, also with non-sufficient funds, with the second check serving to cover the non-existent funds from the first account. The purpose of check kiting is to falsely inflate the balance of a checking account in order to allow written checks to clear that would otherwise bounce. If the account is not planned to be replenished, then the fraud is colloquially known as paper hanging. If writing a check with insufficient funds is done with the expectation they will be covered by payday it is called playing the float.

Some forms of check fraud involve the use of a second bank or a third party, often a place of retail, in order to delay the absence of funds in a transactional account on the day the check is due to clear at the bank. Such acts are frequently committed by bankrupt or temporarily unemployed individuals or small businesses seeking emergency loans, by start-up businesses or other struggling businesses seeking interest-free financing while intending to make good on their balances, or by pathological gamblers who have the expectation of depositing funds upon winning. It has also been used by those who have some genuine funds in interest-bearing accounts, but who artificially inflate their balances to increase the interest paid by their banks. Criminals have taken advantage of the check float to pass fraudulent checks through solicited users of online auctions.

=== Circular kiting ===
Circular kiting describes forms of kiting in which one or more additional banks serve as the location of float, and involve the use of multiple accounts at different banks. In its simplest form, the kiter, who has two or more accounts at different banks, writes a check on day one to themselves from bank A to bank B (this check is referred to as the kite), so funds become available that day at bank B sufficient for all checks due to clear. On the following business day, the kiter writes a check on their bank B account to themselves and deposits it into his account at bank A to provide artificial funds allowing the check they wrote a day earlier to clear. This cycle repeats until the offender is caught, or until the offender deposits genuine funds, thereby eliminating the need to kite, and usually going unnoticed.

Complex versions of this scheme have occurred involving two separate people, each with an account at a different bank, constantly writing checks to one another, or a group of individuals writing checks circularly, thereby making detection more difficult. Some kiting rings involve offenders posing as large businesses, thereby masking their activity as normal business transactions and making banks inclined to waive the limit of funds made available.

=== Retail-based kiting ===
Retail-based kiting involves the use of a party other than a bank to unknowingly provide temporary funds to an account holder lacking funds needed for check to clear. In these cases, the kiter writes checks to one or more places of retail (usually supermarkets) that offer cash back in addition to the amount of a purchase as a courtesy to their patrons. Following the transaction, the kiter deposits the cash received back into his/her bank on the same day in order to provide sufficient funds for other check to clear, while the check written that day will clear one or more business days later. This action is repeated as necessary until legitimate funds can be deposited into the account.

The principal basis of retail kiting is that by giving cash (which is immediately available, and whose deposits clear faster than checks do) in exchange for a check, the retail establishment is providing check-cashing services and taking credit risk on the check – it may be dishonored. Another version of this scheme involves purchasing an item from a place of retail with a check, and returning it promptly for a cash refund, followed by depositing that cash into the transactional account. This is more difficult these days, as more places of retail will delay a refund on purchases made by check.

Retail kiting is more common in suburban areas, where multiple supermarket chains exist within proximity. While it is more difficult to detect and prosecute, it involves lesser amounts of cash than circular kiting, and therefore is a lower threat.

==== Example ====
For example, suppose an individual has $10 in a bank account and no cash, but wishes to purchase an item costing $100. Here is how the fraud could be accomplished:

1. The individual first writes Check #1 (a bad check) for $100, and uses it to purchase the item. The check will clear (i.e., the check amount will be deducted from his account) at the end of the next business day (say Check #1 is written on day T−1). The individual is now technically insolvent, as they owe $100, but only have $10 in the bank. This fact is not known, however, as the check has not yet been presented for payment. This will occur on day T+0.
2. In order to cover the first check, on day T+0 the individual goes to a retail establishment and writes Check #2 to purchase an item, and gets an additional $100 cash back by writing the check for more than the value of the item purchased. Check #2 is written on day T+0 – this is the kite.
3. The individual then deposits the $100 so the account now has $110, which is sufficient for Check #1 to clear, but after this there are non-sufficient funds for Check #2 (the kite) to clear.
4. This process can be repeated, with the amount possibly increasing (as in a Ponzi scheme).
5. If the individual then gets $100 in cash on day T+1 and deposits it in their account, Check #2 clears and the retail establishment victims who accepted the bad check do not in fact lose money, and remain unaware.
6. If, on the other hand, the individual does not get enough cash and does not continue kiting, then Check #2 (or some further check, if this has continued a few iterations) bounces, and the retail establishment has been defrauded – the consequences for accepting the bad check is the $100 cash loss plus the cost of the product the individual fraudulently purchased.

=== Corporate kiting ===
Corporate kiting involves the use of a large kiting scheme involving perhaps millions of dollars to secretly borrow money or earn interest. While limits are often placed on an individual as to how much money can be deposited without a temporary hold, corporations may be granted immediate access to funds, which can make the scheme go unnoticed. This was the case with E. F. Hutton & Co. in the early 1980s.

== Legal implications of check kiting ==
Check kiting is illegal in many countries. However, most countries do not have a float system and checks are not paid until they are cleared, so check kiting is impossible.

=== United States ===
According to the United States Department of Justice, check kiting can be prosecuted under several existing laws including those against bank fraud (18 U.S.C. § 1344), misapplication (18 U.S.C. § 656), or required entries (18 U.S.C. § 1005). It can draw a fine of up to $1,000,000.00, imprisonment for up to 30 years, or both, and many first-time offenders with no criminal background have received stiff sentences. In addition to the federal penalties, state law often provides for alternate civil and criminal consequences.

Although the United States prosecutes some paper hangers under federal law, most issuance of bad checks in the United States is prosecuted as a state offense.

Laws vary from state to state, but one example is Ohio Revised Code 2913.11(2)(B), which states: "No person, with purpose to defraud, shall issue or transfer or cause to be issued or transferred a check or other negotiable instrument, knowing that it will be dishonored or knowing that a person has ordered or will order stop payment on the check or other negotiable instrument". Ordinarily, passing a bad check in Ohio is a misdemeanor, but large checks or multiple checks within a six-month period aggregating to large amounts make it a 5th-, 4th-, or 3rd-degree felony, depending on the amounts involved.

Some states protect the careless by making the intent to defraud an element of the crime, or exempting from punishment those that pay the check later. For example, Indiana's check deception statute states that it is a defense if the person issuing the check "pays the payee or holder the amount due, together with protest fees and any service fee or charge, ... within ten (10) days after the date of mailing by the payee or holder of notice to the person that the check, draft, or order has not been paid by the credit institution." Furthermore, it is not a crime if "the payee or holder knows that the person has insufficient funds to ensure payment or that the check, draft, or order is postdated", or "insufficiency of funds or credit results from an adjustment to the person's account by the credit institution without notice to the person."

== See also ==
- Bank fraud
- Check fraud
- Credit card kiting
- Federal Bureau of Investigation (FBI)
- United States Secret Service
