= Skan (disambiguation) =

Škaŋ is the motion of the universe in Lakota tradition.

Skan or SKAN may also refer to:

== People ==
- David "Skan" Bichard, Australian punk musician, member of Carpathian (band)
- Christina Skan, Swedish brewer, founder of Wermlands Brygghus
- Martin Skan, English hotelier, former owner of Chewton Glen
- Ralph Skan, English singer, soloist on Peace (Libera album)
- Sylvia Skan (1897–1972), English mathematician
- Skan Srisuwan, artist for video game No More Heroes III and other games

== Places ==
- SKAN, abbreviation for Saint Kitts and Nevis
- SKAN, ICAO airport code for Andes Airport in Andes, Colombia

== Other uses ==
- Škan, American extreme metal band
- Skan (album), 1979, by UK band Twelfth Night
- Skan', a kind of Russian jewelry art
- SKAN, abbreviation for Russian bandy club SKA-Neftyanik
- Skan, fictional character in 2003 animated film The Rain Children
- The sKan, cancer detection device, winner of 2017 James Dyson Award

== See also ==
- Scan (disambiguation)
- Fenno–Skan, power transmission cable between Sweden and Finland
- Konti–Skan, power transmission cable between Sweden and Denmark
