= Cheque fraud =

Criminal acts involving unlawful use of cheques

Cheque fraud (Commonwealth English) or check fraud (American English) is a category of criminal acts that involve the unlawful use of cheques to illegally acquire or (effectively) to borrow funds that do not exist within an account balance or account-holder's legal ownership. Most methods involve taking advantage of the float (the money made available by a bank for a time between the presentation or negotiation of the cheque, and its clearance at the cheque writer's financial institution) so as to draw out or permit access to funds. Specific kinds of cheque fraud include cheque kiting, where funds are deposited before the end of the float period to cover the fraud, and paper hanging, where the float offers the opportunity to write fraudulent cheques but the account is never replenished. In the United States, the FBI's Internet Crime Complaint Center received 18,774 complaints in 2025 under its "Credit Card/Check Fraud" category, which groups card and cheque fraud together, with reported losses of $282,670,235.

== Types of cheque fraud ==
=== Cheque kiting ===
Cheque kiting full refers to use of the float to take advantage and delay the notice of non-existent funds.

=== Embezzlement ===
While some cheque kiters fully intend to bring their accounts into good standing, others, often known as paper hangers, have pure fraud in mind, attempting to "take the money and run."

==== Bad cheque writing ====
A cheque is written to a merchant or other recipient, hoping the recipient will not suspect that the cheque will not clear. The buyer will then take possession of the cash, goods, or services purchased with the cheque, and will hope the recipient will not take action or will do so in vain.

==== Cheque conversion ====
A cheque is endorsed by a non-payee of the cheque and then cashed or deposited fraudulently. The non-payee will then have cash free and clear, and will hope the true recipient will not find out until much later.

==== Abandonment ====
The paper hanger deposits a cheque one time that they know is bad or fictitious into their account. When the bank considers the funds available (usually on the next business day), but before the bank is informed the cheque is bad, the paper hanger then withdraws the funds in cash. The offender knows the cheque will bounce, and the resulting account will be in debt, but the offender will abandon the account and take the cash.

Such crimes are often used by petty criminals to obtain funds through a quick embezzlement, and are frequently conducted using a fictitious or stolen identity in order to hide that of the real offender.

This form of fraud is the basis for the Nigerian cheque scam and other similar schemes; however, in these cases, the victim will be the one accused of committing such crimes, and will be left to prove their innocence.

=== Forgery ===
Sometimes, forgery is the method of choice in defrauding a bank. There are three main types of cheque forgery:

- Counterfeit. This is a cheque that has been created on non-bank paper to look genuine. It relates to a genuine account.
- Forged signature. The cheque is genuine, but the signature is not that of the account holder.
- Fraudulently altered. In this case a genuine cheque has been made out by the genuine customer but it has been altered by a fraudster, typically by altering the recipient’s name or by adding words and/or digits in order to inflate the amount. In England and Wales, section 64 of the Bills of Exchange Act 1882 provides that where a bill or an acceptance is materially altered without the assent of all parties liable on the bill, the bill is made void except when used against a party who has himself made, authorised or assented to the alteration, and subsequent endorsers.

Other cases include that of Frank Abagnale, where the perpetrator passes or attempts to pass a cheque that has been manufactured by themself, but which represents a non-existent account.

=== Unusual cases ===
Cheque washing involves the theft of a cheque in transit between the writer and recipient, followed by the use of chemicals to remove the ink representing all parts other than the signature. The perpetrator then fills in the blanks to his or her advantage. In February 2023 the Financial Crimes Enforcement Network (FinCEN) alerted financial institutions in the United States to what it described as a nationwide surge in cheque fraud involving cheques stolen from mail handled by the United States Postal Service; such cheques may be altered or "washed" to change the payee and often the amount. According to FinCEN, financial institutions filed over 680,000 suspicious activity reports about possible cheque fraud in 2022, almost twice as many as in 2021.

Sometimes the cheque fraud comes from an employee of the bank itself, as was the case with Suzette A. Brock, who was convicted of theft for writing five corporate cheques to her own birth name from her desk as a loan servicing agent for Banner Bank of Walla Walla, WA.

The most notorious "bad cheque artist" of the 20th century, Frank Abagnale, devised a scheme to put incorrect MICR numbers at the bottom of the cheque he wrote, so that they would be routed to the incorrect Federal Reserve Bank for clearing. This allowed him to work longer in one area before his criminal activity was detected. In the movie Catch Me If You Can, which outlines Abagnale's crime spree, it shows Abagnale soaking plastic Pan Am airplanes in his bathtub and removing the Pan Am insignia decals from the toys. He would then place the decals on the bad cheques he was writing while pretending to be a Pan Am pilot. The film depicts Abagnale amassing over $2.5 million, while in reality he collected just under $1,500.

== Combating cheque fraud ==
In most jurisdictions, passing a cheque for an amount of money the writer knows is not in the account at the time of negotiation (or available for overdraft protection) is usually considered a violation of criminal law. However, the general practice followed by banks has been to refrain from prosecuting cheque writers if the cheque reaches the bank after sufficient funds have been deposited, thereby allowing it to clear. But the account holder is normally held fully liable for all bank penalties, civil penalties, and criminal charges allowable by law in the event the cheque does not clear the bank.

Only when the successful clearance of a cheque is due to a kiting scheme does the bank traditionally take action. Banks have always had various methods of detecting kiting schemes and stopping them in the act. Computer systems in place will alert bank officials when a customer engages in various suspicious activities, including frequently depositing cheques bearing the same, large monthly total deposits accompanied by near-zero average daily balances, or avoidance of tellers by frequent use of ATMs for deposits.

New technology in place today may end most forms of cheque kiting and paper hanging. As new software rapidly catches illegal activity at the teller/branch level instead of waiting for the nightly runs to the back office, schemes are not only easier to detect, but may be prevented by tellers who deny customers illegal transactions before they are even started.

Part of how banks are combating cheque fraud is to offer their clients fraud protection services. Because it is impossible for banks to know every cheque that a customer writes and which may or may not be fraudulent, the onus is on the clients to make the bank aware of what cheques they write. These systems allow customers to upload their cheque files to the bank including the cheque number, the amount of money, and in some cases, the payee name. Now, when a cheque is presented for payment, the bank scrubs it against the information on file. If one of the variables does not match, then the cheque would be flagged as a potentially fraudulent item.

These services help with external fraud but they do not help if there is internal fraud. If an employee sends information to the bank with fraudulent items, then the bank would not know to deny payment. A system of dual controls could be put into place in order to not allocate all capabilities to one person.

Before the passage of the Check Clearing for the 21st Century Act, when cheques could take three or more days to clear, playing the float was fairly common practice in the US in otherwise-honest individuals who encountered emergencies right before payday.

Circular and abandonment frauds are gradually being eliminated as cheques will clear in Bank B the same day they are deposited into Bank A, giving no time at all for non-existent funds to become available for withdrawal. With image-sharing technology, the funds that temporarily become available in Bank A's account are wiped out the same day.

While there may still be some room for retail kiting, security measures taken by retail chains are helping reduce such incidents. Increasingly, more chains are limiting the amount of cash back received, the number of times cash back can be offered in a week or a given period of time, and obtaining transactional account balances before offering cash back, thereby denying it to those with low balances. For example, Walmart's policy is to determine account balances of those obtaining cash back, and some Safeway locations will not offer cash back on any accounts with balances under $250, even when funds are sufficient to cover the amount on the cheque. Customers who are noted to obtain cash back frequently are also investigated by the corporation to observe patterns.

Some businesses will also use the cheque strictly as an informational device to automatically debit funds from the account, and will return the item to the customer thereafter. However, in the United States this is done through the ACH Network; though faster than traditional cheque clearing, contrary to popular belief the ACH Network is not instantaneous. Though this practice reduces the room for kiting (by reducing float), it does not always eliminate it.

== 2024 Chase Bank glitch ==
In August and September of 2024, a viral "money hack", which was actually a form of cheque fraud, circulated on TikTok claiming that Chase Bank account holders could give themselves large amounts of money by writing a cheque, cashing it, and quickly withdrawing the money from an ATM. This was not actually the result of a true glitch in the banking system but rather an exploitation of standard check float time.

JPMorgan Chase, the parent company of Chase Bank, has sued people who withdrew money from its ATMs in this way. Of its first lawsuits, one concerns a person who deposited a counterfeit check for $335,000, then tried to withdraw over $290,000 in cash.

== See also ==
- Advance-fee scam
- Bad check restitution program
- Bank fraud
- ChexSystems
- Federal Bureau of Investigation
- House banking scandal
- Qchex
- United States Secret Service
- White-collar crime
