= Scanner =

Scanner may refer to:

== Technology ==
=== For invisible radiation ===
- Scanner (radio), for searching for and receiving radio broadcasts
- Scanner, a rotating radar antenna
- Neutron scanner, a scanner which utilizes neutrons to analyze objects

=== For (near) light ===
- Image scanner, which digitizes a two-dimensional image
  - 3D scanner, which digitizes the three-dimensional shape of a real object
- Motion picture film scanner, which scans original film for storage as a digital file
- Barcode reader, which reads the data encoded in a barcode
- Laser scanner, which guides a laser beam along a path, sometimes combined with a measurement
- Stepper, a part of the photolithography process
- Scanner, an automated stage light

=== Security ===
- Biometric device, an identification and authentication device
  - Face scanner
  - Iris scanner
  - Retinal scanner
  - Fingerprint scanner
- Full body scanner

=== Computing ===
- Port scanner, in computer networking
- Virus scanner
- Vulnerability scanner, a computer program that probes for weaknesses
- Lexical scanner, a computer program or component of a program that breaks up its input into lexical tokens
- Scanner, a class in various programming languages for fetching input from streams, such as the standard input stream

=== Medical ===
- CT scanner
- MRI scanner
- PET scanner
- X-ray scanner

=== Other ===
- Scan tool, an automotive electronic control unit diagnostic tool

== Arts and entertainment ==
=== Film and television ===
- Scanner (Code Lyoko), a fictional teleportation device in the animated series Code Lyoko
- Scanners, a 1981 science fiction horror film
- "Scanners" (Superstore), an episode of the television series Superstore

=== Music ===
- Scanner (band), a German speed metal band
- British electronic musician Robin Rimbaud (stage name "Scanner")
- Scanners (band), an alternative band from London

=== Other ===
- Scanner (Half-Life), a floating enemy in the Half-Life video game series
- Scanners (Alexander McQueen collection), a 2003 fashion collection
- "Scanners Live in Vain", science fiction story written in 1945 by Cordwainer Smith
- Skannerz, a line of electronic toys

== See also ==
- WikiScanner, a tool that provided a searchable database of anonymous Wikipedia edits
- Scan (disambiguation)
- Scanners (disambiguation)
