= Shared Check Authorization Network =

Shared Check Authorization Network (SCAN) is a database of bad check writers and closed bank accounts in the United States. The database is used by retailers in order to reduce the number of bad checks received. The database keeps track of those who have written outstanding bad checks to any retailer using the system, and retailers can determine, based on these records, whether or not to accept a check from a particular accountholder.

Retailers using the SCAN system have at least one scanner in the store, and often one at every register, that is used to scan checks that are written. The scanner reads the account number and compares it with the database of checking account numbers for which bad checks have been written to any participating retailer and not repaid. If the account number matches one in the system, the retailer will be notified, and will not likely accept the check.

SCAN also operates a collection service on bad checks that are written.

== See also ==
- Bad check restitution program
- Check fraud
- ChexSystems
