= Unavailable funds fee =

An unavailable funds fee is a penal fee applied by a bank to a client's transaction account when a transaction is posted to the said account that has a negative available balance, regardless of if the account factually contains a positive physical balance. The fee is distinct from a non-sufficient funds fee, as there is a positive physical balance but some or all the funds are on hold (meaning that the balance is not yet available).

Bank fees such as the unavailable funds fee are contentious and have been the subject of some debate. Consumer advocacy groups have criticised them as opaque and unfair and that they particularly penalise the poor and fees do not reflect the banks' costs. The banks argue that it is a penalty, not a transaction fee. These fees have become a major source of income for banks, replacing the traditional account and transaction fees which in many countries have disappeared.

== Governance ==
=== United States ===
Not all overspending fees are officially defined or regulated in the United States. It is up to the individual bank to decide if the Unavailable Funds Fee should be applied, instead, it could dishonour the payment to avoid a customer getting into a position where the fee applies.

== See also ==
- Bank charge
- Non-sufficient funds
