= Gone in 60 Seconds =

Gone in 60 Seconds may refer to:

- Gone in 60 Seconds (1974 film), an action film written, directed, produced by and starring H.B. "Toby" Halicki
  - Gone in 60 Seconds (2000 film), a remake of the 1974 film, directed by Dominic Sena, and starring Nicolas Cage and Angelina Jolie
    - Gone in 60 Seconds (soundtrack), a soundtrack album from the 2000 film
- Gone in 60 Seconds (bank fraud), a 2012 ATM theft scheme targeting Citibank
- Gone in Sixty Seconds (Casualty), a webisode of the British medical drama Casualty
