= Bank fee =

Fees charged by banks for various services

A bank fee or a bank charge includes charges and fees made by a bank to their customers exclusive of interest payments. In common parlance, the term often relates to charges in respect of personal current accounts or checking account.

These charges may take many forms such as monthly charges for the provision of an account, specific transaction charges such as withdrawal and transfer fees, ATM usage fees, debit card fees for doing a card transactions above a preset limit per month, credit card fees, loan establishment fees, early termination fees, and minimum account balance fees. They also include overdraft fees or non-sufficient funds (NSF) fees for exceeding authorized overdraft limits, or making payments (or attempting to make payments) where no authorized overdraft exists.

== History ==
A bank's main source of income is interest charges on lending, but bank fees have been a minor yet important part of a bank's income since the early days of banking. Bank fees were initially designed to recover the cost of processing transactions such as cheques. The overdraft fee was also designed as a penalty for unauthorised lending from the bank, but regulators and governments have pushed back against fees that are designed as penalties. Consumer laws in a number of countries have forced banks to not charge fees beyond what is reasonably necessary to recover their costs.

In general, bank fees have been declining due to the digitalisation of banking and economies of scale. However, new transaction fees have been introduced as new payment methods have been developed, such as credit card fees and interchange fees.

== See also ==
- Credit card fee
- Interchange fee
- Origination fee
- Overdraft
- Overdraft fee
- OFT v Abbey
- Unavailable funds fee
