= 1873 Bank of England forgeries =

- Date: 21 January – 28 February 1873
- Location: London, England
- Type: Bank fraud, forgery
- Convicted: Austin Bidwell, George Bidwell, George MacDonnell, Edwin Noyes

From 21 January to 28 February 1873, four American con-artists defrauded the Bank of England of £102,217, equivalent to nearly £10 million in 2015. The four men responsible for the Bank of England forgeries, brothers George and Austin Bidwell, George MacDonnell and Edwin Noyes were convicted at the Old Bailey and sentenced to life imprisonment. The discovery of the crime, and the subsequent investigations and trials, received widespread attention at the time, with the London Times describing it as one of the "most skillful attempts to prey upon the complex organization of modern commerce."

== Background ==
The men responsible were already experienced fraudsters prior to the Bank of England forgeries. George Bidwell, 33 at the time of the forgeries, had been sentenced to two years imprisonment in 1865 for his part in defrauding grocers in West Virginia. His brother Austin Bidwell, 25 at the time of the forgeries, was already a notorious bank forger in the United States. George MacDonnell, a Harvard graduate, had previously been carrying out extensive forgery operations in New England and was incarcerated at Sing Sing where he became acquainted with the Bidwell brothers, who were also serving time there.

After their release, the Bidwell brothers and MacDonnell began carrying out various forgery operations. Using forged letters of credit, the three men defrauded banks across the United States and Europe. After a forgery campaign in Brazil, the three men headed over to England in 1872 to begin their scheme to defraud the Bank of England. George Bidwell contacted Edwin Noyes in New York, who joined the group in London for the scam.

== Crime ==
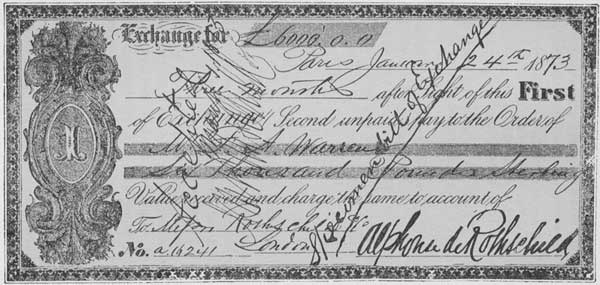
An 1873 bill of exchange, England.

The scam began with Austin Bidwell setting up a deposit account with a branch of the Bank of England under the pretense of opening a pullman car manufacturing business in the region, so as not to raise suspicion of his large financial transactions. For months prior to the fraud, Bidwell behaved as an ordinary customer, depositing genuine bills that had been secured by George Bidwell and MacDonnell into the account. Then from 21 January to 28 February 1873, the group forged and cashed over 94 bills of exchange worth over £100,000, which were then transferred to the Continental Bank. Noyes acted as the delivery man for the group, exchanging the funds obtained from the forged cheques for US bonds and gold.

== Arrests and trials ==
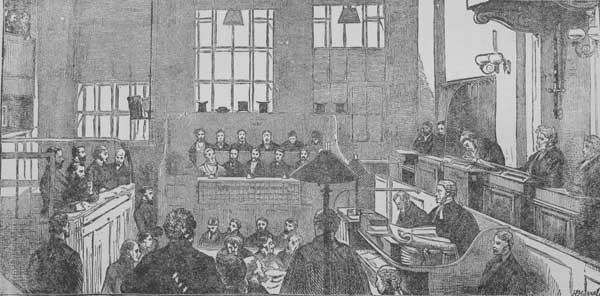
The trial of the four Americans at the Old Bailey, London.

The forgeries were discovered on 28 February 1873, when the bank contacted the alleged issuer of a banknote for the date of issue that had been omitted from the transactions the forgers had made that day. Noyes was arrested the next day, while making another deposit at the Continental Bank. The remaining conspirators had fled England; MacDonnell was arrested in New York, Austin Bidwell was apprehended in Havana, Cuba, and George Bidwell was arrested in Edinburgh, Scotland. All four men were convicted and sentenced to life imprisonment, although George Bidwell was later released in 1887 due to poor health, and Austin Bidwell was released in 1892. MacDonnell and Noyes were released a few months later and resumed their criminal careers in the United States. George and Austin Bidwell both wrote and self-published memoirs. The Bidwell brothers died within weeks of each other while promoting Austin's book in Butte, Montana, in March 1899.
