= Credit card kiting =

Form of credit card fraud

Credit card kiting refers to the use of one or more credit cards to obtain cash and purchasing power they do not have, or pay credit card balances with the proceeds of other cards. Unlike check kiting, which is illegal under nearly all circumstances, laws against credit card kiting are not completely prohibitive of the practice, thereby allowing it to be done to some degree. It is up to the banks to detect the practice and when necessary, stop it.

In order for prosecution to occur in a credit card kiting scheme, a bank must prove intent to deceive.

== Methods ==
=== Introductory rates ===
Many credit cards offer introductory rates, which in some cases, could be as low as 0% to which balances from other cards can be transferred. In theory, this enables the endless transfer of balances between cards, and since so many offers are available, this could be carried out for a long period of time. But many banks now have become aware of this practice, and introductory rates are offered only a limited number of times. Credit card companies also charge fees for balance transfers, usually 3%. In this case, the kiter is delaying legally due balances, and potentially, interest payable to the credit card bank.

=== Cash advances ===
Cash advances can be obtained from most credit cards, which can be used to pay off balances or loans. Though there are fees and higher interest rates for obtaining these loans, if a card has a high credit limit or no limit at all, this in theory could be used to pay off the previous balance while adding to the interest. In this case, the kiter is delaying legally due balances, and potentially, interest payable to the credit card bank; or, in the cited extreme case, using the credit card proceeds to earn interest at both banks' expense.

=== Self payment ===
Many payment services, such as PayPal and Square, allow people to receive credit card payments for low prices, which could be made to oneself. These could be used to pay off balances. In this case, the kiter is creating cash while avoiding legally entitled cash advance fees. This is a violation of PayPal and Square Terms of Service contracts and agreements.
