= Bad check restitution program =

Check fraud debt collection

A bad check restitution program (BCRP) is a program in some places in the United States that works to retrieve funds from bad check writers in order to repay moneys owed to the recipients of the checks. In other words, these are debt collection operations. Many of these programs are operated by private companies that add fees that may exceed $200, regardless of the amount of the check. They call these operations "bad check enforcement," or "bad check restitution," or "bad check diversion." The private companies send check writers letters which state basically, that to avoid being prosecuted, the check writer may enroll in an expensive diversion program. In most instances, the prosecution threats are false and made only to coerce payment of high fees. Sometimes, these programs are actually run in house directly by prosecutors offices.

In the US very few states have laws that specifically permit district attorneys to allow private collection agencies to collect checks in the district attorney's name. About half of all U.S. states offer some type of Bad Check Restitution Program, and these services vary in many ways. Some accept non-sufficient funds (NSF), and closed account checks while others may accept stopped payment checks and markers. It will also be noted that most have time limits (checks may need to be less than 90 or 180 days old and most need to be at least 30 days old and have had to have notice to check maker that the check has been returned unpaid with a demand for payment in a specified time). Some will not accept checks that were written under certain circumstances, including a post-dated check, one that the check writer asked the recipient to hold, or one that was written as an extension of credit.

== Methods ==
A Bad Check Diversion Program generally pursues the bad check writer by stating (typically from the local District Attorney's office) that the check writer has committed a criminal act, and is subject to prosecution. The check writer is told that s/he may avoid prosecution by meeting the guidelines of the program, which generally include the payment of all monies owed to the victim, a program fee, and in some jurisdictions, participation in a course designed to improve the check writer's habits.

Typically, the letters are sent to the check writer without a prosecutor ever having reviewed any evidence or considered whether the check writer committed a crime. These are highly automated operations in which large retailers and collection agencies transmit masses of computer data directly to the private company that is trying to collect the check, using the prosecutor's name and authority. Generally, enrollment in the program is not an admission of guilt to a crime, and will not result in criminal charges being filed or a criminal record. The check writer is told that if s/he successfully completes all program requirements, the case against him/her dismissed without any possibility of arrest, criminal charges or a record thereafter.

Bad Check Restitution Programs compete directly with private collection agencies. They claim that they can recover more successfully than private collection agencies, because they have "the power of the DA brand." They help businesses recover hundreds of thousands of dollars each year throughout the United States. Most Prosecutor offices try to make these programs free to taxpayers (i.e. bad check collection is funded by fees paid by bad check writers).

== Criticism of BCRPs ==
According to law enforcement agencies and district attorneys, BCRPs are diversion programs operated by the county, state, or other jurisdiction that are responsible for collecting funds owed to victims. They claim the purpose is to recover the losses of the victims.

Many consumer advocates oppose the actions of BCRPs, particularly those operated by private, for-profit companies, stating that bad check writing is not a crime unless the check writer actually intended to defraud the recipient. The writer of the bad check is told that the use of the program is optional, but is falsely threatened that the options are to participate, or risk going to jail. The writer is usually informed within the letter that entering the program is not necessary, and it is permissible to stand trial, even though no charges have been, or are likely to be filed.

Sometimes the program is handled internally by the law enforcement agency itself, which often generates a substantial portion of its overall budget from the check fees that it collects. In many cases, the law enforcement agency signs up with a private collection agency. The private company essentially pays the law enforcement agency a small portion of the fees it collects in exchange for permission to send demand letters on official law enforcement agency letterhead and to threaten to prosecute check writers who do not pay up to $200 in fees, plus the check itself. This is when, in most instances, there is no criminal case to dismiss, and no law enforcement official has reviewed the check writer's file to even determine if there is/was evidence of a crime.

These programs have been criticized in news journals across the country as being unfair, unethical, predatory and possibly illegal. In 2013 in Massachusetts, the prosecutors who used these programs suspended their operations when questions were raised in a Boston Globe investigation. In November 2014, the American Bar Association issued a Formal Opinion, finding that it was unethical for prosecutors to allow these companies to use prosecutor letterhead, because it was "abusive" to convey "the impression that the machinery of the criminal justice system has been mobilized" against the consumer, who is led to believe that he or she may face jail time unless the collector gets paid.

== Lawsuits against BCRPs ==
In most states, it is not a crime to write a check that does not clear, unless at the time the check is written, the check writer knows that it will not clear, and is intending to defraud the merchant. Criminal intent may be determined by circumstantial evidence, such as an established pattern of writing bad checks and not paying them, or writing a series of checks on a closed account. The check writer's explanation for why the check did not clear must be considered in deciding whether there was criminal intent.

A number of lawsuits have been filed challenging the legality of these programs. In a lawsuit in Iowa, the check diversion company agreed to refund money to class members. A federal court in Michigan ruled that the private company was violating the Fair Debt Collection Practices Act by using district attorney letterhead and falsely threatening consumers with arrest. A federal court in Sacramento, California ruled that the person who ran the private company violated the Fair Debt Collection Practices Act and California law by charging unlawful fees, pretending to be the district attorney's office and making false threats to have check writers arrested., and later awarded about $750,000 in damages. A federal court in San Jose, California ruled that the two individuals that made millions from the company they owned had violated both the Fair Debt Collection Practices Act and the California Unfair Competition Law by charging fees for a diversion class and imposing other fees, by impersonating the district attorney's office in their communications with check writers, and by falsely claiming that check writers who did not pay those fees would be prosecuted. After a trial in which both the plaintiffs and defendants complained about the verdict, the judge in the case vacated the parties later settled for an undisclosed sum. In another California case, the federal court in San Francisco approved a $3,250,000 settlement. In 2014, a new lawsuit was filed against in Washington, alleging violations of the Fair Debt Collection Practices Act and the Washington Consumer Protection Act. In December 2014, consumers filed a lawsuit against Corrective Solutions in California. Then, in March 2015, the Consumer Financial Protection Bureau filed a lawsuit against National Corrective Group, Inc. and related entities, and obtained a consent order prohibiting these companies from masquerading as the prosecutor and making phony prosecution threats.

== See also ==
- Shared Check Authorization Network
- ChexSystems
- Cheque fraud
