= Qchex =

Defunct website for sending checks

Qchex was a website that allowed people to create and send checks drawn on any bank so long as they provided the ABA routing transit number and account number and a valid email address. The "Qchex" could then be e-mailed and printed out by the recipients.

On September 25, 2006, United States District Judge William Q. Hayes, responding to a Federal Trade Commission lawsuit alleging that Qchex's practice of e-mailing personal checks without verifying the identity of the check-writers resulted in widespread fraud, ordered the practice halted. The FTC said it had received over 600 complaints from consumers who say the practice was used to fraudulently withdraw money from their accounts, including using federal agencies, like the FTC itself.

Qchex's website itself advised that people register with Qchex to ensure that "no one else can set up or access your account numbers on the Qchex system."

In September 2005, the FTC had stated that Qchex's security practices had been haphazard and ineffective. Qchex continued to refuse to add verification procedures, and continued to offer their service despite the FTC's involvement and more than 600 complaints from consumers who reported their accounts as being illegally debited. Sept. 27, 2006 Qchex had suspended service until further notice in agreement and response to an FTC request. The defendants named in this case were Neovi Inc., doing business as Neovi Data Corp. and Qchex.com; G7 Productivity Systems Inc., doing business as Qchex.com; and their principals, James M. Danforth and Thomas Villwock. All the defendants were based in San Diego, Calif.

== See also ==
- Internet fraud
- Fraud
