= Stop payment =

Request to cancel a payment

A stop payment is an order by a customer of a financial institution (bank, savings bank, or credit union) or to a money order issuer to refuse to pay a check or draft drawn on the customer's account, and to return the draft to the depositor unpaid.

Stop payments are used in cases where the depositor does not want the check to be paid. The reasons can include:

- The customer has a dispute with the party that the check was given to, and wants to withhold payment.
- The check was lost or stolen.
- The check was forged or the amount was raised.
- The customer does not have enough money to cover the check (typically, a stop payment on a check has less of a dishonorable appearance than a check that bounces).

Stop payments are charged a fee by the customer's financial institution, usually the same as a fee for a bounced check. The customer can usually call their financial institution to ask for an immediate stop payment to be issued, with the requirement they come in within a few days and sign a written order.
