= Skan' =

Russian jewelry art form

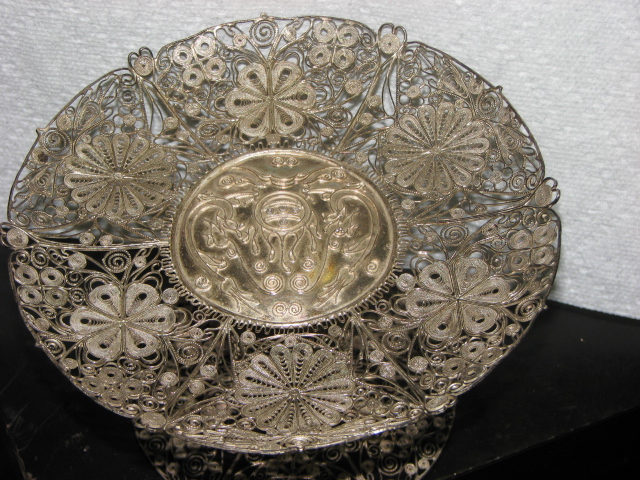
A skan'

A skan' (Old Russian: съкань, s''kan', which is in turn from the verb съкати, s''kati, "twist", "twist into a single or a few strands") is the Russian counterpart of a filigree. It is a kind of jewelry art with a thin layer of gold, silver or copper wire wound in cords or soldered on a metal background. Skan's are often supplemented by tiny silver or gold beads and enamel.

== History ==
In the Ancient Rus' skan' techniques were already used in the 9th to the 10th century. The wire-twisting technique was not yet in use at this time. Instead, grains (tiny beads of silver or gold) were used. Products from the 12th to the 13th centuries are of high quality, with an increasing appearance of soldered skan's. Open work and relief patterns appeared in the 12th on steel products with gems.

The greatest success of Moscow skan' came in the 15th to the 16th century, and used a variety of materials including gems, enamel, wood, and carved bones. The most famous skan' makers at that time were Ambrosy and Ivan Fomin.

Skan's were seen in many art centers of Russia in the 18th to the 19th centuries. It was considered a great work of art, together with small items such as bowls, salt shakers and boxes. They were produced using steel, crystal, and large pearls. Since the 19th century, industrial production of many household items with the use of various technologies has taken the lead, producing dishes, church utensils and toiletries.

During the Soviet era, skan's were widely used in the art industry, with production in various sites throughout the USSR. These sites not only manufactured skan's, but also household items such as delicate vases, coasters, miniature sculptures and such.
