= SCAN Health Plan =

American health insurance company

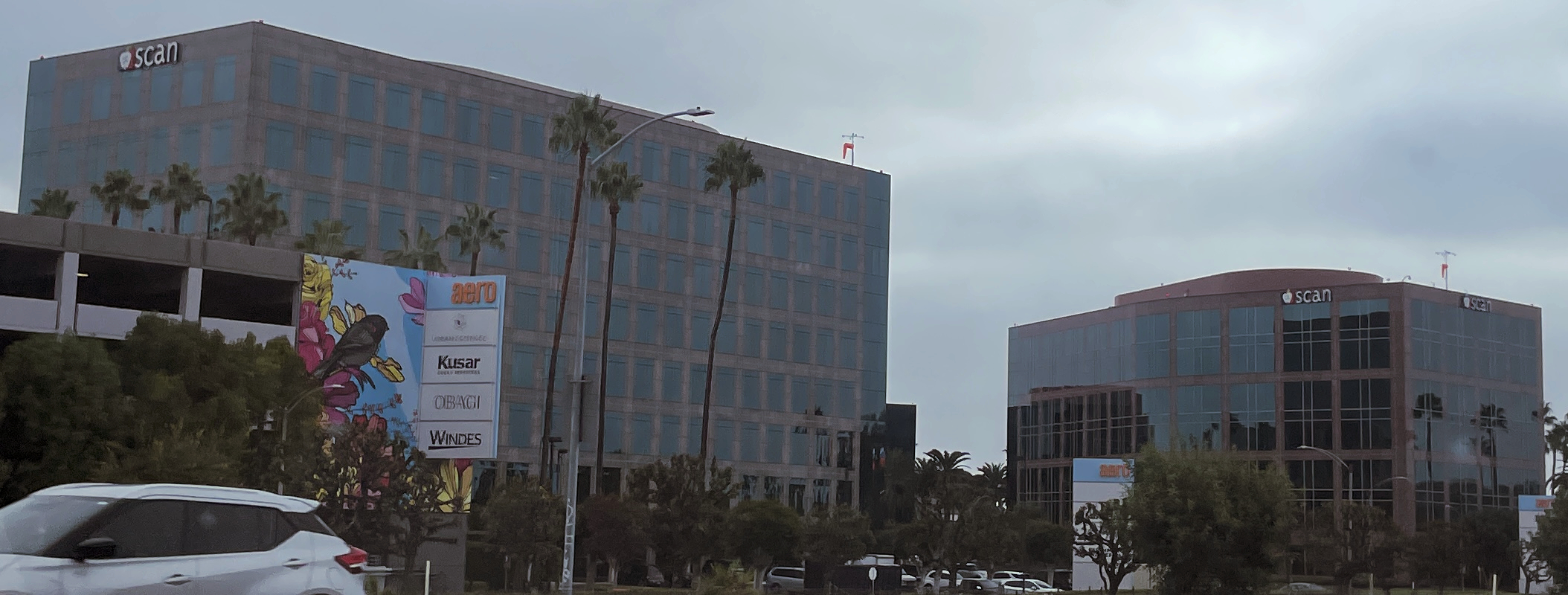
- Corporate headquarters in Long Beach, California
- Type: not-for-profit
- Industry: healthcare
- Founded: 1977
- Founder: Senior Care Action Network
- Headquarters: Long Beach, California
- Key people: Sachin H. Jain, MD, MBA, FACP, Chief Executive Officer
- Revenue: $3.5 billion (2021)
- Total assets: US$861 million (2021)
- Number of employees: 1,465
- Website: www.scanhealthplan.com

SCAN Health Plan (SCAN) is a not-for-profit, Medicare Advantage based in Long Beach, California. Founded in 1977, SCAN provides healthcare coverage to Medicare beneficiaries in California, Arizona, Texas, Nevada, New Mexico and Washington serving more than 440,000 members. It is one of the largest not-for-profit Medicare Advantage plans in the country. SCAN Health Plan is part of SCAN Group.

== Early history ==
The Senior Care Action Network, or SCAN, was created based on the proposal developed by the team at USC. (The new network was briefly known as the Long Beach Geriatric Healthcare Council, Inc., before changing its name to SCAN.) Their healthcare delivery model was centered on assessing each senior's needs on an individual level in order to coordinate appropriately for each unique case, providing specific social services and medical care through a network of local agencies, community providers and hospitals.

== Multipurpose Senior Services Program ==
In 1979, the state of California selected SCAN as one of eight sites for the state's Multipurpose Senior Services Program (MSSP). This program exists to help elderly Medi-Cal recipients in the Long Beach area stay out of nursing institutions as long as possible by providing home-based services to deliver the care they need. For the last 40 years, SCAN has served California's most at-risk seniors as one of the state's 62 MSSP sites through Independence at Home, a community service of SCAN.

== Social HMO ==
Until 1983, SCAN had been relatively unknown outside of Long Beach. That changed when it was awarded a contract from the federal government as one of four sites nationwide to pilot the Social Health Maintenance Organization (SHMO) demonstration program. The SHMO concept expanded what SCAN was already doing (offering home-based services so seniors could avoid or delay nursing home placement) to also include the at-risk elderly enrolled in Medicare and provide healthcare coverage to other Medicare beneficiaries.

In November 1984, under a three-and-a-half-year contract with the federal government, SCAN was officially licensed as a health plan in California. In March 1985, it began enrolling members in its Social HMO. Congress renewed the SHMO demonstration project five times before the program was ended in 2004.

== Growth and expansion ==
Between 1996 and 1998, SCAN more than doubled its membership by expanding into three Southern California counties (Orange, Riverside and San Bernardino).

When the government ended the SHMO program, SCAN continued to operate as a Medicare Advantage plan, offering Medicare beneficiaries healthcare coverage and services beyond what the federal program alone would cover. SCAN continued to grow, extending its service area and membership as it expanded in both Southern and Northern California.

In 2021 SCAN grew by more than 60,000 members, in large part due to the popularity of its Embrace Venture plan, a product that offered a Medicare Part B premium give-back. The give-back was offered during a period of heightened inflation in order to ease the economic burden many seniors faced.

SCAN's growth during this period was also fueled by its expansion into three Arizona counties (Maricopa, Pima and Pinal) and Clark County, Nevada, marking the first time SCAN expanded its reach beyond California into two states simultaneously.

During the 2022 Annual Enrollment Period, SCAN's membership grew to more than 285,000 people. That growth was fueled by the launch of a range of new products including: Affirm, the first ever LGBTQ+ Medicare Advantage plan and SCAN's expansion into Texas and Nye County, Nevada.

In late 2022, SCAN announced that it and CareOregon had entered into a definitive agreement to combine as a mission-driven not-for-profit healthcare organization under the name HealthRight Group. In a press release, the organization wrote, "HealthRight will bring together the expertise and resources of two nationally renowned organizations to improve access for people traditionally underserved by the US healthcare system." Pending regulatory approval, the combined entity will have revenues of $6.8B and will serve nearly 800,000 health plan members through its Medicare and Medicaid managed care offerings. The companies cancelled the merger in February 2024.

== Quality of care ==
In 2022, SCAN Health Plan received an overall rating of 4.5 out of 5 stars.* for the sixth year in a row. The only Medicare Advantage plan in California to do so. This 5-star Quality Rating is given by the Centers for Medicaid and Medicare Services (CMS) and is based on SCAN's offered plans (except SCAN Healthy at Home, an HMO Special Needs Plan; and VillageHealth, an HMO-POS Special Needs Plan).

*Medicare evaluates plans based on a 5-star rating system. Star ratings are calculated each year and may change from one year to the next.

In 2022, SCAN was also named to U.S. News & World Report's 2023 list of Best Medicare Advantage Companies for the fifth consecutive year.

The plan also achieved a 91%-member satisfaction rating for 2023, according to the Centers for Medicare & Medicaid Services (CMS). It is the fifth year in a row that SCAN has scored 90% or higher.

Overall, SCAN's California CMS Star rating announced by CMS in October 2023 reflected a decline to 3.5 from 4.5 stars. SCAN led successful litigation against CMS and its STAR rating was restored to 4 stars, reflecting 11 years in a row that SCAN had achieved > 4 star rating. SCAN’s industry leadership resulted in improved payments to more than 60 health plans affecting > 1m beneficiaries.

== Coverage by counties ==
Starting in 2026, SCAN provides healthcare coverage to more than 310,000 Medicare beneficiaries in 32 counties in Arizona, California, Nevada, New Mexico, Texas and Washington .

Arizona	Maricopa County Pima County Pinal County
California	Alameda County Fresno County Kings County Los Angeles County Madera County Placer County Orange County Riverside County Sacramento County San Bernardino County San Diego County San Francisco County San Joaquin County San Mateo County Santa Clara County Stanislaus County Tulare County Yolo County
Nevada	Clark County Nye County
New Mexico	Bernalillo County Sandoval County
Texas	Bexar County Harris County Fort Bend County Montgomery County
Washington	Pierce County Spokane County Thurston County

== Community benefits ==
Independence at Home (IAH), a community service of SCAN Health Plan, provides intensive care management for low-income seniors and builds community capacity to serve older adults. The services are provided through various county and state contract programs, the largest of which is the Multipurpose Senior Services Program and programs funded by SCAN Health Plan to support its mission of keeping seniors healthy and independent. IAH also provides a resource and referral line to connect seniors and their caregivers to needed services and support in Los Angeles, Orange, Riverside and San Bernardino counties and a virtual senior center for older adults in all the communities served by SCAN Health Plan.

== Diversification ==
Beginning in 2020, SCAN began a diversification program through its SCAN Group parent organization aimed at developing to deliver evidence-based, patient-centered care to older adults. Beginning in 2021, SCAN launched four new companies:

- Healthcare in Action, a medical group that provides care and services to older adults and other vulnerable individuals experiencing homelessness.
- Welcome Health, a primary care medical group that treats older adults through a combination of virtual and in-home visits.
- Homebase Medical, a medical practice that provides palliative care, chronic disease management, care transition management, and in-depth personal health assessments to people in their homes. Homebase Medical, which was launched after SCAN's 2022 acquisition of The Residentialist Group, serves SCAN Health Plan members as well as members of other health plans.
- myPlace Health, an integrated care delivery organization that will specialize in providing personalized care to older adults who wish to remain living in their homes and communities for as long as possible and which delivers care through the PACE (Program for All-Inclusive Care for the Elderly) model and as a value-based provider working in partnership with local health plans.
