= Overdraft =

Payments from a bank account exceeding the balance

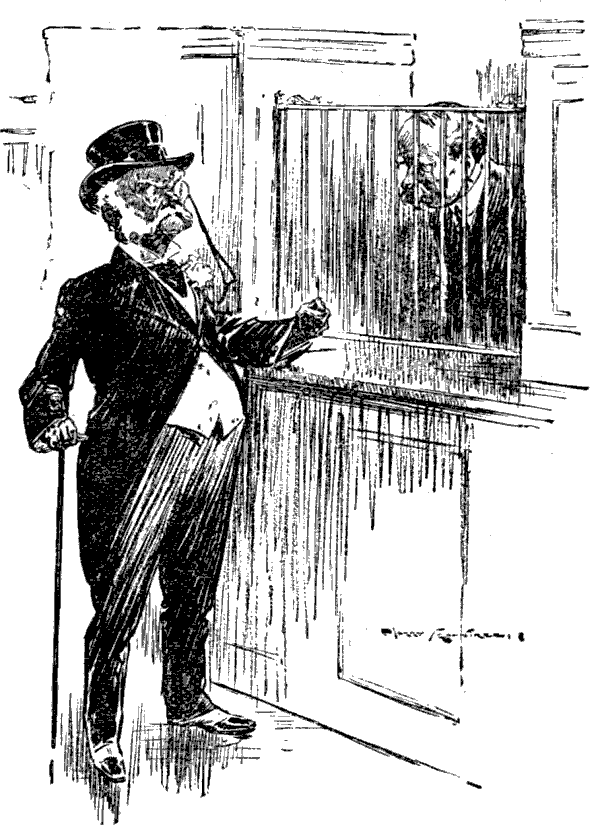
"I warn you, Sir! The discourtesy of this bank is beyond all limits. One word more and I – I withdraw my overdraft!" Cartoon from Punch Magazine Vol. 152, June 27, 1917

An overdraft occurs when something is withdrawn in excess of what is in a current account. For financial systems, this can be funds in a bank account. In these situations the account is said to be "overdrawn". In the economic system, if there is a prior agreement with the account provider for an overdraft, and the amount overdrawn is within the authorized overdraft limit, then interest is normally charged at the agreed rate. If the negative balance exceeds the agreed terms, then additional fees may be charged and higher interest rates may apply.

By analogy, overdrafting of an aquifer refers to extraction of water faster than it will be replenished.

== History in finance ==
The first overdraft facility was set up in 1728 by the Royal Bank of Scotland. The merchant William Hogg was having problems in balancing his books and was able to come to an agreement with the newly established bank that allowed him to withdraw money from his empty account to pay his debts before he received his payments. He was thus the first recipient of cash credit from a bank in the world. Within decades, the advantages of this system, both for customers and banks, became apparent, and banks across the United Kingdom adopted this innovation.

With the onset of industrialization, new businesses needed an easy form of credit to jump-start their activities, without having to take out loans on securities they did not necessarily have. The importance of this new financial innovation was recognized by the philosopher David Hume who described it in one of his essays as "one of the most ingenious ideas that has been executed in commerce".

== Reasons for overdrafts ==
Overdrafts occur for a variety of reasons. These may include:

- Intentional loan – The account holder finds themselves short of money and knowingly makes an insufficient-funds debit. They accept the associated fees and cover the overdraft with their next deposit.
- Failure to maintain an accurate account register – The account holder fails to accurately account for activity on their account and overspends through negligence.
- ATM overdraft – Banks or ATMs may allow cash withdrawals despite insufficient availability of funds. The account holder may or may not be aware of this fact at the time of the withdrawal. If the ATM is unable to communicate with the cardholder's bank, it may automatically authorize a withdrawal based on limits preset by the authorizing network.
- Temporary deposit hold – A deposit made to the account can be placed on hold by the bank. This may be due to Regulation CC (which governs the placement of holds on deposited checks) or due to individual bank policies. The funds may not be immediately available and lead to overdraft fees.
- Unexpected electronic withdrawals – At some point in the past the account holder may have authorized electronic withdrawals by a business. This could occur in good faith of both parties if the electronic withdrawal in question is made legally possible by terms of the contract, such as the initiation of a recurring service following a free trial period. The debit could also have been made as a result of a wage garnishment, an offset claim for a taxing agency or a credit account or overdraft with another account with the same bank, or a direct-deposit chargeback in order to recover an overpayment.
- Merchant error – A merchant may improperly debit a customer's account due to human error. For example, a customer may authorize a $5.00 purchase which may post to the account as $500.00. The customer has the option to recover these funds through chargeback to the merchant.
- Chargeback to merchant – A merchant account could receive a chargeback because of making an improper credit or debit card charge to a customer or a customer making an unauthorized credit or debit card charge to someone else's account in order to "pay" for goods or services from the merchant. It is possible for the chargeback and associated fee to cause an overdraft or leave insufficient funds to cover a subsequent withdrawal or debit from the merchant's account that received the chargeback.
- Authorization holds – When a customer makes a purchase using their debit card without using their PIN, the transaction is treated as a credit transaction. The funds are placed on hold in the customer's account reducing the customer's available balance. However, the merchant does not receive the funds until they process the transaction batch for the period during which the customer's purchase was made. Banks do not hold these funds indefinitely, and so the bank may release the hold before the merchant collects the funds, thus making these funds available again. If the customer spends these funds, then, barring an interim deposit, the account will overdraw when the merchant collects for the original purchase.
- Bank fees – The bank charges a fee unexpected to the account holder, creating a negative balance or leaving insufficient funds for a subsequent debit from the same account.
- Playing the float – The account holder makes a debit with insufficient funds in the account, believing he will be able to deposit sufficient funds before the debit clears. While many cases of playing the float are done with honest intentions, the time involved in the cheque's clearing and the difference in the processing of debits and credits are exploited by those committing cheque kiting.
- Returned cheque deposit – The account holder deposits a cheque or money order and the deposited item is returned due to non-sufficient funds, a closed account, or being discovered to be counterfeit, stolen, altered, or forged. As a result of the cheque chargeback and associated fee, an overdraft results or a subsequent debit which was reliant on such funds causes one. This could be due to a deposited item that is known to be bad, or the customer could be a victim of a bad cheque or a counterfeit cheque scam. If the resulting overdraft is too large or cannot be covered in a short period of time, the bank could sue or even press criminal charges.
- Intentional fraud – An ATM deposit with misrepresented funds is made or a cheque or money order known to be bad is deposited (see above) by the account holder, and enough money is debited before the fraud is discovered to result in an overdraft once the chargeback is made. The fraud could be perpetrated against one's own account, another person's account, or an account set up in another person's name by an identity thief.
- Bank error – A cheque debit is posted for an incorrect amount due to human or computer error, so an amount different from the maker intended may be removed from the account. Some bank errors can work to the account holder's detriment, but others could work to their benefit.
- Victimization – The account may have been a target of identity theft. This could occur as the result of demand-draft, ATM-card, or debit-card fraud, skimming, cheque forgery, an "account takeover", or phishing. The criminal act could cause an overdraft or cause a subsequent debit to cause one. The money or cheques from an ATM deposit could also have been stolen or the envelope lost or stolen, in which case the victim is often denied a remedy.
- Intraday overdraft – A debit occurs in the customer's account resulting in an overdraft which is then covered by a credit that posts to the account during the same business day. Whether this actually results in overdraft fees depends on the deposit-account holder agreement of the particular bank.
- Merchant overdraft – An unsecured overdraft offered by financial institutions to a merchant, and the amount overdrawn is within the authorized overdraft limit, which is usually of very high value.

== United Kingdom ==
Banks in the UK normally offer an overdraft facility free of charge, subject to a pre-arranged limit (formerly known as an authorized overdraft limit). Interest, fees or both would normally be charged if the facility is used but accounts may have an interest-free buffer of a few tens of pounds or a higher deliberate feature of a few hundred pounds interest free.

When a transaction would exceed the previously agreed overdraft limit the bank can choose either to decline the transaction or to accept it as an informal request for an increase, formerly often known as an unauthorized overdraft. Charges and interest rates for informal increases will often exceed those for a formal request. There is also normally a fee per declined transaction, often subject to monthly caps. Usually, the bank sends out a letter informing the customer of the charge and requesting that the account be operated within its limits from that point onwards or informing the customer of their new limit. In a BBC Whistleblower programme on the practice, it was noted that the actual cost to the bank was less than two pounds.

Accounts exist with overdraft protection facilities which guarantee that the bank will not allow an informal overdraft and which may have lower charges for refusing transactions, protecting the customer from the interest and charges which would be incurred if an overdraft was granted. Accounts for those under eighteen years old will not normally permit an overdraft to be created.

=== Amount of fees ===
==== Pre-April 2020 ====
No major UK bank completely dropped informal overdraft charges. Some, however, offered a "buffer zone", where customers will not be charged if they are over their limit by less than a certain amount. Other banks tended to charge fees regardless of the amount of the level of the overdraft, which was seen by some as unfair. In response to criticism, Lloyds Banking Group changed its fee structure; rather than a single monthly fee for an unauthorized overdraft, they now charge per day. They also allow a 'grace period' where an account holder can pay money in before 2:30pm on a weekday before any items are returned. Alliance & Leicester formerly had a buffer zone facility (marketed as a "last few pounds" feature of their account), but this has been withdrawn.

In general, the fee charged for an informal request was between £25 and £30, along with an increased rate of debit interest. The charges for cheques and Direct Debits which were refused (or "bounced") due to insufficient funds were usually the same as or slightly less than the general overdraft fees, and can be charged on top of them. A situation which has provoked much controversy is the bank declining a cheque/Direct Debit, levying a fee which takes the customer overdrawn and then charging them for going overdrawn. However, some banks, like Halifax, had a "no fees on fees" policy whereby an account that goes overdrawn solely because of an unpaid item fee will not be charged an additional fee.

==== 2020 reform ====
In 2019, the Financial Conduct Authority announced that the overdraft market was being reformed with effect from April 2020.

This reform introduced the following measures

- Arranged and unarranged overdraft rates to be the same
- End to daily charges rate to be an APR
- Introduced guidance on refused payment fees to bring in to line with actual costs
- Identify customers in financial difficulty and work with them to reduce overdraft usage

=== Legal status and controversy ===
In 2006, the Office of Fair Trading issued a statement which concluded that credit card issuers were levying penalty charges when customers exceeded their maximum spend limit and / or made late payments to their accounts. In the statement, the OFT recommended that credit card issuers set such fees at a maximum of £12.

In the statement, the OFT opined that the fees charged by credit card issuers were analogous to unauthorized overdraft fees charged by banks. Many customers who incurred unauthorized overdraft fees used this statement as a springboard to sue their banks in order to recover the fees.

The Supreme Court in 2009 held that the OFT statement was not binding for current (checking) accounts and largely resolved the matter in favor of the banks.

== United States ==
=== Consumer reporting and account denial ===
In the United States some consumer reporting agencies such as ChexSystems, Early Warning Services, and TeleCheck track how people manage their checking accounts. Banks use the agencies to screen checking account applicants. Those with low debit scores are denied checking accounts because a bank can not afford an account to be overdrawn.

=== Overdraft protection ===
Overdraft protection is a credit service offered by banking institutions primarily in the United States. Overdraft or courtesy pay program protection pays items presented to a customer's account when sufficient funds are not present to cover the amount of the withdrawal. Overdraft protection can cover ATM withdrawals, purchases made with a debit card, electronic transfers, and checks. In the case of non-preauthorized items such as cheques, or ACH withdrawals, overdraft protection allows for these items to be paid as opposed to being returned unpaid, or bouncing. However, ATM withdrawals and purchases made with a debit or check card are considered preauthorized and must be paid by the bank when presented, even if this causes an overdraft.

==== Ad hoc coverage ====
Traditionally, the manager of a bank would look at the bank's list of overdrafts each day. If the manager saw that a favored customer had incurred an overdraft, they had the discretion to pay the overdraft for the customer. Banks traditionally did not charge for this ad hoc coverage. However, it was fully discretionary, and so could not be depended on. With the advent of large-scale interstate branch banking, traditional ad hoc coverage has practically disappeared.

The one exception to this is so-called "force pay" lists. At the beginning of each business day, branch managers often still get a computerized list of items that are pending rejection, only for accounts held in their specific branch, city or state. Generally, if a customer is able to come into the branch with cash or make a transfer to cover the amount of the item pending rejection, the manager can "force pay" the item. In addition, if there are extenuating circumstances or the item in question is from an account held by a regular customer, the manager may take a risk by paying the item, but this is increasingly uncommon. Banks have a cut-off time when this action must take place by, as after that time, the item automatically switches from "pending rejection" to "rejected", and no further action may be taken.

==== Overdraft lines of credit ====
This form of overdraft protection is a contractual relationship in which the bank promises to pay overdrafts up to a certain dollar limit. A consumer who wants an overdraft line of credit must complete and sign an application, after which the bank checks the consumer's credit and approves or denies the application. These lines of credit are loans and must comply with the Truth in Lending Act. As with linked accounts, banks typically charge a nominal fee per overdraft, and also charge interest on the outstanding balance. Some banks charge a small monthly fee regardless of whether the line of credit is used. This form of overdraft protection is available to consumers who meet the creditworthiness criteria established by the bank for such accounts. Once the line of credit is established, the available credit may be visible as part of the customer's available balance.

==== Linked accounts ====
Also referred to as "Overdraft Transfer Protection", a checking account can be linked to another account, such as a savings account, credit card, or line of credit. Once the link is established, when an item is presented to the checking account that would result in an overdraft, funds are transferred from the linked account to cover the overdraft. A nominal fee is usually charged for each overdraft transfer, and if the linked account is a credit card or other line of credit, the consumer may be required to pay interest under the terms of that account.

The main difference between linked accounts and an overdraft line of credit is that an overdraft line of credit is typically only usable for overdraft protection. Separate accounts that are linked for overdraft protection are independent accounts in their own right.

==== Bounce protection plans ====
A more recent product being offered by some banks is called "bounce protection".

Smaller banks offer plans administered by third-party companies which help the banks gain additional fee income. Larger banks tend not to offer bounce protection plans, but instead process overdrafts as disclosed in their account terms and conditions.

In either case, the bank may choose to cover overdrawn items at their discretion and charge an overdraft fee, the amount of which may or may not be disclosed. As opposed to traditional ad hoc coverage, this decision to pay or not pay overdrawn items is automated and based on objective criteria such as the customer's average balance, the overdraft history of the account, the number of accounts the customer holds with the bank, and the length of time those accounts have been open. However, the bank does not promise to pay the overdraft even if the automated criteria are met.

Bounce protection plans have some superficial similarities to overdraft lines of credit and ad hoc coverage of overdrafts, but tend to operate under different rules. Like an overdraft line of credit, the balance of the bounce protection plan may be viewable as part of the customer's available balance, yet the bank reserves the right to refuse payment of an overdrawn item, as with traditional ad hoc coverage. Banks typically charge a one-time fee for each overdraft paid. A bank may also charge a recurring daily fee for each day during which the account has a negative balance.

Critics argue that because funds are advanced to a consumer and repayment is expected, bounce protection is a type of loan. Because banks are not contractually obligated to cover the overdrafts, "bounce protection" is not regulated by the Truth in Lending Act, which prohibits certain deceptive advertisements and requires disclosure of the terms of loans. Historically, bounce protection could be added to a consumer's account without their permission or knowledge.

=== Transaction processing order ===
An area of controversy with regards to overdraft fees is the order in which a bank posts transactions to a customer's account. Processing debits from largest to smallest will maximize the number (but not necessarily value—see subset sum problem) of overdrawn debits on a customer's account. This situation can arise when the account holder makes a number of small debits for which there are sufficient funds in the account at the time of purchase. Later, the account holder makes a large debit that overdraws the account (either accidentally or intentionally). If all of the items present for payment to the account on the same day, and the bank processes the largest transaction first, multiple overdrafts can result.

The "biggest check first" policy is common among large U.S. banks. Banks argue that this is done to prevent a customer's most important transactions (such as a rent or mortgage check, or utility payment) from being returned unpaid, despite some such transactions being guaranteed. Consumers have attempted to litigate to prevent this practice, arguing that banks use "biggest check first" to manipulate the order of transactions to artificially trigger more overdraft fees to collect. Banks in the United States are mostly regulated by the Office of the Comptroller of the Currency, a Federal agency, which has formally approved of the practice; the practice has recently been challenged, however, under numerous individual state deceptive practice laws. In class action, U.S. Bank Corporation entered into a $55 million settlement agreement on January 16, 2014, over the practice of reordering transactions (highest-lowest) in posting debit card transactions to customer accounts and the alleged effect the posting order had on the number of overdraft fees charged to account holders.

Bank deposit agreements usually provide that the bank may clear transactions in any order, at the bank's discretion.

=== Opt-in regulation ===
In July 2010, the Federal Reserve adopted regulations (revisions to Regulation E) which prohibited overdraft fees resulting from one time debit card and ATM transactions unless the bank customer had opted into overdraft protection. Consumers who opt into overdraft programs pay more than seven times as much in overdraft and NSF fees, averaging almost $260 a year, based on a recent report from the U.S. Consumer Financial Protection Bureau. Research by Moebs Services released in February 2011 showed that as many as 90% of customers had chosen overdraft protection, resulting in the projection that United States banks would post record profits from overdraft fees.

=== Alternatives to overdraft protection ===
Fintech innovations and overdraft protection apps have led to viable alternatives to overdraft fees.
