= Scanners (disambiguation) =

Scanners may refer to:

- Scanners, an 1981 Canadian science fiction horror film
- Scanners (album), a 2008 album by Kontour
- Scanners (band), an alternative rock band from London
- Scanners (Code Lyoko), devices from the animated series Code Lyoko
- Scanners (collection), the Autumn/Winter 2003 fashion collection by Alexander McQueen
- "Scanners" (Superstore), the 19th episode of season 4 of Superstore
- "Scanners Live in Vain", a 1950 science fiction short story by American writer Cordwainer Smith

== See also ==
- Skannerz, an electronic toy line
