= Float (money supply) =

Part of money supply

In economics, float is duplicate money present in the banking system during the time between a deposit being made in the recipient's account and the money being deducted from the sender's account. It can be used as investable asset, but makes up the smallest part of the money supply. Float affects the amount of currency available to trade and countries can manipulate the worth of their currency by restricting or expanding the amount of float available to trade.

== Definition ==
"Float is money in the banking system that is counted twice, for a brief time, because of delays in processing checks or any transfer of cash", as defined by the Federal Reserve Banks of United States. It is most obvious in the time delay between a cheque being written and the funds to cover that cheque being deducted from the payer's account. Once the payee or recipient of a cheque deposits it in a bank account, the bank provisionally credits the account and thus increases the payee's account in demand deposit, assuming that the payer's bank will ultimately send the funds to cover the cheque. Until the payer's bank actually sends the funds, both payer and payee have the "same" money in both of their accounts. Once the payee's bank notifies the payer's bank by presenting the cheques, the "duplicate" funds will be removed from the payer's account, and the cheques will be considered to have "cleared" the bank.

In cheque clearing, banks refer to 'bank float' and 'customer float'. 'Bank float' is the time it takes to clear the item from the time it was deposited to the time the funds were credited to the depositing bank. 'Customer float' is defined as the span from the time of the deposit to the time the funds are released for use by the depositor. The difference between the bank float and the customer float is called 'negative float'.

== Causes ==
Anything that delays clearing a funds transfer can cause a float. Float is subject to random fluctuations yet creates large revenue stream for banks or like agents. ^{(how?)} Technical issues, legal issues or even inclement weather can cause float to increase. In December and January, increased volumes relative to holiday season increases the so-called 'holdover float'. A backlog of checks or other electronic transfer of cash from the weekend causes float to be high on Tuesdays, thereby causing a weekly trend. Causes of float include deliberate action, inefficiency, logistical situation, and compensation related mechanisms.

== Effect ==
Float inflates the money supply. Countries can manipulate the worth of their currency by restricting or expanding the amount of float available to trade, and transfer agents of any kind effect a profit from holding this currency whether from a 12 hour or 5 day period. The float time of funds can be used to defraud, by misusing it as a form of unauthorized credit, commonly known as cheque kiting.

== Use ==
In the 1970s and 1980s high inflation and high interest rates encouraged large companies to draw funds from remote banks to benefit from "transportation float" which was called "remote disbursement". In 1973, the daily float average was $2.7 billion, and between 1975 and 1979, float more than tripled to a daily average of $6.6 billion.

Float is used by commercial banks as the overnight investable funds. In order to smooth fluctuations in the aggregate level of bank reserves, Federal Reserve banks use their open market operation to buy and sell Government securities daily. Countries can restrict or expand the amount of float available to trade a currency.

== Countermeasures ==
As part of the Monetary Control Act of 1980 the Federal Reserve System charged banks for float, which improved check processing efficiency. To reduce 'transportation float', banks have been able to scan their checks since the 1990s, and present them electronically at the Federal Reserve. With increasing electronic funds transfer, float averaged only $774 million per day in 2000, down from a daily average of $2.7 billion in 1973. Electronic cheques and particularly the Check Clearing for the 21st Century Act in the United States, or Check 21 as it is more commonly called, have been designed to target cheque kiting.

== See also ==
- Federal Reserve Banking
