= Gone in 60 Seconds (bank fraud) =

2012 American fraud scheme

- Date: 2012
- Venue: Various casinos
- Location: Southern California and Nevada, United States
- Type: Fraud scheme
- Cause: Exploitation of a banking glitch
- Participants: Ara Keshishyan and accomplices
- Outcome: Over $1 million stolen; arrests and convictions
- Property damage: Over $1 million stolen
- Arrests: 14
- Convictions: Ara Keshishyan guilty plea, sentences to 57 months imprisonment, other 13 faced up to five years in prison and $250,000

Gone in 60 Seconds was a fraud scheme uncovered in 2012 involving the theft of over $1 million from Citibank using cash advance kiosks at casinos located in Southern California and Nevada.

== Working scheme ==
Ara Keshishyan and accomplices opened CitiBank checking accounts, funding them with an initial balance. The group then traveled to various casinos and all made large withdrawals from bank kiosks simultaneously, exploiting a glitch that allowed them access to multiple times the funds of their initial balance.

After garnering a sizable sum of money, allegedly illegally, from cash-advance kiosks, the suspects went on gambling sprees at casinos. Some casinos gave them free rooms after mistaking them for people who spent a lot of money legitimately. The gang reportedly also kept each individual withdrawal below $10,000, which is the threshold at which casinos must report the transaction to federal authorities.

When Citibank noticed the discrepancies, it alerted the authorities, leading to an FBI-led investigation that resulted in the arrest of the suspects in a series of raids in southern California.

== Charging by FBI ==
Beginning in 2018, fifteen individuals were charged following an FBI-led investigation into the theft of over $1 million from Citibank using cash advance kiosks at casinos located in Southern California and Nevada. FBI agents assisted by the Glendale Police Department and the Los Angeles Police Department arrested 14 of the defendants in the Los Angeles area.

Ara Keshishyan, the alleged ringleader of the operation, was accused of 14 cases of bank fraud, with each charge potentially punishable with up to 30 years imprisonment and a $1 million fine. He entered a guilty plea to the charges in federal court on June 10, 2014, and on September 12 of that year was sentenced to 57 months' imprisonment. The other 13 group members faced up to five years in prison and $250,000 in fines on charges of conspiracy to commit bank fraud and conspiracy to illegally structure financial transactions to avoid reporting requirements. Twelve of his co-conspirators also pleaded guilty and received sentences ranging from probation to twelve months and one day's imprisonment, along with varying amounts of restitution due. One suspect remained a fugitive as of 2014.
