= Authorization hold =

Service of credit and debit card providers

Authorization hold (also card authorization, preauthorization, or preauth) is a service offered by credit and debit card providers whereby the provider puts a hold of the amount approved by the cardholder, reducing the balance of available funds until the merchant clears the transaction (also called settlement), after the transaction is completed or aborted, or because the hold expires.

In the case of debit cards, authorization holds can fall off the account, thus rendering the balance available again, anywhere from one to eight business days after the transaction date, depending on the bank's policy. In the case of credit cards, holds may last as long as thirty days, depending on the issuing bank. Transactions may be withdrawn but in most cases, especially with smaller banks, will not show up as a deposit on the cardholder's bank statement but will instead be directly added to the available balance automatically due to it only being a “temporary charge”.

The usual reason for authorization holds is where there is a two-step process in the payment, consisting of an authorization and a settlement with a time lag in between. These were common with signature-based (non-PIN-based) credit and debit card transactions where a transaction was authorised but not settled until a few days later. It is also common in hotel, rental car services or on pay at the pump at filling stations where the company wants to confirm a valid method of payment has been received prior to providing services or goods and knowing the amount that will be charged.

The major consequence for the user is that they cannot access that part of their account until the authorization hold expires without being finalized or is settled and the banking system transfers the funds. If the account balance is low this could result in an unavailable funds fee. The actual balance will not be reduced until the merchant submits the batch of transactions, and the banking system transfers the funds.

== Process ==
When a merchant swipes a customer's credit card, the credit card terminal connects to the merchant's acquirer, or credit card processor, which verifies that the customer's account is valid and that sufficient funds are available to cover the transaction's cost. At this step, the funds are "held" and deducted from the customer's credit limit (or available bank balance, in the case of a debit card), but are not yet transferred to the merchant. At the time of the merchant's choosing, the merchant instructs the credit card machine to submit the finalized transactions to the acquirer in a "batch transfer," which begins the settlement process, where the funds are transferred from the customers' accounts to the merchant's accounts.

This process is not instantaneous: the transaction may not appear on the customer's statement or online account activity for one to two days, and it can take up to three days for funds to be deposited in the merchant's account. The preauthorization will be terminated if it is allowed to expire before the settlement occurs.

For example, if an individual has a credit limit of $100 and uses a credit card to make a purchase at a retail store for $30, then the available credit will immediately decrease to $70, because the merchant has obtained an authorization from the individual's bank by swiping the card through its credit card terminal.

If the billing statement were then sent out immediately, the actual charges would still be $0, because the merchant has not actually collected the funds in question. The actual charge is not put through until the merchant submits their batch of transactions and the banking system transfers the funds.

A debit card works differently. Like in the previous example, if one has a balance of $100 in the bank and used a debit card to make a purchase at a retail store for $30, the available balance will immediately decrease to $70, as a hold on the $30 is enacted because the merchant has obtained an authorization from the bank by swiping the card through the credit card terminal. However, the actual balance with the bank is still $100, because the merchant has not actually collected the funds in question.

== Delays ==
Some services, like hotels and rental cars, have the card as authorized at the beginning of service, but the settlement will not be placed until the completion of the service. Many times, there are additional deposits required in addition to the anticipated cost of the service to cover any additional unexpected charges for damages, excessive mileage or fuel, or if hotel guests charge room service, movies, or phone calls to the account.

Upon the completion of the service, the vendor will then process the settlement of any final charges and submit them to the processor. It is not until then that the vendor will receive any funds, even though the customer's account would have shown the pending transaction from the authorization at the beginning of service. The settled charges will be deducted from the authorized funds and are not in addition to the authorized funds. Both car rental and hotel incidental holds can be kept by the merchant for up to 30 days from the date of original charge. In most cases, the merchant determines the amount of the hold, and the card issuing company determines the length of time it takes before the hold is released.

== Double holds ==
On occasion, negligence or computer error may make a merchant attempt to authorize a card twice, creating a double hold on the cardholder's bank account. That often happens when a processor requires additional security verification such as a card security code, ZIP code, or address, and incorrect information is provided or is mistyped. Gasoline pumps often impose a double hold, one for a standard amount (such as $75) and another for the amount of purchase. Though the merchant will settle the transaction only once, the hold will temporarily lower the customer's available balance, potentially causing declines or, for a debit card, even overdrafts.

Concurrent holds have also been reported in online airline bookings. In April 2022 customers of the Australian carrier Qantas said that single bookings had produced several holds at once: one reported 14 pending transactions totalling A$42,000 against a booking that should have cost about A$3,500, and another reported being billed A$2,025 twice and then a further A$4,050. Qantas said the customers had not in fact been charged more than once, attributing the amounts to "a delay in releasing pre-authorised funds" that it said were released automatically within three to seven days, and advised customers who needed the money sooner to ask their banks to release it. Further accounts of the same problem were reported in October 2023, among them a customer who said two holds of A$5,500 had been placed against a single booking and that the funds did not become available again for a week; the airline gave substantially the same explanation.

== Holds for differing amounts ==
Another issue that occurs on a regular basis with authorization holds is the transaction amount changing between the time the hold is placed on the account and when the transaction is settled. It most commonly occurs when the final debit amount is uncertain when the authorization is actually obtained.

For example, if an individual makes a fuel purchase by swiping a check card or credit card at the pump without using the PIN, the pump has no way of knowing how much fuel will be used. The pump typically authorizes a fixed amount, usually $1 but sometimes up to $100, to verify that the card is legitimate and that the customer has funds available. When the transaction is settled, it will actually post for the value of the purchase.

Another example can be seen with a restaurant transaction. If an individual spends $40 at a meal, the server does not know how large a tip they will leave if they choose to leave one on the card. The restaurant's credit card terminal is typically set to authorize a larger amount, such as 20% above the cost of the meal, but the transaction will settle for the actual total including the actual tip written on the receipt. Some restaurants will authorize just the amount of the bill, but the transaction will settle higher with the tip included. This type of settlement (for an amount higher than the authorized amount) is only possible when the original authorization was executed with a specific merchant category code (hospitality). It is not possible in eCommerce or retail environments.

Acquiring banks sometimes forbid the practice of preauthorizing an amount including a tip, but will guarantee settlement of the amount authorized, plus 15 or 20%.

Other businesses that may settle transactions for different amounts than those originally authorized include hotels and car rental agencies. The final cost of these transactions can be extremely unpredictable from unforeseen extras such as room service charges, refuelling charges, or longer stays. Those companies typically place a hold on the customer's credit card at the beginning of the transaction for the estimated total, plus a percentage or a fixed cash amount (such as the estimated rental charges, plus 15% or $250). The establishments usually do not settle the transactions until after the customer has checked out or returned the rental car. Some hotels and car rental agencies do not accept Visa or MasterCard-branded debit cards, as the authorization holds can expire before the transaction is settled. Additionally, some agencies use the requirement of a credit card as a tool to screen high-risk customers, as credit cards usually require a good credit history, and all that is needed for a debit card is a checking account.

Another example of a transaction that may settle for an amount different from the amount authorized is a transaction incurred in a currency different from the currency in which the card is denominated. The final, settled, transaction amount will be based on the exchange rate in effect on the settlement date. Since that rate is generally not known at the time of authorization, the banks will use an estimated amount based on the exchange rate at the time of authorization.
