= Dishonoured cheque =

Cheque that a bank declines to pay

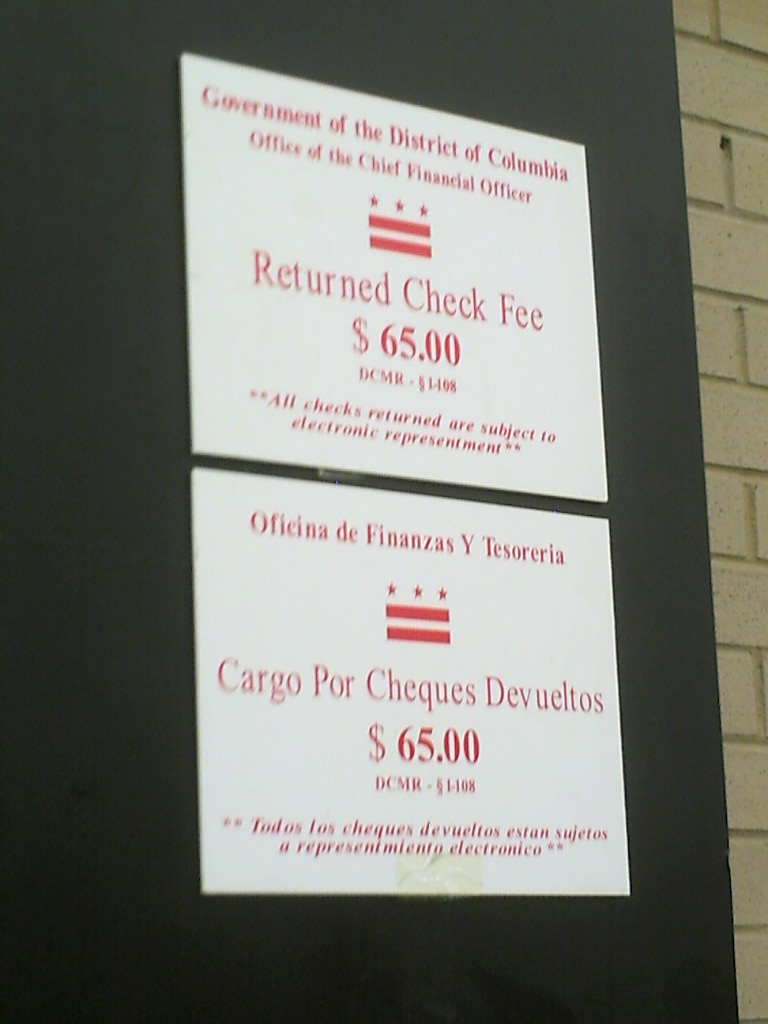
Sign at DC Public library indicating that a returned cheque will be subject to a fee of US$65.

A dishonoured cheque (American English: dishonored check) is a cheque that the bank on which it is drawn declines to pay ("honour"). There are a number of reasons why a bank might refuse to honour a cheque, with non-sufficient funds (NSF) being the most common, indicating that there are insufficient cleared funds in the account on which the cheque was drawn. An NSF cheque may be referred to as a bad cheque, dishonoured cheque, bounced cheque, cold cheque, rubber cheque, returned item, or hot cheque. Lost or bounced cheques result in late payments and affect the relationship with customers. In England and Wales and Australia, such cheques are typically returned endorsed "Refer to drawer", an instruction to contact the person issuing the cheque for an explanation as to why it was not paid. If there are funds in an account, but insufficient cleared funds, the cheque is normally endorsed "Present again", by which time the funds should have cleared.

When more than one cheque is presented for payment on the same day, and the payment of both would result in the account becoming overdrawn (or below some approved credit limit), the bank has a discretion as to which cheque to pay and which to dishonour. A bank has a general discretion whether or not to honour a cheque that will result in an account becoming overdrawn, but a payment on one occasion does not bind the bank to do so again on another occasion. A bank cannot partially pay on a cheque, so that it must either pay a cheque in full or dishonour it. If a bank declines to pay a cheque, it must promptly return the cheque to the person who deposited it or presented it to be cashed. In general, a bank can only pay out of the account on which it was drawn, and cannot draw on any other account that the customer may have at the bank, unless expressly instructed to the contrary.

== Reasons for dishonour ==
Cheques may be dishonoured by a financial institution because:

- There are insufficient cleared funds in the account to cover the value of the cheque.
- The account holder has instructed the bank not to pay the cheque (called a stopped cheque).
- The account holder's funds have been frozen.
- The account does not actually exist, either due to a false cheque being presented, an error in writing the account number, or the account being closed.
- The cheque has expired, is cashed before the date on the cheque, or the date on the cheque is erroneous.
- There is a discrepancy in the amounts written in numbers and the amount in words.
- The cheque is scribbled or overwritten.
- The signature on the cheque does not match the signature on file of the account holder or an authorised signatory on the account, or has touched the MICR strip on the cheque.
- The cheque is damaged.

== Process ==
If a bank receives a cheque that it would normally dishonour, such as there being insufficient funds in an account on which it is drawn, the manager may as a courtesy contact the customer to advise them of the situation to allow them to rectify the situation promptly to avoid a cheque being dishonoured. The bank is not obliged to contact the customer, and is unlikely to do so more than once.

When a cheque is dishonoured, the bank customer may be charged a dishonour fee by their bank. If paying the cheque would result in the account becoming overdrawn, the bank may in its discretion still honour the cheque. In this situation, the bank may charge an overdraft establishment fee, in addition to interest at the overdraft rate until the account is back in credit.

If a cheque is dishonoured for any reason, the bank on which it is drawn must promptly return the cheque to the depositor's (payee's) bank, which will ultimately return it to the depositor. The depositor's bank will debit the amount of the cheque from the depositor's account into which it had been deposited, as well as a service fee.

Depending on the reason for a cheque being dishonoured, the depositor may determine whether to re-submit the cheque, hoping it will be paid on a second attempt, or else proceed immediately with collection activities, civil or criminal.

== Consequences of insufficient funds ==
Among the consequences of issuing a NSF cheque are actions by financial institutions, civil liability to the drawee, and possible criminal penalties. When a bad cheque is negotiated, the recipient of the cheque may choose to take action against the drawer. The action that is taken may be a civil collection action or lawsuit, or seeking criminal charges, depending on the amount of the cheque and the laws in the jurisdiction where the cheque is drawn.

=== Civil consequences ===
If the dishonoured cheque has been scanned and replaced by a substitute cheque, the original cheque is not returned to the depositor, but instead the substitute cheque will be marked "not sufficient funds" and returned to the depositor. The recipient may choose not to accept cheques in the future from the writer (typically recorded on a paper or electronic "Do not accept cheques from..." list), or may suspend the cheque-writer's privileges until the cheque-writer has made good on the debt.

The recipient may also choose to report the writer to a database service. This may lead to other merchants in the future refusing to accept cheques from the writer or a joint account holder, or the writer having trouble obtaining a chequing account at another bank. If a merchant or other place of business receives too many bad cheques from customers, it may simply decide to not accept any cheques at all from anyone.

=== Criminal consequences ===
In some cases the issuance of a NSF cheque may result in criminal prosecution of the drawer of the cheque. Criminal charges are more likely where the drawer can be shown to have issued the cheque knowing that it would not be honoured. Charges are also more likely when the NSF cheque is for a large amount, or where the drawer issues multiple NSF checks.

== Prevention ==
Steps that can be taken to reduce the likelihood of a bad cheque include:

- Carrying a higher balance in the chequing account; that is to always have a "buffer" amount just in case an unexpected cheque does clear
- Better balancing techniques
- Overdraft protection – This may be in the form of a link to a savings account from which funds will be automatically transferred, a credit card, or a line of credit designed specially for this purpose
- Using a credit card, debit card, or cash instead of cheques

== Legal issues ==
=== Australia ===
The Cheques Act 1986 (Cth) imposes strict liability on the drawer of a dishonoured cheque. The payee may sue the drawer on the cheque itself, who may not have been the original debtor.

=== India ===
In India, a bounced cheque is a criminal offence, punishable by fines upto twice the cheque amount, jail term of 2 years, or both under Section 138 of the Negotiable Instruments Act, 1881.

=== Israel ===
In Israel, a bounced cheque without cover incurs a negative record in the credit history of account holder(s). Ten bounced cheques during a year would result in the restriction of cheques for the account, and the bank will bounce new cheques for a year. If the account owner continues to draw cheques during the restriction period, that person's accounts in all Israeli banks will be denied from issuing cheques.

A dishonoured cheque can be presented to the state bailiff service for being forcedly paid.

=== United Arab Emirates ===
Until January 2013, a bounced cheque was a criminal offence in the United Arab Emirates that led to imprisonment of the person who wrote it.

=== United States ===
In many jurisdictions in the United States, a bad check restitution program exists that allows recipients of bad cheques to collect the funds from the local district attorney's office, regardless of the amount. An agency run by the district attorney will pursue the drawer of the cheque by attempting to collect the funds in exchange for avoiding criminal prosecution. The cheque drawer will be responsible to cover the amount of the cheque, plus all fees to which the recipient is legally entitled, plus a programme fee. The drawer will also be required to take a course designed to improve cheque-writing habits. These programmes are controversial and in recent years have come under fire in lawsuits. Normally, if the cheque writer can cover up their bad credits in sixty days, all charges will be dropped.

In some jurisdictions, for a criminal prosecution on a bad cheque there must be some element of fraud involved in the issuance of the cheque. In some U.S. states, if the cheque drawer informs the party they are uttering the cheque to that it will not clear at the current time (such as asking someone to "hold" a cheque for a few days), if the cheque bounces, they can still be sued for the value of the cheque, but warning the recipient before acceptance that the cheque will not clear immediately negates the element of fraud and prevents criminal prosecution. For similar reasons, a post-dated cheque will not normally support a conviction for issuing a NSF cheque.

=== United Kingdom ===
In England and Wales, the use of the endorsement "refer to drawer" has become standard after a bank was successfully sued for libel after returning a cheque incorrectly endorsed "insufficient funds"; the court ruled that, as there were sufficient funds, the statement was demonstrably false and damaging to the reputation of the person issuing the cheque. Even with the use of this revised endorsement, the mere implication that funds were insufficient has been held to be libelous in other cases of banks mistakenly refusing to pay cheques.

== See also ==
- Bad check restitution program
- Check fraud
- ChexSystems
