= Don C. Sowers =

American economist, sociologist and physicist (1883 to 1942)

- portrait of Sowers, circa 1916
- Born: February 17, 1883; Spring Hill, Kansas, United States
- Died: July 19, 1942 (aged 59)
- Occupations: professor, researcher, public servant, government consultant, writer, editor
- Spouse: Helen Smith (m. 1914)
- Parent(s): James W. and Electa Sowers

Academic background
- Education: Baker University (BA); Columbia University (PhD)

Academic work
- Era: 20th century
- Discipline: economics, sociology, public law (main work) physics (earliest work)
- Sub-discipline: government management (main work)
- Institutions: University of Colorado (1922–1942); Akron Bureau of Municipal Research (1917–22); University of Oregon (1913–16); Department of Terrestrial Magnetism at the Carnegie Institution (1904–10)
- Main interests: management of municipalities, states, public schools, and public universities (main work) terrestrial magnetism (earliest work)

4th President of the American Municipal Association
- In office 1929
- Preceded by: A. D. McLarty
- Succeeded by: Harvey W. Draper

Secretary of the Colorado Municipal League
- In office 1923–1942
- Preceded by: inaugural holder

Secretary of the Ohio Board of Administration
- In office 1921

Director of the Akron, Ohio Bureau of Municipal Research
- In office 1917–1922

Donald Conger Sowers Sr. (February 17, 1883 – July 19, 1942) was an American economist, sociologist, physicist, consultant, and academic. He originally worked as a physicist specializing in terrestrial magnetism after receiving his bachelor degree in physics from Baker University in 1904, but in the 1910s changed direction and completed a Ph.D. in economics from Columbia University, sociology, and public law. From the 1910s onward, his work specialized on the management of municipalities, states, public schools, and universities.

As a physicist specializing in terrestrial magnetism, Sowers worked for the Department of Terrestrial Magnetism at the Carnegie Institution from 1904 to 1906. His work saw him travel across various parts of the world. Explorer Roald Amundsen had Sowers adjust magnetic instruments that were later used on Amundsen's history-making South Pole expedition. In recognition of a 1910 scientific expedition Sowers took to parts of China rarely-before visited by other white people, Sowers was made a member Royal Geographical Society, a rarity for an American.

After transitioning to economics, sociology, and public law, Sowers worked at the University of Oregon from 1913 to 1916. At the university, he taught as a professor on municipal matters and public accounting, served as head of the university's School of Commerce, and served as director of the university's Municipal Research Bureau. He also worked during this time as a consultant to numerous municipal governments, influentially advising governments to transition to council-manager government. In 1916, he left the university to accept a position in the Akron, Ohio city government's Bureau of Municipal Research. In 1917, he was made the bureau's director, a position he held until 1922. He also served as secretary of the Ohio Board of Administration, and directed a government reform study commissioned by a state legislative committee.

In 1922, Sowers left Akron to take a position on the faculty of the University of Colorado (Boulder). From 1922 until his death in 1942, he was the director of the university's Bureau of Business and Government. In the 1920s, Sowers worked as a consultant to Colorado Governor William Ellery Sweet on matters related to state government reorganization and state government budgets. From the organization's founding until his death in 1942, Sowers was the secretary of the Colorado Municipal League. In 1929, he served as president of the American Municipal Association (today known as the "National League of Cities"). He also served as secretary of the Colorado State School Board Association.

== Early life ==
Sowers was born on February 17, 1883 in Spring Hill, Kansas. He was the son of James W. and Electa Sowers. He was the nephew of Eliza Telford, who was an instructor at Baker University.

In 1904, Sowers graduated from Baker University with a Bachelor of Arts in physics. While attending the university, he was a member of its chapter of Kappa Sigma.

== Early work as a physicist ==
The same year that Sowers graduated from Baker University, he became an observer for the newly-founded Department of Terrestrial Magnetism at the Carnegie Institution. He worked as an observer there until 1910. His work saw him travel to the West Indies, South America, the Pacific Ocean, India, New Zealand.

Sowers conducted magnetic surveys of islands in the West Indies. After this, he traveled for eighteen months aboard the Carnegie Institution's ship, the Galilee, to conduct a magnetic survey of the Pacific Ocean. This work also brought him to the Samoan Islands and other islands in the Pacific.

After explorer Roald Amundsen completed his journey of the Northwest Passage, he had Sowers travel to meet him in Alaska and standardize (adjust) his magnetic instruments (i.e. compasses). The instruments that Sowers adjusted were used by Amundsen on later journeys, including his historic South Pole expedition.

In 1910, he was a member of a data-collecting expedition through China and Turkmenistan. The trip saw him travel from Peking (Beijing) to Kashgar, followed by travel across five passes of the Himalayas to enter India. After India, he returned to the United States. The trip also included areas of Afghanistan. The expedition featured only one other white companion and several Chinese companions, and brought him through areas in the heart of China that few other white men had traveled before. His work on this 1910 expedition resulted in his election to the Royal Geographical Society of England, a rarity for an American.

== Transition to economics and sociology ==
In the 1910s, Sowers refocused his work on economics, sociology, and public policy. He attended Columbia University, located in New York City. He received a Ph.D. from Columbia in economics, sociology, and public law. For the remainder of his life, his work primarily focused on the management of municipalities, states, public schools, and universities. In his work on municipal affairs, Sowers incorporated observations he had made of cities he had traveled to while abroad as a physicist. After graduating from Columbia, Sowers took a public service training program offered by the New York Bureau of Municipal Research.

While attending school in New York City, he worked on a review of the New York City Police Department's detective bureau; worked a study of the segregated budget of the New York City Department of Public Work for Manhattan; worked on writing municipal budget of Hoboken, New Jersey; worked on a feasibility study of grade separation to eliminate grade crossings along the New York Central Railroad system; and published reports of in-depth research on the fee system for New York City public officials.

== Work in Oregon (1914–16) ==
In September 1913, Sowers began working at the University of Oregon. In 1914, Sowers became a professor became a professor at the university, teaching the subjects of municipalities and public accounting. While teaching at the university, he worked on studies of municipal matters, and edited a series of bulletins titled "Short Talks for Busy Officials". The bulletins covered subjects on professional correspondence (communication) between government officials. The bulletins addressed matters impacting municipalities in Oregon. He also was director of the university's Municipal Research Bureau. He also served as the head of the university's School of Commerce.

In these years, Sowers also worked as a municipal management consultant. He conducted municipal management studies for cities in the states of Oregon and New York. This included studies for the Oregon cities of LaGrande, Lebanon, Medford, Salem, and the New York capital city of Albany. Sowers also was involved in writing the municipal charter of the Orgeon cities of Florence and Oregon City. Sowers was influential in many American cities overhauling their governments in the early 20th century to a council-manager forms of government that vested many government operations under the oversight of a professional city manager. Sowers played a direct hand in advising many cities in restructuring their management systems and installing city managers.

== Work in Ohio (1916–22) ==
In 1916, Sowers moved from Oregon (where he had been working as a university professor) to Ohio in order to take a position as the assistant director of research for the city of Akron, Ohio. The following year, he was promoted to director of the city's Bureau of Municipal Research. In 1919, he was appointed the director of a state legislative committee-commissioned study in Ohio that was tasked with conducting a survey of state governmental agencies and departments in order to identify opportunities to centralize and consolidate functions, and remove duplication. In 1921, he served as the secretary of the Ohio Board of Administration.

== Work in Colorado (1922–1942) ==
In 1922, Sowers joined the faculty of the University of Colorado (Boulder). He soon became director of the university's Bureau of Business and Government Research. He held this position until his 1942 death.

In the 1920s, Sowers worked as a consultant to Colorado Governor William Ellery Sweet on matters related to state government reorganization and state government budgets.

From its founding in 1923 until his death in 1942, Sowers served as secretary of the Colorado Municipal League. He was also at one time its director. In 1929, he served as president of the American Municipal Association (today known as the "National League of Cities").

In 1936, Sowers wrote an article in opposition of a ballot initiative that would limit property tax in Colorado. Sowers characterized the initiative as a cynical ploy by property owners to capitalize off of Great Depression-motivated anti-tax sentiments among the public in order to pass a limitation which in actuality would cause a regressive shift of the state's tax burden away from property taxes to (among other things) sales tax. The measure was ultimately roundly defeated by Colorado voters.

Late in his life, Sowers served as secretary of the Colorado State School Board Association.

== Opinion survey work ==
Sowers conducted and authored many public surveys and studies. This included a long-running survey of Colorado state government revenue collection and spending.

== Writing and editing career ==
Sowers wrote several books, was the editor of Colorado Municipalities Magazine and also wrote many articles. Subjects his works covered including public education spending, state government policy, histories of public finance, and restructuring of governmental organization.

=== Books authored ===
- Financial History of New York State (1789–1912)
- Financing Public Education Colorado vol. 1 (1924)
- Financing Public Education Colorado vol. 2 (published in 1924)
- The Tax Problem in Colorado (1928)
- The Elimination of Small Schools in Colorado (1935) –co-authored with Martin F. Schmidt
- The Effect of Tax Limitation Upon State and Local Governments in Colorado (1936)

== Personal life and death ==
Sowers married Helen Smith in 1914. Together, they had several children. One daughter and two sons of theirs survived to adulthood. This included on Don C. Sowers Jr., son Robert M. Sowers, and daughter Helen Armour.

Sowers died from a heart attack on July 19, 1942. The University of Colorado Boulder's library archives collection maintains a collection of his papers.

Sowers' widow, Helen, died in 1961.
