= ADEC =

ADEC or ADeC may refer to:

- A-dec, an American dental office furniture and equipment manufacturer
- African Democratic Change, a South African political party
- Harvard Mark III, an early computer also known as ADEC (Aiken Dahlgren Electronic Calculator)
