= Maryland Municipal League =

The Maryland Municipal League (MML) is a voluntary, nonprofit, nonpartisan group (501 (c)(4)) that works to support and unite the 157 incorporated municipal governments in the state of Maryland, as well as four special taxing districts through advocacy, public policy and leadership development. MML was founded in 1936 and is located in Annapolis, Maryland. The 15 person staff team is led by Chief Executive Officer, Theresa Kuhns. As an affiliate member of the National League of Cities, the MML also offers legislative representation in Washington, D.C., and connections to other municipal colleagues throughout the United States.

In June 2025, Mayor Todd Nock, Pocomoke City, was elected President of the Board of Directors for a one-year term.

== See also ==
- List of state Municipal Leagues
