= Austin Hall (Oregon State University) =

Building on the Oregon State University campus in Corvallis, Oregon, U.S.

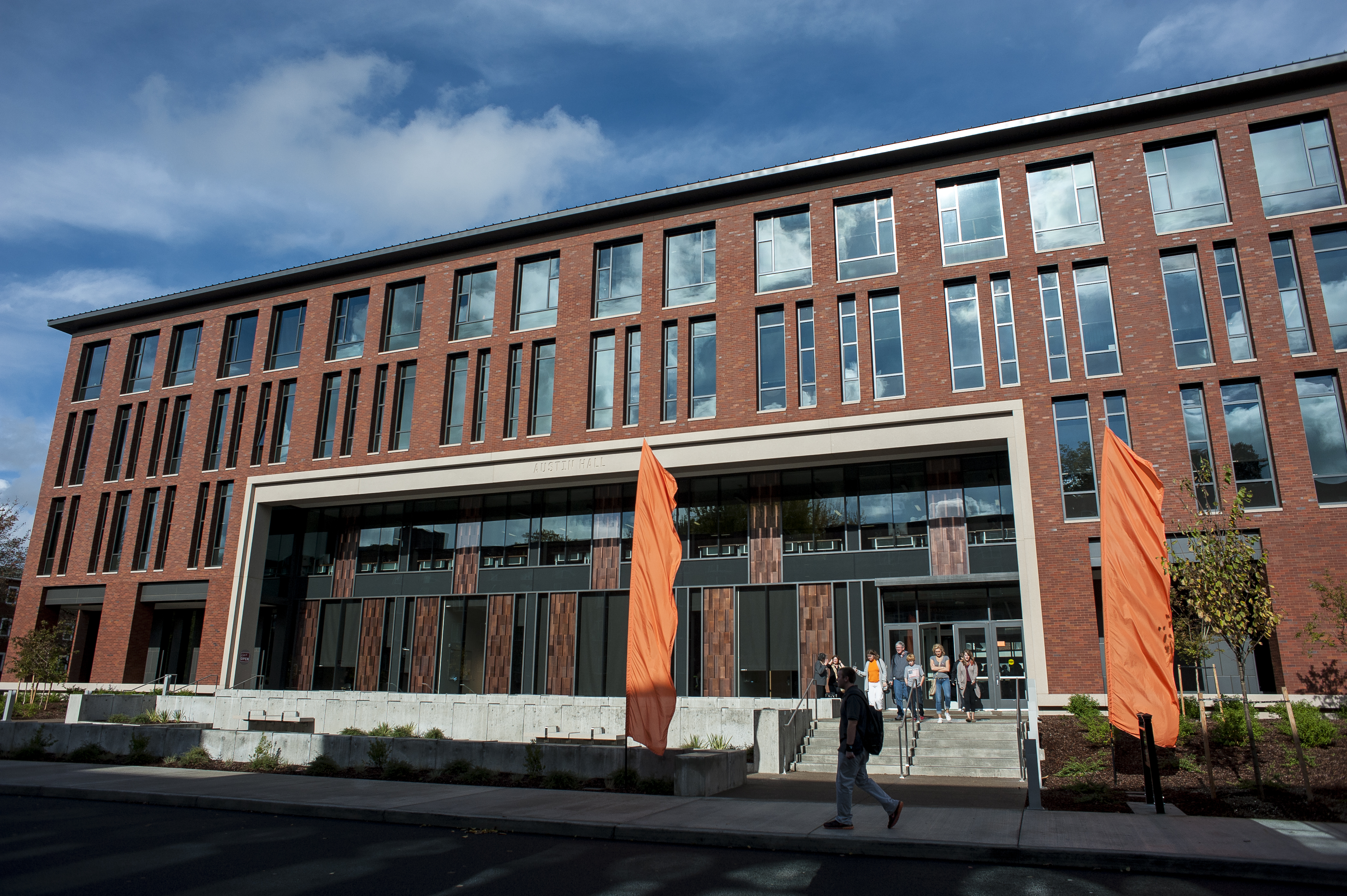
- Austin Hall, home of the Oregon State University College of Business.
- Interactive map of the Austin Hall area

General information
- Location: 2751 Southwest Jefferson Avenue, Corvallis, Oregon, United States
- Coordinates: 44.56492°N 123.28195°W
- Current tenants: Oregon State University College of Business
- Named for: Ken and Joan Austin
- Cost: $55 million
- Owner: Oregon State University

Technical details
- Floor count: 4
- Floor area: 100,000 square feet

Design and construction
- Other designers: THA Architecture
- Main contractor: Andersen Construction

Austin Hall is a building located at 2751 Southwest Jefferson Avenue on the Oregon State University campus in Corvallis, Oregon, United States. The building, home to the Oregon State University College of Business, is named after and primarily funded by Ken and Joan Austin. Mr. Austin, an alumnus of the College Business, founded A-dec, a dental office furniture and equipment manufacturer based in Newberg, Oregon, United States, with his wife Joan in 1964. The building was designed by THA Architecture, and built by Andersen Construction (the later founded by Oregon State alumnus David Anderson).

Opened in September 2014, Austin Hall comprises 100,000 square feet over four floors.

- The first floor has a large lecture hall, study spaces, academic advising and counseling offices, study spaces, student project rooms and Trader Bing's Cafe.
- The second floor features smaller classrooms, more study rooms, and a common area with computers, printers, and study spaces.
- The third floor has more small classrooms, project rooms for graduate students, various study spaces, the College of Business research lab, and faculty offices.
- The fourth floor has conference rooms, as well as more faculty offices, including the office of the Dean.

The US$55 million building was funded with a mix of private philanthropy ($30 million+) and states bonds ($20 million+). Notable donors include Ken and Joan Austin ($10 million) as well as Al and Pat Reser ($6 million). Al Reser is a College of Business alumni and founder of Reser's Fine Foods.
