= National League of Cities =

Advocacy organisation in United States

- Abbreviation: NLC
- Formation: 1924
- Type: non-governmental organization
- Headquarters: 660 North Capitol St., NW Suite 450 Washington, DC
- Location: Washington, D.C.
- Members: 2700+
- Board Chair: Kevin Kramer, Councilmember, Louisville, Kentucky
- CEO & Executive Director: Clarence E. Anthony
- First Vice President: Van Johnson, Mayor Savannah, Georgia
- Second Vice President: Doreen Garlid, Coucnilmember, Tempe, Arizona
- Website: www.nlc.org
- Formerly called: American Municipal Association

The National League of Cities (NLC) is an American advocacy organization with more than 2,700 member cities, towns, and villages, that represents the country's 19,495 cities, towns, and villages along with 49 state municipal leagues. Created in 1924, it has evolved into a membership organization providing education, research, support, and advocacy to city leaders across America. Based in Washington, D.C., it is considered part of the 'Big Seven', a group of organizations that represent state and local governments in the United States. NLC provides training and other resources to municipal officials, holds conferences, and conducts federal advocacy efforts on behalf of cities, towns and villages.

Today, NLC is a convening organization, support network, and representative in federal affairs for local governments. Leading priorities for the group include the economy, civility, infrastructure, public safety, technology, education, families, and global engagement.

== History ==
NLC was first founded as the American Municipal Association in Lawrence, Kansas by a group of ten state municipal leagues seeking greater coordination and representation in national affairs. Over time, the organization's membership expanded to include individual cities of all sizes.

NLC has played a key role in shaping federal urban policy and defining city issues in America. At a 1970 convention that William Ruckelshaus, Administrator of the newly created Environmental Protection Agency, announced an order requiring Cleveland, Detroit, and Atlanta to clean up their inadequately treated sewage discharges into rivers, thereby helping send a message that the young agency meant business.

== Finances ==
The National League of Cities annual budget is approximately $21,000,000. The organization is funded through member dues from cities, towns and villages as well as a mix of private and governmental grants. NLC showed operating surpluses of $8,893,800 in 2022 and $5,421,744 in 2021 and NLC annual operating deficits of -$2,381,192 in 2025, -$4,748,616 in 2024, -$791,488 in 2023, and -$2,650,474 in 2020.

NLC Member dues are based solely on population.

Clarence E. Anthony, CEO & Executive Director, total annual compensation is $1,205,493.

Emil Mara is the Chief Financial Officer.

== Activities ==
=== Federal Advocacy ===
NLC lobbies Congress on multiple issues that directly impact municipalities, including municipal infrastructure, particularly transportation; supporting local energy efficiency and conservation efforts; strengthening and stabilizing the housing market; providing services to support the health and stability of families; and supporting community safety. NLC's core lobbying principles include avoiding unfunded mandates, preserving local authority and protecting the intergovernmental partnership.

Irma Esparza Diggs is the Senior Executive and Director of Fderal Advocacy.

==== Congressional Caucus of Former Local Elected Officials ====
NLC and the National Association of Counties (NACo) formed the Congressional Caucus of Former Local Elected Officials in 2021. The bipartisan caucus brings together members of Congress with prior service in local government to improve intergovernmental partnerships, provide up-to-date information about mutual policy interests to members of Congress and their staffs, and ensure the local government voice is heard in federal decision-making.

==== Second Trump Administration ====
The National League of Cities carefully attempted to develop a partnership with the second Trump Administration by not speaking against the administration. NLC was silent when former NLC Reimaging Public Safety Task Force co-chair and Newark Mayor Ras Baraka was arrested by ICE on May 8, 2026. Baraka was with Congressional Democrats conducting oversight of the GEO Group owned Delaney Hall detention facility in Newark, New Jersey.

Clarence E. Anthony and Vince Micone in Philadelphia, Pennsylvania, in May 2026.

NLC was similarly silent while NLC Board of Directors member and Broadview, Illinois, Mayor Katrina Thompson, managed protests and disruptions during ICE's Operation Midway Blitz.

NLC hired President Trump's former Acting Secretary for the U.S. Department of Labor, Vince Micone, as Clarence E. Anthony's Chief of Staff in May 2026. During his tenure leading the Labor Department, he complied with the administration and led the anti-DEI DOGE efforts and cut grant funding to cities, towns, and villages.

=== International Activities ===
The National League of Cities created the Global Engagaement Advisory Council in 2025 in order to build a robust international engagement strategy for the organization and its members.

NLC Immediate Past President Steve Pattersona and an NLC staffer were in Mexico City, Mexico, for the United Cities and Local Government (UCLG), Executive Bureau from April 8-10, 2026. Local and regional leaders from across the globe gathered to advance a shared political agenda rooted in care, cooperation, and stronger multilateralism from the territories.

Clarence Anthony and Immediate Past President Steve Patterson spoke as part of a panel discussion at the Institute for Global Affairs at the Eurasia Group in New York City on May 5, 2026.

The National League of Cities hosted a webinar with ALLIES (Alliance for Local Leaders International) on May 26, 2026. Webinar speakers included: Ambassador (Ret.) Nina Hachigian, CEO, Alliance for Local Leaders International, Max Bouchet, Center Director, Center for State & Local Diplomacy, Meridian International (Moderator), Katie Rosenberg, Former Mayor of Wausau, Wisconsin, Genesis D. Gavino, Chief of Staff, City of Austin, TX, City Manager’s Office, Benjamin Moore, Chief Global Affairs Officer, San Diego, CA.

NLC sent Immediate Past President Steve Patterson to Nancy, Fance, for the Urban7 International Mayors' Summit from June 3 to 6, 2026. The Nancy Summit’s head of U.S. delegation was Mayor Steve Patterson of Athens, Ohio. Mayor Patterson was representing the U.S. Conference of Mayors, but also has roles as outgoing National League of Cities President and ICLEI USA member.

Mayor Steve Patterson, Mayor Van R. Johnson II, and Clarence E. Anthony in Singapore for the 2026 World Cities Summit.

Mayor Steve Patterson joined the City Diplomacy Lab and the German Marshall Fund of the United States at Reid Hall in Paris, France, to share his experience in Nancy, France. The event acted as the closing event for the U7 International Mayors' Summit.

NLC sent Clarence E. Anthony, NLC Second Vice President Van R. Johnson II, Immediate Past President Steve Patterson, and an NLC staffer to the World Cities Summit in Singapore from June 14 to June 16, 2026.

NLC's Irma Esparza Diggs, Senior Executive and Director of Federal Advocacy, traveled to Mexico City, Mexico, for the American Mexican Leadership Council, from August 24-26, 2026.

=== Conferences ===
The National League of Cities paid to project an image of CEO & Executive Director, Clarence E. Anthony, for an evening onto the side of the Embassy Suites to celebrate the organizations 100th anniversary at City Summit 2024 in Tampa, Florida.

NLC hosts the annual City Summit conference in a different city held annually in November at which municipal officials and youth leaders participate in workshops, general sessions, networking opportunities and leadership training seminars.

City Summit 2026 marks the first time the National League of Cities has introduced a dedicated international component to its flagship annual conference, and the Global Plenary is its centerpiece. The session brings U.S. municipal leaders into dialogue with their international counterparts. Three delegations, from Canada, Japan and Singapore, will each share how their cities and local governments are tackling shared challenges, from housing, trade and economic development to disaster resilience, AI and climate adaptation. A moderated conversation then draws out lessons U.S. cities can put to work at home, and dedicated networking time lets attendees connect directly with the delegations.

NLC's other yearly conference is the Congressional City Conference, held annually in March in Washington, D.C. Thousands of municipal officials discuss NLC’s legislative priorities with Members of Congress and the Administration, share promising practices, discuss policy and participate in leadership training opportunities.

== Programs ==
=== Center for Member and Partner Engagement ===
NLC’s Center for Member and Partner Engagement oversees relationships with more than 2,700 member municipalities of NLC, the 49 state municipal leagues nationwide, and 62 trusted strategic partners. The Center consists of four distinct services: Member Services and Engagement, Strategic Partnerships, State League Services and Risk Information Sharing Consortium (RISC). The 2,700 NLC members represent 14 percent of the nation's 19,000 cities, towns, and villages. NLC membership has remained flat for nearly 10 years.

Seantae Byers is the Senior Executive and Director of Member and Partner Engagement.

==== Member Services and Engagement ====
Member Services and Engagement actively strives to recruit new members while collectively strengthening the representation of cities, towns, and villages throughout the country. They also engage current member municipalities through NLC's six constituency groups, seven member councils, and seven committees.

==== Strategic Partnerships ====
Strategic Partnerships facilitates connections between NLC's strategic partners and local leaders, fostering collaborations to make America’s cities smarter, more responsive, and economically vibrant. They bring private sector perspectives and solutions to issues facing cities, support NLC’s mission to strengthen local communities across the country and promote the exchange of ideas between corporate and local leaders. Private and publicly traded companies pay to partner with NLC and promote their products to NLC members.

Strataegic Partnerships are separated into three categories: Enterprise Partners, Capstone Partners, and Executive Partners. Enterprise Partners are explicitly endorsed by NLC and members are encouraged to engage in business and partnerships with those companies. Clarence E. Anthony, NLC CEO & Executive Director, is the paid board chair of Enterprise Partner, BAM, and a paid board member of Bearing Advisors and their Enterprise Partner program, Prevent+Protect.

===== State League Services =====
State League Services supports NLC's founding members, the state municipal leagues, who are essential partners in strengthening local leadership, influencing federal policy, and driving innovative solutions.

===== NLC RISC =====
NLC RISC provides resources and education around property, liability, workers’ compensation, unemployment, and/or employee benefit programs to their 16,000+ member cities, towns, counties and other local government entities.

Jill Eaton is the President/CEO of NLC Mutual Insurance Company.

=== Center of Municipal Practice ===
NLC's Center for Municipal Practice is dedicated to addressing key challenges faced by our member municipalities and cities across the country. These challenges include various critical areas, including housing, public safety and justice, transportation, infrastructure, racial equity, sustainability, economic development, emerging technologies, and more. The center offers technical assistance, educational resources, peer learning and grant opportunities, and innovative ideas that empower local leaders to build and sustain vibrant communities.

=== The Center for LEAD ===
The Center for Leadership, Education, Advancement and Development is the go-to place for city leaders seeking to improve outcomes for children and families. With expertise in early childhood success, education and expanded learning, promoting a culture of health and wellbeing, youth and young adult connections, LEAD reaches cities of all ages and brings together local leaders to develop strategies via technical assistance projects, peer learning networks, leadership academies, and more.

LEAD encompasses the Institute for Youth, Education, and Families (IYEF), the National League of Cities University (NLCU), and the Local Infrastructure Hub. IYEF was founded in 2000 and focuses on transforming how municipal leaders envision their roles in improving outcomes for all children, youth, and families in their communities. The National League of Cities University is a professional development center for elected officials (mayors and city council members) and municipal staff, with trainings and courses designed to enhance local leaders and staff’s ability to govern, work across sectors, manage systems change, and achieve equitable outcomes. The Local Infrastructure Hub is a national program designed to connect cities and towns with the resources and expert advice they need to access federal infrastructure funding to drive local progress, improve communities, and deliver results for residents.

== Publications ==
The National League of Cities oversees a range of publications including the CitiesSpeak blog and podcast, eight email newsletters, and several social media channels. NLC also produces original research on topics such as technology, education, municipal finance, public safety, and mayoral priorities, and more.

== Leadership ==
The National League of Cities is overseen by a 62 member board of directors, which elects a president, vice president, and second vice president in annual elections. Each president serves a one-year term, typically choosing to focus on a single program or advocacy priority such as economic mobility or public safety. NLC's current president is Kevin Kramer, Councilmember of Louisville, Kentucky.

=== Presidents ===
Until the early 1940s, most presidents were the directors of affiliated organizations. Beginning in the 1940s, the organization began appointing mayors of American cities to serve as its president. Since the late-1970s, mayors and city councilors have served as presidents.

| # (order) | President | Years of term | Affiliated organization (director of) | Political party | Note(s) |
|---|---|---|---|---|---|
| 1st | Morris B. Lambire | 1924–26 | League of Minnesota Cities | | |
| 2nd | Morton L. Wallerstein | 1927 | League of Virginia Municipalities | | first of two tenures as president |
| 3rd | A. D. McLarty | 1928 | Illinois Municipal League | | |
| 4th | Don C. Sowers | 1929 | Colorado Municipal League | | |
| 5th | Harvey W. Draper | 1930 | League of Texas Municipalities | | |
| 6th | Sedley H. Phinney | 1931–32 | New Jersey State League of Municipalities | | |
| 7th | Frederick N. MacMillin | 1933 | League of Wisconsin Municipalities | | |
| 8th | Harold D. Smith | 1934 | Michigan Municipal League | | |
| 9th | William P. Capes | 1935 | New York State Conference of Mayors | | |
| 10th | John G. Stutz | 1936 | League of Kansas Municipalities | | |
| 11th | Andrew Joyner Jr. | 1937 | —N/a | | was the incumbent city manager of Greensboro, North Carolina |
| 2nd (2) | Morton L. Wallerstein | 1938 | League of Virginia Municipalities | | second tenure as president |
| 12th | C. C. Ludwig | 1939 | League of Minnesota Cities | | |
| 13th | Richard P. Graves | 1940 | League of California Cities | | |
| 14th | E. E. McAdams | 1941–42 | League of Texas Municipalities | | |
| # (order) | President | Years of term | City (mayor of) | Political party | Note(s) |
| 15th | Charles E. Lee | 1942 & 1943 | Decatur, Illinois | Republican | |
| 16th | Herbert A. Olson | 1944 | —N/a | | director of the Michigan Municipal League |
| 17th | Wilson W. Wyatt | 1945 | Louisville, Kentucky | Democratic | |
| 18th | Earl Riley | 1946 | Portland, Oregon | Democratic | |
| 19th | Woodall Rodgers | 1947 | Dallas, Texas | Democratic | |
| 20th | Fletcher Bowron | 1948 | Los Angeles, California | Republican | |
| 21st | deLesseps Story Morrison | 1949 | New Orleans, Louisiana | Democratic | |
| 22nd | J. Quigg Newton | 1950 | Denver, Colorado | Republican | |
| 23rd | William F. Devin | 1951 | Seattle, Washington | Republican | |
| 24th | Albert Cobo | 1952 | Detroit, Michigan | Republican | |
| 25th | William B. Hartsfield | 1953 | Atlanta, Georgia | Democratic | |
| 26th | William E. Kemp | 1954 | Kansas City, Missouri | Democratic | |
| 27th | Allen C. Thompson | 1955 | Jackson, Mississippi | Democratic | |
| 28th | Robert F. Wagner Jr. | 1956 | New York City, New York | Democratic | |
| 29th | Ben West | 1957 | Nashville, Tennessee | Democratic | |
| 30th | George Christopher | 1958 | San Francisco, California | Republican | |
| 31st | Anthony J. Celebrezze | 1959 | Cleveland, Ohio | Democratic | |
| 32nd | Raymond Tucker | 1960 | St. Louis, Missouri | Democratic | |
| 33rd | Don Hummel | 1961 | Tucson, Arizona | Democratic | |
| 34th | Richardson Dilworth | 1961–62 (Note: August 1961–January 1962) | Philadelphia, Pennsylvania | Democratic | |
| 35th | Gordon S. Clinton | 1962 (Note: January 1962–August 1962) | Seattle, Washington | Democratic | |
| 36th | Lewis Wesley Cutrer | 1963 | Houston, Texas | Democratic | |
| 37th | John F. Collins | 1964 | Boston, Massachusetts | Democratic | |
| 38th | Henry Maier | 1965 | Milwaukee, Wisconsin | Democratic | |
| 39th | Jerome Cavanagh | 1966 | Detroit, Michigan | Democratic | |
| 40th | Harold M. Tollefson | 1967 | Tacoma, Washington | | |
| 41st | James Tate | 1968 | Philadelphia, Pennsylvania | Democratic | |
| 42nd | Beverly Briley | 1969 | Nashville, Tennessee | Democratic | |
| 43rd | Frank Curran | 1970 | San Diego, California | Democratic | |
| 44th | Richard Lugar | 1971 | Indianapolis, Indiana | Republican | |
| 45th | Sam Massell | 1972 | Atlanta, Georgia | Democratic | |
| 46th | Roman Gribbs | 1973 | Detroit, Michigan | Democratic | |
| 47th | Tom Bradley | 1974 | Los Angeles, California | Democratic | |
| 48th | Jake Garn | 1975 (Note: was honorarily made the president for the first two months of 1975) | Salt Lake City, Utah | Republican | |
| 49th | Carlos Romero Barceló | 1975 | San Juan, Puerto Rico | Democratic/New Progressive | |
| 50th | Hans Tanzler | 1976 | Jacksonville, Florida | Democratic | |
| 51st | Phyllis Lamphere | 1977 | —N/a | | member of the city council of Seattle, Washington; first woman to serve as president of NLC; first non-mayor to serve as president of NLC since the 1940s |
| 52nd | Tom Moody | 1978 | Columbus, Ohio | Republican | |
| 53rd | John Rousakis | 1979 | Savannah, Georgia | Democratic | |
| 54th | Jessie M. Rattley | 1980 | —N/a | Democratic | member of the city council of Newport News, Virginia |
| 55th | William H. Hudnut III | 1981 | Indianapolis, Indiana | Republican | |
| 56th | Ferd L. Harrison | 1982 | Scotland Neck, North Carolina | Democratic | |
| 57th | Charles Royer | 1983 | Seattle, Washington | independent | |
| 58th | George Latimer | 1984 | St. Paul, Minnesota | Democratic | |
| 59th | George Voinovich | 1985 | Cleveland, Ohio | Republican | |
| 60th | Henry Cisneros | 1986 | San Antonio, Texas | Democratic | |
| 61st | Cathy Reynolds | 1987 | —N/a | | member of the city council of Denver, Colorado |
| 62nd | Pamela P. Plumb | 1988 | —N/a | | member of the city council of Portland, Maine |
| 63rd | Terry Goddard | 1989 | Phoenix, Arizona | Democratic | |
| 64th | Bob Bolen | 1990 | Fort Worth, Texas | | |
| 65th | Sidney Barthelemy | 1991 | New Orleans, Louisiana | Democratic | |
| 66th | Glenda Hood | 1992 | —N/a | Republican | member of the city council of Orlando, Florida |
| 67th | Donald M. Fraser | 1993 | Minneapolis, Minnesota | Democratic | |
| 68th | Sharpe James | 1994 | Newark, New Jersey | Democratic | |
| 69th | Carolyn Long Banks | 1995 | —N/a | | member of the city council of Atlanta, Georgia |
| 70th | Greg Lashutka | 1996 | Columbus, Ohio | Republican | |
| 71st | Mark Schwartz | 1997 | —N/a | | member of the city council of Oklahoma City, Oklahoma |
| 72nd | Brian J. O'Neill | 1998 | —N/a | Republican | member of the city council of Philadelphia |
| 73rd | Clarence E. Anthony | 1999 | South Bay, Florida | Democratic | later named NLC executive director in 2013 |
| 74th | Robert G. Knight | 2000 | Wichita, Kansas | Republican | |
| 75th | Dennis Archer | 2001 | Detroit, Michigan | Democratic | |
| 76th | Karen J. Anderson | 2002 | Minnetonka, Minnesota | Republican | |
| 77th | John DeStefano Jr. | 2003 | New Haven, Connecticut | Democratic | |
| 78th | Charles H. Lyons | 2004 | —N/a | | member of the board of selectmen of Arlington, Massachusetts |
| 79th | Anthony A. Williams | 2005 | Washington, D.C. | Democratic | |
| 80th | James C. Hunt | 2006 | —N/a | | member of the city council of Clarksburg, West Virginia |
| 81st | Bart Peterson | 2007 | Indianapolis, Indiana | Democratic | |
| 82nd | Cynthia McCollum | 2008 | —N/a | | member of the city council of Madison, Wisconsin |
| 83rd | Kathleen Novak | 2009 | Northglenn, Colorado | | |
| 84th | Ronald O. Loveridge | 2010 | Riverside, California | Democratic | |
| 85th | James Mitchell Jr. | 2011 | —N/a | Democratic | member of the city council of Charlotte, North Carolina |
| 86th | Ted Ellis | 2012 | Bluffton, Indiana | Democratic | |
| 87th | Marie Lopez Rodgers | 2013 | Avondale, Arizona | Democratic | |
| 88th | Chris Coleman | 2014 | St. Paul, Minnesota | Democratic | |
| 89th | Ralph Becker | 2015 | Salt Lake City, Utah | Democratic | |
| 90th | Melode Colbert-Kean | 2016 | Joplin, Missouri | | |
| 91st | Matt Zone | 2017 | —N/a | Democratic | member of the city council of Cleveland, Ohio |
| 92nd | Mark Stodola | 2018 | Little Rock, Arkansas | Democratic | |
| 93rd | Karen Freeman-Wilson | 2019 | Gary, Indiana | Democratic | |
| 94th | Joe Buscaino | 2020 | —N/a | Democratic | member of the city council of Los Angeles, California |
| 95th | Kathy Maness | 2021 | —N/a | Republican | member of the city council of Lexington, South Carolina |
| 96th | Vince Williams | 2022 | Union City, Georgia | | |
| 97th | Victoria Woodards | 2023 | Tacoma, Washington | Democratic | |
| 98th | David Sander | 2024 | Rancho Cordova, California | Republican | |
| 99th | Sharon Weston Broome | 2024 (Note: November 16, 2024–January 1, 2025) | Baton Rouge, Louisiana | Democratic | |
| 100th | Steve Patterson | 2025 | Athens, Ohio | Democratic | |
| 101st | Kevin Kramer | 2026 | —N/a | Republican | member of the city council of Louisville, Kentucky |

==== States and territories by number of officials that served as NLC president ====
| Number of presidents | State/territory | Presidents |
|---|---|---|
| 8 | California | Richard P. Graves (1940); Fletcher Bowron (1948); George Christopher (1958); Frank Curran (1970); Tom Bradley (1970); Ronald O. Loveridge (2010); Joe Buscaino (2020); David Sander (2024) |
| 6 | Michigan | Harold D. Smith (1934); Herbert A. Olson (1944); Albert Cobo (1952); Jerome Cavanagh (1966); Roman Gribbs (1973); Dennis Archer (2001) |
| 6 | Minnesota | Morris B. Lambire (1924–26); C. C. Ludwig (1939); George Latimer (1984); Donald M. Fraser (1993); Karen J. Anderson (2002); Chris Coleman (2014) |
| 6 | Ohio | Anthony J. Celebrezze (1959); Tom Moody (1978); George Voinovich (1985); Greg Lashutka (1996); Matt Zone (2017); Steve Patterson (2025) |
| 6 | Texas | Harvey W. Draper (1930); E. E. McAdams (1941–42); Woodall Rodgers (1947); Lewis Wesley Cutrer (1963); Henry Cisneros (1986); Bob Bolen (1990) |
| 6 | Washington | William F. Devin (1951); Gordon S. Clinton (1962); Harold M. Tollefson (1967); Phyllis Lamphere (1977); Charles Royer (1983); Victoria Woodards (2023) |
| 5 | Georgia | William B. Hartsfield (1953); Sam Massell (1972); John Rousakis (1979); Carolyn Long Banks (1995); Vince Williams (2022) |
| 5 | Indiana | Richard Lugar (1971); William H. Hudnut (1981); Bart Peterson (2007); Ted Ellis (2012); Karen Freeman-Wilson (2019) |
| 4 | Colorado | Don C. Sowers (1929); J. Quigg Newton (1950); Cathy Reynolds (1987); Kathleen Novak (2009) |
| 3 | Arizona | Don Hummel (1961); Terry Goddard (1989); Marie Lopez Rodgers (2013) |
| 3 | Florida | Hans Tanzler (1976); Glenda Hood (1992); Clarence E. Anthony (1999) |
| 3 | Louisiana | deLesseps Story Morrison (1949); Sidney Barthelemy (1991); Sharon Weston Broome (2024) |
| 3 | Missouri | William E. Kemp (1954); Raymond Tucker (1960); Melode Colbert-Kean (2016) |
| 3 | North Carolina | Andrew Joyner Jr. (1937); Ferd L. Harrison (1982); James Mitchell Jr. (2011) |
| 3 | Wisconsin | Frederick N. MacMillin (1933); Henry Maier (1965); Cynthia McCollum (2008) |
| 2 | Massachusetts | John F. Collins (1964); Charles H. Lyons (2004) |
| 2 | Pennsylvania | Richardson Dilworth (1961–62); James Tate (1968) |
| 2 | Kansas | John G. Stutz (1936); Robert G. Knight (2000) |
| 2 | New Jersey | Sedley H. Phinney (1931–32); Sharpe James (1994) |
| 2 | Illinois | A. D. McLarty (1928); Charles E. Lee (1942 & 1943) |
| 2 | New York | William P. Capes (1935); Robert F. Wagner Jr. (1956) |
| 2 | Tennessee | Ben West (1957); Beverly Briley (1969) |
| 2 | Utah | Jake Garn (1975); Ralph Becker (2015) |
| 2 | Virginia | Morton L. Wallerstein (1927 & 1938); Jessie M. Rattley (1980) |
| 1 | Arkansas | Mark Stodola (2018) |
| 1 | District of Columbia | Anthony A. Williams (2005) |
| 1 | Connecticut | John DeStefano Jr. (2003) |
| 1 | Maine | Pamela P. Plumb (1988) |
| 1 | Mississippi | Allen C. Thompson (1955) |
| 1 | Oklahoma | Mark Schartz (1997) |
| 1 | Puerto Rico | Carlos Romero Barceló (1975) |
| 1 | South Carolina | Kathy Maness (2021) |
| 1 | West Virginia | James C. Hunt (2006) |
| 0 | Alabama | —N/a |
| 0 | Alaska | —N/a |
| 0 | American Samoa | —N/a |
| 0 | Delaware | —N/a |
| 0 | Hawaii | —N/a |
| 0 | Iowa | —N/a |
| 0 | Idaho | —N/a |
| 0 | Maryland | —N/a |
| 0 | Montana | —N/a |
| 0 | Nevada | —N/a |
| 0 | Nebraska | —N/a |
| 0 | New Hampshire | —N/a |
| 0 | New Mexico | —N/a |
| 0 | North Dakota | —N/a |
| 0 | Rhode Island | —N/a |
| 0 | South Dakota | —N/a |
| 0 | United States Virgin Islands | —N/a |
| 0 | Vermont | —N/a |
| 0 | Wyoming | —N/a |

==== City governments from which multiple presidents have hailed ====
| Number of presidents | City | Presidents |
|---|---|---|
| 4 | Detroit | Albert Cobo (1952); Jerome Cavanagh (1966); Roman Gribbs (1973); Dennis Archer (2001) |
| 4 | Seattle | William F. Devin (1951); Gordon S. Clinton (1962); Phyllis Lamphere (1977); Charles Royer (1983) |
| 3 | Los Angeles | Fletcher Bowron (1948); Tom Bradley (1974); Joe Buscaino (2020) |
| 3 | Atlanta | William B. Hartsfield (1953); Sam Massell (1972); Carolyn Long Banks (1995) |
| 3 | Cleveland | Anthony J. Celebrezze (1959); George Voinovich (1985); Matt Zone (2017) |
| 3 | Indianapolis | Richard Lugar (1971); William H. Hudnut III (1981); Bart Peterson (2007) |
| 3 | Philadelphia | Richardson Dilworth (1961–62); James Tate (1968); Brian J. O'Neill (1998) |
| 2 | Columbus, OH | Tom Moody (politician) (1978); George Lashutka (1996) |
| 2 | Denver | J. Quigg Newton (1950); Cathy Reynolds (1987) |
| 2 | New Orleans | deLesseps Story Morrison (1949); Sidney Barthelemy (1991) |
| 2 | Nashville | Ben West (1957); Beverly Briley (1969) |
| 2 | St. Paul, MN | George Latimer (1984); Chris Coleman (2014) |
| 2 | Tacoma, WA | Harold M. Tollefson (1967); Victoria Woodards (2023) |

==== Presidents by category of concurrent government office ====
| Number of presidents | Government office held concurrently |
|---|---|
| 70 | Mayor |
| 15 | Councilmember |
| 15 | No government office (director of affiliated organization) |
| 1 | City Manager |
| 1 | Selectman |

== See also ==
- Local government in the United States
- United States Conference of Mayors
- National Association of Counties
- International City/County Management Association
- National Governors Association
- National Conference of State Legislatures
- The Council of State Governments
- Sister Cities International
- List of micro-regional organizations
- List of state Municipal Leagues
