= West Virginia Municipal League =

The West Virginia Municipal League (WVML) is a voluntary, nonprofit, nonpartisan group that works to support and unite all 230 municipal governments in the state of West Virginia. WVML was founded in 1968 and is located in Charleston, West Virginia. As a member of the National League of Cities, the WVML is able to offer legislative representation in Washington, D.C., and connections to other municipal governments throughout the United States.

== WVML board ==
=== Current board ===
- President - Randy Barrett (Winfield, West Virginia)
- Vice President - Scott James (St. Albans, West Virginia)
- Secretary - Robbie Skinner (Buckhannon, West Virginia)
- Treasurer - Amy Shuler-Goodwin (Charleston, West Virginia)

=== Previous WVML presidents ===
- David Felinton (Huntington, West Virginia)
- Tom Joyce (Parkersburg, West Virginia)
- Kevin Knowles (Martinsburg, West Virginia)
- Serafino Nolletti (Logan, West Virginia)
- Chris Tatum (Barboursville, West Virginia)
- Stephen T. Williams (Huntington, West Virginia)
- Terry Williams (Spencer, West Virginia)

== See also ==
- List of state Municipal Leagues
