= South Bay, Florida =

- City
- City of South Bay
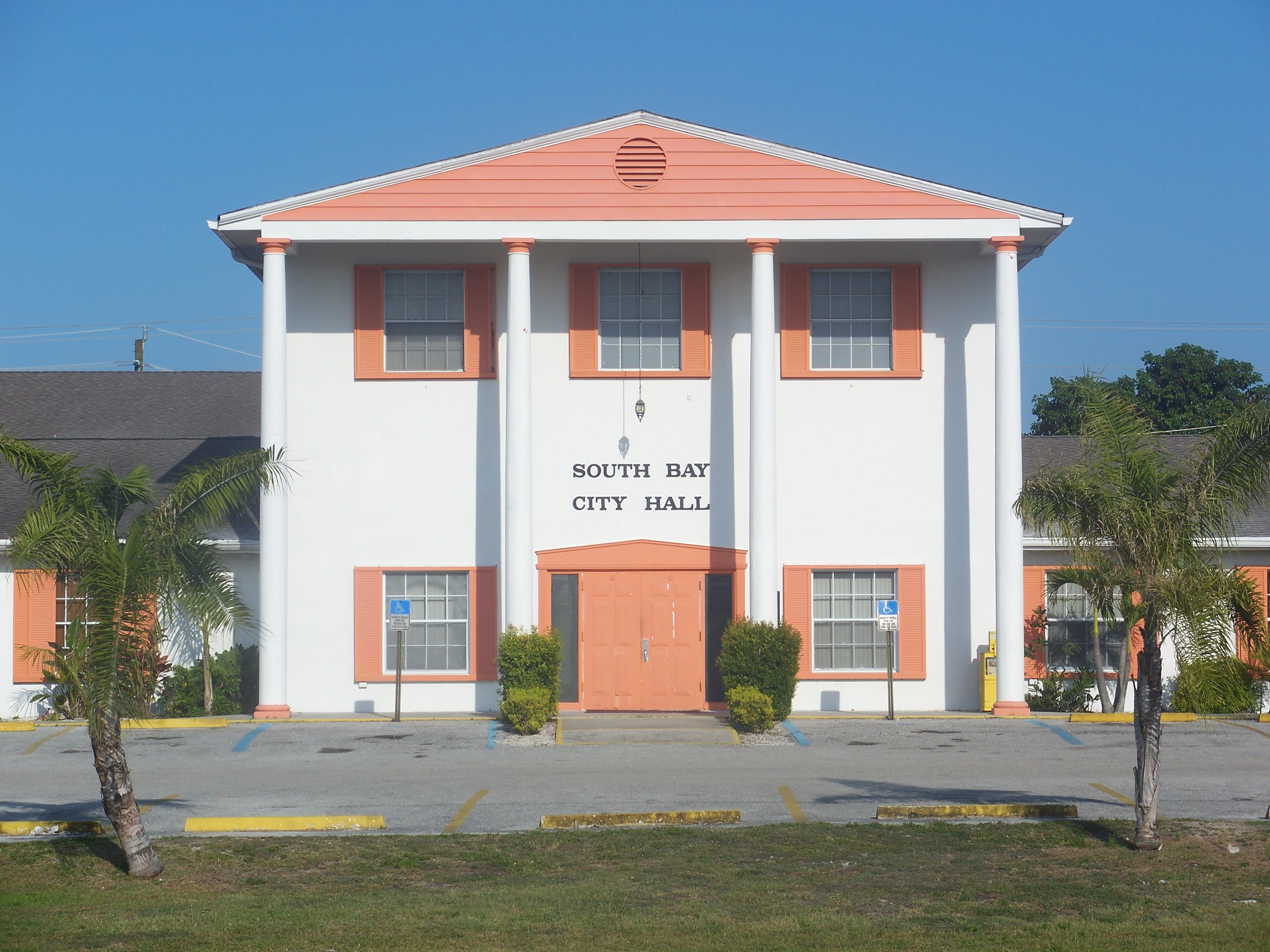

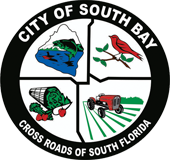
- Seal
- Motto: "Cross Roads of South Florida"
- Location of South Bay, Florida
- Coordinates: 26°41′24″N 80°44′18″W
- Country: United States
- State: Florida
- County: Palm Beach
- Incorporation: 1941

Government
  - Type: Commissioner-Manager

Area
  - Total: 3.93 sq mi (10.17 km^{2})
  - Land: 2.86 sq mi (7.41 km^{2})
  - Water: 1.07 sq mi (2.76 km^{2})
- Elevation: 13 ft (4.0 m)

Population (2020)
  - Total: 4,860
  - Density: 1,698.4/sq mi (655.76/km^{2})
- Time zone: UTC-5 (Eastern (EST))
  - Summer (DST): UTC-4 (EDT)
- ZIP code: 33493
- Area codes: 561, 728
- FIPS code: 12-67175
- GNIS feature ID: 2405487
- Website: City of South Bay Florida

South Bay is a city in Palm Beach County, Florida, United States. It is the westernmost municipality in the South Florida metropolitan area. As of the 2020 census, South Bay had a population of 4,860. While the current estimates place South Bay's population in the incorporated city limits at more than 4,000 people, surrounding areas increase the population figures to 54,000 people in a 25-mile (40 km) radius and more than 1.4 million in a 50-mile (80 km) radius.

== History ==
South Bay was named for its location on Lake Okeechobee. The town was incorporated in 1941. The first mayor of South Bay was Aubrey (a.k.a. "Orb") Walker, who, along with his brother, Haughty D. Walker (a.k.a. "Haught"), survived the great hurricane of 1928 by gathering his family members onto a boat in the canal.

== Geography ==
South Bay is located near the southern bank of Lake Okeechobee.

According to the United States Census Bureau, the city has a total area of 3.7 square miles (9.6 km^{2}), including 2.7 square miles (7.0 km^{2}) of land and 1.0 square mile (2.6 km^{2}) of (26.95%) water. The Lake Okeechobee Scenic Trail runs through South Bay.

=== Climate ===
South Bay has a humid subtropical climate (Köppen: Cfa). The all time record high of 98 °F (37 °C) was recorded on July 12th, 2010 and August 7th and 9th, 2016, whilst the all time record low of 26 °F (-3 °C) was recorded on January 19th and 20th, 2014. South Bay is in the USDA Plant Hardiness Zone 10a.

Climate data for South Bay 15 S, Florida, 1991–2020 normals, extremes 2002–present
Month	Jan	Feb	Mar	Apr	May	Jun	Jul	Aug	Sep	Oct	Nov	Dec	Year
Record high °F (°C)	87 (31)	89 (32)	92 (33)	95 (35)	97 (36)	97 (36)	98 (37)	98 (37)	96 (36)	93 (34)	92 (33)	89 (32)	98 (37)
Mean maximum °F (°C)	84.1 (28.9)	85.9 (29.9)	88.1 (31.2)	90.8 (32.7)	91.9 (33.3)	93.7 (34.3)	94.9 (34.9)	94.3 (34.6)	92.9 (33.8)	90.9 (32.7)	87.0 (30.6)	85.1 (29.5)	95.5 (35.3)
Mean daily maximum °F (°C)	75.6 (24.2)	78.1 (25.6)	80.4 (26.9)	84.0 (28.9)	87.3 (30.7)	89.6 (32.0)	91.3 (32.9)	91.3 (32.9)	89.5 (31.9)	86.3 (30.2)	81.5 (27.5)	77.6 (25.3)	84.4 (29.1)
Daily mean °F (°C)	63.8 (17.7)	66.3 (19.1)	68.7 (20.4)	72.5 (22.5)	76.8 (24.9)	80.7 (27.1)	82.1 (27.8)	82.5 (28.1)	81.0 (27.2)	76.9 (24.9)	70.8 (21.6)	66.5 (19.2)	74.0 (23.3)
Mean daily minimum °F (°C)	52.0 (11.1)	54.4 (12.4)	57.0 (13.9)	61.0 (16.1)	66.3 (19.1)	71.9 (22.2)	72.8 (22.7)	73.7 (23.2)	72.5 (22.5)	67.4 (19.7)	60.2 (15.7)	55.4 (13.0)	63.7 (17.6)
Mean minimum °F (°C)	34.9 (1.6)	38.5 (3.6)	42.5 (5.8)	50.1 (10.1)	57.7 (14.3)	67.5 (19.7)	69.9 (21.1)	70.7 (21.5)	68.2 (20.1)	55.5 (13.1)	45.1 (7.3)	41.6 (5.3)	32.6 (0.3)
Record low °F (°C)	26 (−3)	30 (−1)	35 (2)	42 (6)	50 (10)	64 (18)	67 (19)	69 (21)	64 (18)	43 (6)	35 (2)	28 (−2)	26 (−3)
Average precipitation inches (mm)	2.50 (64)	2.30 (58)	2.81 (71)	2.89 (73)	4.78 (121)	9.63 (245)	7.93 (201)	8.49 (216)	7.45 (189)	4.05 (103)	2.22 (56)	2.11 (54)	57.16 (1,452)
Source: NOAA (mean maxima/minima 2006–present)

== Infrastructure ==
=== Transportation ===
Two major roads, East-West State Road 80 and North-South U.S. 27 intersect in the town.

== Mayors ==
Image	Mayor	Years of service	Notes
	Aubrey "Orb" Walker	1941–?	
		–	
	John Deaton	?–1974	
	Vernita Cox	1974; 1974–1975	First African American mayor in Palm Beach County; Named mayor by the City Council after then-mayor John Deaton resigned in January 1974. Was elected along with Esther Berry as the first Black and first women councilmembers of South Bay in September 1972.
	Jay S. Smith	1975–1976	
	Donald Tanner	1976–1977	
	Billy Wells	1977–1978	
		?–?	
		?–?	
	Donald Tanner	?–1984	
	Clarence E. Anthony	1984–2008	
	Shirley Walker Turner	2008–2012	
	Shanique Scott	2012–2016	
	Joe Kyles	2016–present	

== Demographics ==
Historical population
Census	Pop.	Note	%±
1950	1,050		—
1960	1,631		55.3%
1970	2,958		81.4%
1980	3,886		31.4%
1990	3,558		−8.4%
2000	3,859		8.5%
2010	4,876		26.4%
2020	4,860		−0.3%
U.S. Decennial Census

=== Racial and ethnic composition ===
South Bay city, Florida – Racial and ethnic composition Note: the US Census treats Hispanic/Latino as an ethnic category. This table excludes Latinos from the racial categories and assigns them to a separate category. Hispanics/Latinos may be of any race.
Race / Ethnicity (NH = Non-Hispanic)	Pop 2000	Pop 2010	Pop 2020	% 2000	% 2010	% 2020
White alone (NH)	481	558	580	12.46%	11.44%	11.93%
Black or African American alone (NH)	2,557	3,120	3,097	66.26%	63.99%	63.72%
Native American or Alaska Native alone (NH)	11	7	2	0.29%	0.14%	0.04%
Asian alone (NH)	10	25	2	0.26%	0.51%	0.04%
Native Hawaiian or Pacific Islander alone (NH)	1	1	1	0.03%	0.02%	0.02%
Other race alone (NH)	0	2	7	0.00%	0.04%	0.14%
Mixed race or Multiracial (NH)	44	31	73	1.14%	0.64%	1.50%
Hispanic or Latino (any race)	755	1,132	1,098	19.56%	23.22%	22.59%
Total	3,859	4,876	4,860	100.00%	100.00%	100.00%

=== 2020 census ===
As of the 2020 census, South Bay had a population of 4,860.

The median age was 36.6 years. 23.5% of residents were under the age of 18 and 9.2% of residents were 65 years of age or older. For every 100 females there were 186.2 males, and for every 100 females age 18 and over there were 220.3 males age 18 and over.

97.2% of residents lived in urban areas, while 2.8% lived in rural areas.

There were 1,022 households in South Bay, of which 47.7% had children under the age of 18 living in them. Of all households, 35.3% were married-couple households, 17.5% were households with a male householder and no spouse or partner present, and 37.3% were households with a female householder and no spouse or partner present. About 19.8% of all households were made up of individuals and 7.1% had someone living alone who was 65 years of age or older.

There were 1,099 housing units, of which 7.0% were vacant. The homeowner vacancy rate was 0.2% and the rental vacancy rate was 2.6%.

=== Demographic estimates ===
The 2020 American Community Survey 5-year estimates reported 614 families residing in the city.

=== 2010 census ===
As of the 2010 United States census, there were 4,876 people, 843 households, and 746 families residing in the city.

=== 2000 census ===
As of the census of 2000, there were 3,859 people, 805 households, and 644 families residing in the city. The population density was 1,425.4 inhabitants per square mile (550.4/km^{2}). There were 935 housing units at an average density of 345.4 per square mile (133.4/km^{2}). The racial makeup of the city was 12.5% White (non-Hispanic), 66.93% Black or African American, 19.56% Hispanic or Latino of any race, 0.29% Native American, 0.26% Asian, 0.03% Pacific Islander, 5.83% from other races, and 2.44% from two or more races.

In 2000, there were 805 households, out of which 41.7% had children under the age of 18 living with them, 39.5% were married couples living together, 32.0% had a female householder with no husband present, and 20.0% were non-families. 15.8% of all households were made up of individuals, and 4.7% had someone living alone who was 65 years of age or older. The average household size was 3.39 and the average family size was 3.76.

In 2000, in the city, the population was spread out, with 27.0% under the age of 18, 9.3% from 18 to 24, 37.3% from 25 to 44, 20.4% from 45 to 64, and 6.0% who were 65 years of age or older. The median age was 32 years. For every 100 females, there were 172.5 males. For every 100 females age 18 and over, there were 210.6 males.

In 2000, the median income for a household in the city was $23,558, and the median income for a family was $26,944. Males had a median income of $21,087 versus $22,321 for females. The per capita income for the city was $9,126. About 29.2% of families and 36.7% of the population were below the poverty line, including 48.4% of those under age 18 and 27.4% of those age 65 or over.

As of 2000, speakers of English made up 77.76% of all residents, while Spanish comprised 21.51%, and French as a mother tongue accounted for 0.72% of the population.
