= Oregon State University College of Business =

Coordinates: 44.56494°N 123.28197°W

- Type: Public
- Established: 1908
- Parent institution: Oregon State University
- Accreditation: Association to Advance Collegiate Schools of Business
- Dean: Tim Carroll
- Undergraduates: 4,000
- Location: Corvallis, Oregon, US
- Colors: Orange and black
- Website: business.oregonstate.edu

The Oregon State University College of Business is one of 12 colleges based at Oregon State University's Corvallis, Oregon campus. The college offers business coursework and degrees to students studying at the main campus, OSU-Cascades campus in Bend, or anywhere in the world through the university's Ecampus. Coursework in business has been offered at OSU since the late 1800s, making the college one of the oldest public business schools in the state.

As of 2022, the college of business claimed an enrollment of nearly 4,000 students. The college offers undergraduate degrees in accounting, business information systems, finance, management, marketing, apparel design, graphic design, interior design and merchandising management. An MBA program is also offered through the college with tracks in organizational leadership, accountancy, business analytics, commercialization, global operations, marketing, research thesis, and wealth management. Classes in business analytics are offered in Portland, in addition to Corvallis, as well as a track in executive leadership. In 2014, the college expanded graduate-level instruction by adding a Ph.D. program with options in accounting and innovation/commercialization

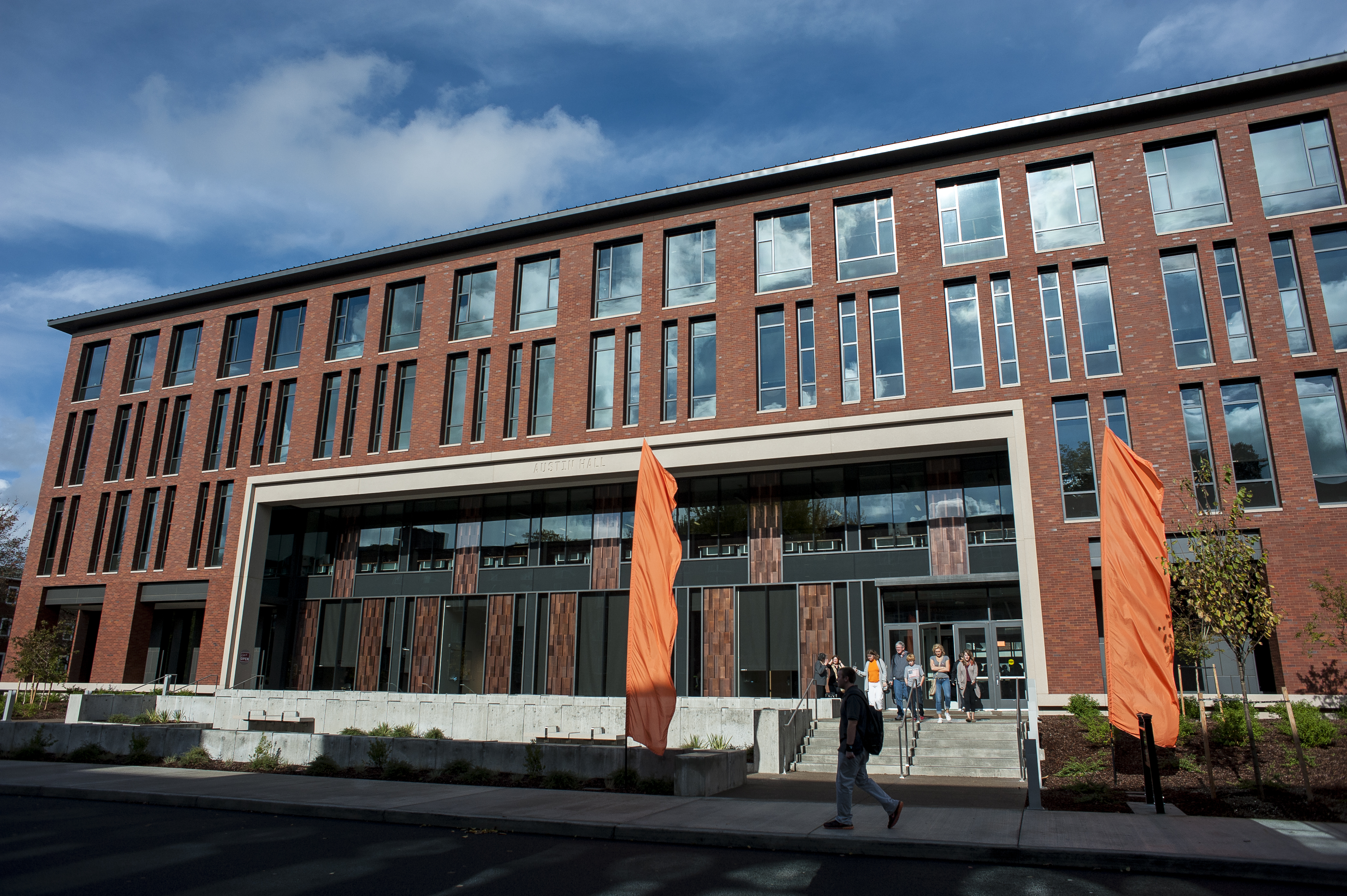
Oregon State University College of Business Admin Building (Austin Hall).

The college moved into its new $55 million, 100,000-square-foot home in 2014. Austin Hall is named after college alumnus and A-dec founder Ken Austin and his wife, Joan, who are the principal donors for the building project. The college's Austin Entrepreneurship Program and Austin Family Business Program are also named after the longtime university philanthropists.

== History ==
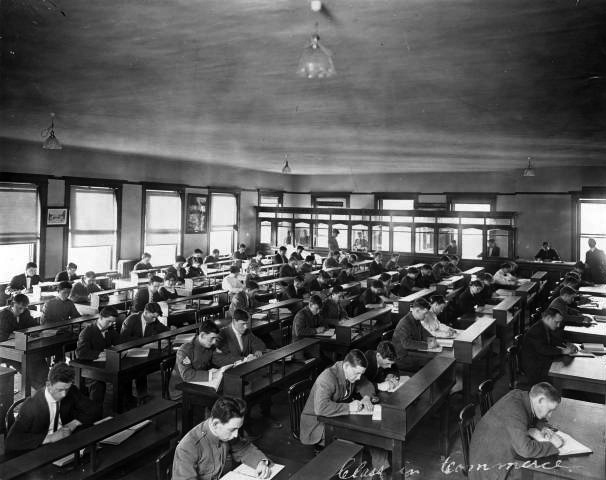
Business class in Bexell Hall on the Oregon State University campus in 1910.

Instruction in business was first offered at OSU in 1898, and the first degree in business was awarded in 1904. Four years later, the university created the school of commerce, naming John Andrew Bexell as dean. Over the period Bexell headed the school, the name changed three times. It was briefly known as the Division of Business and Industry, then the School of Business and Technology, and finally the School of Business. Oregon State stood as the only public university in the state to offer a degree in business through 1914. In 1922 the school moved into the new Commerce Hall, which was renamed Bexell Hall in 1966. In 1983 the program was renamed the OSU College of Business.

For several deans, changes in leadership were infrequent. Bexell was on the job for 23 years, following a 10-year hiatus in business degree curriculum during the Great Depression. Clifford E. Maser then took over and served for 24 years with one year on hiatus in 1963, followed by Earl Goddard, who held the post for 15 years. Currently, Tim Carroll serves as the college's 12th dean.

== Programs ==
- Accounting
- Apparel Design
- Business Administration
- Business Analytics
- Business Information Systems
- Designs & Innovation Management
- Hospitality Management
- Interior Design
- Marketing
- Management
- Merchandising Management
- Supply Chain & Logistics Management

== Doctoral programs ==
The college offers a Ph.D. in business administration with optional areas of concentration in accounting, strategy, and entrepreneurship and innovation. The pharmacy Ph.D./MBA, dual degree program is also available for pharmacy Ph.D. students seeking managerial or executive roles in the pharmaceutical industry.

== Notable alumni ==
- Edward Allworth, World War I Medal of Honor recipient.
- Ken Austin, founder and CEO of A-dec, one of the largest dental equipment companies in the world.
- Kevin Cameron, a former state representative from Salem, Oregon, founder and CEO of a Portland, Oregon restaurant chain.
- Mitch Canham, Oregon State University Baseball head coach.
- Wes Edens, co-founder of Fortress Investment Group and founder of New Fortress Energy, billionaire private equity investor.
- Arnold J. Funk, American brigadier general during the Battle of Bataan.
- Larry George, former state senator and Portland area radio talk show host, current CEO of a local hazelnut packing company.
- Carrie Halsell Ward, first African American to graduate from an Oregon public university (1926) and namesake of an OSU residence hall.
- Jan Hoag, Oscar-nominated movie/TV actor, starred on shows, such as Murder, She Wrote, Step by Step, Married... with Children, Melrose Place, Murphy Brown.
- Judi Hofer, former top executive of The May Department Stores Company, now owned by Macy's
- John Hubert Hall, served as the 24th governor of Oregon.
- Rich McCormick, Georgia US Representative and former emergency room physician
- Brian McMenamin, national craft brewer, Northwest restaurateur and hotel proprietor, manages 27 breweries
- Bernie Newcomb, E-Trade co-founder
- Norris Poulson, former mayor of Los Angeles, California and California state senator.
- Joth Ricci, former CEO of Dutch Bros. Coffee, former chair of the Oregon Business Commission, and currently OSU COB executive-in-residence.
- Mike Rich, acclaimed American screenwriter
- Don Robert, American businessman and chairman of Experian
- Dick Spady, founder of Seattle area landmark drive-in chain, Dick's Drive-In.

== Deans ==
- 1908–31: John Andrew Bexell
- 1931–41: Degree curriculum suspended, no Dean
- 1942–62: Clifford E. Maser
- 1963: Cliff Gray (interim)
- 1964–66: Clifford E. Maser
- 1967: E.E. Easton (interim)
- 1968-83: Earl E. Goddard
- 1984–90: M. Lynn Spruill
- 1990: Wilbur Widicus (interim)
- 1991–2000: Donald F. Parker
- 2001–02: Sabah Randhawa (interim)
- 2003–15: Ilene K. Kleinsorge
- 2015–2019: Mitzi Montoya
- 2019–2021: Jim Coakley (interim)
- 2021–present: Tim Carroll
