= Build America Mutual =

American bond insurance company

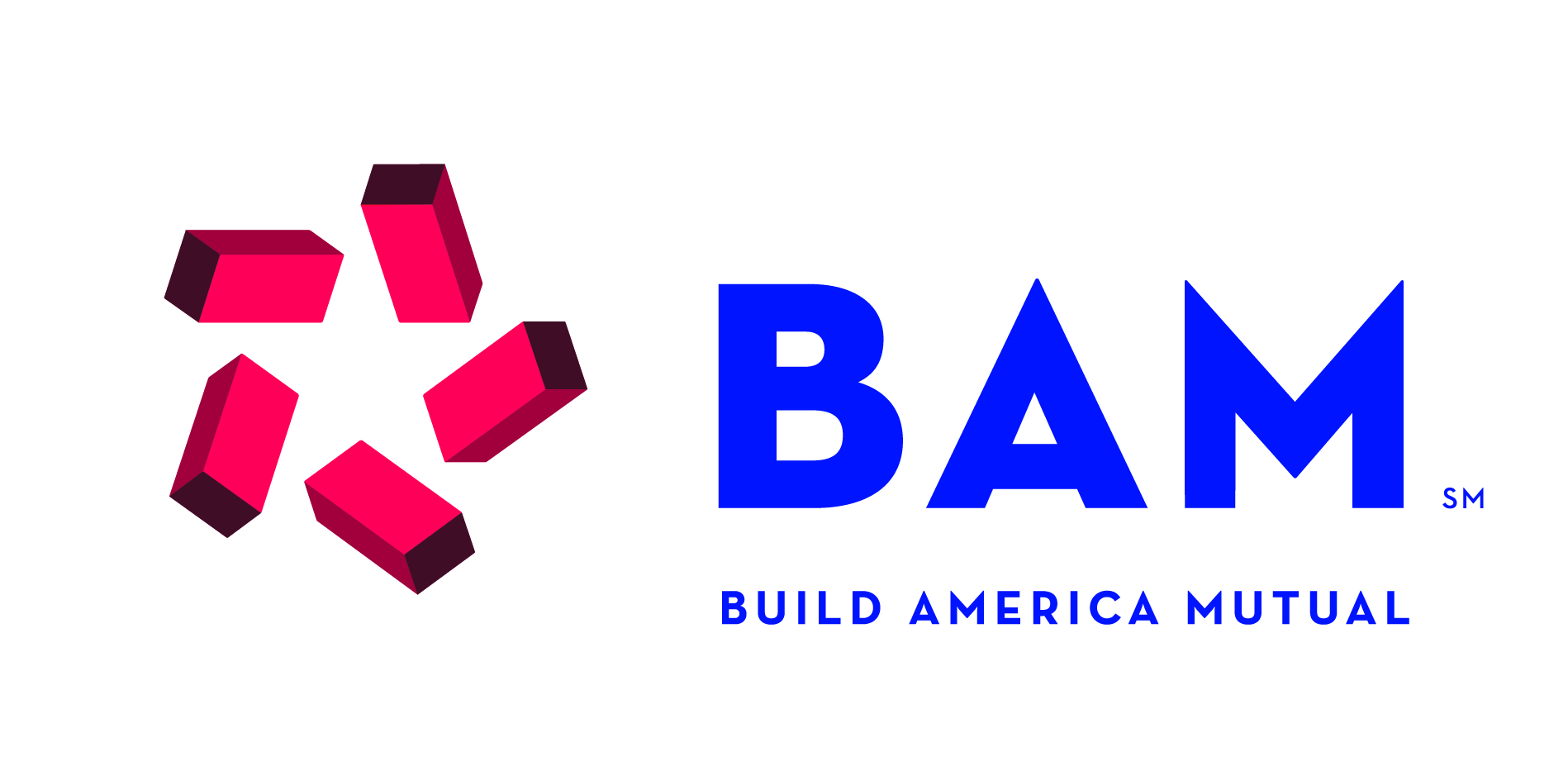
- Company type: Mutual
- Industry: Financial Guaranty Insurance
- Founded: 2012
- Founders: Seán W. McCarthy, CEO; Robert P. Cochran
- Headquarters: New York, New York, United States
- Key people: Seán W. McCarthy (CEO); Suzanne Finnegan (Chief Credit Officer); Elizabeth Keys (CFO); Laura Levenstein (Chief Risk Officer)
- Number of employees: 80

Build America Mutual Assurance Company (stylized as Build America Mutual or BAM) is a mutual, monoline bond insurer of essential public-purpose U.S. municipal bonds. Since its inception in July 2012, the company has insured more than $65 billion in par amount for more than 3,300 member-issuers. In 2018, it insured $8.36 billion par across 653 new-issue insured transactions. BAM also publishes a credit profile for every transaction it insures and updates them. More than 6,000 are now available. The company is the preferred provider of financial guaranty insurance on debt for member municipalities of the National League of Cities. NLC endorsed BAM upon its launch.

== Key people ==
Build America Mutual's leadership consists of a seven-member board of directors, including its co-founders, Robert Cochran, who served as chairman, and chief executive officer Seán McCarthy. Previously, Cochran co-founded Financial Security Assurance and was its CEO from 1990 to 2009. McCarthy was president and chief operating officer of bond insurer Assured Guaranty Corp. following its acquisition of Financial Security Assurance in July 2009.

Its seven-member board includes three designated representatives of the public-sector issuers who used BAM to insure their bonds. The original public representatives included former Pennsylvania Gov. Ed Rendell and former New York Lieutenant Governor Richard Ravitch. Ravitch left the board in September 2016 and was replaced by longtime municipal advisor John White. Rendell left the board in April 2019 and was replaced by municipal analyst Natalie Cohen. On May 7, 2020, the board elected Manning Rountree to succeed Cochran as Chairman, and added Clarence E. Anthony, the CEO of the National League of Cities, as an independent director.

On Jan. 17, 2018, the company formed a strategic advisory committee that will advise management on opportunities to build on the company's track record.

Its charter members include Dan Keating, former chief operating officer of Samuel A. Ramirez & Co.; Chris Hamel, former municipal finance head at RBC Capital Markets; Thalia Meehan, who sits on the board of the Boston women in public finance and is a past member of the Municipal Securities Rulemaking Board investor advisory group; and Ken Williams, the retired head of municipal securities for Stifel Financial Group.

In February 2018, the company named Grant Dewey, a former managing director at Citigroup’s municipal bond division, as head of municipal capital markets.

On 9 May 2020, Build America Mutual and Assured Guaranty have accounted for $7.30 billion in 563 sales, up from the $5.99 billion spanning 490 transactions that wreak havoc on governmental and local income due to COVID-19.

== Inception ==
The 2008 financial crisis effectively devastated the once-thriving industry. While few insured municipal bonds defaulted, bond insurers who had expended into structured finance were ravaged by losses on mortgage-backed securities and collateralized debt obligations.

Build America Mutual opened in July 2012, with the once-thriving bond insurance industry still reeling. While insured bonds accounted for more than half of the market in 2005, merely 4% percent of muni issues were insured in the first half of 2012.

BAM began writing coverage that September, after the New York State Department of Financial Services issued its license. The company’s initial focus was issues of less than $75 million. According to the state, the company was initially capitalized with $600 million in financing. It subsequently expanded to insure some larger issues, and added $100 million to its claims-paying resources through a reinsurance agreement with Fidus Re Ltd.

Additionally, its mutual model generated capital growth to support growth in the insured portfolio, thus eliminating the need to “go public” to raise capital or to assume risks beyond the core municipal market; and it cited the benefit of collateralized first-loss reinsurance protection for losses up to the first 15% of par on each policy written.

== Ratings ==
BAM has been rated AA by S&P since its inception. On June 6, 2017, S&P placed BAM and National Public Finance Guarantee Corp., another insurer, on credit watch with negative implications, saying it “may adjust certain ratings based on a company's competitive strengths or weaknesses relative to its peers,” but it reaffirmed BAM's AA rating later that month.
