= Michigan Municipal League =

Nonprofit association of municipalities

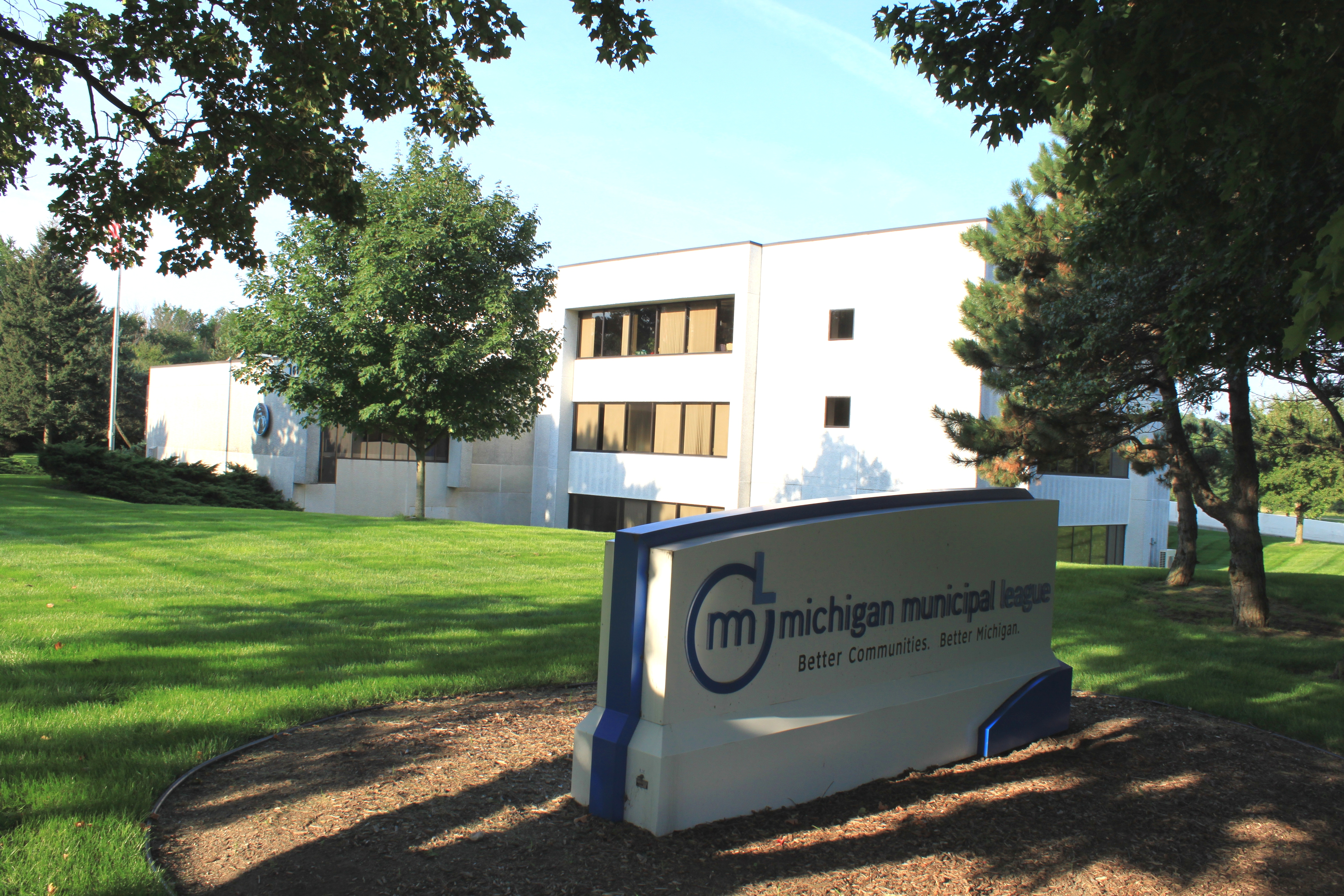
Michigan Municipal League headquarters in Ann Arbor

The Michigan Municipal League is a nonprofit association of municipalities and municipal leaders in the State of Michigan. The group banded in 1899 under the motto “Cooperation solves any problem” to reflect the organizers’ combined purposes: exchange of information, shared learning, development of unified policies on matters of municipal concern, and to form a collective voice on matters including home rule for local government.

The organization today remains the largest collective voice for municipalities in the State of Michigan, and represents the mutual interests of villages and cities of all sizes in its advocacy activities at the state and federal level.

== History ==
In August 1898, the city of Saginaw sent its mayor, William B. Baum Sr., to a meeting in Detroit of the National Municipal League, which had been formed in 1894 in Philadelphia as a citizens’ group aimed at finding ways to achieve good city government. The National Municipal League was later renamed the National Civic League and is today known as the National League of Cities, the oldest and largest organization in the United States focused on advocating for municipalities.

Inspired by the conference, Baum wrote to the mayors of 50 Michigan cities but only heard back from 15 so he decided there was not enough support at the time to pursue the idea further. Then in January 1899, Grand Rapids Mayor George H. Perry wrote to Baum to enlist his support in calling for a meeting of Michigan mayors to champion the principle of home rule. An invitation from Perry, Baum, Jackson mayor M.G. Laenecker and Detroit Mayor William Maybury was sent to every Michigan mayor for a meeting held in Lansing on May 23, 1899, where a constitution was drafted and temporary officers were elected.

Mayor Baum became the first president of the new group. Traverse City Mayor Frank Hamilton was the first vice president. Adrian Mayor Willard Stearns was treasurer and Grand Rapids Mayor Frances Hunter was secretary. The mayors of Cadillac, Flint, Jackson, Kalamazoo and Port Huron were elected as directors. The group was responsible for organizing its first convention, held in Grand Rapids on September 26–27, 1899, where the League of Michigan Municipalities was officially formed with 44 founding municipalities.

The city and village officials were initially focused on resolving issues with the Michigan legislature. At that time, all cities were chartered directly by the legislature. In the words of Harold D. Smith, the first director of the League, “they were at the mercy of a body composed of members who had little or no experience in municipal affairs.” Their initial efforts were focused on securing home rule for cities and villages, or as Smith put it, “bringing impressively to the attention of a rural legislature the problems of growing cities in the state.”

Those activities were later reinforced by the creation of a League advocacy office in Lansing, the seat of state government in Michigan, where League staff act as registered lobbyists for cities and villages. The group also uses a variety of grass roots tactics to achieve political influence. The League held its first annual convention in 1899, hosted each year by alternating member communities. It later added an annual legislative conference that is always held in the state's capital.

While the League's activities are no longer focused solely on the legislature, local officials continue to collaborate for more than a century to represent and protect the interests of local government.

The League's current motto is “Better communities. Better Michigan.” Its stated mission is to serve as “the one clear voice for Michigan communities" and to aid them in creating desirable and unique places through legislative and judicial advocacy; to provide educational opportunities for elected and appointed officials; and to assist municipal leaders in administering community services. The mission statement concludes: "Our mission is that of a non-profit, but we act with the fervor of entrepreneurs to passionately push change for better communities and a better Michigan.”

The League also provides a variety of services to its member communities, including a risk management and liability pool, purchasing program, executive search services, a municipal litigation center, education and training. The Michigan Municipal League Foundation provides funding for the League's educational programs and related functions such as a Shared Services Initiative which provides monetary and advisory support for local governments seeking to explore options for public services collaboration. League projects include the center for 21st Century Communities, an effort to help local officials identify, develop and implement strategies that will strengthen a community's sense of place in order to attract and retain young and talented members of the world's increasingly mobile workforce.

== Organizational structure ==
The League is composed mainly of communities and individual elected officials and staff within those communities. These members in turn elect an 18-member board of trustees from within their ranks who each serve for a three-year term. The Board determines policy both within the organization itself and as a political entity interacting with state and federal government.

An executive director is appointed by the Board to have authority over the League's programming, policy development and member services. The executive director in turn oversees and delegates duties to a staff of paid professionals. The director also serves as the top public spokesperson for the League, along with the President of the board of trustees.

This is one of 49 state municipal leagues which cooperate with the National League of Cities, which is the oldest and largest organization in the United States with the mission to strengthen and promote cities as centers of opportunity, leadership and governance.

In Michigan, a parallel organization that acts with and on behalf of townships is the Michigan Township Association. Other parallel organizations serving different constituencies include Michigan Association of Counties.; Michigan Suburbs Alliance; and Michigan Chamber of Commerce.

== Publications ==
"""The Review""" is the Michigan Municipal League's official magazine. "It serves as a medium of exchange of ideas and information for the officials of Michigan cities and villages." Archived Issues are available.

== See also ==
- Local government in the United States
- United States Conference of Mayors
- List of micro-regional organizations
- List of state Municipal Leagues

== Published works ==
- Michigan Municipal League. Michigan Municipal Law and Practice (2nd ed.). Archived from the original on July 5, 2008.
- "Restoring Michigan Communities Building by Building Better Communities. Better Michigan" (PDF). Michigan Municipal Review Published. Michigan Municipal League. September 2007. Archived from the original (PDF) on January 1, 2011.
