= North Dakota League of Cities =

The North Dakota League of Cities was founded in Grand Forks, North Dakota, in 1912. It represents the interests of cities and park districts in North Dakota in state and federal public policy discussions. It is now located in Bismarck, North Dakota.

== See also ==
- List of state Municipal Leagues
