= Big Seven (United States) =

Group of US non-profit organizations

The Big Seven is a group of non-partisan, non-profit organizations whose members include United States state and local government officials:

- Council of State Governments
- International City/County Management Association
- National Association of Counties
- National Conference of State Legislatures
- National Governors Association
- National League of Cities
- United States Conference of Mayors

These groups are influential in national government, often lobbying Congress to represent their members' interests.
