= Philadelphia blunt ban =

Philadelphia Bill No. 060345

Philadelphia City Council
- Citation: Phila. Bill No. 060345
- Enacted by: Philadelphia City Council
- Enacted: May 12, 2006
- Signed: January 23, 2007
- Commenced: January 23, 2007
- Introduced by: Councilman Brian J. O'Neill

Philadelphia Bill No. 060345, colloquially known as the Philadelphia blunt ban, was an ordinance in Philadelphia, Pennsylvania which banned the retail sale of cigarettes or cigars sold one or two at a time, rolling papers, flavored tobacco products, and drug consumption and packaging paraphernalia such as water pipes, roach clips, and bongs. It was an amendment to Chapter 9-600, the "Service Businesses" section, of the Philadelphia Code. It has since been overturned by court decree.

== Passage ==
The ban was the result of a campaign by Philadelphia police officer and community activist Jerry Rocks, Sr. Rocks's campaign, begun in October 2005, sought to restrict or prohibit convenience stores from selling the types of items eventually covered by the ordinance. Rocks targeted his campaign particularly at Sunoco and Wawa Food Markets.

Councilman Brian J. O'Neill sponsored the bill, introducing it into the Philadelphia City Council in May 2006. It was passed unanimously by the Council and signed into law by Philadelphia Mayor John F. Street on January 23, 2007, with immediate effect.

== Invalidation ==
In 2008, the Commonwealth Court held that the ban was partially preempted by the Controlled Substance, Drug, Device and Cosmetic Act, 35 Pa. Stat. Ann. §§ 780-101-780-144. On January 19, 2011, in Holt's Cigar Co. v. Solvibile, the Supreme Court of Pennsylvania reversed the Commonwealth Court's decision in part, holding that the entirety of the ban was preempted by the Controlled Substance Act.
