= Brian J. O'Neill =

American politician (born 1949)

Brian O'Neill
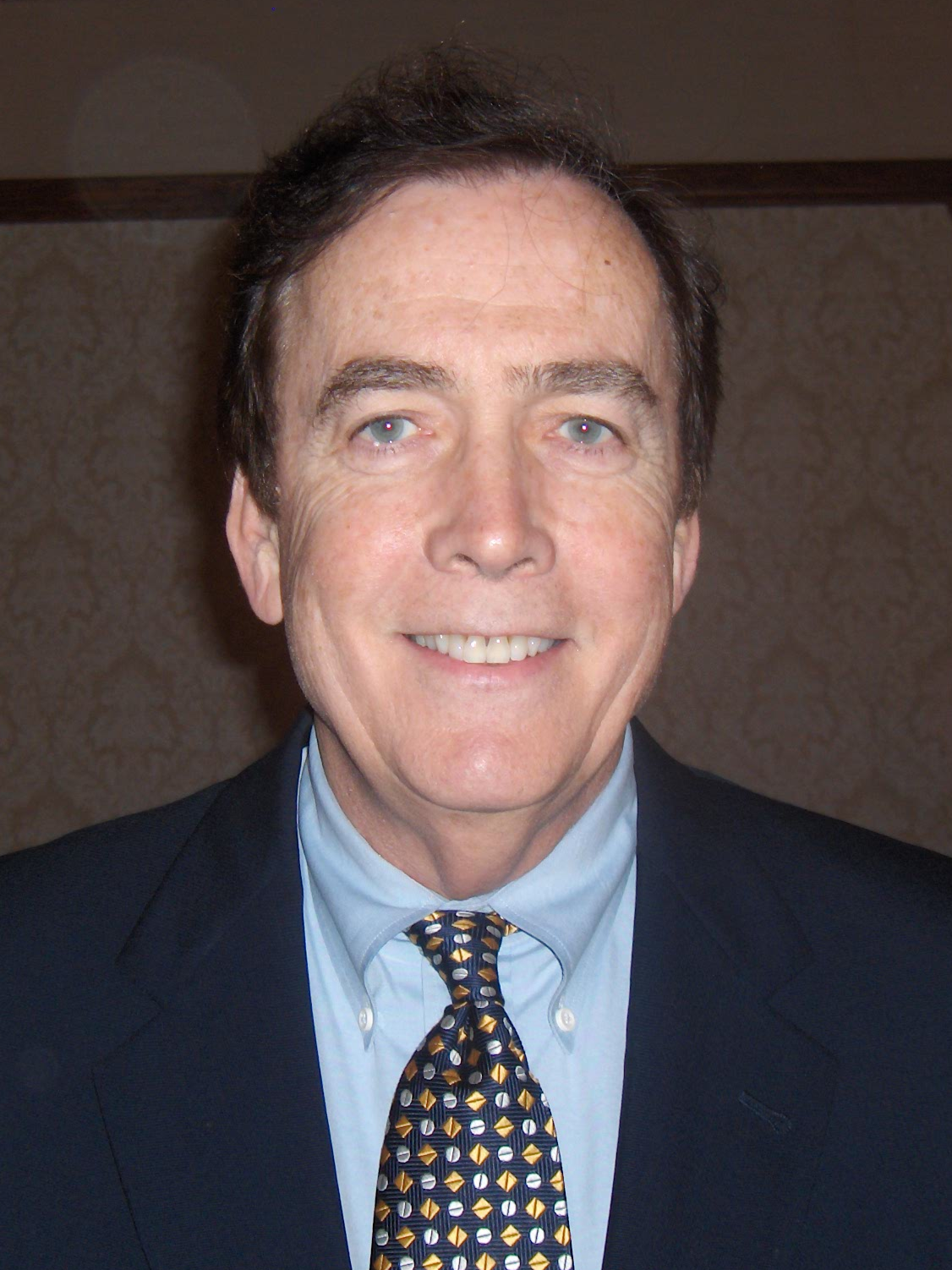

Member of the Philadelphia City Council from the 10th district
- Incumbent
- Assumed office January 7, 1980
- Preceded by: Melvin Greenberg

72nd President of the National League of Cities
- In office 1998
- Preceded by: Mark Schwartz
- Succeeded by: Clarence E. Anthony

Personal details
- Born: December 23, 1949 (age 76) Philadelphia, Pennsylvania, U.S.
- Party: Republican
- Education: Saint Joseph's University; Widener University School of Law

Brian J. O'Neill (born December 23, 1949) is a Republican Councilman representing the Tenth District on the City Council of Philadelphia, Pennsylvania. He has served since 1980.

== Biography ==
=== Early life ===
Brian J. O’Neill was born in Philadelphia, the son of a city police officer. He attended Saint Joseph's University graduating in 1971, and the Widener University School of Law, graduating there in 1975. Prior to his election to the city council, O’Neill worked as a Juvenile Probation Officer, as a Law Clerk in the Court of Common Pleas, and also operated a private attorney practice.

=== Political career ===
O'Neill was first elected to Council in 1979, when he defeated incumbent Councilman Mel Greenberg on a campaign built on Greenberg's perceived apathy for the position. Additionally, he served as the President of the National League of Cities in 1998.

He introduced the Philadelphia blunt ban in May 2006, which was adopted and signed by the mayor.

He is a former city Council's Minority Leader. As of 2024, he is the only current Republican council member in Philadelphia, after Republicans lost the two at-large seats reserved by the City Charter for the minority party, to the Working Families Party.

== See also ==
- List of members of Philadelphia City Council since 1952
