= Robert G. Knight =

American politician (born 1941)

Mayor of Wichita, Kansas
- In office 1995–2003
- Preceded by: Elma Broadfoot
- Succeeded by: Carlos Mayans
- In office 1989–1992
- Preceded by: Sheldon Kamen
- Succeeded by: Frank M. Ojile
- In office 1987–1988
- Preceded by: Tony Casado
- Succeeded by: Sheldon Kamen
- In office 1984–1985
- Preceded by: Margalee Wright
- Succeeded by: Kathlien Robertson Edmiston (honorary); Robert C. Brown (elected)
- In office 1980–1981
- Preceded by: Tony Casado
- Succeeded by: Robert C. Brown

74th National League of Cities
- In office 2000
- Preceded by: Clarence E. Anthony
- Succeeded by: Dennis Archer

Personal details
- Born: July 31, 1941 (age 85)

Robert G. "Bob" Knight (born July 31, 1941) is an American former politician who served several stints as a Republican mayor of Wichita, Kansas, for seven terms. He first ran for office, Wichita City Council, in 1979. He also served under Democratic Governor Joan Finney as Kansas Secretary of Commerce and Housing. He is generally known as "Bob Knight".

Knight served as president of the National League of Cities in 2000.
