= Kay Granger =

American politician (1943–2026)

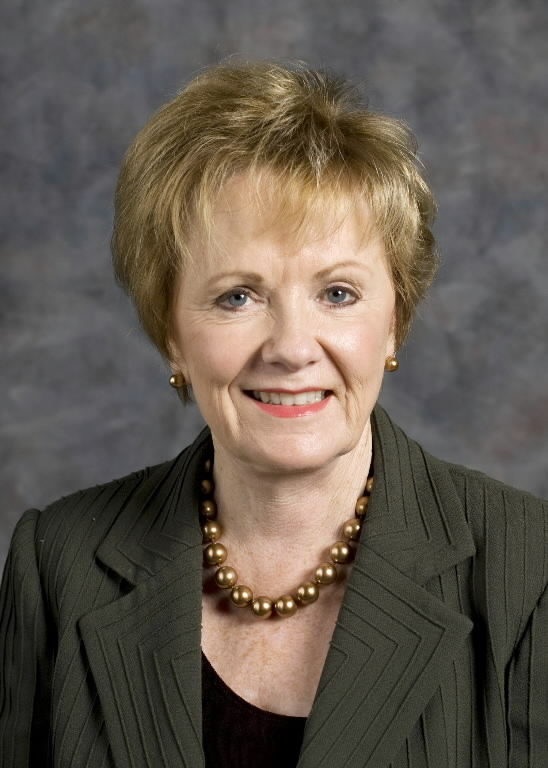
- Official portrait, c. 2012

Chair of the House Appropriations Committee
- In office January 3, 2023 – April 10, 2024
- Preceded by: Rosa DeLauro
- Succeeded by: Tom Cole

Ranking Member of the House Appropriations Committee
- In office January 3, 2019 – January 3, 2023
- Preceded by: Nita Lowey
- Succeeded by: Rosa DeLauro

Vice Chair of the House Republican Conference
- In office January 3, 2007 – January 3, 2009
- Leader: John Boehner
- Preceded by: Jack Kingston
- Succeeded by: Cathy McMorris Rodgers

Member of the U.S. House of Representatives from Texas's 12th district
- In office January 3, 1997 – January 3, 2025
- Preceded by: Pete Geren
- Succeeded by: Craig Goldman

41st Mayor of Fort Worth
- In office May 21, 1991 – December 19, 1995
- Preceded by: Bob Bolen
- Succeeded by: Jewell Woods (acting)

Personal details
- Born: Norvell Kay Mullendore; January 18, 1943 Greenville, Texas, U.S.
- Died: August 2, 2026 (aged 83) Fort Worth, Texas, U.S.
- Party: Republican
- Spouse: John Granger III (m. 1964; div. 1978)
- Children: 3
- Education: Texas Wesleyan University (BA)
- Granger's voice Granger supporting the Bipartisan Budget Act of 2019. Recorded July 25, 2019

Norvell Kay Granger (née Mullendore; January 18, 1943 – August 2, 2026) was an American politician who served as the U.S. representative for Texas's 12th congressional district from 1997 to 2025. A Republican, Granger chaired the House Committee on Appropriations from 2023 to 2024.

A onetime teacher and businesswoman, Granger served on the zoning commission of Fort Worth and on the Fort Worth City Council. She was elected as the first female mayor of Fort Worth in 1991 and served in that capacity until 1995. Granger was first elected to the U.S. House of Representatives in 1996. She was the first Republican woman elected to represent Texas in the U.S. House of Representatives and the first Republican woman to chair the House Committee on Appropriations.

Granger did not seek reelection in 2024. Following several months of absence from the Capitol, she was confirmed in December 2024 to have been residing in a senior living facility in Fort Worth since July 2024.

== Early life ==
Granger was born Norvell Kay Mullendore in Greenville, Texas, on January 18, 1943. She graduated from Eastern Hills High School in 1961 and from Texas Wesleyan University in 1965. Granger's mother was a teacher. Alliene Mullendore Elementary School in the Birdville School District is named in her mother's honor.

Before business and politics, Granger was a journalism and English teacher at Richland High School in the Birdville School District. Granger then became an insurance agent with her own business.

== Local politics ==
When the construction of a liquid waste disposal plant was proposed near her home, where she lived as a single mother to three children, Granger successfully spurred 40 people to show up at the City Council hearing to oppose the zoning change. Her position prevailed, leading to her appointment to the Fort Worth Zoning Commission. Granger briefly filed to run in the Democratic primary for the Texas State Senate, but withdrew and instead successfully ran for a seat on the Fort Worth City Council. She served on the zoning commission of Fort Worth from 1981 to 1989 and on the Fort Worth City Council from 1989 to 1991.

=== Mayor of Fort Worth ===
In 1991, Granger was elected as the first female mayor of Fort Worth, serving in that capacity until 1995.

Queen Elizabeth II visited Dallas on May 21, 1991, the same day that Granger was sworn in as Mayor of Fort Worth. Granger joined Dallas Mayor Annette Strauss at events welcoming the Queen and encouraged the Queen to visit Fort Worth on her next trip.

== U.S. House of Representatives ==
=== Elections ===
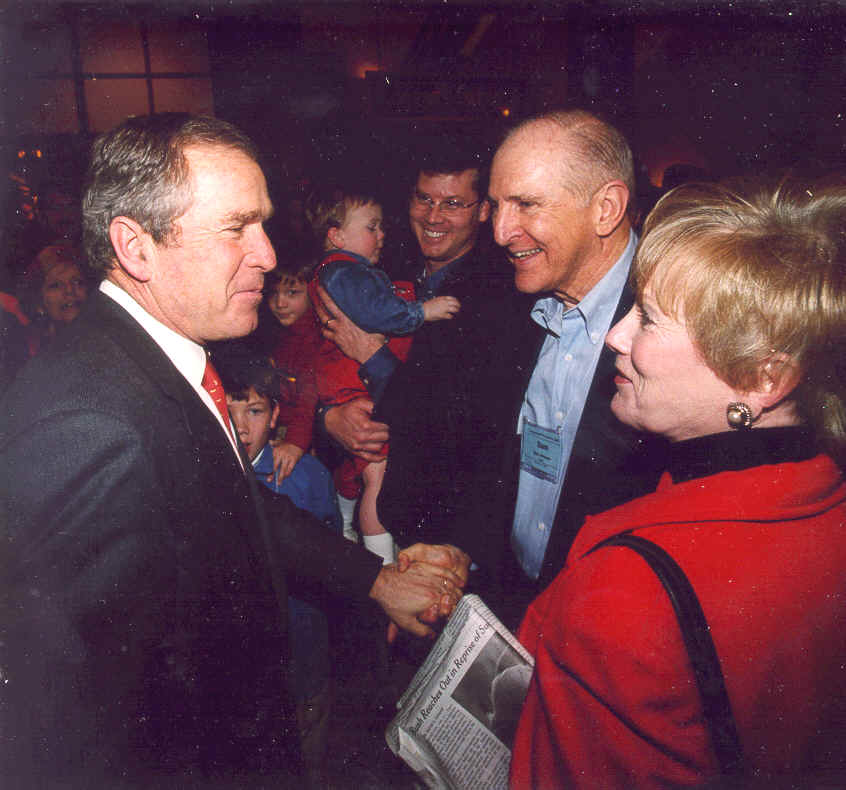
Granger, George W. Bush, and Sam Johnson

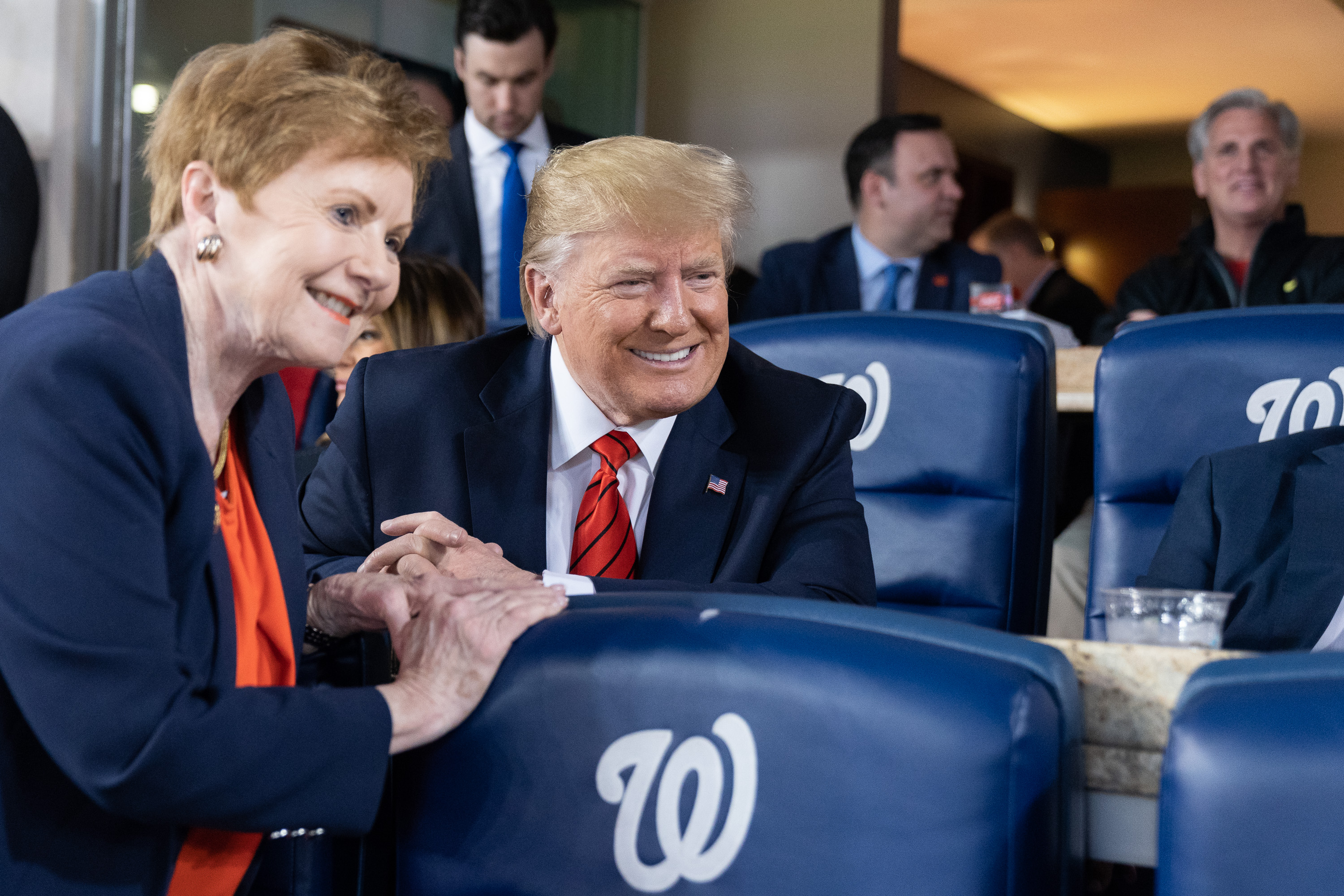
Granger with President Donald Trump at Game 5 of the 2019 World Series

Granger was first elected to the U.S. Congress in 1996. She was a Republican. After U.S. Representative Pete Geren announced he would retire in 1996, both the Democratic and Republican parties worked to recruit Granger to run for his seat. Granger represented Texas's 12th congressional district from 1997 to 2025.

In 2020, Granger received the endorsement of President Donald Trump for her re-election campaign.

=== Tenure ===
Granger was elected Conference Vice Chair, the fourth-ranking position among House Republicans, in 2006. She served as chair of the House Appropriations Subcommittee on State-Foreign Operations. She also sat on the United States House Committee on Appropriations' Subcommittee on Defense (she was the first woman to do so) and the Labor, Health, Human Services, and Education Subcommittee. Granger also served as a House Chief Deputy Whip.

Granger sponsored a bill to give the Congressional Gold Medal to the Monuments Men from World War II. These were individuals who worked to identify and preserve art and cultural artifacts from destruction during World War II. This bill became law and the Congressional Gold Medals were awarded to the living Monuments Men in October 2015.

After being diagnosed with COVID-19, Granger was not present at Trump's second impeachment on January 13, 2021. Despite being one of four Republicans who did not vote on the impeachment, Granger stated that she opposed Trump's impeachment.

Granger was a member of the House Appropriations Committee for 25 years. She served as the ranking member of the Committee. After the Republican Party gained a majority in the House of Representatives in the 2022 elections, she was named chair of the Committee in January 2023. Granger was the first woman to chair the House Appropriations Committee. She stepped down as the Appropriations Committee chair in April 2024.

==== Retirement ====
On October 30, 2023, Granger confirmed that she would not run for re-election in 2024. On March 22, 2024, she announced that she would step down as chair of the House Appropriations Committee as soon as the Republican Steering Committee chose her replacement; the Steering Committee did so on April 10. Granger's last recorded vote was on July 24, 2024. She was then absent from the Capitol until she returned to Washington in mid-November 2024 for a ceremony celebrating her work on the House Appropriations Committee.

In December 2024, media reports confirmed that Granger had been residing in a senior living facility in Fort Worth since July 2024; her son said she had "dementia issues". The incident sparked public backlash and renewed debate over the question of whether politicians of advanced age should continue holding elected office.

Republican Craig Goldman was elected to represent Texas's 12th congressional district on November 5, 2024.

=== Political positions ===
The Washington Post described Granger as socially centrist, but fiscally conservative. In 2013, the National Journal, a nonpartisan organization, gave Granger a composite political ideology score of 73% conservative and 27% liberal. According to FiveThirtyEight, as of February 2020, she voted with President Trump's position on legislative issues about 97% of the time. By October 2021, she was recorded as having voted with President Biden's position on legislative issues about 11% of the time.

==== Abortion ====
Granger supported abortion rights and Roe v. Wade until reversing her position in 2020. At that time, she asserted that she was anti-abortion and signed an amicus brief that asked the U.S. Supreme Court to overturn Roe.

Granger's abortion reversal was especially significant given the fact that her 1996 campaign had been promoted by The WISH List, a pro-abortion rights PAC. The WISH List had also supported her 2008 campaign. Granger had received mixed ratings from groups that support legal abortion. Prior to 2020, Granger had supported embryonic stem-cell research and voted against banning chemically induced abortions. As of 2013, she supported banning abortion after 20 weeks, but asserted that abortion was not her top issue. In 2017, she declined to co-sponsor a bill to ban abortion after six weeks. Granger voted for several spending bills that included funding for Planned Parenthood, including some introduced in 2018. In 2018, she also introduced legislation banning federal funding for abortion with exceptions for cases of rape, incest, or to save the life of the woman. In 2019, Granger signed a letter to President Trump urging him to "veto any appropriations bill that weakens current pro-life protections".

==== Other issues ====
Granger was known for her support for defense spending.

She voted several times in favor of an amendment to the United States Constitution to make it a crime to physically desecrate the American flag. She supported the Federal Marriage Amendment to define marriage as only permitted between a man and a woman, and also opposed letting same-sex couples adopt children. Granger was one of four Republicans in the House not to vote for or against repealing Don't Ask Don't Tell, though she had previously voted against other repeal proposals. In 2017, she said she had "no comment" in response to Trump's decision to ban transgender troops from the military. She did not vote either for or against legislation opposing the ban of transgender troops.

In June 2013, Granger was among the members of Congress to vote for an amendment to the National Defense Authorization Act for Fiscal Year 2014 to restrict the Pentagon from entering into new contracts with Russia's state arms broker, Rosoboronexport.

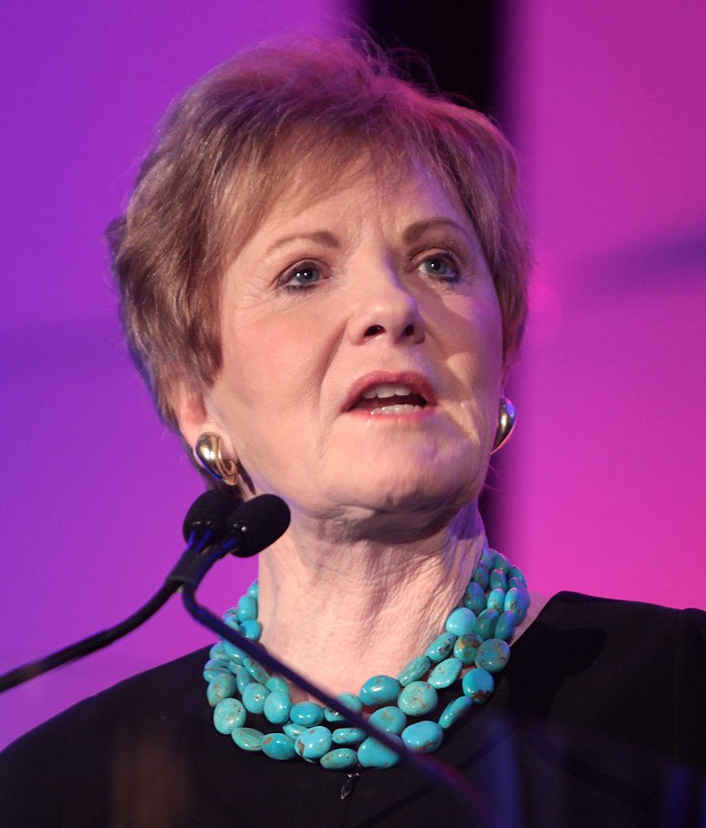
Granger speaking at the 2015 Lincoln Day Dinner

During her tenure, Granger supported more than $50 million in earmarks to infrastructure projects in Fort Worth that benefited the Trinity River Vision Authority, an organization led by her son.

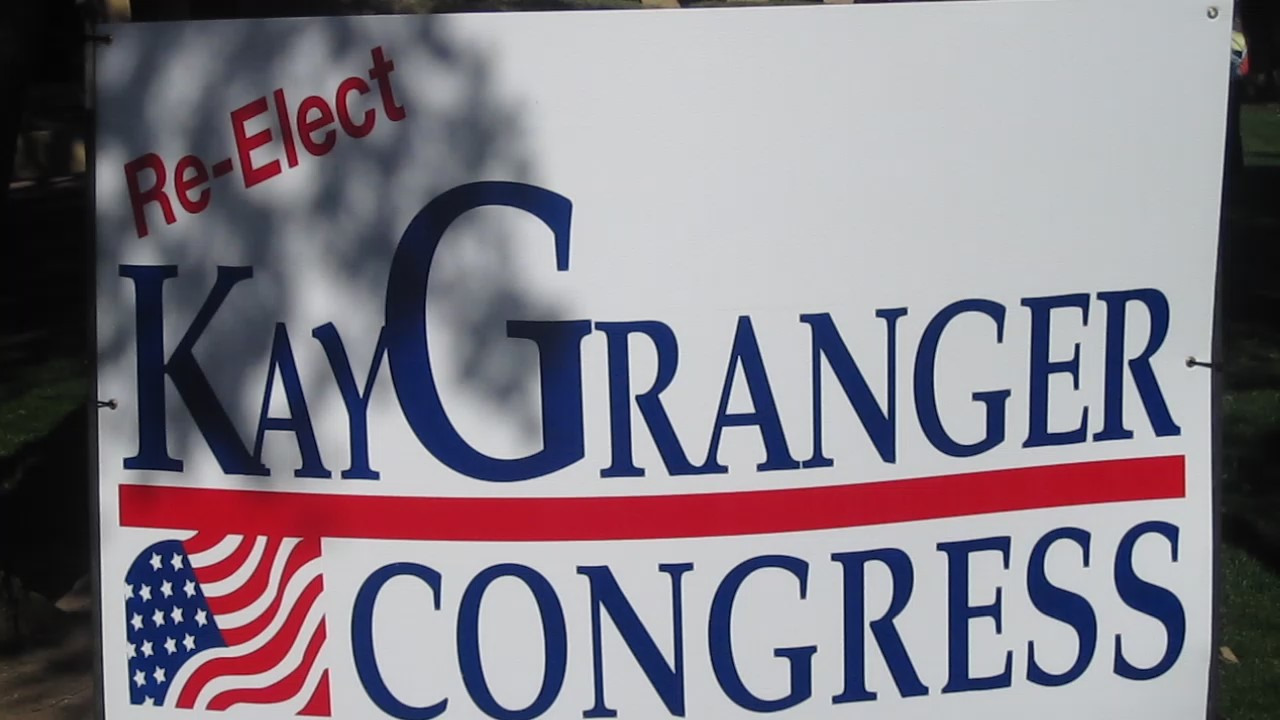
Kay Granger campaign sign in the Fort Worth Stockyards

Granger voted for a resolution supporting Israel following the October 7 attacks.

=== Presidential candidate endorsements ===
On September 25, 2007, Granger endorsed former Massachusetts governor Mitt Romney in the Republican U.S. presidential primaries. She became national co-chair of the campaign organization Women for Mitt, filling a vacancy left by the death of Washington State congresswoman Jennifer Dunn.

In 2015, Granger opposed Donald Trump's 2016 presidential candidacy, saying, "He definitely should not be considered to speak for our nation as our president." In 2020, however, she endorsed Trump and was endorsed by him.

=== Committee assignments ===
- Committee on Appropriations

=== Caucus memberships ===
- Anti-Terrorism Caucus (Co-Chair)
- United States Congressional International Conservation Caucus
- Iraqi Women's Caucus (Co-Chair)
- Sportsmen's Caucus
- Congressional Arts Caucus
- U.S.–Japan Caucus
- House Baltic Caucus
- Congressional NextGen 9-1-1 Caucus
- Republican Study Committee
- Congressional Caucus on Turkey and Turkish Americans
- Congressional Taiwan Caucus
- Congressional Community Health Centers Caucus

== Writing ==
In 2006, Granger published What's Right About America, Celebrating Our Nation's Values, a book reflecting on lessons from prominent figures of U.S. history.

== Personal life and death ==
Granger had three children and five grandchildren. She was married to John Granger III from 1964 until they divorced in 1978. She was a member of the United Methodist Church.

In December 2024, Granger was confirmed by The Dallas Morning News to have been residing in a senior living facility in Fort Worth since July 2024, concurrent with the final six months of her final term in the house. Her son said she had "dementia issues". The Dallas Express had received a tip about Granger's dementia in 2023 but could not confirm it for publication.

Granger died from complications of Alzheimer's disease at her home in Fort Worth on August 2, 2026, at the age of 83.

== Honors ==
- Kay Granger Elementary School, named in Granger's honor, opened in the Northwest Independent School District in August 2007.
- Kay Granger Park was named for Granger. It is a city park next to Mullendore Elementary School in North Richland Hills.
- In 1993, Granger's high school recognized her as a distinguished alumna.

== Electoral history ==
Texas's 12th congressional district: Results 1996–2022
Year	Democratic	Votes	Pct	Republican	Votes	Pct	Other	Party	Votes	Pct
1996	Hugh Parmer	69,859	41.04%	Kay Granger	98,349	57.78%	Heather Proffer	Natural Law	1,996	1.17%
1998	Tom Hall	39,084	36.28%	Kay Granger	66,740	61.94%	Paul Barthel	Libertarian	1,917	1.78%
2000	Mark Greene	67,612	35.98%	Kay Granger	117,739	62.66%	Ricky L. Clay	Independent	2,565	1.36%
2002				Kay Granger	121,208	91.87%	Edward A. Hanson	Libertarian	10,723	8.13%
2004	Felix Alvarado	66,316	27.68%	Kay Granger	173,222	72.32%				
2006	John R. Morris	45,676	31.09%	Kay Granger	98,371	66.95%	Gardner Osborne	Libertarian	2,888	1.97%
2008	Tracey Smith	82,250	30.60%	Kay Granger	181,662	67.59%	Shiloh Sidney Shambaugh	Libertarian	4,842	1.80%
2010	Tracey Smith	38,434	25.13%	Kay Granger	109,882	71.86%	Matthew Solodow	Libertarian	4,601	3.01%
2012	Dave Robinson	66,080	26.68%	Kay Granger	175,649	70.91%	Matthew Solodow	Libertarian	5,983	2.42%
2014	Mark Greene	41,757	26.31%	Kay Granger	113,186	71.31%	Ed Colliver	Libertarian	3,787	2.39%
2016	Bill Bradshaw	76,029	26.85%	Kay Granger	196,482	69.40%	Ed Colliver	Libertarian	10,604	3.75%
2018	Vanessa Adia	90,994	33.89%	Kay Granger	172,557	64.27%	Jacob Leddy	Libertarian	4,940	1.84%
2020	Lisa Welch	121,250	33.04%	Kay Granger	233,853	63.72%	Trey Holcomb	Libertarian	11,918	3.25%
2022	Trey Hunt	85,026	35.73%	Kay Granger	152,953	64.27%				

== See also ==
- Women in the United States House of Representatives

Political offices
Preceded by Bob Bolen	Mayor of Fort Worth; 1991–1995	Succeeded by Jewell Woods; Acting
U.S. House of Representatives
Preceded by Pete Geren	Member of the U.S. House of Representatives from Texas's 12th congressional district 1997–2025	Succeeded by Craig Goldman
Preceded by Nita Lowey	Ranking Member of the House Appropriations Committee; 2019–2023	Succeeded by Rosa DeLauro
Preceded by Rosa DeLauro	Chair of the House Appropriations Committee; 2023–2024	Succeeded by Tom Cole
Party political offices
Preceded by Jack Kingston	Vice Chair of the House Republican Conference; 2007–2009	Succeeded by Cathy McMorris Rodgers
