= Clarence E. Anthony =

American politician (born 1959)

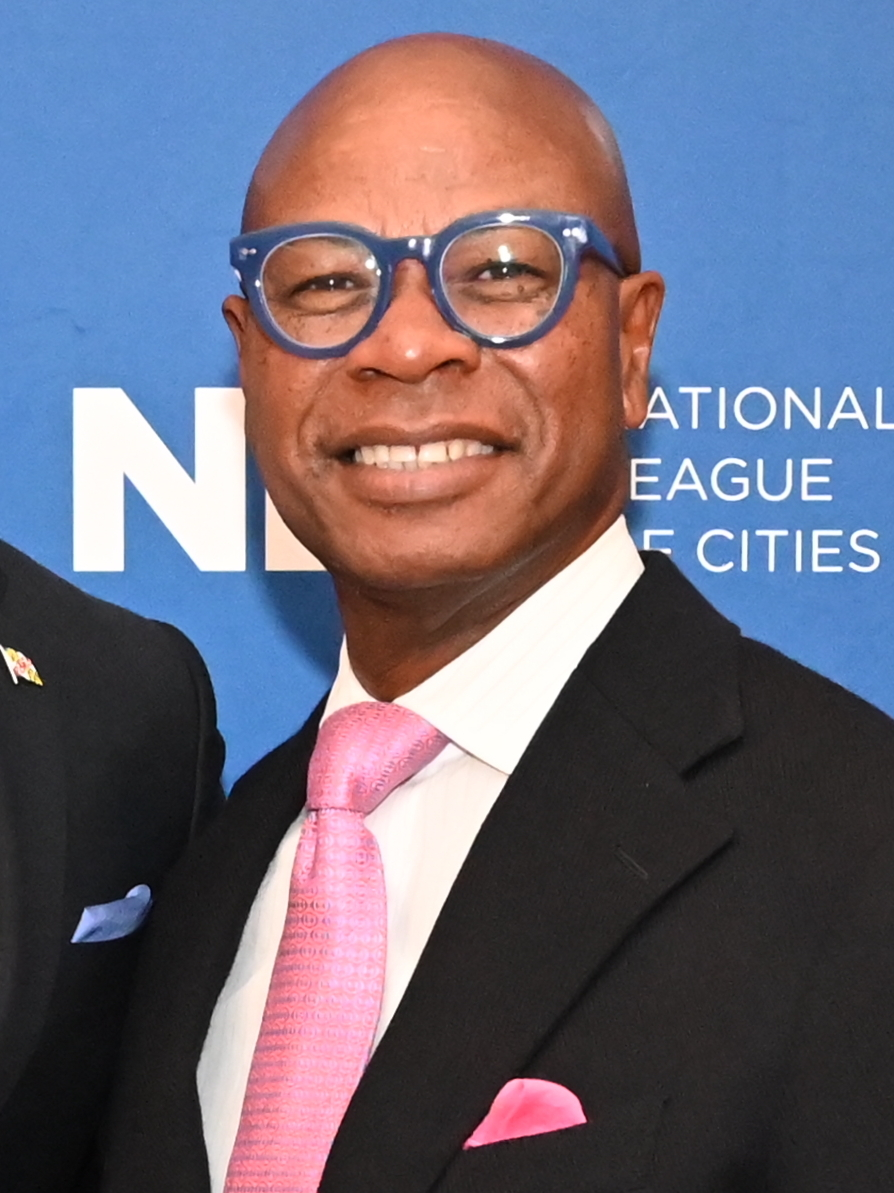
- Anthony in 2025

Executive Director of the National League of Cities
- Incumbent
- Assumed office 2013

Mayor of South Bay, Florida
- In office 1984–2008
- Preceded by: Don Tanner
- Succeeded by: Shirley Walker Turner

73rd President of the National League of Cities
- In office 1999
- Preceded by: Brian J. O'Neill
- Succeeded by: Robert G. Knight

Personal details
- Born: October 10, 1959 (age 67)
- Children: Reidel Anthony; Clarence Anthony Jr; Skylar Anthony

Clarence E. Anthony (born October 10, 1959) is an American politician. In 1984, he was elected as the mayor of South Bay, Florida when he was 24 years old, and served until 2008.

He previously worked as the Chief Marketing Officer for Tampa based engineering firm PBS&J Construction Services.

In 1999 he served as President of the National League of Cities (NLC) and in 2013 he was named as that organization's executive director. His total annual compensation from NLC is $1,205,493.

He was Treasurer of the United Cities and Local Governments organization (UCLG).

Anthony is a Fellow of the National Academy of Public Administration.

Anthony is a client of the All American Speakers Bureau.

His son, Reidel Anthony, played in the National Football League for five years as a wide receiver for the Tampa Bay Buccaneers. He also has a wife and daughter, Tammy and Skylar Anthony.

== Corporate Boards of Directors ==
Anthony has served on the Board of Directors for Bealls Inc. since 1999.

Anthony served on the PBS&J board of directors from 2004-2009. His time on the board overlapped with a $36 million embezzlement scandal led by CFO W. Scott DeLoach and two subordinates that stretched from 2000-2005. He was named the Presiding Director of the Board from 2008-2009, the company was later investigated for possible illegal activity in Qatar during this time.

Anthony serves on the Board of Directors for Build America Mutual since 2020, and currently serves as Chairman of the Board. Build America Mutual is also a paid partner of the National League of Cities where its products and services are endorsed and promoted to its members.

Anthony serves on the Board of Directos for Bearing Advisors since 2026. Bearing Advisors is also a paid partner of the National League of Cities where its products and services are endorsed and promoted to its members.

== Private Prison Investments ==
While mayor of South Bay, Florida, Geo Group opened the South Bay Correctional Facility in 1997. The following year, 1998, Anthony, along with Richard Wackenhunt and George Wackenhunt founded CentraCore Properties Trust (Correctional Properties Trust, CPT). Geo Group acquired CPT in 2007 for $356.1 million. CPT shareholders filed a class action lawsuit alledging the merger was an insider deal benefiting the CPT trustees and GEO executives.

Clarence E. Anthony was elected to the Geo Group board of directors in 2010.

Anthony Geo Group Compensation, SEC Form 14A
Filing Year	Director Pay	Stock	Total Compensation
2011	$96,000	-	-
2012	$171,000	123,500	$96,000
2013	$207,500	87,800	$342,642
2014	$192,586	87,200	$295,300
2015	$186,600	81,025	$279,786
2016	$187,750	129,450	$317,200
2017	$187,412	88,170	$275,582
2018	$181,000	218,573	$399,573
2019	$165,000	97,200	$262,200
Total	$1,574,848	912,468	$2,535,908

Anthony and the Geo Group Board of Directors were named as defendants in the prison condition lawsuit, Banet v. Geo Group Inc. et al.

Clarence E. Anthony resigned from the Geo Group Board of Directors on November 9, 2018, citing personal reasons.
