= Bob Bolen =

American politician and businessman (1926–2014)

Mayor of Fort Worth, Texas
- In office February 2, 1982 – May 21, 1991
- Preceded by: Woodie Woods; Richard Newkirk (interim)
- Succeeded by: Kay Granger

64th President of the National League of Cities
- In office 1990
- Preceded by: Terry Goddard
- Succeeded by: Sidney Barthelemy

Personal details
- Born: April 10, 1926 Chicago, Illinois
- Died: January 6, 2014 (aged 87) Fort Worth, Texas
- Spouse: Fran Bolen (1952-2014)
- Profession: Politician and businessman

Military service
- Allegiance: United States
- Branch/service: United States Navy
- Battles/wars: World War II

Robert Eugene "Bob" Bolen (April 10, 1926 – January 6, 2014) was an American politician and businessman who held office as the Mayor of Fort Worth, Texas, from 1982 to 1991. Bolen was Fort Worth longest-serving mayor in history. He has been credited with spearheading the creation of Fort Worth Alliance Airport, which opened in 1989. Mayor Bolen also successfully recruited the Bureau of Engraving and Printing, which opened the first currency production facility outside of Washington D.C. in Fort Worth during his tenure.

== Biography ==
=== Early life ===
Bolen was born in Chicago, Illinois, on April 10, 1926, as the eldest son of Milford Louis Bolen and Beatrice "Bee" Pinkerton Bolen. His father was a manager at McCrory Stores. The family moved more than twenty times when Bolen was a child due to his father's job transfers.

Bob Bolen initially enrolled at Texas A&M University, but left the school to enlist in the U.S. Navy during World War II. He served as a gunnery officer on board the USS Iowa (BB-61) during the war. Bolen returned to College Station, Texas after the end of the World War II, where he finished his bachelor's degree in business administration at Texas A&M in 1948. Later in life, Bolen was received an honorary doctorate of humanities from Texas Wesleyan University and honorary doctorates in public service from both University of North Texas and Texas Christian University.

He married his wife, the former Fran Ciborowski, in 1952 and the couple soon moved to Fort Worth, Texas. Fran Bolen died in 2021.

=== Business career ===
Bolen's first business was the Bolen Toy Palace, which opened in the Westcliff Shopping Center in Fort Worth. He later expanded that store into Bolen's Bike World. He also opened approximately twenty Hallmark Cards stores throughout the Dallas–Fort Worth metroplex and the San Antonio metropolitan area. In the 1980s, Bolen partnered with a group of businessman and investors to create Cornerstone Investments, firm specializing in mergers and acquisitions.

=== Political career ===
Bolen was first elected to the Fort Worth City Council in 1979. In 1982, Bolen won a special mayoral election to replace former Fort Worth Mayor Woodie Woods. He supported the redevelopment of downtown Fort Worth as mayor. He also spearheaded the creation of Fort Worth Alliance Airport, which has served as a major catalyst for growth in the region. Bolen successfully persuaded the Bureau of Engraving and Printing to open a currency production facility in Fort Worth. Under Bolen, Fort Worth established its first sister city relationship with Reggio Emilia, Italy. Two years later, Fort Worth established sister city links with Trier, Germany, and Nagaoka, Japan.

Bolen was elected to the board of directors of the National League of Cities in 1985. He also became the President of the Texas Municipal League in 1987. In 1990, Bolen became the President of the National League of Cities.

Bob Bolen retired as Mayor in 1991. He then became an advisor to the chancellor of Texas Christian University.

Bob Bolen died at his home in Fort Worth on the morning of January 6, 2014, at the age of 87. His funeral, which was attended by hundreds, was held at the First Presbyterian Church in downtown Fort Worth on January 11, 2014. He was survived by his wife, Fran Bolen; their daughter, Terrie Manning; two sons, Randy Bolen and Ron Bolen; and their foster son, Don Cosby.

Political offices
Preceded by Richard Newkirk	Mayor of Fort Worth, Texas; 1982–1991	Succeeded by Kay Granger
