= Don Hummel =

American businessman and politician

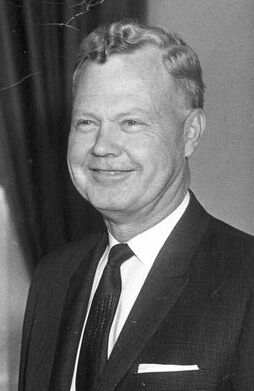

Mayor of Tucson, Arizona
- In office 1955–1961
- Preceded by: Fred Artemas Emery Jr.
- Succeeded by: Lewis Walter Davis

33rd President of the National League of Cities
- In office 1961
- Preceded by: Raymond Tucker
- Succeeded by: Richardson Dilworth

Personal details
- Born: September 8, 1907
- Died: August 18, 1988 (aged 80)
- Party: Democratic

Don Hummel (September 8, 1907 – August 18, 1988) was an American businessman and politician. Don Hummel served as the mayor of Tucson, Arizona from 1955 through 1961, where he is remembered for pushing an aggressive annexation program that helped encourage the city's rapid growth. He also served as Assistant Secretary of the United States Department of Housing and Urban Development during the administration of President Lyndon B. Johnson. In 1961, he served as president of the National League of Cities.

Hummel was also a concessionaire for the National Park Service, owning and operating hotels, guest cabins and other visitor services in Glacier National Park, Lassen Volcanic National Park, and Mount McKinley National Park.

He was the author of two published books, Stealing the National Parks (1987) and One Man's Life (1988).
