= New Jersey State League of Municipalities =

Organization of municipalities in New Jersey

The New Jersey State League of Municipalities is a voluntary association created by a New Jersey statute in 1915 to serve municipalities and local officials in the U.S. state of New Jersey. All 564 of New Jersey's municipalities are members of the League and all elected and appointed officials of member municipalities are entitled to the League's services. The organization is headquartered in the state capital of Trenton.

The League's Annual Conference, held each November in Atlantic City allows delegates the opportunity to participate in more than 100 panels, clinics, workshops, and other sessions. The 2004 Conference was attended by over 21,000 individuals, making it the largest municipal gathering in the country.

The organization grants awards to New Jersey mayors as part of its Mayors Hall of Fame, rcognizing 10 years, 20 years and 30 years of service. In 1999, an award for the Elected Officials Hall of Fame was initiated.

== See also ==
- List of municipalities in New Jersey
- List of micro-regional organizations
- List of state Municipal Leagues
