= International City/County Management Association =

Professional association for local government managers

International City/County Management Association (ICMA; originally called the International City Managers' Association) is an association representing professionals in local government management. It is based in Washington, D.C., USA.

ICMA provides education and networking opportunities for its members and offers the Credentialed Manager program to provide professional credentialing to city and county executive managers. It also conducts research, provides technical assistance and training, and promotes professional local government excellence.

ICMA's membership consists of more than 13,000 local government professionals worldwide. Members are given access to exclusive ICMA resources and support. It also hosts among the oldest local government conferences annually, each in a different city. The conferences serve as a hub of continued education for local government professionals.

ICMA is a member of the "Big Seven," a group of organizations that represent local and state government policy interests in the United States.

== History ==
ICMA was founded in 1914 as the City Managers' Association. Working with the National Civic League, Theodore Roosevelt, and others during the Progressive Era, the organization helped to professionalize local government and create reforms to reduce corruption. In 1924, the organization changed its name to the International City Managers' Association, and, in 1969, to the International City Management Association. As part of the 1969 change, ICMA began recognizing local governments that provide for positions of professional management while retaining a form of government other than council-manager. In May 1991, members voted to change the organizational name to the International City/County Management Association, in recognition of the growing number of county managers around the country who were being hired to run county governments.

In 1924, ICMA adopted its Code of Ethics, which governs all of its members. As a condition of membership, ICMA members agree to submit to a peer-to-peer review under established enforcement procedures should there be an allegation of unethical conduct. Members working for a local government in any capacity are required to follow all 12 Tenets of the Code. Members who are students, fully retired, working for a state or federal agency, or in the private sector are required to follow Tenets 1 and 3 of the Code. Failure to adhere to these guidelines can result in censure and removal of membership.

In 1972, ICMA, with the help of a Ford Foundation grant, created ICMA Retirement Corporation (ICMA-RC), an independent nonstock, nonprofit, financial services company that created a way to make city and county manager retirement assets portable between localities. In 2021, ICMA-RC rebranded to MissionSquare Retirement to better reflect its mission to support the retirement planning needs of all employees who dedicate their lives to serving their communities.

== Advocacy ==
Since its founding, ICMA has advocated the council-manager form of government and professional local government management as the best approach for ensuring community success. The council-manager form combines the political leadership of elected officials (in the form of council, board, or other governing body) with the professional experience of an appointed local government manager or administrator. Under this form, power is concentrated in the elected council, which hires a professional administrator to implement its policies. The administrator's authority is stipulated in the local government charter, and they are responsible for preparing the budget, directing day-to-day operations, hiring and firing personnel, and serving as the council's chief administrative officer.

A 2018 ICMA survey of municipal forms of government found that the council-manager form remains the most popular for medium- to large-sized jurisdictions, which are largely concentrated in the Southwest and Atlantic Coast states.

== Programming ==
The ICMA Voluntary Credentialing Program recognizes professional local government managers qualified by a combination of education and experience, adherence to high standards of integrity, and an assessed commitment to lifelong learning and professional development. Managers are recognized by ICMA through a peer review credentialing process. This self-directed program offers an opportunity for interested ICMA members to quantify the unique expertise they bring to their communities. The program also assists ICMA members in focusing and reflecting upon their lifelong professional development experience. Members who participate in the program may earn the designation of ICMA Credentialed Manager granted by the ICMA Executive Board.

ICMA offers leadership and professional development training and fellowships across the world. It also has global programs to help build local capacity to meet economic, environmental, social, and public safety challenges, funded through a variety of federal agencies like USAID, Homeland Security, the Environmental Protection Agency, among others.

In 2022, ICMA announced a new initiative aimed at strengthening local government management practices through a global learning approach. In collaboration with its partners and members throughout the world, ICMA will develop new programs, launch new services, and conduct new research in order to advance effective local government management practices throughout the world.

== Publications ==
ICMA publishes original research on a variety of topics, including cybersecurity, innovation, and smart cities. In addition, ICMA publishes a variety of print and digital products for local government professionals, including its award-winning monthly Public Management (or "PM") magazine.
