= Oral Health Foundation =

UK health charity

- Formation: 1971
- Legal status: Non-profit company and registered charity
- Purpose: Oral health promotion and education
- Headquarters: Rugby
- Region served: United Kingdom
- Chief executive: Dr Nigel Carter OBE
- Website: www.dentalhealth.org
- Formerly called: British Dental Health Foundation (1971-2016)

The Oral Health Foundation (formerly known as the British Dental Health Foundation) was formed in 1971 and is one of the world's leading independent oral health charities (registered charity number 263198). It is headquartered in the United Kingdom and aims to help the public improve their oral health and hygiene through a range of activities run under the name of the Oral Health Foundation. The current president of the Oral Health Foundation is Mhari Coxon, and the CEO is Dr Nigel Carter OBE.
