= List of state Municipal Leagues =

This is a list of United States state Municipal Leagues.

The state of Hawaii does not hold a Municipal League, because there are no independent cities or municipalities.

== List of state Municipal Leagues ==
State	Municipal League	Located
Alaska	Alaska Municipal League	Juneau, AK
Alabama	Alabama League of Municipalities	Montgomery, AL
Arkansas	Arkansas Municipal League	Little Rock, AR
Arizona	League of Arizona Cities and Towns	Phoenix, AZ
California	League of California Cities	Sacramento, CA
Colorado	Colorado Municipal League	Denver, CO
Connecticut	Connecticut Conference of Municipalities	New Haven, CT
Delaware	Delaware League of Local Governments	Dover, DE
Florida	Florida League of Cities Inc	Tallahassee, FL
Georgia	Georgia Municipal Association	Atlanta, GA
Iowa	Iowa League of Cities	Des Moines, IA
Idaho	Association of Idaho Cities	Boise, ID
Illinois	Illinois Municipal League	Springfield, IL
Indiana	Accelerate Indiana Municipalities	Indianapolis, IN
Kansas	League of Kansas Municipalities	Topeka, KS
Kentucky	Kentucky League of Cities	Lexington, KY
Louisiana	Louisiana Municipal Association	Baton Rouge, LA
Massachusetts	Massachusetts Municipal	Boston, MA
Maryland	Maryland Municipal League	Annapolis, MD
Maine	Maine Municipal Association	Augusta, ME
Michigan	Michigan Municipal League	Ann Arbor, MI
Minnesota	League of Minnesota Cities	St. Paul, MN
Missouri	Missouri Municipal League	Jefferson City, MO
Mississippi	Mississippi Municipal League	Jackson, MS
Montana	Montana League of Cities and Towns	Helena, MT
North Carolina	North Carolina League of Municipalities	Raleigh, NC
North Dakota	North Dakota League of Cities	Bismarck, ND
Nebraska	League of Nebraska Municipalities	Lincoln, NE
New Hampshire	New Hampshire Municipal Association	Concord, NH
New Jersey	New Jersey State League of Municipalities	Trenton, NJ
New Mexico	New Mexico Municipal League	Santa Fe, NM
Nevada	Nevada League of Cities and Municipalities	Carson City, NV
New York	New York State Conference of Mayors and Municipal Officials	Albany, NY
Ohio	Ohio Municipal League	Columbus, OH
Oklahoma	Oklahoma Municipal League Inc	Oklahoma City, OK
Oregon	League of Oregon Cities	Salem, OR
Pennsylvania	Pennsylvania Municipal League	Harrisburg, PA
Rhode Island	Rhode Island League of Cities and Towns	Providence, RI
South Carolina	Municipal Association of South Carolina	Columbia, SC
South Dakota	South Dakota Municipal League	Fort Pierre, SD
Tennessee	Tennessee Municipal League	Nashville, TN
Texas	Texas Municipal League	Austin, TX
Utah	Utah League of Cities	Salt Lake City, UT
Virginia	Virginia Municipal League	Richmond, VA
Vermont	Vermont League of Cities and Towns	Montpelier, VT
Washington	Association of Washington Cities	Olympia, WA
Wisconsin	League of Wisconsin Municipalities	Madison, WI
West Virginia	West Virginia Municipal League	Charleston, WV
Wyoming	Wyoming Association of Municipalities	Cheyenne, WY

== See also ==
- National League of Cities
