= Council–manager government =

Form of local government

The council–manager government is a form of local government commonly used for municipalities and counties in the United States, in Ireland, in city, district, and regional councils in New Zealand, and in Canadian municipalities. In the council-manager government, an elected city council hires a manager to serve as chief executive. The city manager can be replaced by a simple majority at any time, making it similar to the parliamentary system of national government, but with the difference that the city manager is a professional administrator rather than a politician.

== Overview ==
The council-manager system is similar to the typical governance of a publicly traded corporation. Under the form, an elected governing body, usually called a city council, board of aldermen, or similar title, is responsible for legislative functions such as establishing policy, passing local ordinances, voting appropriations, and developing an overall vision, similar to a corporate board of directors. The city council is accountable to the citizens of the community they represent, who play a similar role to that of shareholders in a corporation. The council or commission appoints a city manager to oversee the administrative operations, implement its policies, and advise it. The manager position is similar to that of a corporate chief executive officer appointed by a board of directors. The position of "mayor" present in this type of legislative body is a largely ceremonial title, and may be selected by the council from among its members or elected as an at-large council member with no executive functions, similar to a non-executive chairperson in a corporation.

The International City/County Management Association (ICMA), a professional organization for city managers, has listed at least three defining characteristics that distinguish a true council–manager government:

- All governmental authority rests with the council or other elected body, except for certain executive or administrative duties that are assigned to the manager. However, the manager always is employed at the pleasure of the elected body.
- The manager is allocated their functions in codified form by the city charter or other law, not assigned them ad hoc by a mayor.
- The manager must be responsible to, hired by, and can be dismissed only by the entire council, not one individual, such as a mayor or chairperson.

As of 2019, it is used in 52.7% of American cities with populations over 10,000.

== History in the United States ==
The concept of the council–manager form of government was a product of a confluence of the prevailing modes of thought during the late 19th and early 20th centuries. Probably the foremost influence was the Progressive Movement; following along the thought lines of the movement, the municipal reformers of that time wanted to rid municipalities of the pervasive "political machine" form of government and the abuses of the spoils system. The thought was to have a politically impartial administrator or manager to carry out the administrative function.

Staunton, Virginia, is credited as the first American city to appoint a city manager, which it did in 1908. This appointment attracted attention to the fledgling profession and caught the eye of Richard S. Childs, who would become known as the "father" of the council–manager form of government. The first large city to adopt the council–manager form was Dayton, Ohio, in 1913. Ohio Progressives organizing for the city manager plan also prioritized proportional representation with adoption in Ashtabula, Cincinnati, Cleveland, Hamilton, and Toledo.

The council–manager form of government developed, at least in part, as a response to some perceived limitations of the city commission government form. Since it relies on candidates being elected at-large, minority populations are often unable to elect candidates of their choice. In addition, it may concentrate too much power in individual commissioners, who also manage city departments. The council–manager form became the preferred alternative for progressive reform. After World War I, few cities adopted the commission form and many cities using the commission plan switched to the council–manager form.

By 2001 there were 3,302 cities with a population over 2,500 and 371 counties using the council–manager system. Phoenix, Arizona, is the largest city in the United States to retain a council–manager government.

Since the turn of the 21st century, there have been studies about hybrid forms of local governments that take elements of both council–manager and mayor–council forms. The cities that have modified their organizational structure from one of the pure forms have been called "adaptive" forms.

== History in the Republic of Ireland ==
Following the turmoil of World War I (1914–1918), the 1916 rising, the Irish War of Independence (1919–1921), and the Irish Civil War (1921–1923), the Irish government found it necessary to remove the members of several local authorities and replace them temporarily by paid commissioners.

Both Dublin and Cork city councils were so removed. In both cities, there was a body of opinion that the services provided by the councils were delivered more efficiently and fairly under the commissioners than under the previous system, where the executive function had been, in effect, vested in the councils and their committees.

In 1926, a committee of commercial and industrial interests in Cork came together to consider a scheme of city government. Having regard to the city's experience of commissioners and recent experience in the United States a council–manager plan of city government was proposed.

After discussion between the minister for local government and local representatives, the minister, Richard Mulcahy, introduced as a government measure, the Cork City Management Bill 1929 and it became law despite opposition. The minister proposed and the Oireachtas enacted similar provision for Dublin City in 1930. Similar laws were passed for Limerick in 1934 and Waterford in 1939 under the Fianna Fáil government.

Under the County Management Act 1940, which was brought into operation in August 1942, a county manager is the manager of every borough or town in that county, but since the 1990s, has the power to delegate these functions to any other officer of that borough or town council.

The system was modified also in subsequent legislation, particularly the City and County Management (Amendment) Act 1955, which made some adjustments to give greater power to the council members, and the Local Government Act 1985, which provided for the council–manager system in Galway City once detached for local government purposes from County Galway.

The above acts have been replaced since that time, in substantially the same form, by the Local Government Act 2001.

== History in Germany ==
The council-manager form of local government was originally introduced into the West German states of Lower Saxony and North Rhine-Westphalia by post-WWII legislation. It was abolished in the mid-1990s when changes to local government law resulted in the adoption of the mayor-council system. The equivalent German term for the position of city manager was Oberstadtdirektor.

== See also ==
- Mayor–council government

== Bibliography ==
- Svara, James H.; Nelson, Kimberly L. (2008). "Taking Stock of the Council-Manager Form at 100". Public Management. August 2008: 6–15.
