= A-dec =

American dental equipment manufacturer

A-dec, Incorporated
- Industry: Manufacturing
- Founded: 1966
- Headquarters: Newberg, Oregon, US; 45.3152°N 122.9534°W
- Key people: Ken and Joan Austin, Founders; Scott Parrish, CEO; Marv Nelson, President
- Products: Dental chairs, lights, cabinetry and sterilization
- Number of employees: 1500
- Website: A-dec.com

A-dec (Austin Dental Equipment Company) is a dental office furniture and equipment manufacturer based in Newberg, Oregon, United States. It is considered one of the largest dental equipment makers in the world, and as of 2002 is Newberg's largest employer with 832 employees. Founded in 1964, the company's annual revenue of $250 million comes from the sale of products such as dental chairs, stools, delivery systems, medical lighting, cabinetry, and other accessories.

== History ==
In 1964, Ken Austin built an improved air-powered vacuum system known as the Air-Venturi System, which varied from the belt-drive devices in use at the time. That same year the company released the first miniature delivery unit designed specifically for the new reclining patient chair, Dec-Et, followed by the complementary Tray-Cart, the first mobile dental assistant's work surface. The mobile equipment helped the company grow rapidly. In 1966, A-dec was incorporated, and at the time the company was housed in a Quonset hut in Newberg. They built a new plant and offices on 150 acres (0.61 km^{2}) on the edge of Newberg in 1971. The company expanded distribution into 23 countries that year as well.

In 1977, A-dec offered a full line of instrument delivery systems. In subsequent years, the company added chairs, stools and dental lights, becoming a full service provider in the 1980s with revenues of $75 million annually by 1990. They developed a dental cabinetry line in 1983 as well as building the self-contained water system, allowing dentists to have a controlled water supply to handpieces, and syringes, improving the industry's infection control. A-dec began a partnership with W&H, a family-run company based in Austria and a leading manufacturer of rotary dental instruments in 1985. The partnership positioned A-dec for new growth into the dental handpiece and ancillary equipment markets with the A-dec|W&H co-brand. In January 1990, they bought A-dec Diversified Inc., a company also in Newberg. The company grew to 600 employees by 1992. In 1999, the company was named as the 88th largest woman-owned company in the US.

A-dec introduced new products the Cascade and Radius in the 1990s, and in 2004 introduced the A-dec 500. The chair-mounted delivery system brought new technologies together for the first time and created an integrated system. The development of A-dec 500 led to streamlining the company's production lines and staging A-dec for a quicker time-to-market for its products. They also switched from a cold press to a hot press for their wood piece production at their 60,000-square-foot (5,600 m^{2}) plant. The company was one of the leading contributors to a campaign to force a vote on a proposed income tax increase by the state legislature in 2003, which was defeated in 2004.

By 2006 the company had grown to almost 1,000 employees and annual revenue of $250 million. A-dec named Scott Parrish president of the company in 2007, replacing founder Ken Austin. In 2008, the company held a contest for dentists and gave the winners new office equipment. They also opened a new 25,000-square-foot (2,300 m^{2}) training facility that year in Newberg. This facility doubles as a showroom for visiting dental professionals to view the company's products. The company introduced the A-dec 300, a fully integrated chair and delivery system with a smaller footprint in 2009. That year they also laid off 100 employees due to the worldwide economic downturn. In February of that year the company was fined by the Environmental Protection Agency and then reached a $325,700 settlement for selling an unregistered pesticide.

In 2024, A-dec announced the expansion of its business with the launch of the A-dec Certified Pre-Owned Equipment program. The company has developed a refurbishing process that includes a rigorous multi-point inspection to ensure the quality of its used dental equipment. A-dec's certified pre-owned equipment is sold in packages, with sales and installation managed by authorized A-dec dealers.

== Operations ==
Founders, George Kenneth 'Ken' Austin Jr. (1931–2019) and Joan D. Austin (1931–2013), developed the "A-dec Way", a written expression of the operating philosophy which governs all aspects of the company. Introduced in 1972, the philosophy contains 15 points from a concern for people to encouraging creativity among others. Employees receive profit sharing from the privately held corporation. The company's 40-acre (160,000 m^{2}) campus in northeast Newberg has 11 buildings with 500,000 square feet (46,000 m^{2}). As of 2003 the private company was debt free. Most of the equipment built is custom ordered by dentists.

The company has affiliations with the American Association of Women Dentists, American Dental Association, American Student Dental Association, Dental Trade Alliance, National Dental Association, British Dental Health Foundation, and Australian Dental Industry Association among others.

A-dec has won many award including being named as one of Oregon's Most Admired Companies by the Portland Business Journal in 2006, 2007 and 2008. Other awards include those from Dentaltown Magazine, Volunteers of America, the American Dental Education Association, Association of Fundraising Professionals, American Dental Association, and Oregon Business magazine.

== See also ==
- List of companies based in Oregon
