= Benton Hall =

Benton Hall may refer to:

- Benton Jay Hall (1835–1894), U.S. Representative from Iowa
- Benton Hall (Miami University)
- Benton Hall (Oregon State University)
