= Oregon State University =

Public university in Corvallis, Oregon, US

- Former name: See list
- Motto: "Out there"
- Type: Public research university
- Established: October 27, 1868; 158 years ago (official designated charter day)
- Accreditation: NWCCU
- Academic affiliations: HECC; ORAU; Land Grant; Sea Grant; Space Grant; Sun Grant
- Endowment: $1.01 billion (2025)
- Budget: $1.84 billion (2025)
- President: Jayathi Murthy
- Provost: Roy Haggerty
- Total staff: 4,700 (spring 2023)
- Students: 38,485 (fall 2025)
- Undergraduates: 31,586 (main campus), 1,087 (Cascades campus) (fall 2025)
- Postgraduates: 5,910 (main campus), 147 (Cascades campus) (fall 2025)
- Location: Corvallis, Oregon, United States; 44.5639°N 123.2747°W
- Campus: 560 acres (230 ha); Small city
- Other campuses: Bend; Portland; Newport
- Newspaper: The Daily Barometer
- Colors: Orange and black
- Nickname: Beavers
- Sporting affiliations: NCAA Division I FBS – Pac-12; MPSF; WCC
- Mascot: Benny Beaver
- Website: oregonstate.edu
- ASN: 4201

Oregon State University (OSU) is a public land-grant, research university in Corvallis, Oregon, United States. Over 32,000 undergraduate and 5,000 graduate students are enrolled. The university offers programs in more than 200 undergraduate disciplines, and over 100 at graduate and doctoral levels through all 11 colleges. OSU is classified by the Carnegie Foundation as an R1 Doctoral University, designating it with, "very high research spending and doctorate production". As of 2025, OSU is home to the fifth-largest engineering college in the nation.

In 2024, nearly 38,000 students were enrolled at OSU, making it the largest university in the state. Out-of-state students typically make up over one-quarter of the student body. Since its founding, over 272,000 students have graduated from OSU.

Initially chartered as a land-grant university, OSU became one of only four inaugural members of the National Sea Grant Program in 1971. Membership in the National Space Grant C&F Program came in 1991, followed by Sun Grant Association membership in 2003. OSU is also one of the top five doctoral university destinations in the nation for Fulbright Scholars (2022–2023).

== History ==
=== The 1800s ===
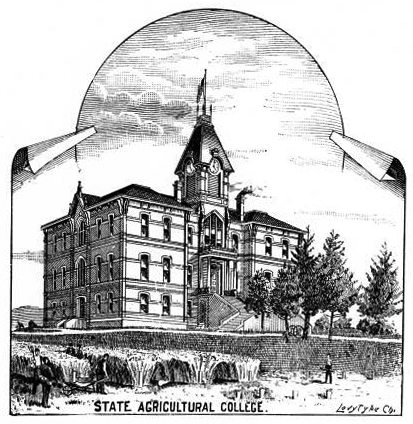
Benton Hall was constructed in 1889 and served as OSU's first administration building.

The university's roots date to 1856, when it was founded as a preparatory community school known as Corvallis Academy. Corvallis area Freemasons played a leading role in developing the academy. Several of the university's largest buildings are named after these founders today. The early academy is recognized as the first to offer a postsecondary public education in the Oregon Territory. The first administrator and teacher was John Wesley Johnson, a famous figure in Oregon higher education. Johnson received his secondary education in Corvallis and his undergraduate from Pacific University before managing the new academy. He later attended Yale University and became an instrumental figure in the development and administration of several other early Oregon colleges. Between 1860 and 1868, the Southern Methodist Church took ownership and operated the academy privately.

In 1865, William A. Finley was hired as president and expanded the curriculum to include upper-level courses. The growth in curriculum made OSU a magnet for many Northwest young adults seeking professions.

On August 22, 1868, the official articles of incorporation were filed for Oregon State University, known then as Corvallis College. To help ensure the state's sole public college would be well funded, the Oregon Legislative Assembly designated it Oregon's Land-grant university and the "agricultural college of the state of Oregon". Two months later, on October 27, 1868, OSU was chartered as the state's first and only public college. Finley remained in his post and is recognized as OSU's first president. Although OSU officially became a fully public, non-denominational institution in 1868, the Southern Methodist Church remained an important part of the school's administration through the mid-1880s. Up until the turn of the 20th century, the early college adopted seven name variations. As with many land-grant colleges, name changes were common during this period, and helped schools align with the largest federal grants in agricultural research. The Morrill Land-Grant Acts were pivotal in helping OSU and other early American land-grant universities survive and thrive during a time when traditional colleges and universities often faced financial hardship. "This dependable flow of funds provided the long-sought financial foundation the colleges needed and encouraged state governments to make annual appropriations as well."

Early names
Year	Name
1868	Corvallis College (Note: Unofficial name: 1868-1885)
1872	Corvallis State Agricultural College
1876	State Agricultural College
1881	Corvallis Agricultural College
1882	Corvallis College
1886	State Agricultural College of Oregon
1889	Oregon Agricultural College
1927	Oregon State Agricultural College
1937	Oregon State College
1961	Oregon State University

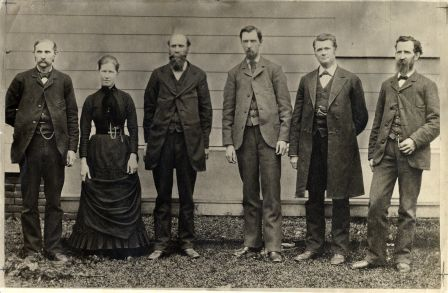
Faculty in 1883 (Left to Right): E. E. Grimm, Professor of Agriculture; Ida Callahan, Assistant Professor of English; B. L. Arnold, President; B. J. Hawthorn, Professor of Languages; Joseph Emery, Professor of math and natural sciences; W. W. Briston, accounting instructor.

Acceptance of the federal grant required the college to comply with many new requirements. The school was then authorized to grant Bachelor of Arts, Bachelor of Science and Master of Arts degrees. OSU's land-grant designation did not go without contention. In its early development, the cash-strapped founders of the University of Oregon asked the state to designate their planned institution Oregon's land-grant university, but the request was denied. The first graduates received a Bachelor of Arts degree in 1870. Within two years, the school was renamed Corvallis State Agricultural College. As the school's name changed, so did its mission. Science and technology coursework became the most popular majors starting in 1900.

=== The 1900s ===
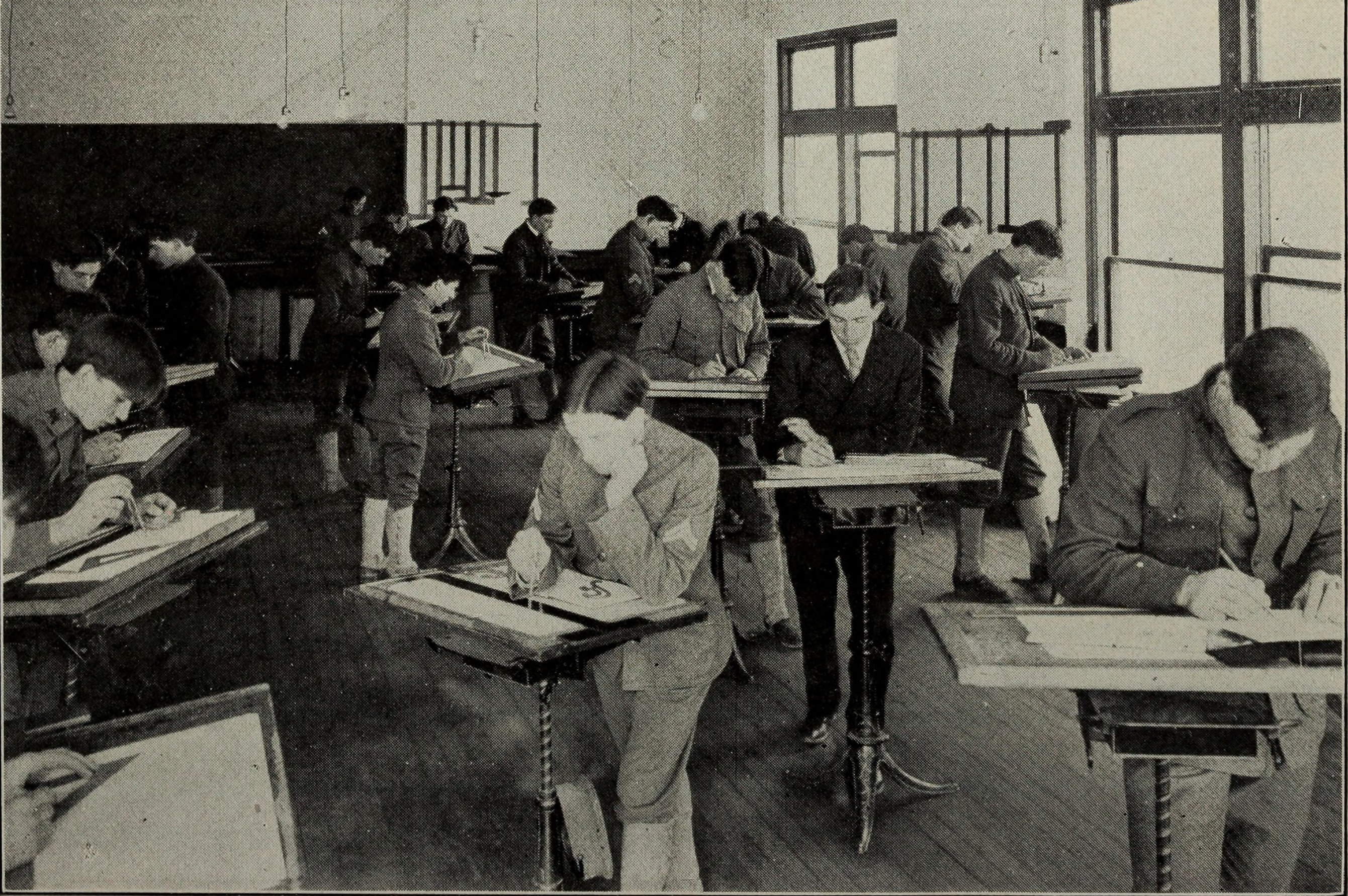
Engineering students taking a class in analytical geometry. (1904)

In 1914, the Oregon State Board of Higher Education, known then as the State Board of Higher Curricula, began assigning specific colleges to Oregon State University and the University of Oregon in an effort to eliminate duplication. "...the board confined studies in engineering and commerce to the Corvallis campus and major work in the liberal arts and related subjects to the University of Oregon in Eugene. This was the first in a series of actions to make the curricula of the two schools separate and distinct."

In 1927, the school's name was officially changed from Oregon Agricultural College to Oregon State Agricultural College (OSAC).

In 1929, the legislative assembly passed the Oregon Unification Bill, which placed Oregon's public colleges under greater oversight of the newly renamed Oregon State Board of Higher Education. A doctorate in education was first offered in the early 1930s, with the conferral of four Doctor of Philosophy degrees in 1935. That year also saw the creation of the first summer session. The growing diversity in degrees offered by the college led leaders to adopt the name "Oregon State College" in 1937.

The name Oregon State University was adopted on March 6, 1961, by a legislative act signed into law by Governor Mark Hatfield.

== Campuses and educational outlets ==
=== Main campus (Corvallis) ===
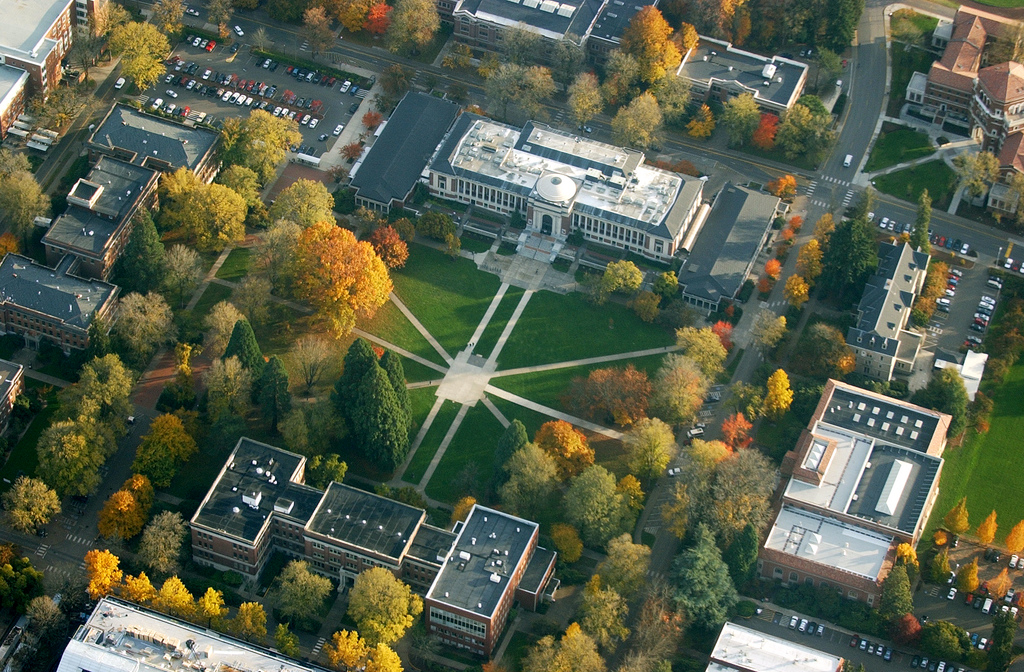
Aerial view of Memorial Union Quad

The 420-acre (170 ha), tree-lined main campus serves as an internationally recognized arboretum and the centerpiece of Corvallis, Oregon. The campus is 83 miles south of Portland, near the middle of the state's Willamette Valley. Much of the main campus was designed by landscape architect John Charles Olmsted in 1906. In 2008, Olmsted's early campus design was designated by the National Register of Historic Places as the Oregon State University Historic District. It is the only college or university campus in Oregon to hold a historic district designation. The Memorial Union was designed by OSU alum and renowned Oregon architect, Lee Arden Thomas. It has been recognized as "one of the finest examples of neoclassical architecture in Oregon."

=== OSU-Cascades (Bend) ===
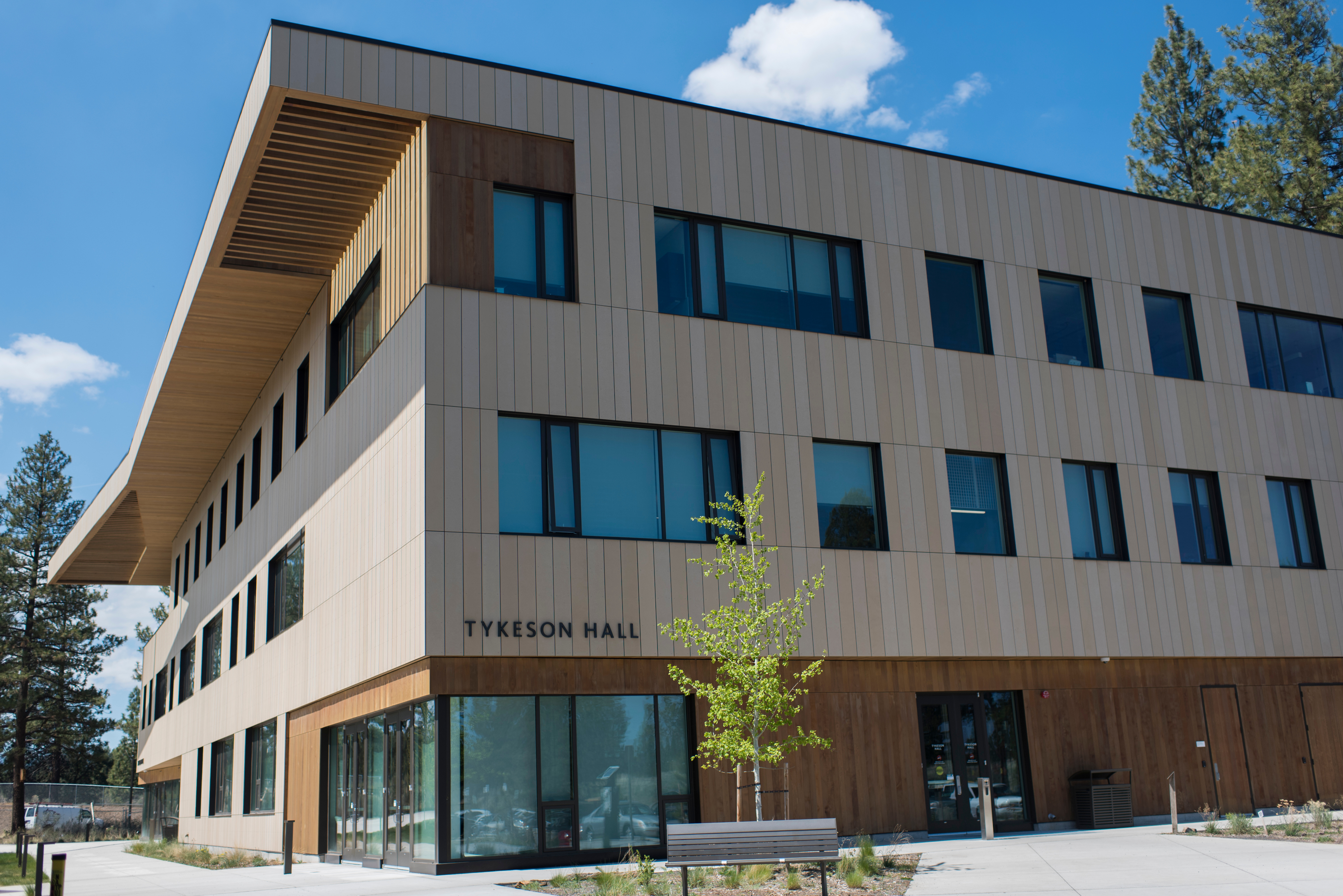
Tykeson Hall at OSU-Cascades. (Photo by Hannah O'Leary)

In 2016 OSU completed the construction of a 10-acre branch campus in Bend. This campus is called OSU-Cascades and offers students living in Oregon's central region an opportunity to attend select classes closer to their homes.

As of 2023, the branch campus stretches across 30 acres in southwest Bend, with options to grow into 90 more acres of OSU-owned land nearby. The latest goal is to attract around 5,000 students per year within the next decade. As of 2023, enrollment was around 1,400 students.

=== Ecampus (online) ===
Oregon State offers more than 80 degree and certificate programs made up from a selection of over 1,500 online courses in more than 110 subjects. U.S. News & World Report ranks OSU's online Ecampus fourth nationally (2024). The Ecampus has held a top-10-ranking since 2015. In 2021 College Choice ranked the Ecampus college of liberal arts program the best in the nation. The same faculty teaching on campus also teach many of their programs and courses online through the Ecampus website. Students who pursue an online education at Oregon State earn the same diploma and transcript as on-campus students.

=== OSU Portland Center (Downtown Portland) ===
In 2017, Oregon State University's Portland headquarters were relocated to the newly renovated Meier & Frank building. The historic building features modern offices, classrooms and meeting spaces; which fill the entire second floor of what is now known as the Portland Building.

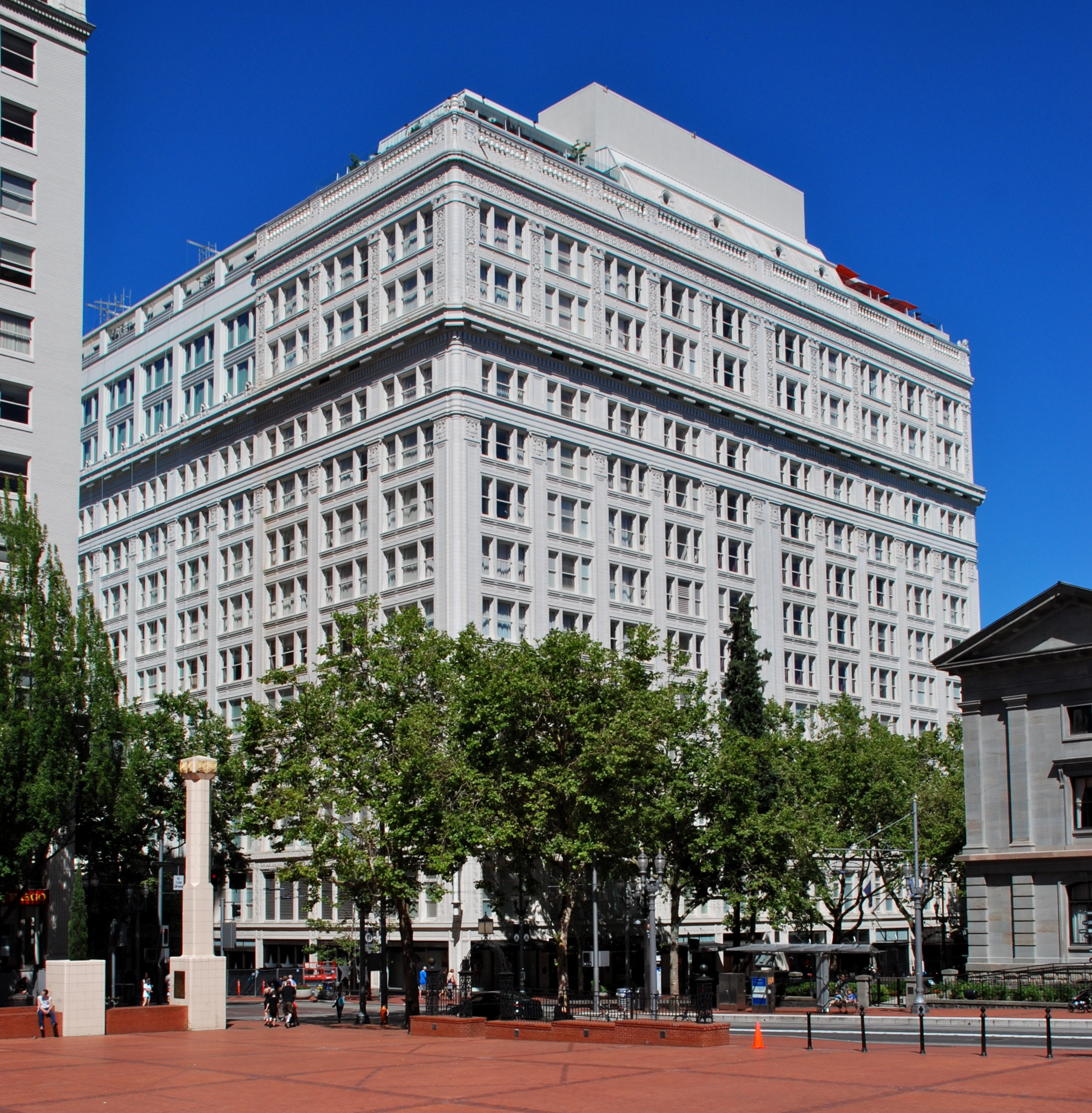
The historic Portland Building located downtown.

Located next to downtown Portland's Pioneer Square, the OSU Portland Center accommodates offices for the OSU Extension Service, the OSU Foundation, the OSU Alumni Association, and the OSU Athletics Department. The downtown building provides the university with a more central location, in the state's largest city, to maintain a base of operations. Aside from offices, the second floor also provides classroom space for teaching, research and meeting space for outreach engagement. Its use is similar to the work at OSU's other campuses in Corvallis and Bend. Executives and university scientists working on major initiatives, such as the Marine Studies Initiative, use the space for lectures and international conferences.

The OSU Portland Center is also an important part of the OSU Advantage partnership. The partnership brings members of private industry, from throughout the world, to Portland to discuss proposed commercialization initiatives.

=== Hatfield Marine Science Center (Newport) ===
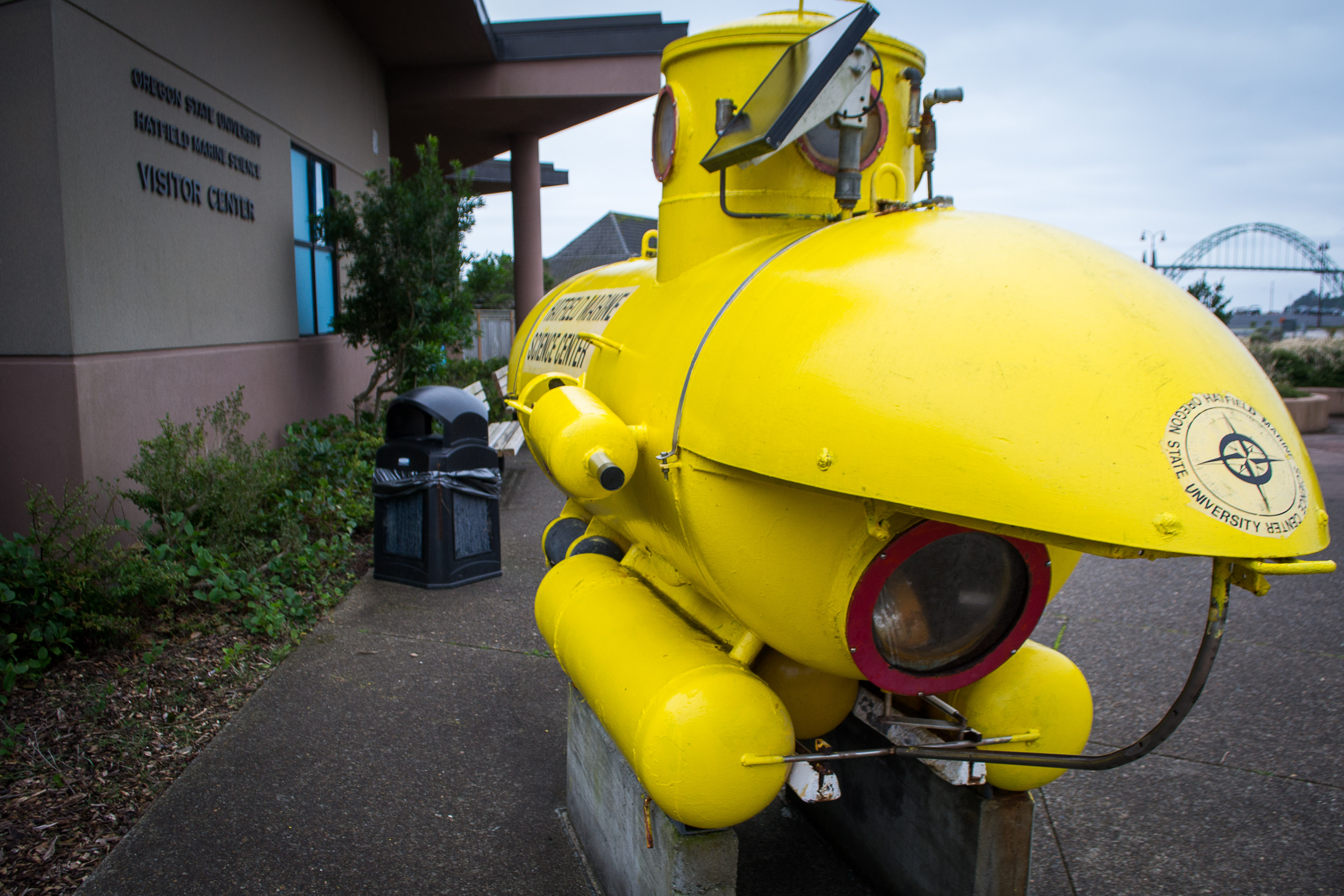
A crewed submersible, once used for underwater research, on display at the Hatfield Marine Science Center.

Recognized as one of the top marine laboratories in the nation, OSU's Hatfield Marine Science Center has been a fixture in Newport, Oregon for over 50 years. The campus serves as an oceanographic research base for six state and federal agencies and also a resource for K-12 educators and the public. OSU's agriculture, oceanography and marine science students have an opportunity to serve as summer interns at the Newport campus, while post-graduate students participate in a wide array of research programs year-around.

A $16.5 million project to build a 34,000-square-foot dormitory for OSU's post-graduate students, staff and visiting professionals was completed in 2025. The complex includes 70+ studio-style apartments and a small number of two-bedroom apartments near the Newport campus.

=== Food Innovation Center (Portland) ===
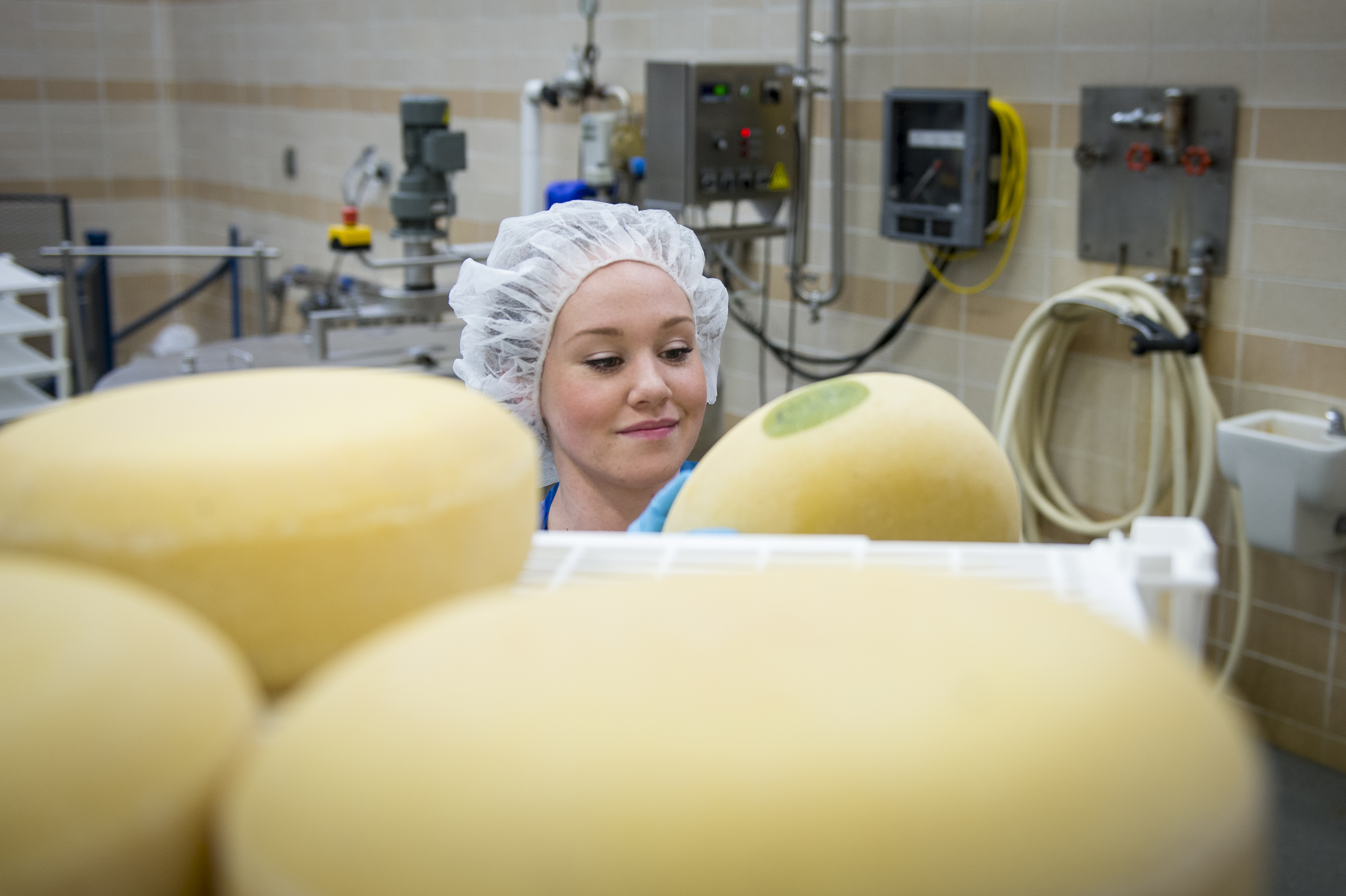
An OSU student and researcher stacks ten-pound wheels of freshly made Beaver Classic cheese. Photo by Karl Maasdam

The College of Agriculture operates the Food Innovation Center (FIC) at its facility in Portland's Naito Parkway. The center is dedicated to helping Oregon's food manufacturers turn culinary innovations into commercially successful products. Researchers at the center offer services in product development, food safety, packaging design, marketing, and business plan development. The center operates as a collaboration between the College of Agricultural Sciences and the Oregon Department of Agriculture.

FIC was the first urban agricultural experiment station in the nation and is a unique resource for a wide array of food and beverage companies. FIC operates in a 33,000-square-foot, state-of-the-art facility and supports the state's $5 billion agriculture industry.

== Organization and administration ==
=== Colleges and schools ===
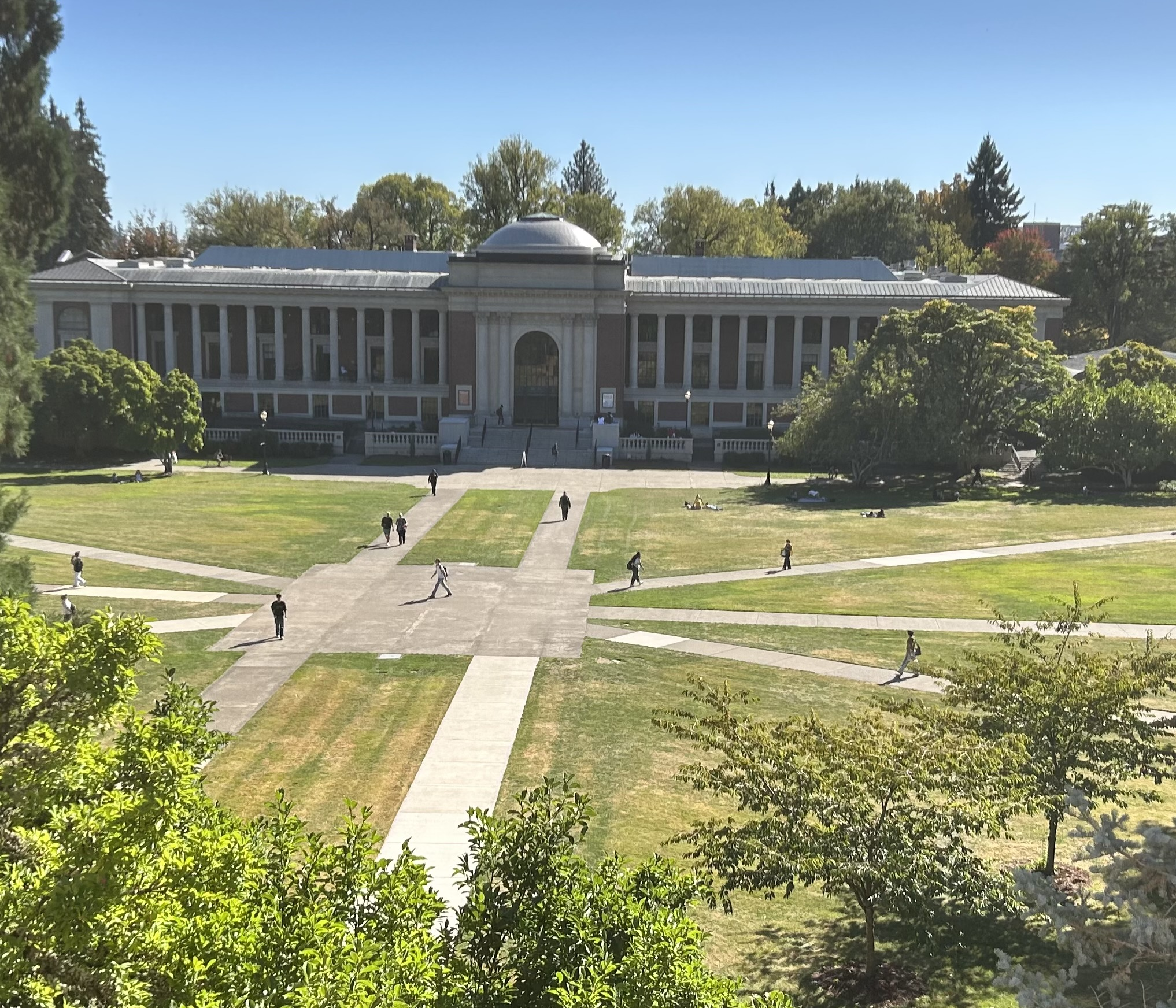
View of the Memorial Union from Milam Hall

All academic courses at OSU operate under the quarter-system, which breaks down into four, 11-week terms. The professional disciplines taught at OSU are divided among 11 colleges, an honors college, and a graduate school. Each college has a dean who is responsible for all faculty, staff, students and academic programs. Colleges are divided into schools or departments, administered by a chair/head/director who oversees program coordinators. Each school or department is responsible for academic programs leading to degrees, certificates, options or minors.

- College of Agricultural Sciences
- College of Business
- College of Earth, Ocean, and Atmospheric Sciences
- College of Education
- College of Engineering
- College of Forestry
- College of Liberal Arts
- College of Pharmacy
- College of Health
- College of Science
- Carlson College of Veterinary Medicine
- University Honors College (Note: Supplemental to discipline-majors.)

=== Educational extension ===
The OSU Educational Extension is a section for non-students and adult education.

=== Extension Service ===
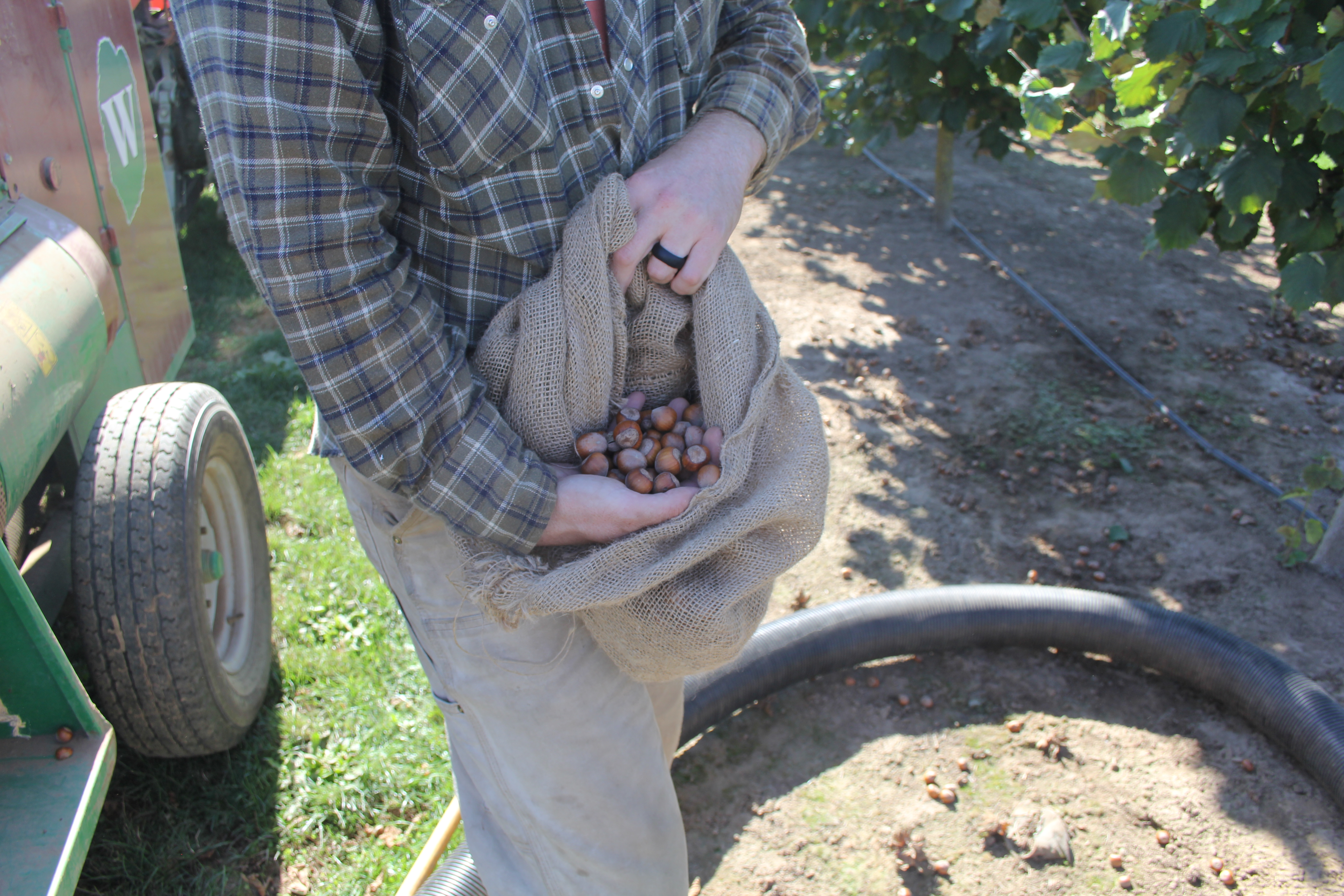
Researchers at the OSU N. Willamette Research & Extension Center inspecting Hazelnuts. Photo: Sean Nealon.

The OSU Extension service is an agricultural extension established on July 24, 1911, under the leadership of Vice Provost Ivory W. Lyles (OSU Extension Service Administration). There are OSU Extension offices, Combined Experiment & Oregon Agricultural Experiment Stations, and Branch Experiment Stations located throughout the state. Programs include 4-H Youth Development, Agriculture and Natural Resources (includes OSU Master Gardener), Family and Community Health/SNAP-Ed, Forestry and Natural Resources, OSU Open Campus, K-12 Outdoor School, and Oregon Sea Grant.

=== Funding ===
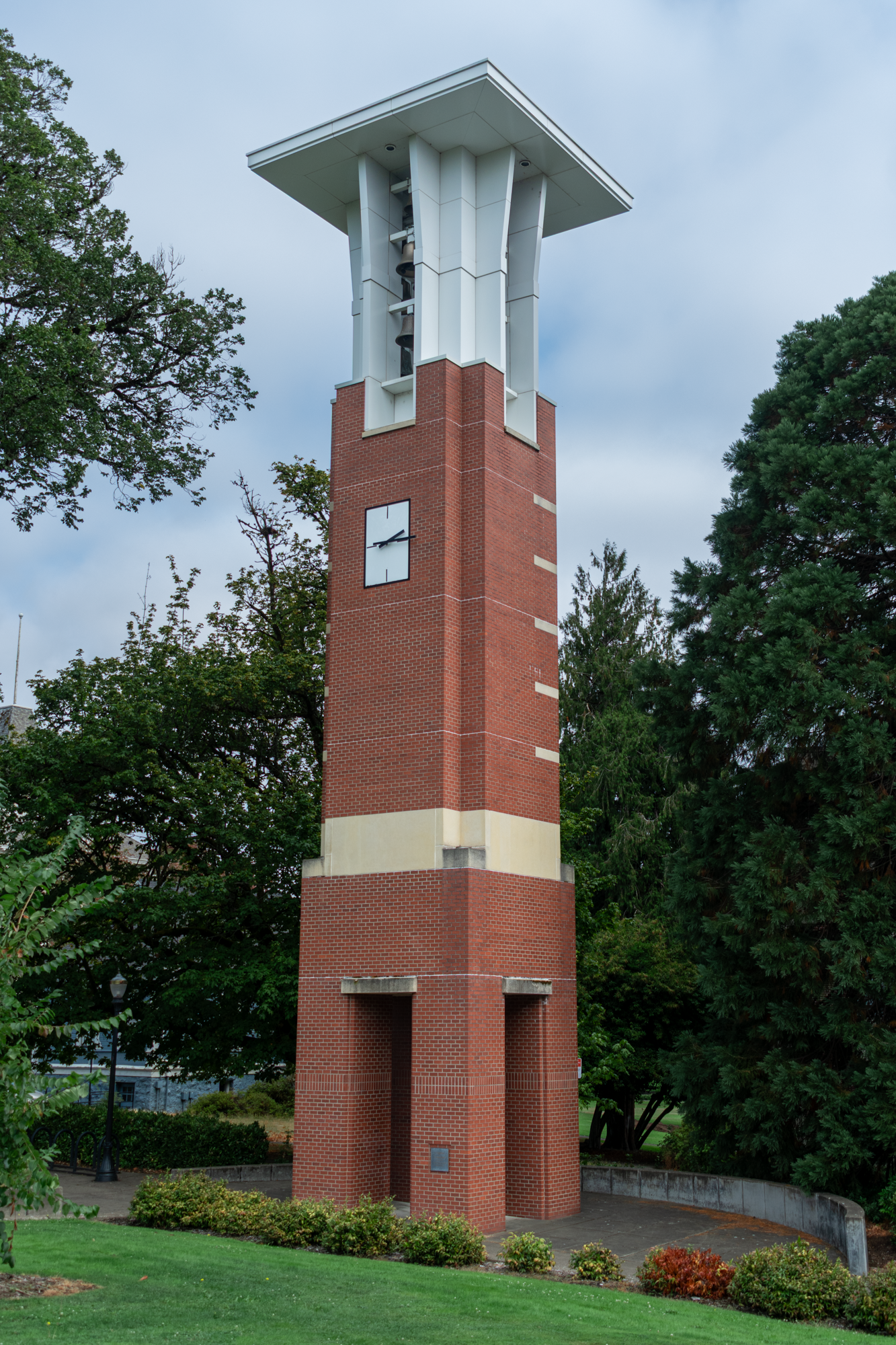
OSU's Beta Campanile Tower

Together with university leaders, the Oregon State University Foundation publicly launched Oregon State's first comprehensive fundraising campaign, The Campaign for OSU, on October 26, 2007, with a goal of $625 million. Donors exceeded the goal in October 2010 nearly a year ahead of schedule, resulting in a goal increase to $850 million. In March 2012, the goal was raised to $1 billion. At OSU's annual State of the University address in Portland on January 31, 2014, President Edward J. Ray announced that campaign contributions had passed $1 billion, making OSU one of 35 public universities to cross the billion-dollar fundraising mark and one of only two organizations in the Pacific Northwest to reach that milestone. The Campaign for OSU concluded on December 31, 2014, with more than $1.1 billion from 106,000 donors.

The Oregon State University Foundation is a nonprofit organization chartered to raise and administer private funds in support of the university's education, research and outreach, governed by a volunteer board of trustees. It holds net assets exceeding $1 billion and manages most of the university's composite endowment, valued at more than $827 million.

In October 2022, the Foundation publicly launched Believe It: The Campaign for OSU, the university's second comprehensive fundraising and engagement campaign, with a $1.75 billion goal for student and faculty support, facilities and equipment and strategic initiatives. Donors have stepped forward with over $1 billion in gifts since the campaign began in 2017.

=== International partnerships ===
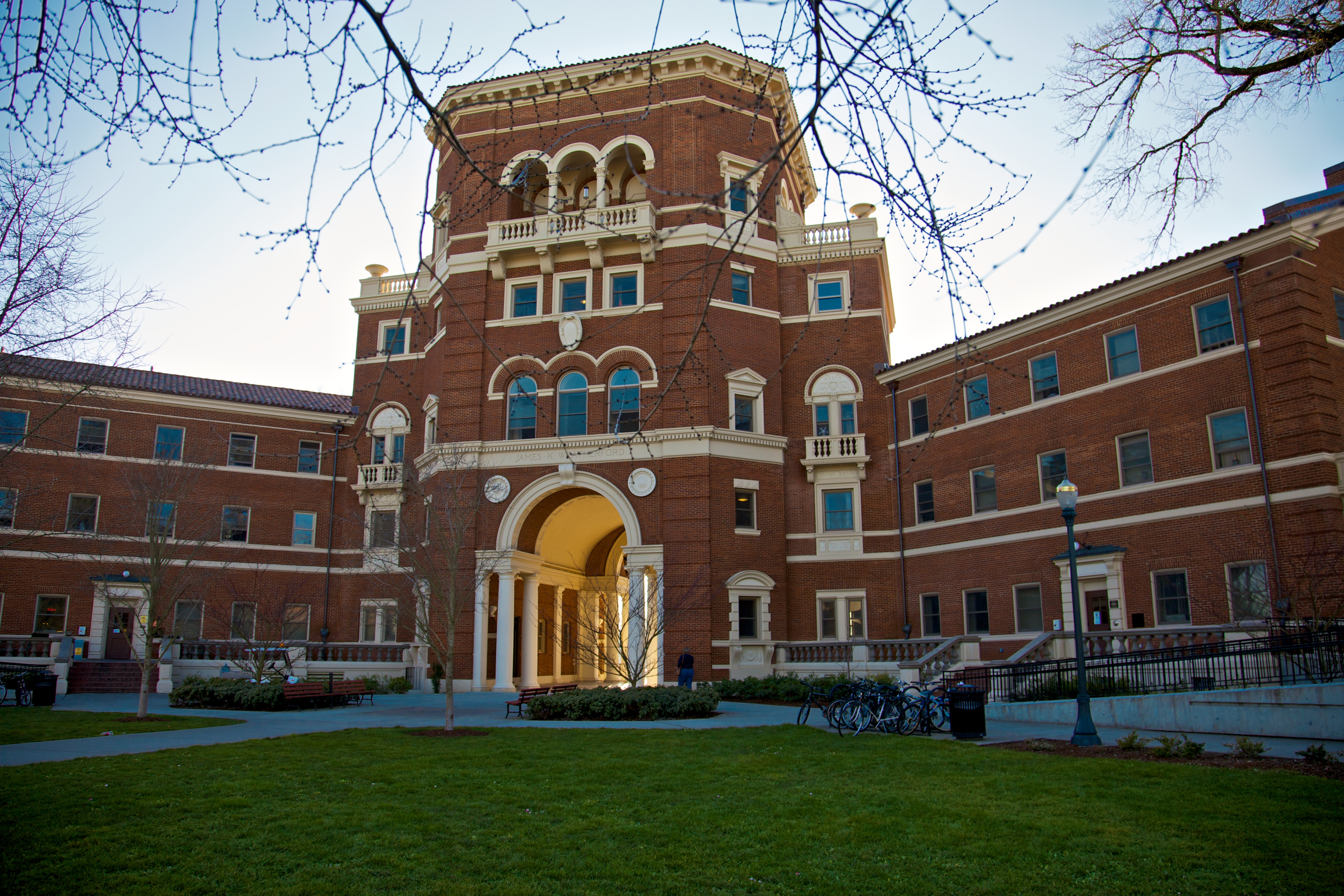
Weatherford Hall, 2009

Oregon State has varied and numerous partnership agreements with international institutions, including James Cook University in Australia, the University of Forestry in Bulgaria, Lincoln University in New Zealand and India's Gokula Education Foundation.

== Academics ==
=== Undergraduate admissions ===
Undergraduate admission to Oregon State is rated "selective" by U.S. News & World Report. OSU is the largest university in the state and set a new record for enrollment in 2023. Close to 37,000 students attended the university during the year - the most for any Oregon university on record.

For fall 2015, OSU received 14,058 freshman applications; 11,016 were admitted (78.4%) and 3,593 enrolled. Fall of 2022 brought in the largest freshman class the university had seen, with 7,146 new students. The average high school grade point average (GPA) of the enrolled freshmen was 3.58, while the middle 50% range of SAT scores were 480-610 for critical reading, 490-630 for math, and 470-590 for writing. The middle 50% range of the ACT Composite score was 21–28.

Annual Incoming Student Cohort Statistics, 2011–2017
2011	2012	2013	2014	2015	2016	
Applicants	12,197	12,330	14,239	14,115	14,058	14,595
Admissions	9,471	9,720	11,303	10,975	11,016	11,308
% Admitted	77.7	78.8	79.4	77.8	78.4	77.5
Enrolled	3,506	3,333	3,970	3,718	3,593	3,814
Median GPA	3.56	3.56	3.56	3.59	3.58	3.67
Combined SAT (max. 2400) (Note: Ranges shown represent the thresholds for the second quartile (25%) and top quartile (75%) of all scores submitted that year.)	N/A	1430-1810	1430-1810	1440-1820	1440-1830	1460-1830
ACT Composite (max. 36)	21-27	21-27	21-27	21-28	21-28	22-28

=== Areas of Study ===
OSU has more majors, minors and special programs than any other university or college in Oregon. Several undergraduate programs are unique. Ecological Engineering, the first undergraduate degree of its kind in the United States, integrates engineering principles with ecological science to design sustainable systems. Radiation Health Physics and Nuclear Engineering focus on nuclear technology, radiation safety, and related applications. Both programs are uncommon on the West Coast. Forest Engineering, Wood Innovation for Sustainability, and Rangeland Sciences are similarly distinctive.

=== Research ===
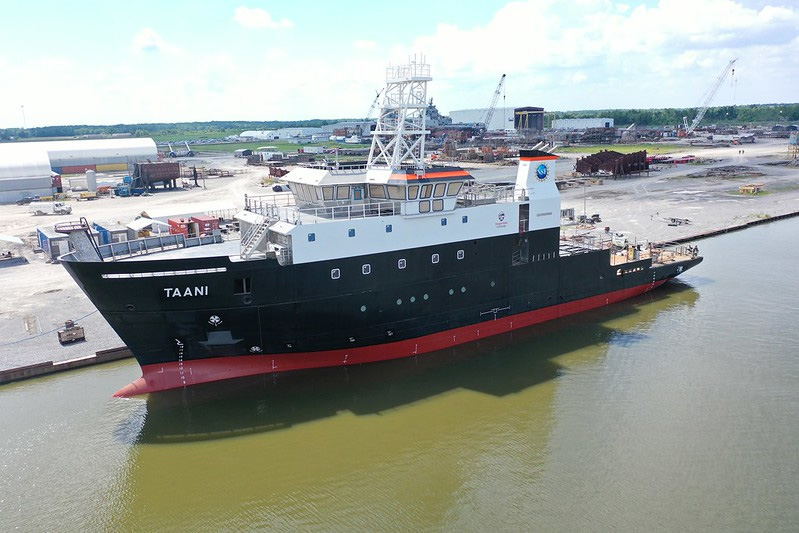
The R/V Taani. One of Oregon State University's three new research vessels (launched in 2023).

Research has played a central role in the university's overall operations for much of its history. Most of OSU's research continues at the Corvallis campus, but an increasing number of endeavors are underway at locations throughout the state and abroad. Research facilities beyond the campus include the John L. Fryer Aquatic Animal Health Laboratory in Corvallis, the Seafood Laboratory in Astoria and the Food Innovation Center (FIC) in Portland.

The 2005 Carnegie Classification of Institutions of Higher Education recognized OSU as a "comprehensive doctoral with medical/veterinary" university. It is one of three such universities in the Pacific Northwest to be classified in this category. In 2006, Carnegie also recognized OSU as having "very high research activity", making it the only university in Oregon to attain these combined classifications.

OSU was one of the early members of the federal Space Grant program. Designated in 1991, the additional grant program made Oregon State one of only 13 schools in the United States at that time to serve as a combined Land Grant, Sea Grant and Space Grant university.

Researchers at OSU have improved the quality and yields of Oregon's grains and vegetables, particularly through its work in wheat and hops breeding programs. The Cascade hop, widely used in American craft brewing, was developed at Oregon State University and released in 1971. The Department of Food Science and Technology maintains a fully automated research brewery that has partnered with private industry to develop beer recipes and test products.

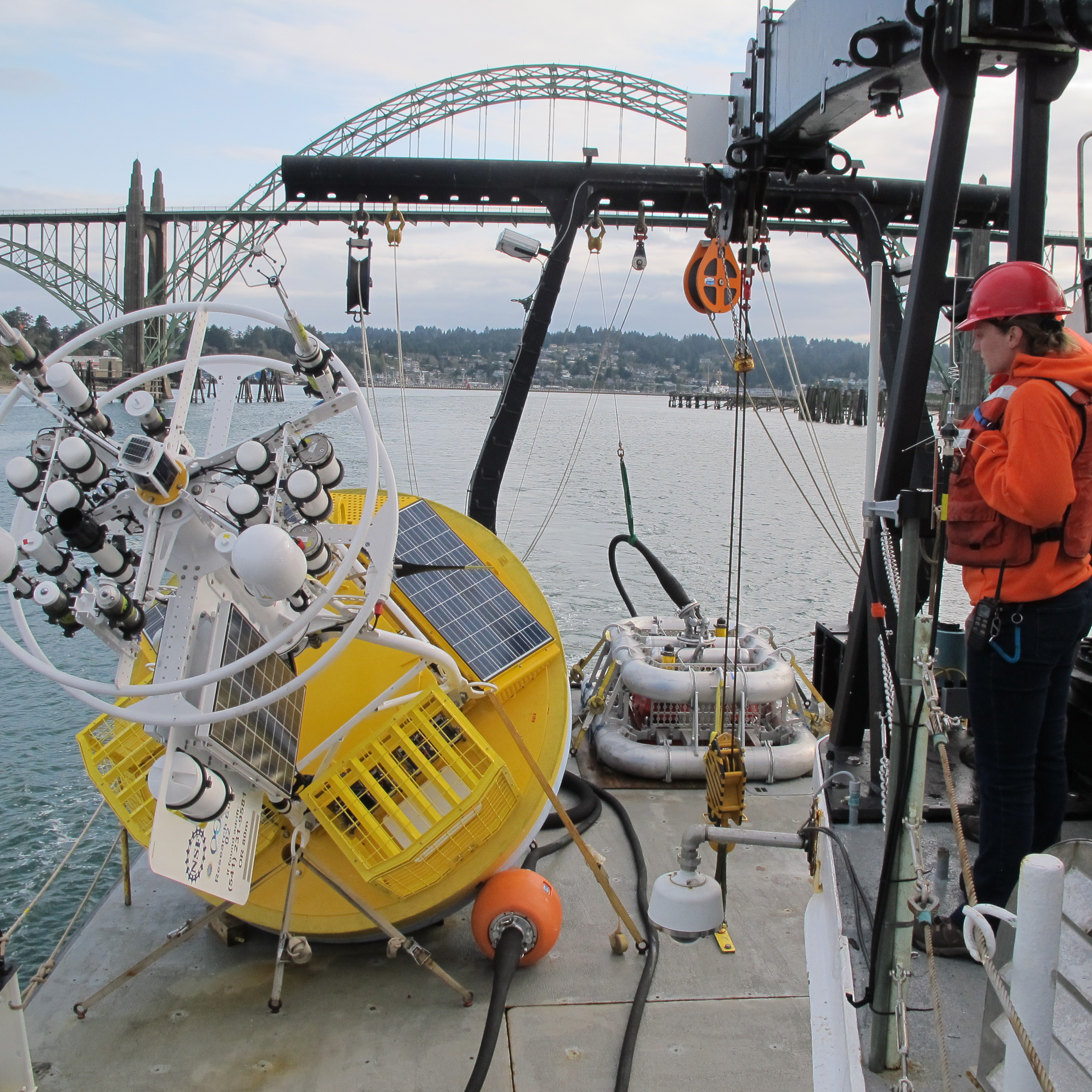
An OSU marine technician at Hatfield Marine Science Center prepares a surface mooring

The university's College of Earth, Ocean and Atmospheric Sciences (CEOAS) operates several laboratories, including the Hatfield Marine Science Center and multiple oceanographic research vessels based in Newport, Oregon. CEOAS is co-leading the largest ocean science project in U.S. history. The Ocean Observatories Initiative (OOI) features a fleet of undersea gliders at six sites in the Pacific and Atlantic Oceans with multiple observation platforms. CEOAS is also leading the design and construction of the next class of ocean-faring research vessels for the National Science Foundation, which will be the largest grant or contract ever received by any Oregon university. The first of three planned research vessels, the Taani, was launched in May 2023 and will be stationed in Newport.

OSU also manages nearly 11,250 acres (4,550 ha) of forest land, including the McDonald-Dunn Research Forest.

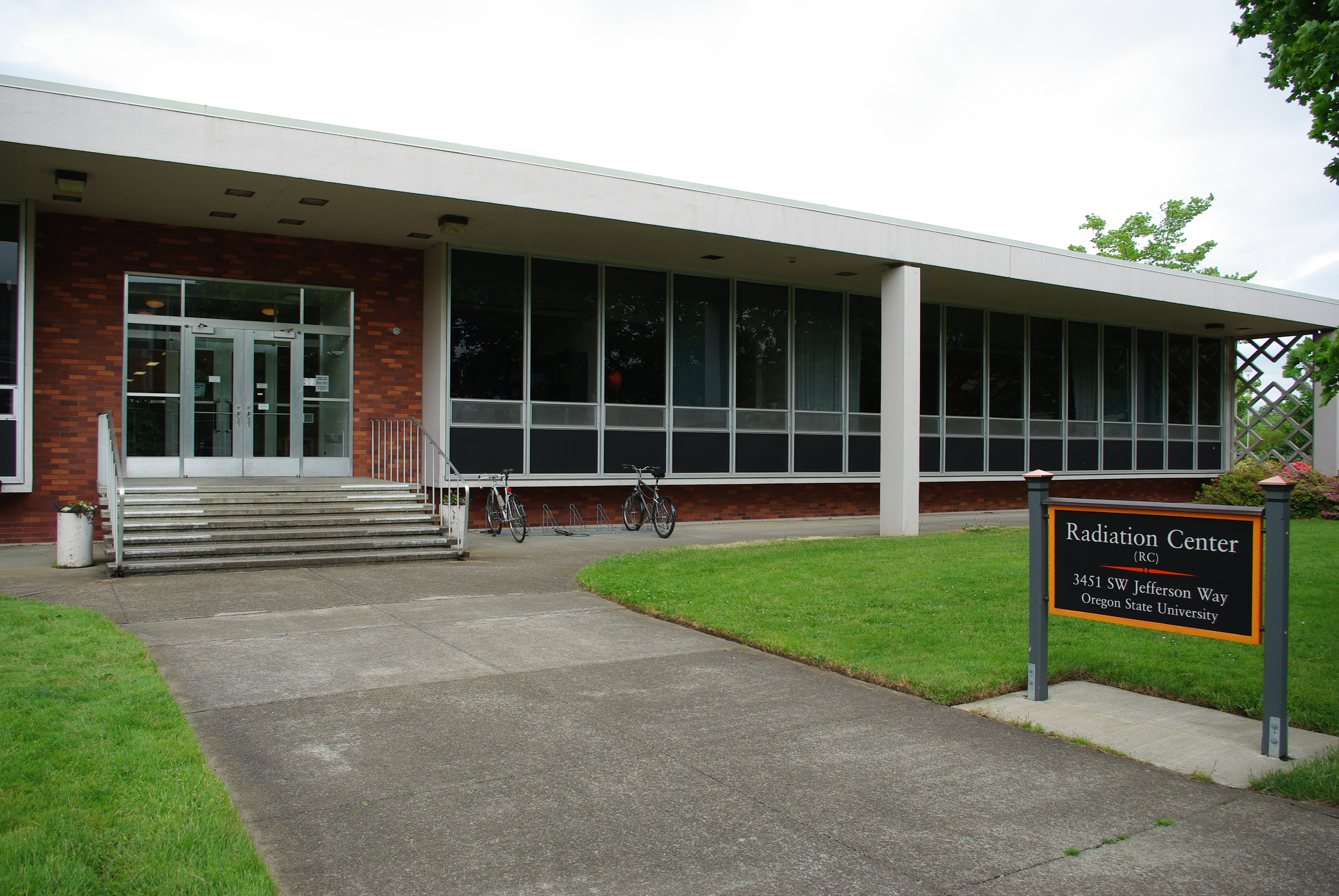
The OSU Radiation Center.

In 1967 the Radiation Center was constructed at the edge of campus, housing a 1.1 MW TRIGA Mark II Research Reactor. The reactor is equipped to utilize high-assay, low-enriched (HALEU) uranium zirconium hydride fuel. U.S. News & World Report's 2008 rankings placed OSU eighth in the nation in graduate nuclear engineering. In the early 2000s, researchers at the campus reactor developed a prototype small modular reactor (SMR) to power large commercial operations, buildings, and large industrial facilities. More recently, Oregon State University has partnered with a leading manufacturer of SMRs, NuScale (a company started in part by OSU faculty), to provide continued research and development for commercial applications.

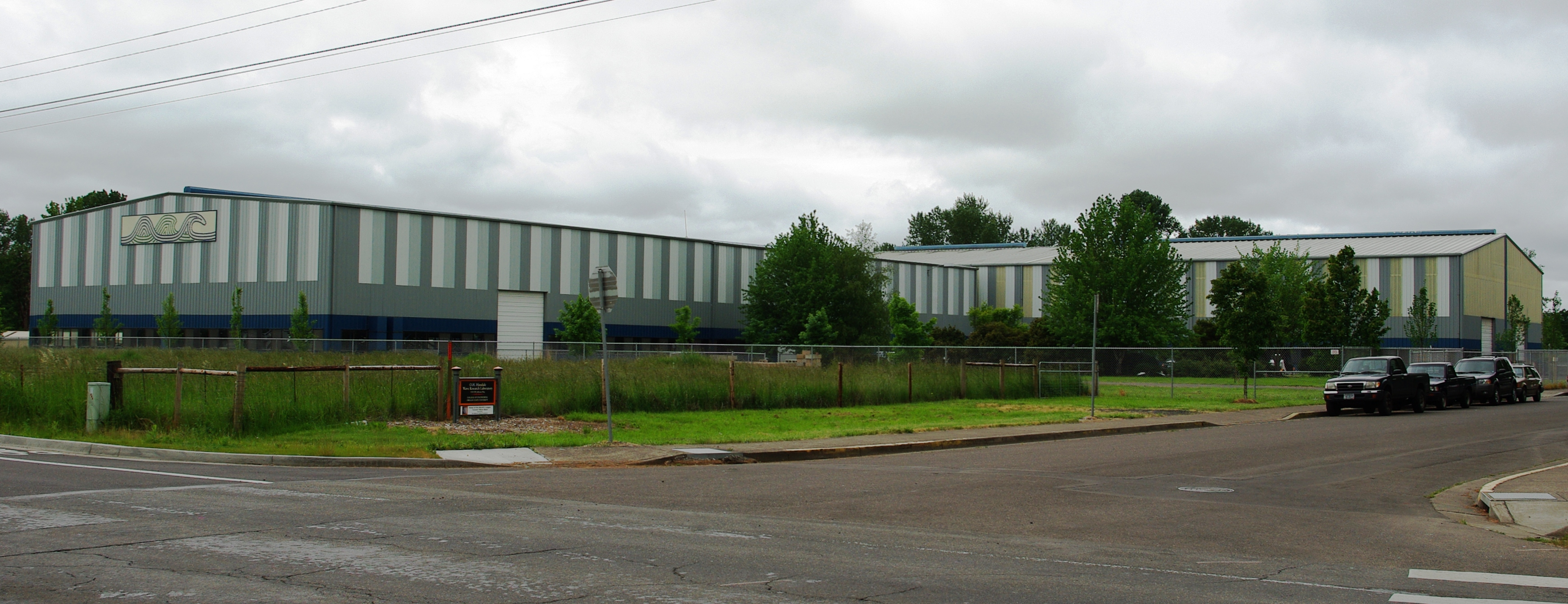
The O. H. Hinsdale Wave Research Laboratory.

The university's College of Earth, Ocean and Atmospheric Sciences (CEOAS) operates several laboratories, including the Hatfield Marine Science Center and multiple oceanographic research vessels based in Newport. In 2001, OSU's Wave Research Laboratory was designated by the National Science Foundation as a site for tsunami research under the Network for Earthquake Engineering Simulation. The O. H. Hinsdale Wave Research Laboratory is on the edge of the campus and is one of the world's largest and most sophisticated laboratories for education, research and testing in coastal, ocean and related areas.

Oregon State University operates two off-shore research test facilities near Newport for commercial wave energy technology companies to stress test prototypes. The North and South PacWave Energy Test Facilities are located several miles off the coast of Newport and serviced by the university's Hatfield Marine Science Center. The South PacWave Test Facility is an open ocean test site consisting of four berths, which occupy two square nautical miles of ocean with a cable route to shore of approximately 12 miles in length. The North PacWave Test Facility offers a site in state waters with streamlined permitting (the expected time to permit is under one year). The site is shallower than PacWave South and closer to port.

The National Institute of Environmental Health Sciences funds two research centers at OSU. The Environmental Health Sciences Center has been funded since 1969 and the Superfund Research Center has been funded since 2009.

OSU administers the H.J. Andrews Experimental Forest, a United States Forest Service facility dedicated to forestry and ecology research. The Andrews Forest is a UNESCO International Biosphere Reserve.

OSU's Open Source Lab is a nonprofit founded in 2003 and funded in part by corporate sponsors that include Facebook, Google, and IBM. The organization's goal is to advance open source technology by hiring and training students in software development and operations for large-scale coding projects. The lab hosts a number of projects, including contracted work for the Linux Foundation and Oregon State Wireless Active Learning Device.

=== Military ===
Construction of the Oregon Agricultural College Armory (later McAlexander Fieldhouse), was completed in 1910.

Oregon State University is one of the few universities to have ROTC detachments for each branch of the US Military. Oregon State University Army ROTC is a distinguished program and has been taught regularly since 1873. The so-called Beaver Battalion is known as the West Point of the West for producing more commissioned officers than any other non-military school during World War II. It is located in McAlexander Fieldhouse, named after General Ulysses G. McAlexander, the former commander of Army ROTC.

After the Second World War ended in 1945, a Department of Naval Science was added at Oregon State. Providing officer training for both the US Navy and the US Marine Corps, it became one of the largest in the nation and has earned the unofficial title "Naval Academy of the Northwest." On July 1, 1949, the US Army Air Corps training branch became a separate officer training unit later known as Aerospace Science. The Oregon State Air Force ROTC draws more freshmen scholarships than any other AFROTC unit in the nation and has had over 1,000 officers commissioned. In 1977, two graduates of the OSU AFROTC became the first women pilots in the Air Force. The Army and Air Force ROTC programs at the university share the McAlexander Fieldhouse.

=== Libraries ===
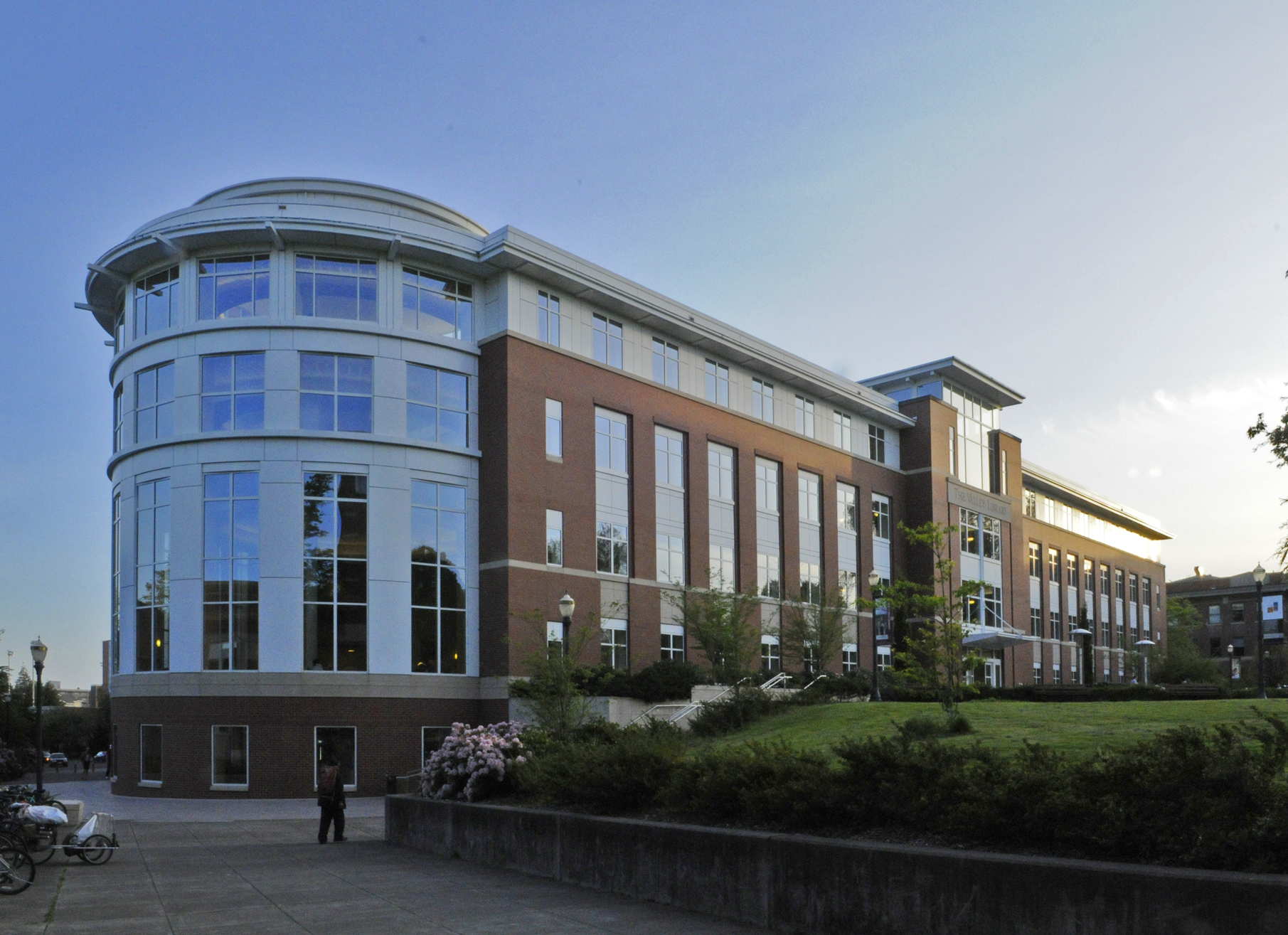
The Valley Library

In 1999, OSU finished a $40 million remodeling of the campus library. Known as the Valley Library, the remodeled building was selected by The Library Journal as its 1999 Library of the Year, the first academic library so named.

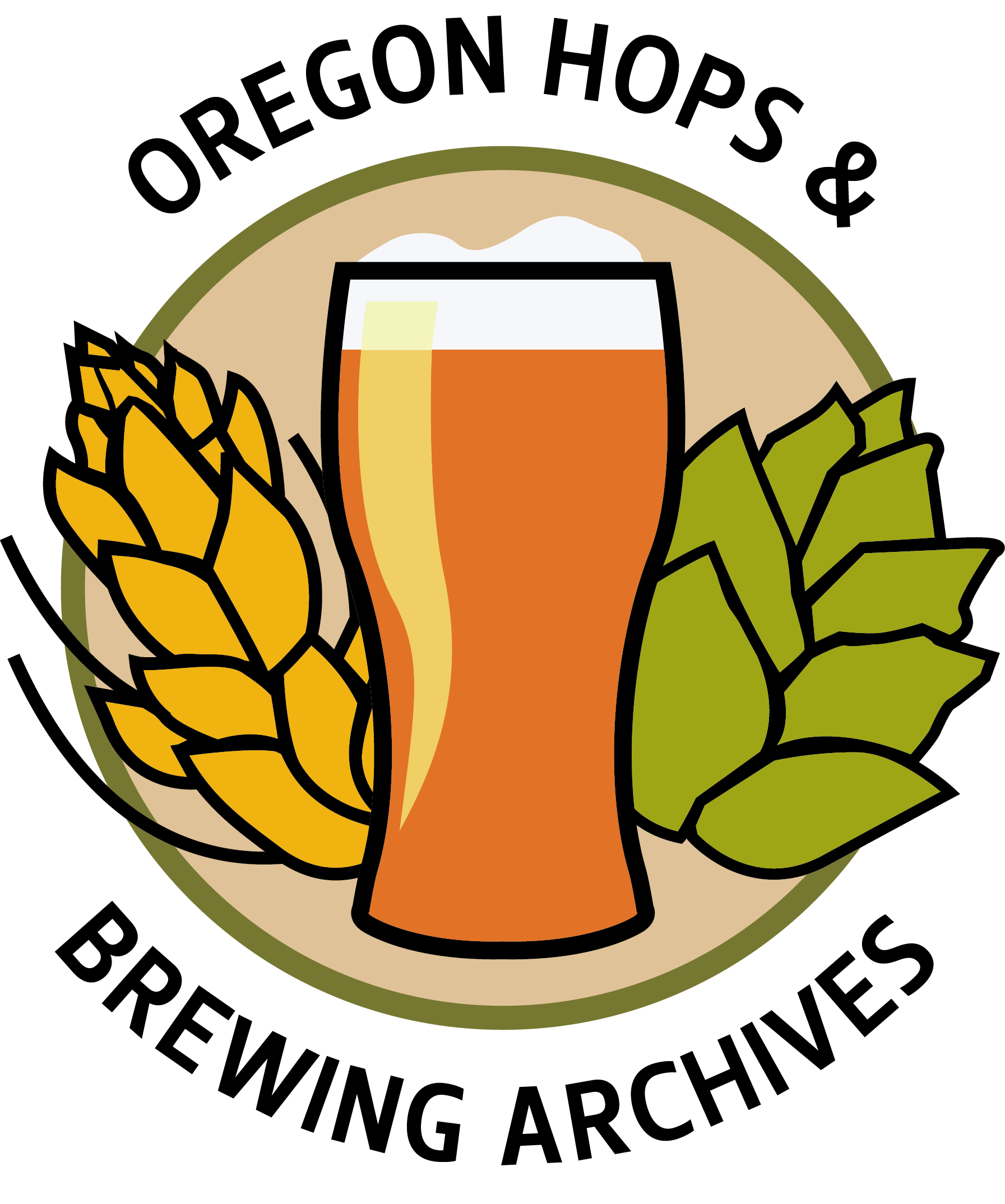

The Valley Library is home to the Oregon Hops and Brewing Archives, the first archive in the United States dedicated to collecting, preserving, and sharing the history of hops cultivation and brewing in the Pacific Northwest. Housed in OSU’s Special Collections and Archives Research Center, the archive contains materials related to regional hops and barley farming, craft and home brewing, cider, mead, and OSU’s own brewing research dating back to the 1890s. The archive’s collections include the papers of Fred Eckhardt, industry periodicals, research reports, oral histories, photographs, memorabilia, brewery advertising art, and records from organizations like the Oregon Hop Growers Association and Pink Boots Society.

=== Rankings and recognition ===
In 2023, the Center for World University Rankings (CWUR) ranked Oregon State University in the top 1.4 percent out of 20,531 degree-granting institutions of higher education worldwide. The CWUR is known for relying heavily on outcome-based data to compile their rankings.

In 2021, U.S. News & World Report ranked OSU tied for 139th nationally, tied for 71st top public and tied for 58th "most innovative" university in the U.S., and tied for 277th best globally.

In its 2021 Global Ranking of Academic Subjects, the Academic Ranking of World Universities (ARWU) ranked Oregon State University's oceanography program 5th in the world, its agricultural sciences program in the top 50 worldwide, and its earth sciences, ecology and water resources program among the top 100 worldwide.

Agriculture and forestry at Oregon State University rank 26th in the world (11th in the U.S.), according to QS World University Rankings in 2021.

In 2012, ECONorthwest conducted an economic impact analysis that found that each year OSU has a $2.06 billion economic footprint. $1.93 billion of this total was in the state of Oregon.

Academic rankings

National
- Forbes: 119
- U.S. News & World Report: 142
- Washington Monthly: 137
- WSJ/College Pulse: 167

Global
- ARWU: 201–300
- QS: 624
- THE: 401-500
- U.S. News & World Report: 399

National Program Rankings
Program	Ranking
Biological Sciences	90
Business	99-131
Chemistry	81
Computer Science	68
Earth Sciences	31
Economics	90
Education	123
Engineering	74
Mathematics	74
Pharmacy	31
Physics	83
Psychology	148
Public Affairs	101
Public Health	54
Statistics	74
Veterinary Medicine	24

Global Program Rankings
Program	Ranking
Agricultural Sciences	52
Biology & Biochemistry	247
Chemistry	488
Clinical Medicine	560
Engineering	412
Environment/Ecology	41
Geosciences	40
Materials Science	380
Microbiology	139
Molecular Biology & Genetics	393
Physics	684
Plant & Animal Science	25
Social Sciences & Public Health	201

== Student life ==
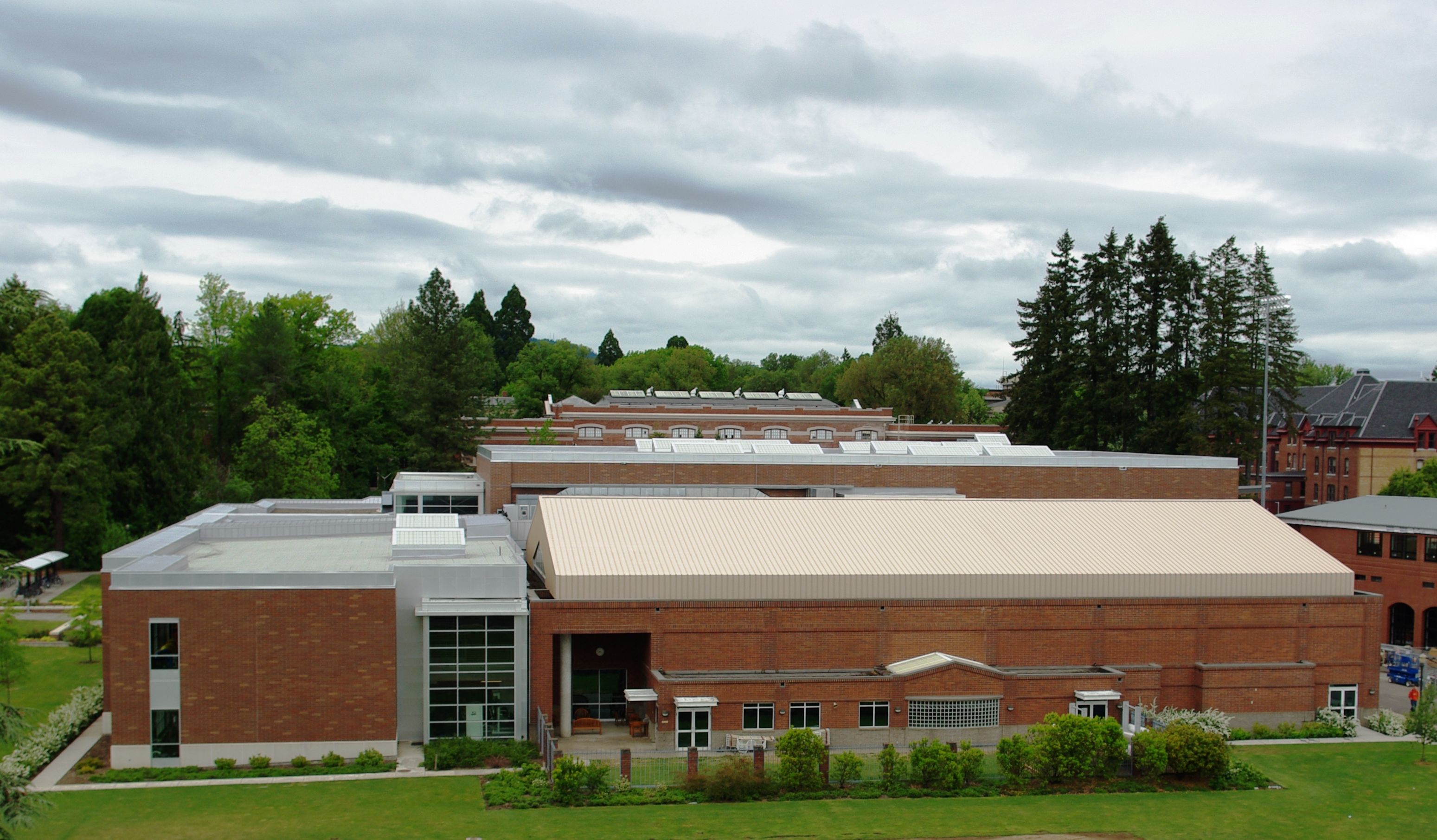
Dixon Recreation Center

Corvallis is Oregon's 9th-largest city. It is a relatively small community and many of the local events have a strong connection to the university. OSU has over 400 active student organizations and groups. The campus is only a few hours' driving distance from any number of outdoor recreation opportunities. Several federal and state natural forests and parks are popular student destinations. These include the Cascade Range, a rugged coastline, several large forests, the high desert and numerous rivers and lakes. Portland, Oregon's largest city, is 85 mi (137 km) north of campus.

From 1930 to 1968, OSU was home to the Gamma chapter of Phrateres, a philanthropic-social organization for female college students. Gamma was the third chapter of the organization, which eventually had over 20 chapters in Canada and the U.S.

Most older OSU students live off campus, but on-campus housing is available and required for most incoming freshmen. There are 16 residence halls on campus.

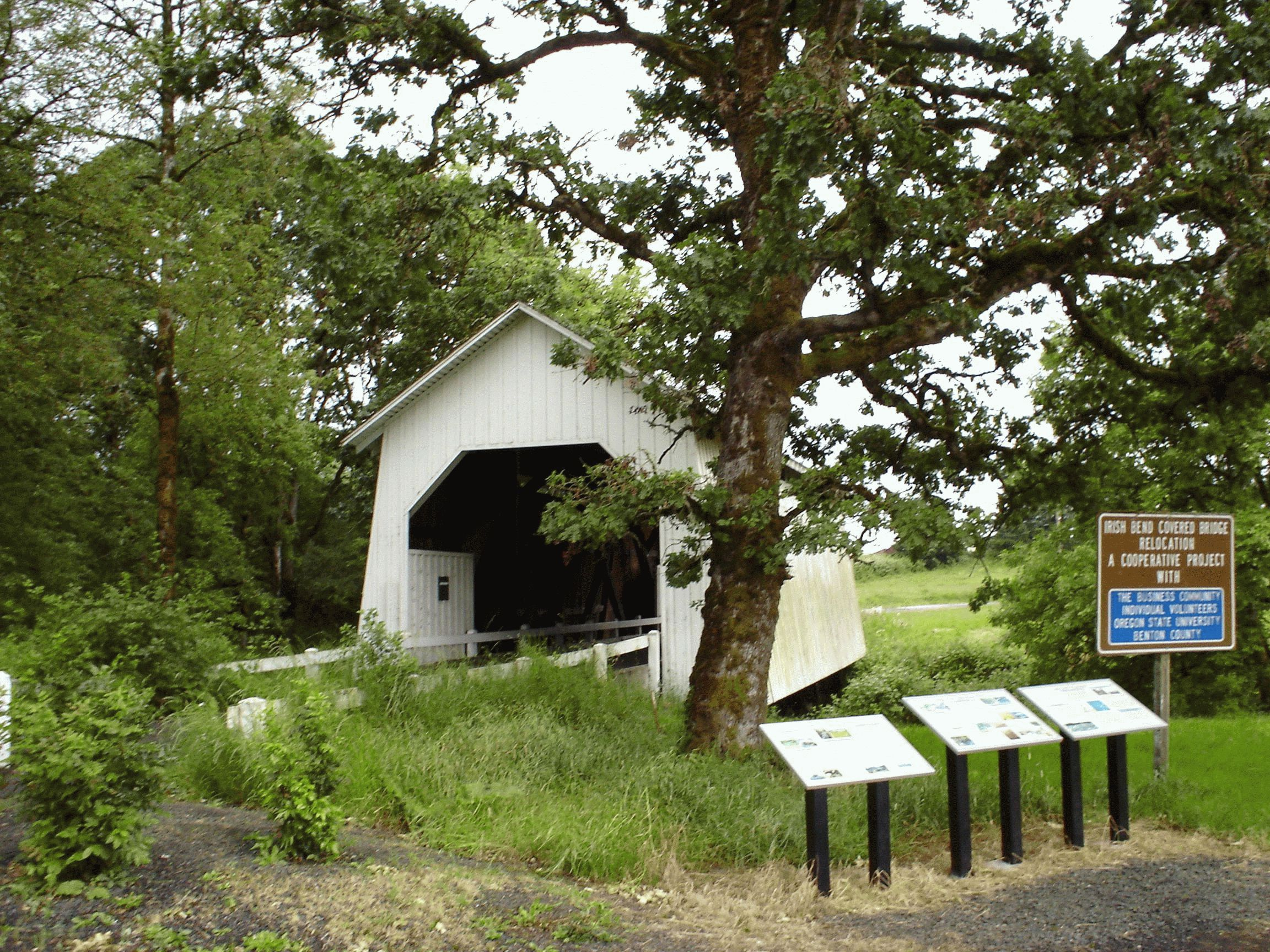
Irish Bend Covered Bridge - The west side of campus is dedicated, primarily, to agricultural research. It is also home to this historic landmark.

The LaSells Stewart Center is the conference and performing arts center for the campus. Many famous speakers have graced the stage of the campus's main auditorium, Austin Auditorium, while the Corvallis-OSU Symphony plays there frequently. The OSU Office of Conferences and Special Events is in the auditorium.

The PRAx (Patricia Valian Reser Center for the Creative Arts) is a 49,000 square foot arts center at Oregon State University. It features the nearly 500 seat Lynne Hallstrom Detrick Concert Hall, 200 seat Edward J. Ray Theater, The 3,000-square-foot Kate and John Stirek Art Gallery, Dixie Luana Wooton Kenney Garden, Thomas W. Toomey Lobby and Celia Strickland Austin & Ken Austin III | Loni Austin Parrish & Scott N. Parrish Arts Plaza.

The university is home to Orange Media Network, the university's student media department. Orange Media Network encompasses the award-winning The Daily Barometer student newspaper, KBVR 88.7 FM, KBVR-TV, Prism Art and Literary Journal, lifestyle magazine Beaver's Digest, and fashion magazine DAMchic.

=== Student clubs ===
OSU offers a wide variety of student organizations, including the highly successful motorsport teams Global Formula Racing and Beaver Racing.

Global Formula Racing (GFR) is an international collaboration formed in 2009 by combining the engineering talents of OSU and the Baden-Württemberg Cooperative State University (DHBW) Ravensburg in Germany. Students across both continents collaborate daily to design, manufacture, and race cars for the Global Formula SAE and Formula Student competitions. GFR has been successful in securing numerous championship titles worldwide.

In contrast to GFR's track racing, OSU's Beaver Racing team specializes in Baja SAE, where students design and build off-road vehicles built to endure extreme terrains and intense endurance challenges.

=== Student government ===
The Associated Students of Oregon State University (ASOSU) is the officially recognized student government at Oregon State University and represents all students in campus affairs and at community, state and federal levels regarding issues that directly influence the quality of and access to, post-secondary education.

=== Diversity ===
Undergraduate demographics as of Fall 2023
Race and ethnicity	Total
White	64%
Hispanic	13%
Asian	8%
Two or more races	7%
International student	3%
Black	2%
Unknown	2%
American Indian/Alaska Native	1%
Economic diversity
Low-income (Note: The percentage of students who received an income-based federal Pell grant intended for low-income students.)	23%
Affluent (Note: The percentage of students who are a part of the American middle class at the bare minimum.)	77%

Like most American universities and colleges, OSU actively works to diversify its faculty and staff. In 1993, OSU reported having difficulties retaining and hiring minority faculty members. Only 150 out of 2,284 faculty members were Black, Native American, Asian, or Hispanic. In response, the school president and vice president introduced a hiring initiative to promote and enhance diversity. The initiative "recognizes the compelling need to build a welcoming and inclusive university community and the direct relationship between excellence and diversity".

Oregon State University has several cultural centers aimed at promoting diversity and supporting students of color, including the Lonnie B. Harris Black Cultural Center, Native American Longhouse, Asian & Pacific Cultural Center and the Centro Cultural César Chávez. It also has a Pride Center for lesbian, gay, bisexual and transgender students.

In the fall of 2022, 30 percent of Oregon State University's total enrollment was composed of students of color.

== Athletics ==
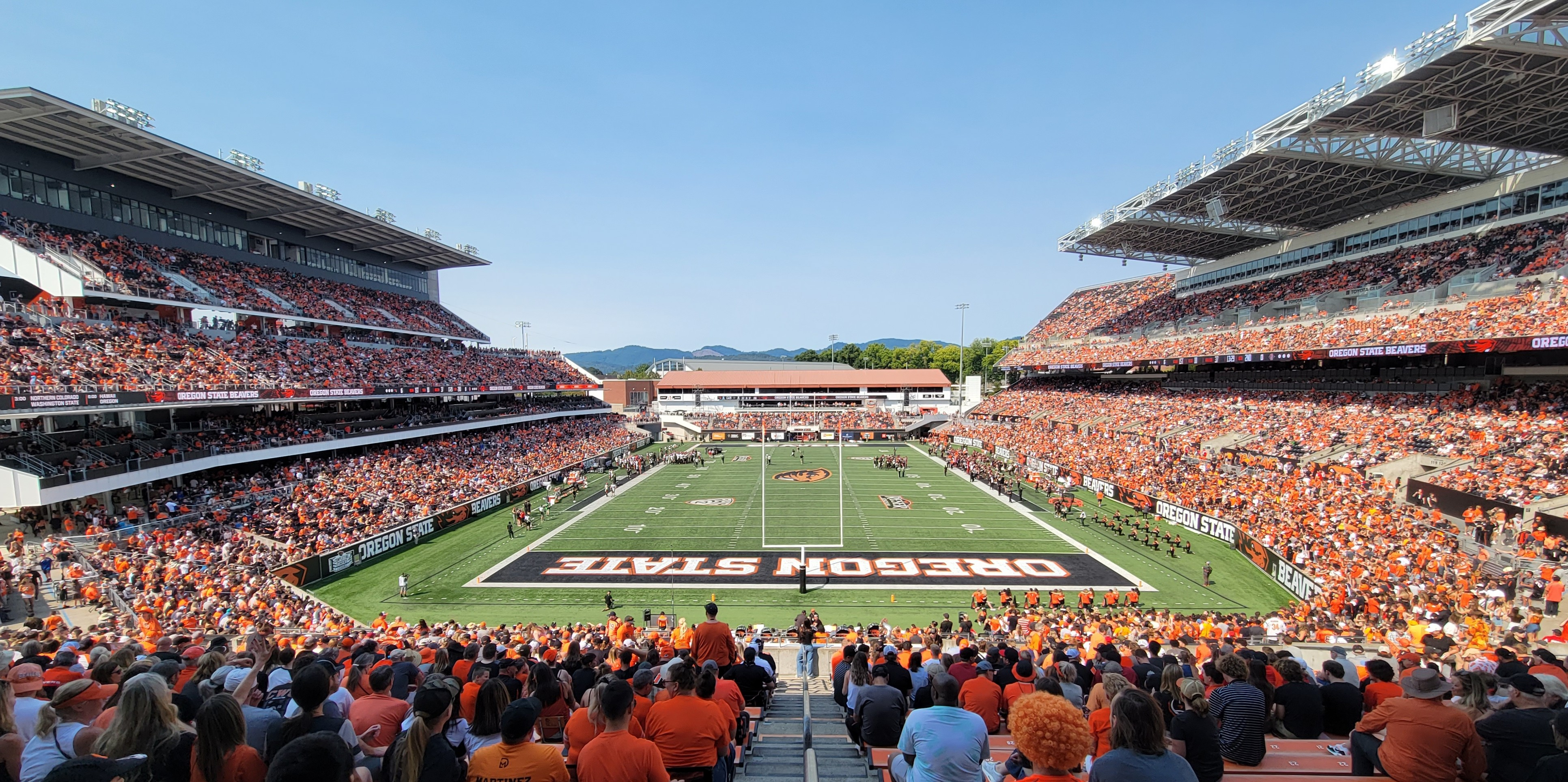
Reser Stadium in 2023

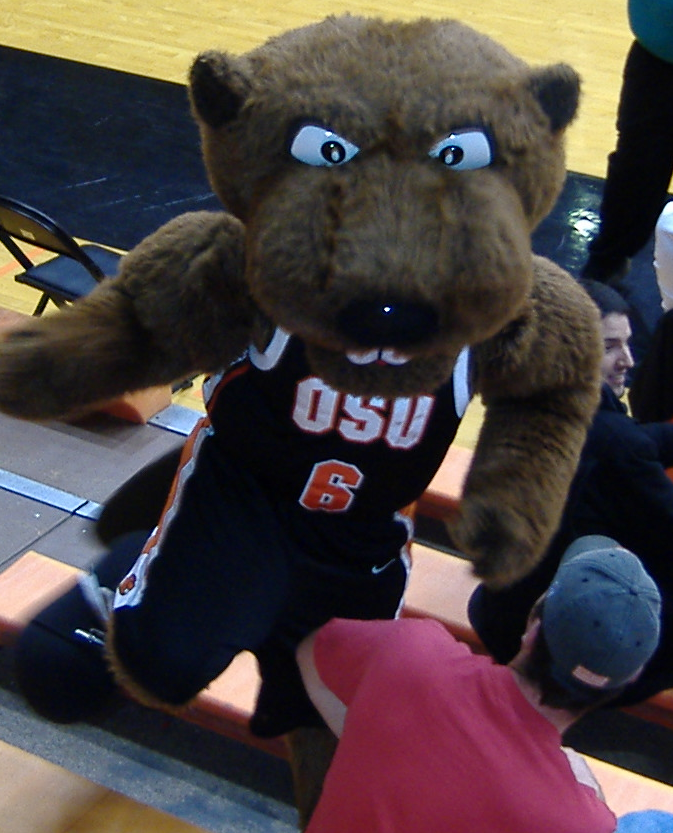
OSU mascot Benny Beaver

In a 2008 national ranking of academics, athletic opportunity and overall performance, Oregon State was selected as one of America's "premier" universities. The ranking, performed by STACK magazine, placed Oregon State 29th in the nation's "Elite 50" universities.

The history of Oregon State athletics dates back to 1893 when "Jimmie the Coyote" was recognized as the first official mascot. In 1910, the official mascot was replaced by the beaver and remains the school's mascot to this day. In 1915, the university's varsity athletic teams were invited to join the Pacific Coast (Athletic) Conference as one of four charter members.

Reser Stadium now serves as the home field for the school's football team. The school mascot is Benny the Beaver and first appeared on the football sidelines in 1952. The next year Oregon State added a football stadium to its campus, known then as Parker Stadium. Fundraisers in 2006 and 2007 helped expand Reser Stadium from 35,000 seats to 46,200. A time lapse video recording of the expansion is viewable on the internet. 1962 saw OSU's (and the west coast's) first Heisman Trophy winner, quarterback Terry Baker. The University of Oregon is the university's in-state rival for athletics. The annual Oregon–Oregon State football rivalry football game is one of the longest-running rivalries in all of college football.

The university's home golf course, Trysting Tree's, features championship-worthy golf and practice facilities. The name of the course can be traced back to a locally famous tree near Community Hall on campus where student couples would meet to make dates. Basketball is held in Gill Coliseum and named after former Beavers coach Slats Gill. The Coliseum is also home to the university's Collegiate wrestling team. Baseball is played in Goss Stadium at Coleman Field. The OSU baseball team, won back-to-back NCAA Division I Baseball Championships in 2006 and 2007 and added a third win in 2018. Softball is held in the OSU Softball Complex. Opened in April 2001, the $1.5 million OSU Softball Complex seats 750. Oregon State hosted a Regional and Super Regional tournament in the 2006 NCAA tournament, winning both and moving on to the Women's College World Series.

Oregon State has a total of four NCAA championships. In addition to the three baseball titles (2006, 2007 and 2018), the Beavers won the 1961 NCAA Men's Cross Country Championship. In 1975, the men's rowing Varsity-4 with coxswain team won the Intercollegiate Rowing Association National Collegiate Rowing Championships in Syracuse, New York, establishing a course record which stood for 15 years. The Oregon State racquetball team has won 10 consecutive USA racquetball intercollegiate championships, beginning in 2008.

The 2018 Oregon State baseball team won the NCAA Division I Championship defeating the Arkansas Razorbacks in three games making it their third title ever in the sport of baseball managed by the same manager from the previous two titles Pat Casey.

== People ==
=== Faculty and staff ===
OSU has several notable faculty members, including:

- Bernard Malamud, novelist and short-story writer
- George Poinar Jr., entomology professor whose work extracting DNA from insects fossilized in amber was the inspiration for the novel and film Jurassic Park
- William Appleman Williams, historian
- Ernest H. Wiegand, inventor of the modern Maraschino cherry
- Pat Casey, baseball coach who was named Coach of the Year by several publications in both 2006 and 2007 when he led the baseball team to back-to-back national championships
- Slats Gill, former OSU basketball coach and member of the Naismith Memorial Basketball Hall of Fame
- Corinne Manogue, physicist, best known for clarifying superradiance in both gravitational and electromagnetic contexts
- Tevian Dray, mathematician, co-author of scientific paper "On the existence of solutions to Einstein's equation with nonzero Bondi news"
- Ralph Miller, former OSU basketball coach and member of the Naismith Memorial Basketball Hall of Fame
- Dana Reason, director of the Popular Music Studies Program and acclaimed Canadian pianist and composer
- James Cassidy, soil scientist, bassist and keyboard player for Information Society
- Craig Robinson, former OSU head basketball coach and the brother-in-law of President Barack Obama
- Bernadine Strik (1962–2023), horticulturist.

=== Alumni ===
Oregon State University has over 200,000 alumni, including scientist and peace activist Linus Pauling. Pauling is the only recipient of two unshared Nobel Prizes, in the fields of chemistry and peace. Other notable alumni include Jensen Huang, founder of Nvidia. Oregon State athletes have had a significant showing in professional sports, including more than 15 MLB players, more than 20 NBA players and more than 130 NFL players.

Notable Oregon State University alumni include:

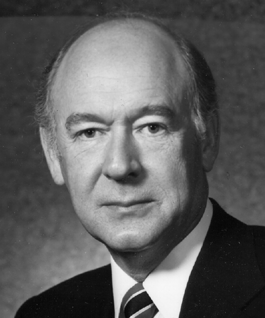
Cecil D. Andrus
Former Governor of Idaho
U.S. Secretary of the Interior

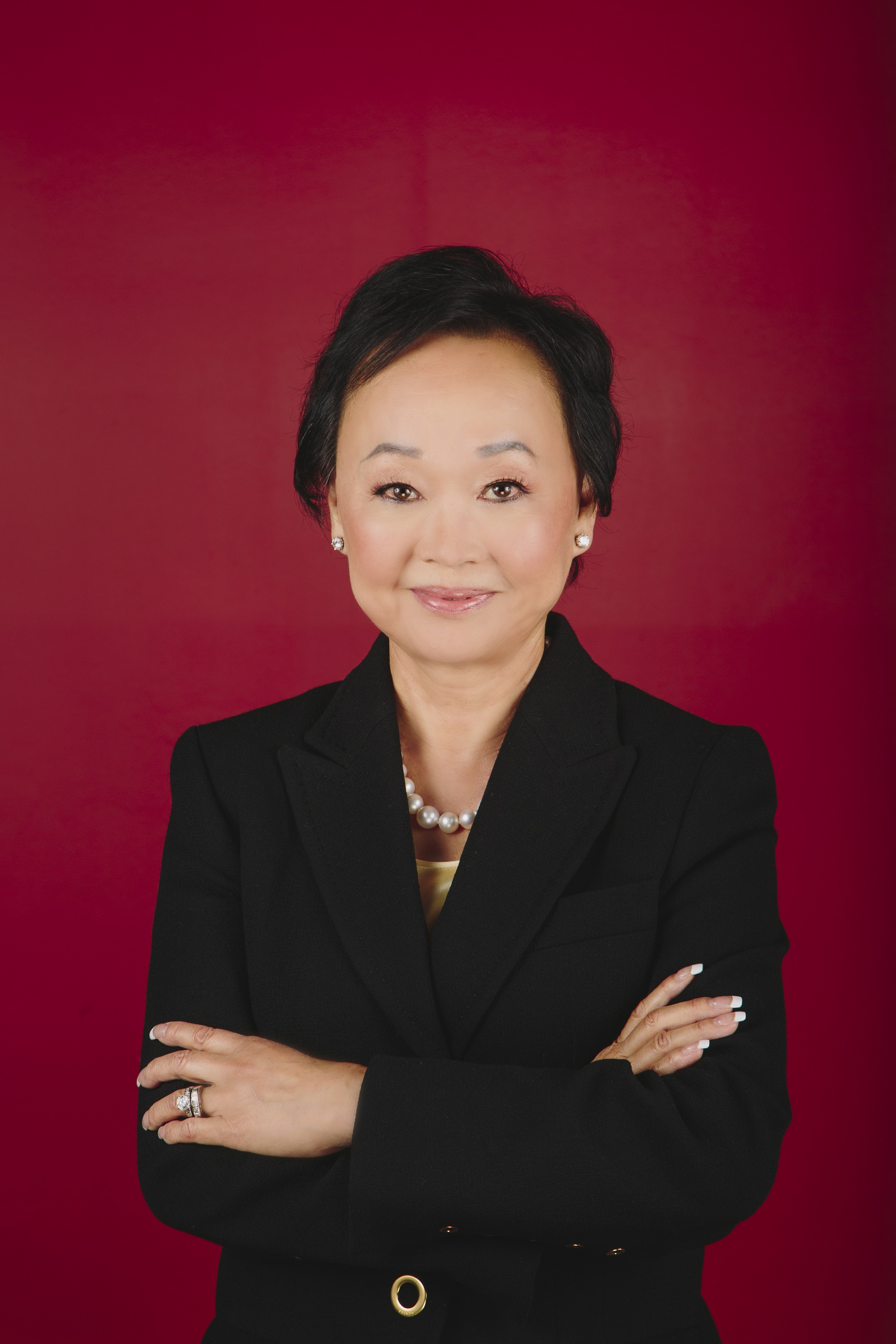
Peggy Cherng
Co-founder & CEO of
Panda Express

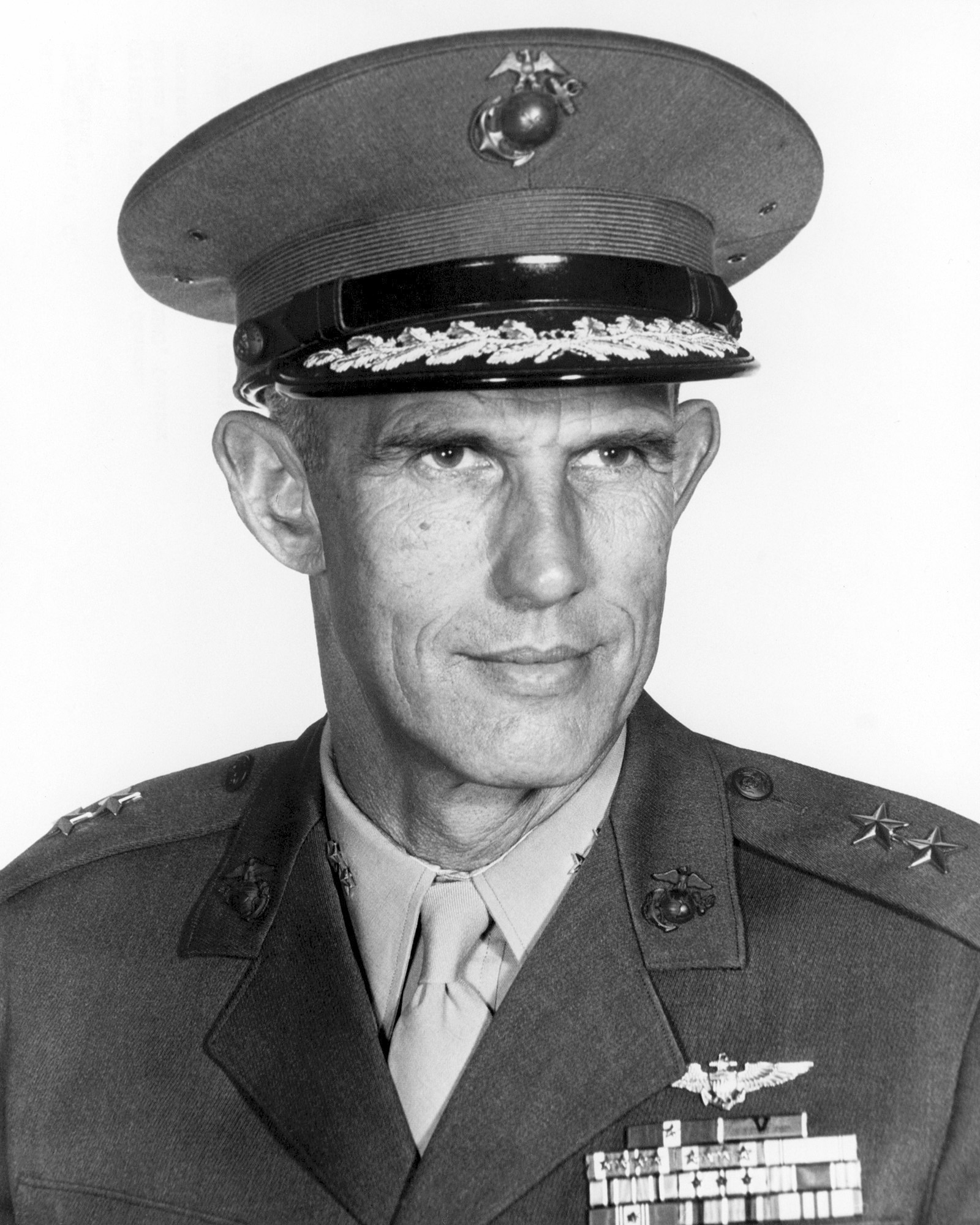
Marion Eugene Carl
Former Inspector General of the Marine Corps
World War II fighter ace, record test pilot

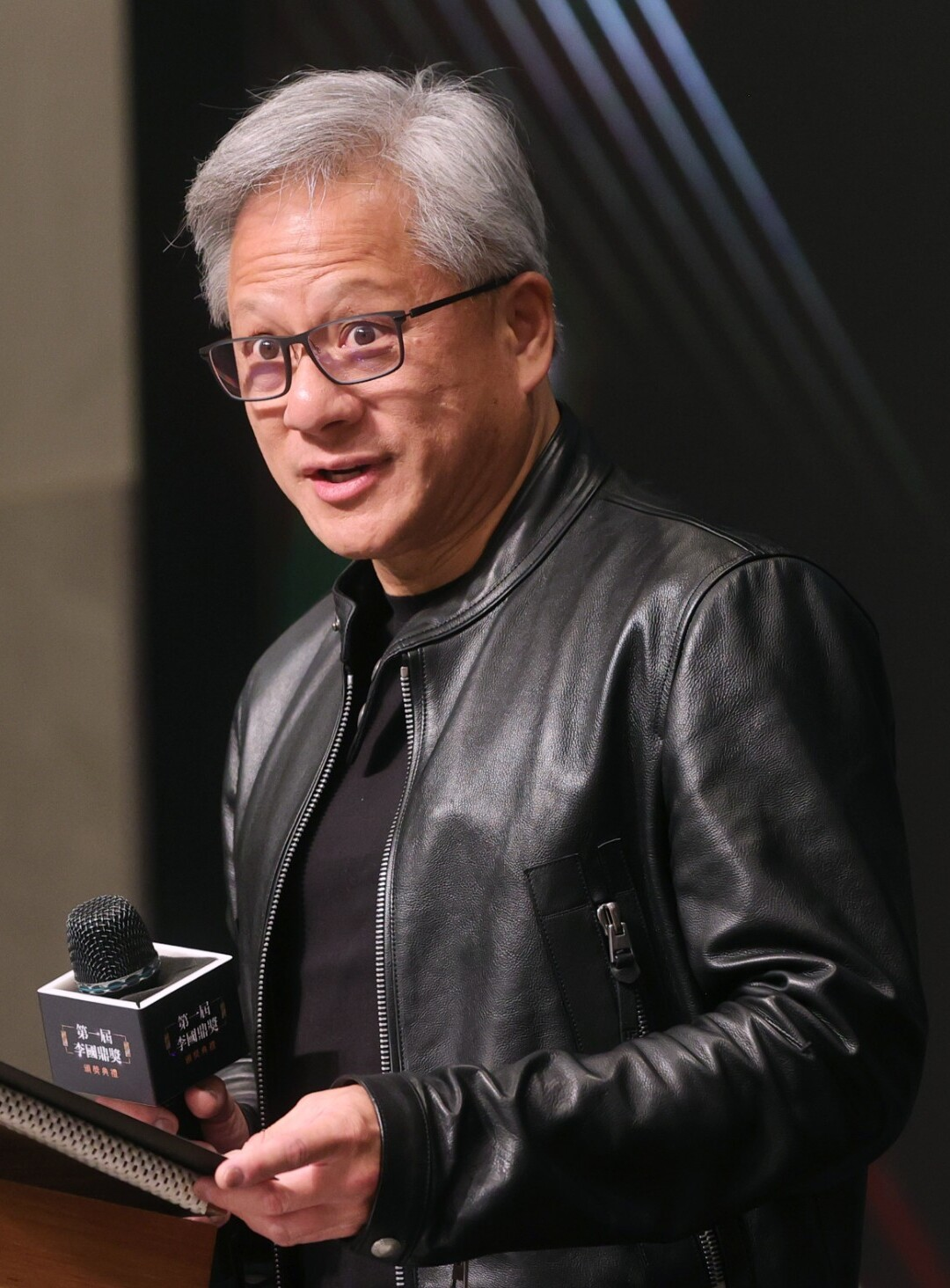
Jensen Huang
Co-founder of NVIDIA

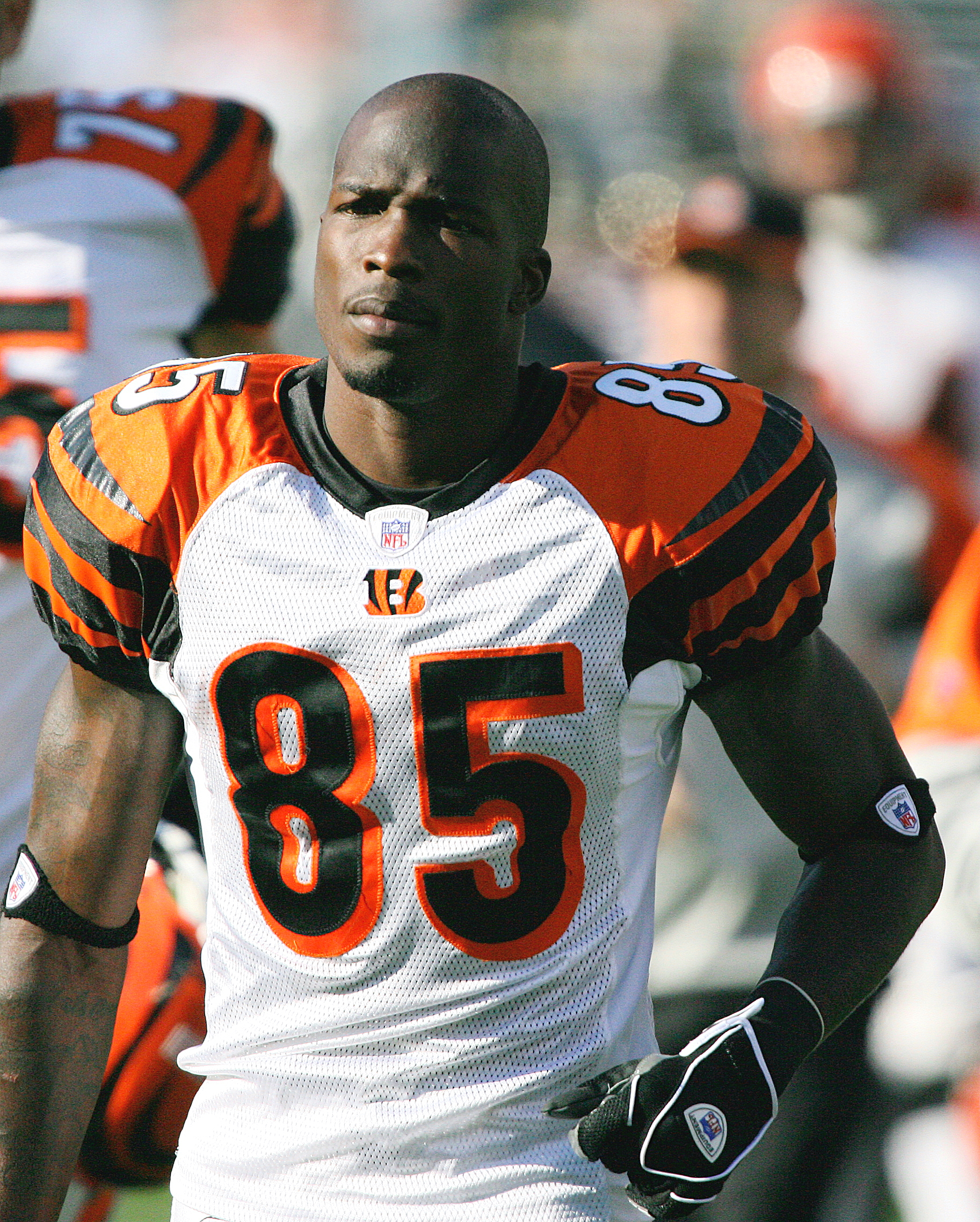
Chad Johnson
6× Pro Bowl wide receiver

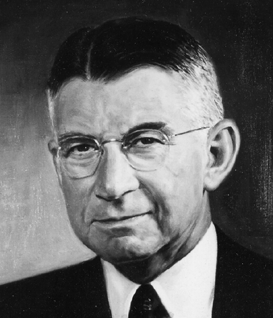
Douglas McKay
Former Governor of Oregon
& U.S. Secretary of the Interior

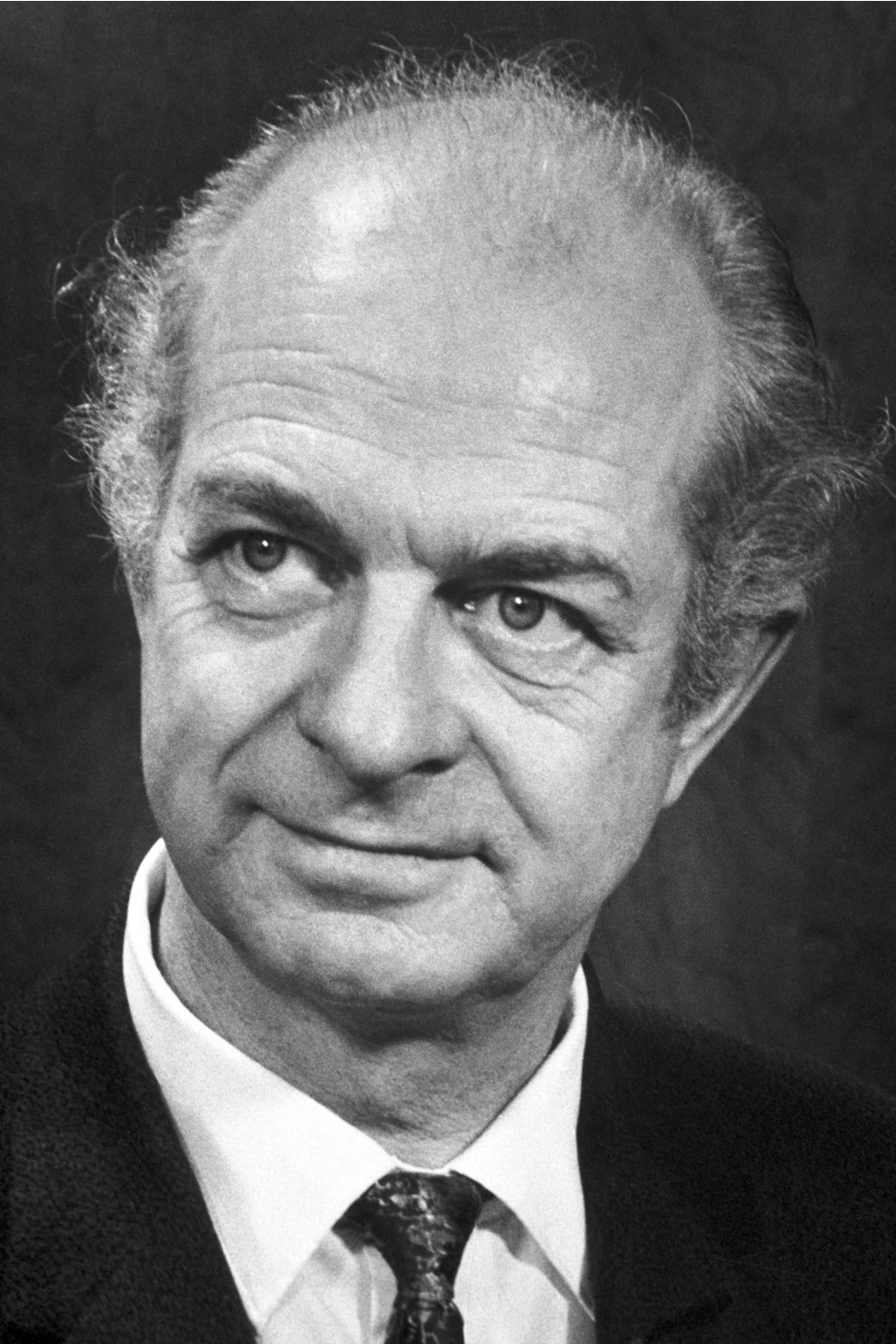
Linus Pauling
2× Nobel laureate
(Chemistry & Peace)

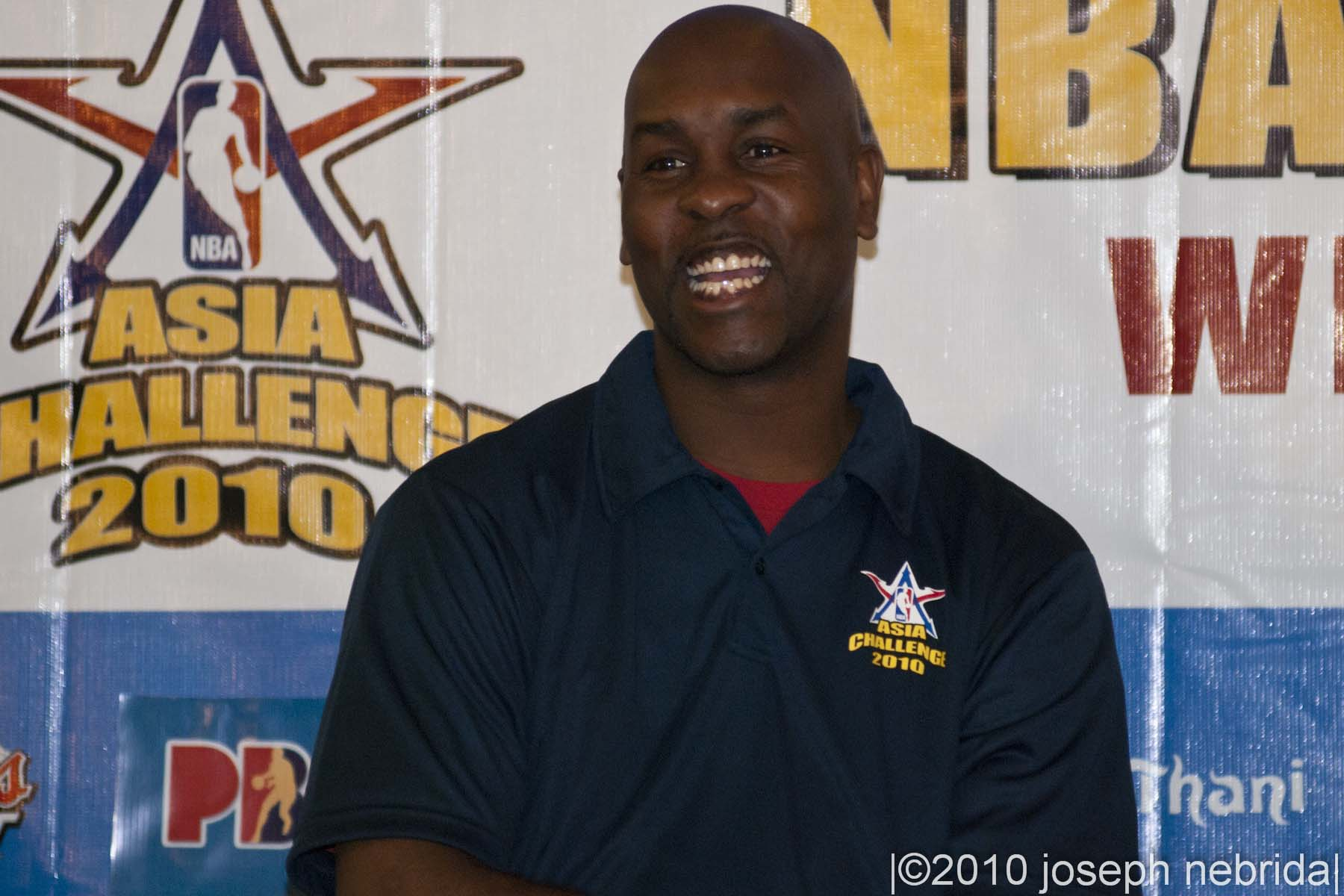
Gary Payton
NBA Hall of Famer

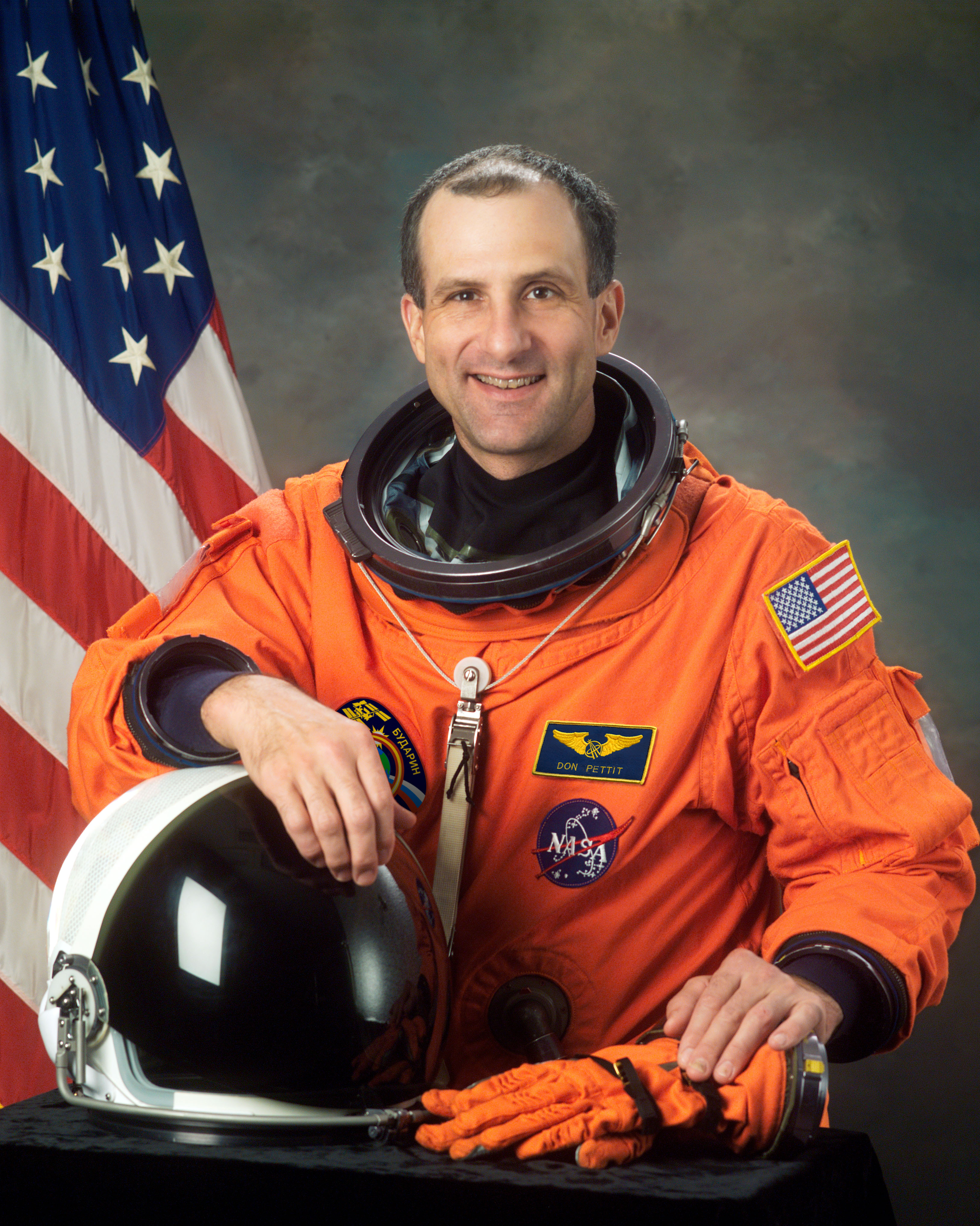
Donald Pettit
NASA astronaut

== Points of interest ==
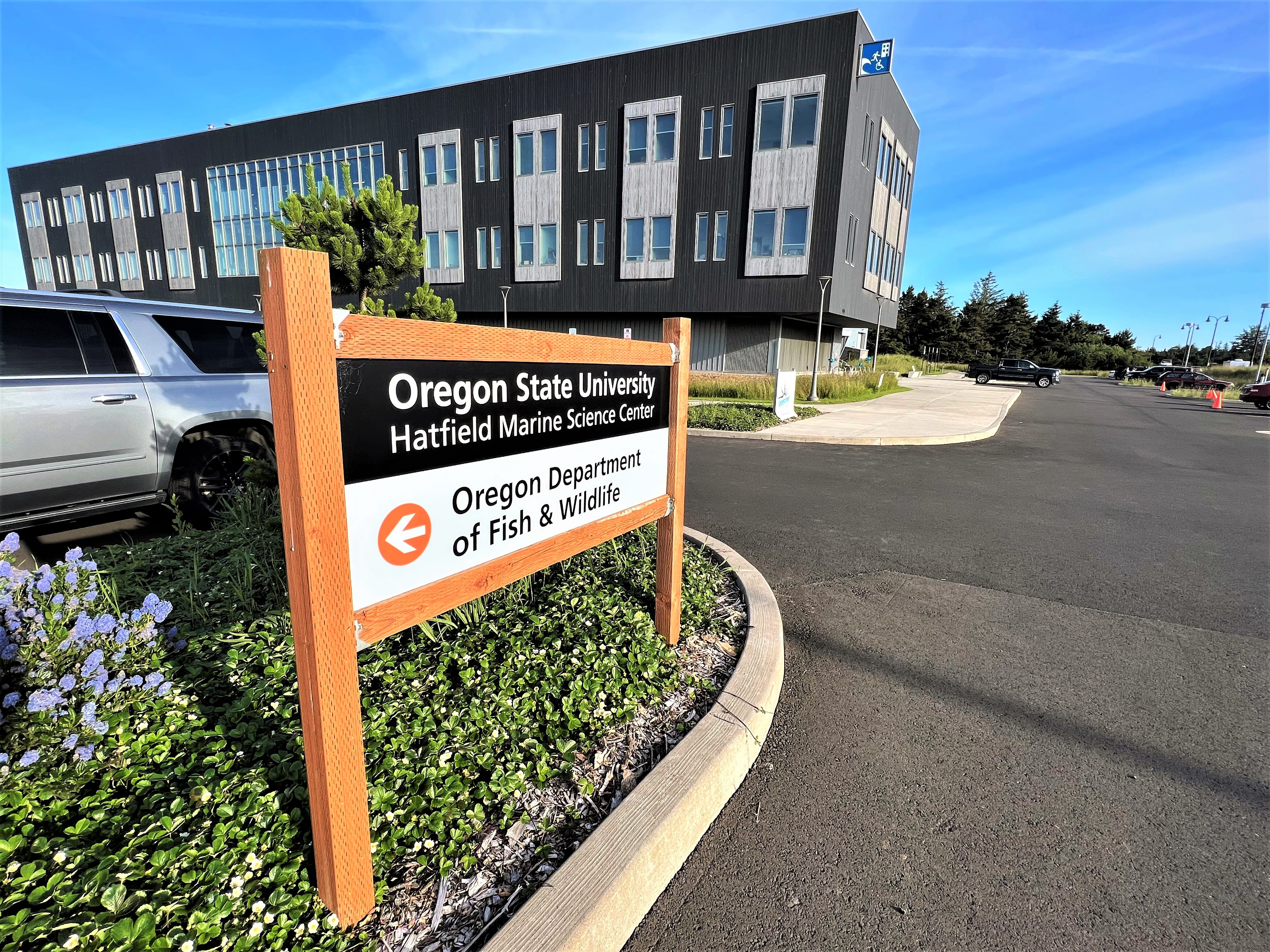
Hatfield Marine Science Center in Newport, 2022

- Endurance Array
- Hatfield Marine Science Center
- Linus Pauling Institute
- O. H. Hinsdale Wave Research Laboratory
- Oregon State University Cascades Campus
- Oregon State University Radiation Center
- Peavy Arboretum
