= Oregon State Wireless Active Learning Device =

The Oregon State Wireless Active Learning Device (OSWALD) is an open source learning platform developed by students of the Oregon State University to allow undergraduate students of computer science to obtain first experiences through direct technical contribution.

The device is capable of common tasks such as browsing through the internet, instant messaging and playback of multimedia content. It can also support Java and USB.

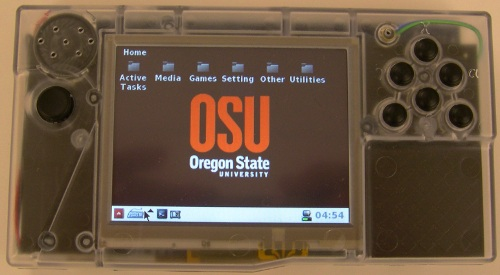
OSWALD seen from the front after booting.

== Software ==
=== Operating system ===
The kernel of the system is Linux-based. Any software needs to be built by the students themselves through a compilation of BitBake recipes which are managed by OpenEmbedded. The installation requires a correctly formatted SD card containing the bootable build.

=== Java ===
OSWALD is capable of running Java code. Java files can be compiled on the device or delivered as compiled .class files. A network access can be established through standard Sockets and ServerSockets, since the wireless interface supports IP.

== Hardware ==
The systems main processor is the Texas Instruments OMAP3530 running with 500 MHz. The graphics processor is the PowerVR SGX530 for 2D and 3D graphics. Physical space is limited by 128 Mbyte DDR-SDRAM with a clock speed of 266 MHz. There is also a 256 Mbyte NAND flash memory. The display is a resistive touchscreen having a DVI out with a resolution of 1024x768 (HD). Speakers are the Texas Instruments TLV320AIC33 stereo.

The touch screen, buttons and a built in accelerometer are handled via microcontrollers that contain software. The Cypress CY8C24794 handles the controls of the touchpad and button inputs. The Atmel ATMega48 monitors the accelerometer. A Texas Instruments CC2431 is used as a wireless interface (802.15.4 wireless supported).
