= Lonnie B. Harris Black Cultural Center =

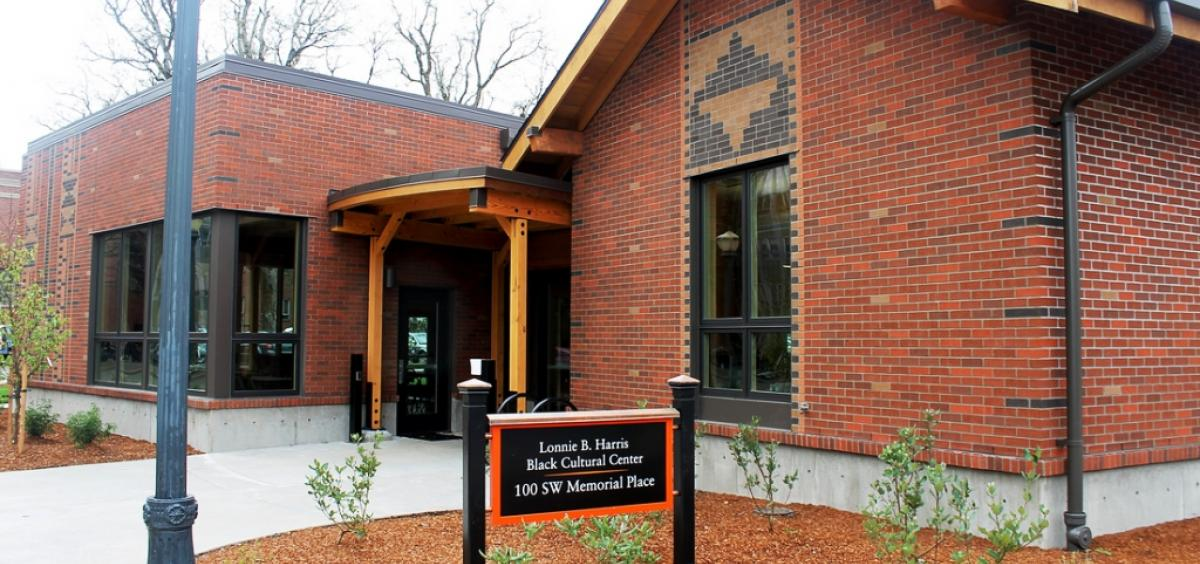
- Interactive map of the Lonnie B. Harris Black Cultural Center area
- Former names: Black Student Union Cultural Center

General information
- Location: Oregon State University, Corvallis Campus, 100 SW Memorial Place Corvallis, OR 97331

44.568453°N 123.2804603°W

The Lonnie B. Harris Black Cultural Center is a cultural center located at Oregon State University.

== History ==
Three years after the creation of the Office of Minority Affairs in 1970, the Oregon State University's Black Student Union opened a Black Student Union Cultural Center that was later renamed the Lonnie B. Harris Cultural Center in 1999.

The Black Student Union was threatening to leave OSU after repeated discrimination and so action was needed. The university opened several cultural centers around this time including the Native American Longhouse in 1971 and the Hispanic Cultural Center in 1976.

The center opened on April 26, 1975. In 1976, a cross was burned in front of the center. Upon questioning, the culprits said that the action was a "prank which got out of hand." While this action was undoubtedly one with deep historical roots associated with white supremacy, African American campus leaders met with the culprit and asked for leniency regarding his punishment."

=== Lonnie B. Harris ===
Lonnie B. Harris was the first director of the Educational Opportunities Program who sought to help "increase the recruitment and retention of black students at OSU."

=== Oregon State University Black Student Union ===
After an Oregon State University football player was kicked off the team in 1969 for refusing to shave his afro and sideburns, the Black students on campus were irate. 47 Black students staged a walkout immediately resulting in various talks that led to the formation of the Black Student Union.

== Architecture ==
The Lonnie B. Harris Black Cultural Center was temporarily moved to Snell Hall as a new location was being rebuilt in 2013.

== Location ==
100 SW Memorial Place Corvallis, OR 97331
