= Community Hall (Oregon State University) =

Building on Oregon State University campus

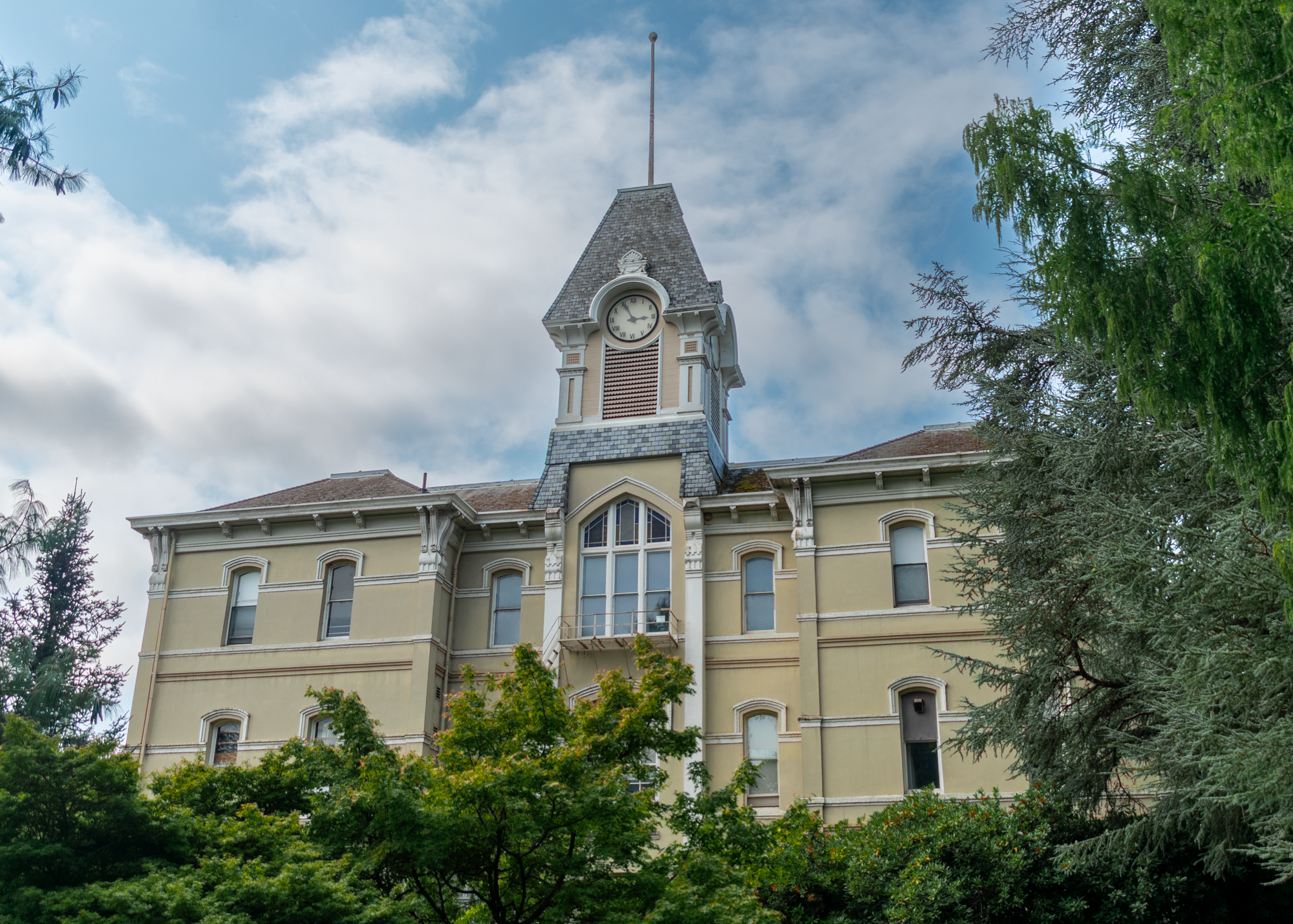
- Community Hall exterior in 2025
- Location of Community Hall Interactive map of the Community Hall area
- Former names: Administration Bldg. (1888–1947); Benton Hall (1947–2017)

General information
- Status: Completed
- Type: School
- Architectural style: Beaux-Arts
- Location: College Hill, 1650 SW Pioneer Place, Corvallis, Oregon, United States
- Coordinates: 44.5662°N 123.2743°W
- Elevation: 240 ft (73 m)
- Current tenants: University music department
- Named for: The community of Benton Co. which funded its construction; Formerly: Thomas Hart Benton, U.S. Senator 1821-51 (D-MO)
- Groundbreaking: August 17, 1887 (138 years ago)
- Completed: July 1888
- Opened: September 1889
- Cost: $25,000
- Owner: Oregon State University

Technical details
- Structural system: Heavy timber-framed
- Material: Wood
- Floor count: 3
- Floor area: 25,806 sq ft (2,397 m^{2})
- Lifts/elevators: 1

Design and construction
- Architect: Wilbur R. Boothby
- Other designers: Edgar M. Lazarus (1899 changes)

Other information
- Parking: 25 standard + 4 disabled spaces

Website
- events.oregonstate.edu/community_hall
- Community Hall (Oregon State University)
- U.S. Historic district – Contributing property
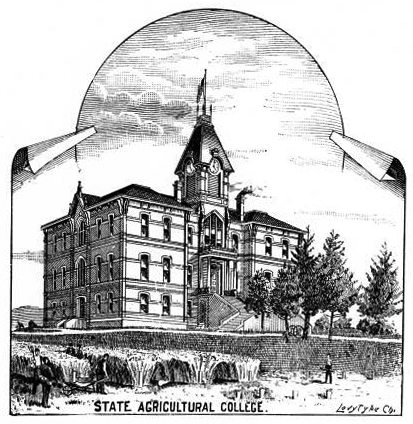
- Etching of Community Hall used in class catalogs in this format in 1889-90 and 1890-91

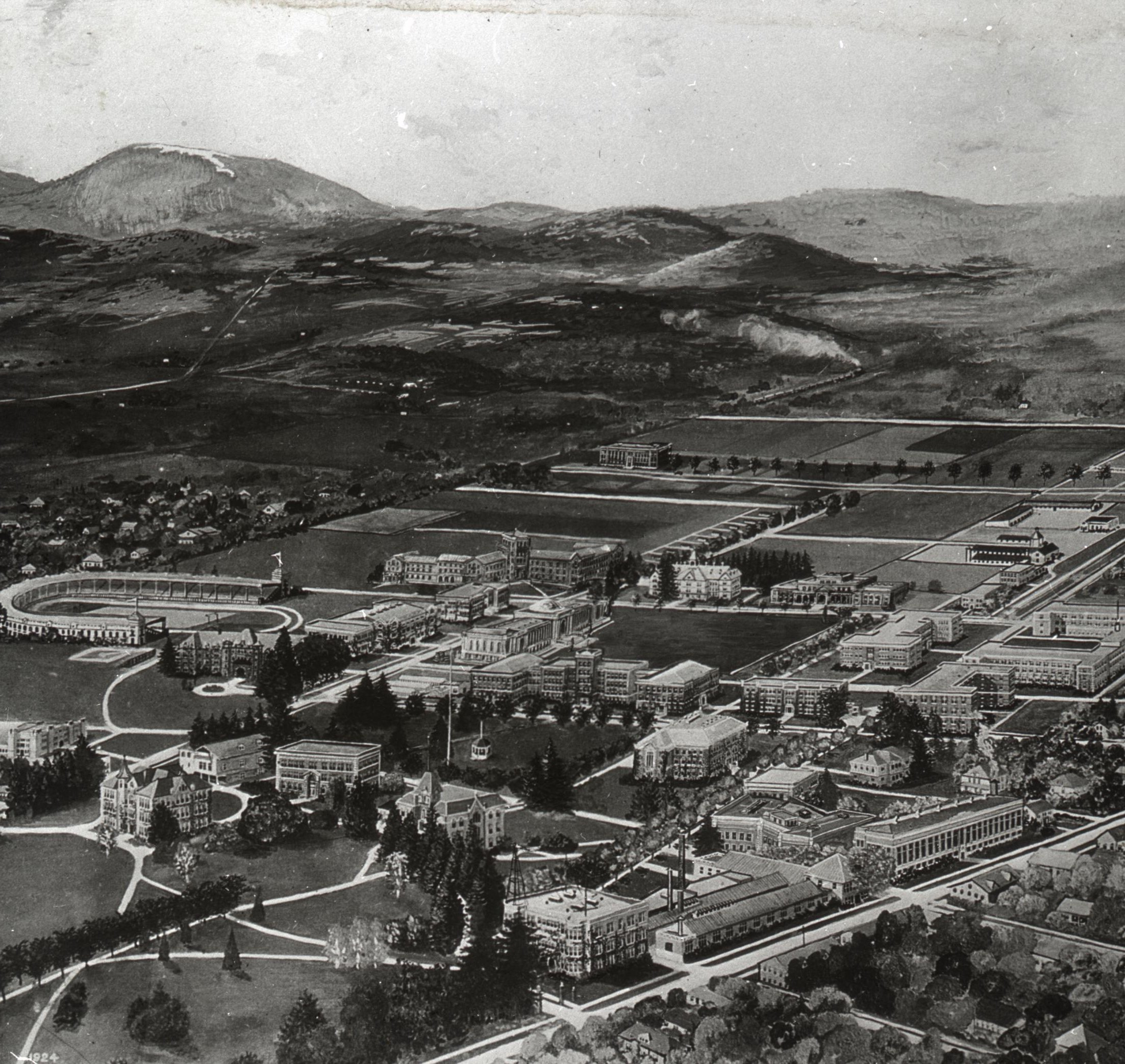
- 1915 aerial view of campus with Community Hall shown in the foreground, slightly left of center
- Location: SW Campus Way and SW Pioneer Place, Corvallis
- Coordinates: 44.5662°N 123.2743°W
- Part of: Oregon State University Historic District (ID08000546)
- Designated CP: June 25, 2008

Community Hall (formerly the Administration Building, then Benton Hall) was the first building constructed on the Oregon State University campus in Corvallis, Oregon and the oldest structure on its campus today. Its original name was simply the "Administration Building" while the university itself was using the name under which it was first organized: Oregon State Agricultural College. It is situated on a gentle slope called "College Hill," just west of the city's commercial center on the west bank of the Willamette River, there anchoring what remains of the school's original buildings on the "Lower Campus" (given with current names and years built): Apperson Hall (1899), Benton Annex (1892), Education Hall (1902) and Gladys Valley Gymnastics Center (1898).

== History ==
In 1860 a lien was placed on the first building to occupy the site, by a carpenter who had not been paid for his work. The ensuing sheriff's sale resulted in ownership of the building, the land and the school operating there (Corvallis College) transferring to Rev. Orceneth Fisher on behalf of the Methodist Episcopal Church South, where he served as pastor. By 1885, calls from local leaders were growing loud to convert it to a state institution which would be eligible for federal funds under the Morrill Land-Grant Acts and the church agreed to relinquish control. In response, the Oregon State Legislature passed an act that reorganized the school as the state's agricultural college, but skeptical of the actual awarding of land-grant status it decided to require the citizens of Benton County to bear the full costs for the construction of a suitable building to house its offices, which the act required to be no less than $25,000 (equivalent to $675,000 in 2020), and if successful the building would become de jure property of the state upon completion through eminent domain.

The 1880 census had reported only 1,400 households within the entire county, but less than two years later the sum had been raised, permits secured and construction began on the building still standing today, largely unchanged, as Community Hall. The cornerstone was laid by the Ancient Free and Accepted Masons of Oregon on August 17, 1887 and it officially opened in September 1889 at the start of the school's final academic year as the State Agricultural College of Oregon; it opened for the 1890 term as simply the Oregon Agricultural College.

On October 28, 1987, Governor Neil Goldschmidt signed a proclamation declaring the day as "Benton Hall Day".

Benton Hall was renamed Community Hall in November 2017.
