= 2020 Milwaukee County Executive election =

- April 7, 2020
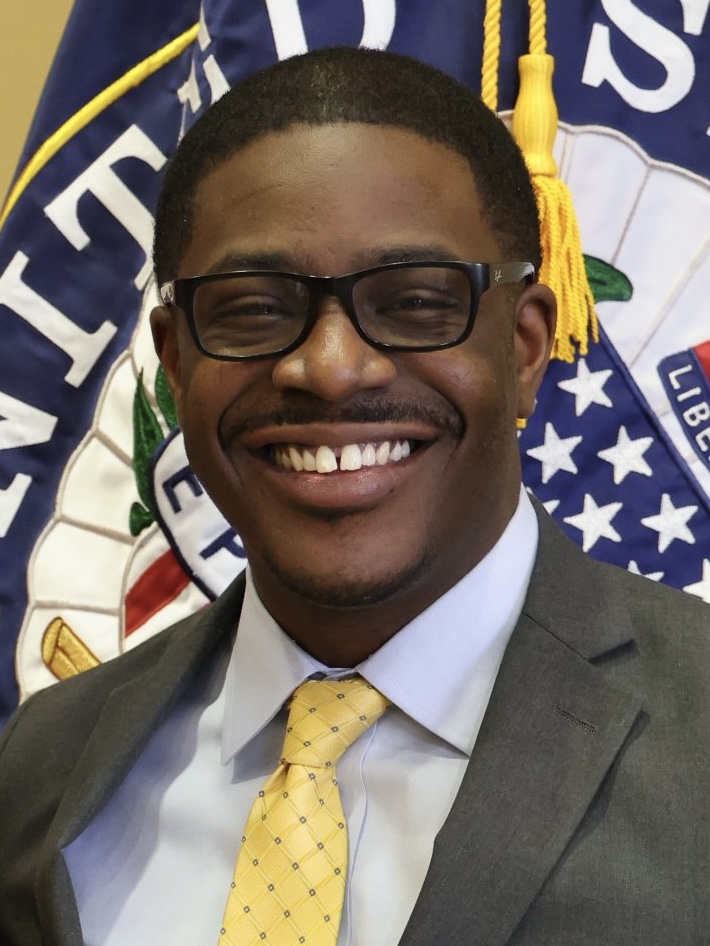

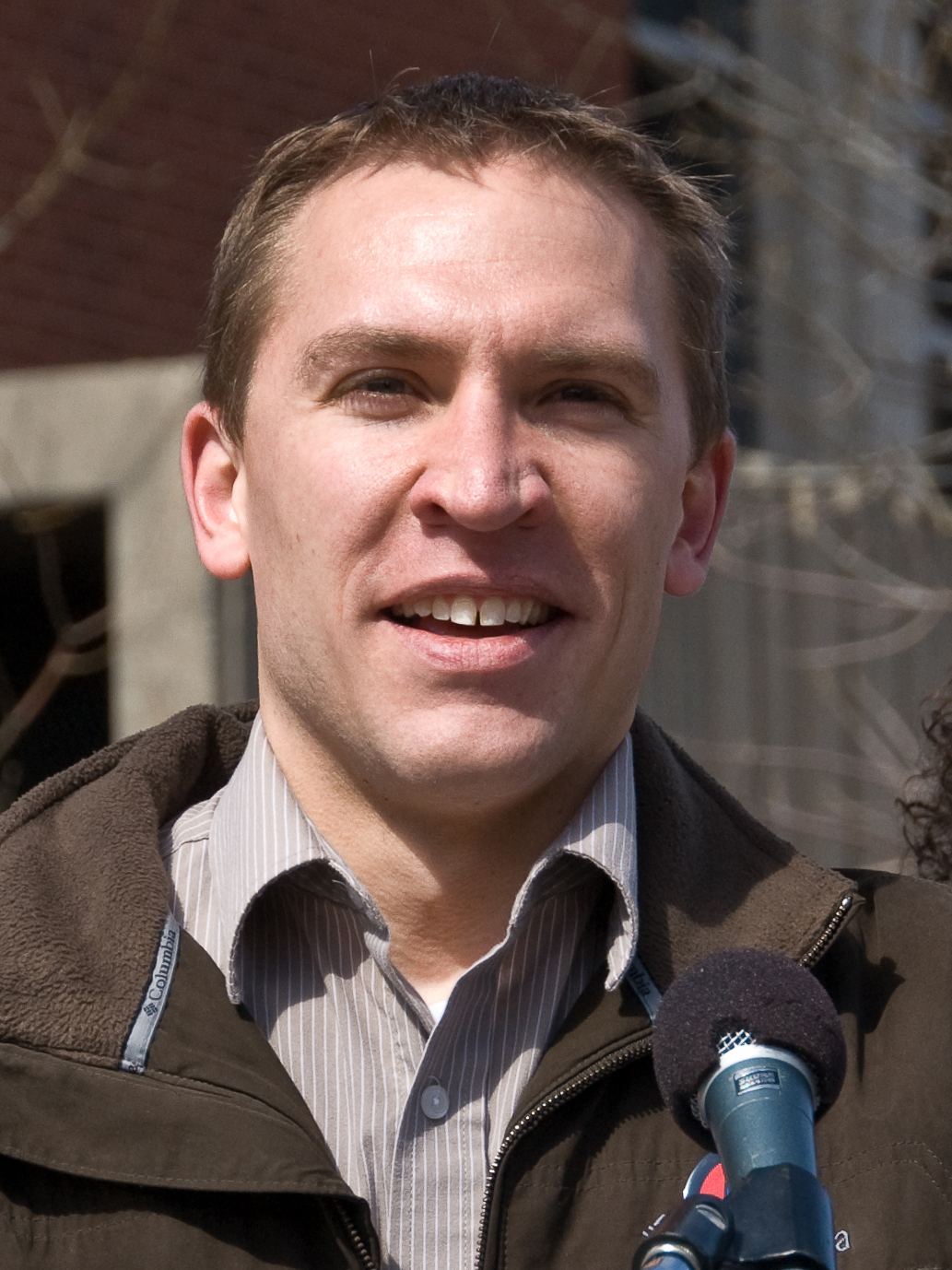
Candidate	David Crowley	Chris Larson
Popular vote	96,714	95,688
Percentage	50.05%	49.52%
County Executive before election
Chris Abele
Nonpartisan
Elected County Executive
David Crowley
Nonpartisan

The 2020 Milwaukee County executive election took place on April 7, 2020, following a primary election on February 18, 2020. Incumbent County Executive Chris Abele initially announced on May 14, 2019, that he would seek re-election to a third full term, but on October 16, announced that he would not do so.

A crowded field developed to succeed Abele, with State Senator Chris Larson, State Representative David Crowley, former State Senator Jim Sullivan, County Board of Supervisors Chairman Theodore Lipscomb, and Glendale Mayor Bryan Kennedy announcing their campaigns. Lipscomb challenged Kennedy's and Sullivan's nomination papers, arguing that they were legally insufficient. The Wisconsin Elections Commission agreed that their nomination papers were insufficient and ordered them removed from the ballot, a decision that was affirmed by the Milwaukee County Circuit Court and the Wisconsin Court of Appeals.

In the primary election, Larson and Crowley placed first and second, winning 36 and 34 percent of the vote, respectively, and advanced to the general election. Crowley ended up narrowly defeating Larson by a 1,026-vote margin, winning 50 percent of the vote. Larson ultimately declined to seek a recount and conceded to Crowley.

== Primary election ==
=== Candidates ===
- David Crowley, state representative
- Chris Larson, state senator, 2016 candidate for county executive
- Theodore Lipscomb, chairman of the County Board of Supervisors
- Purnima Nath, nonprofit executive

==== Disqualified ====
- Bryan Kennedy, mayor of Glendale
- Jim Sullivan, director of County Child Support Services, former state senator, 2011 candidate for county executive

=== Results ===
Primary election results
Party	Candidate	Votes	%
Nonpartisan	Chris Larson	42,154	36.34%
Nonpartisan	David Crowley	39,757	34.27%
Nonpartisan	Theodore Lipscomb	19,252	16.60%
Nonpartisan	Purnima Nath	14,217	12.26%
Write-in		624	0.54%
Total votes		116,004	100.00%

== General election ==
=== Results ===
2020 Milwaukee County executive election results
Party	Candidate	Votes	%
Nonpartisan	David Crowley	96,714	50.05%
Nonpartisan	Chris Larson	95,688	49.52%
Write-in		837	0.43%
Total votes		193,239	100.00%
