= 2024 Milwaukee County Executive election =

- April 2, 2024
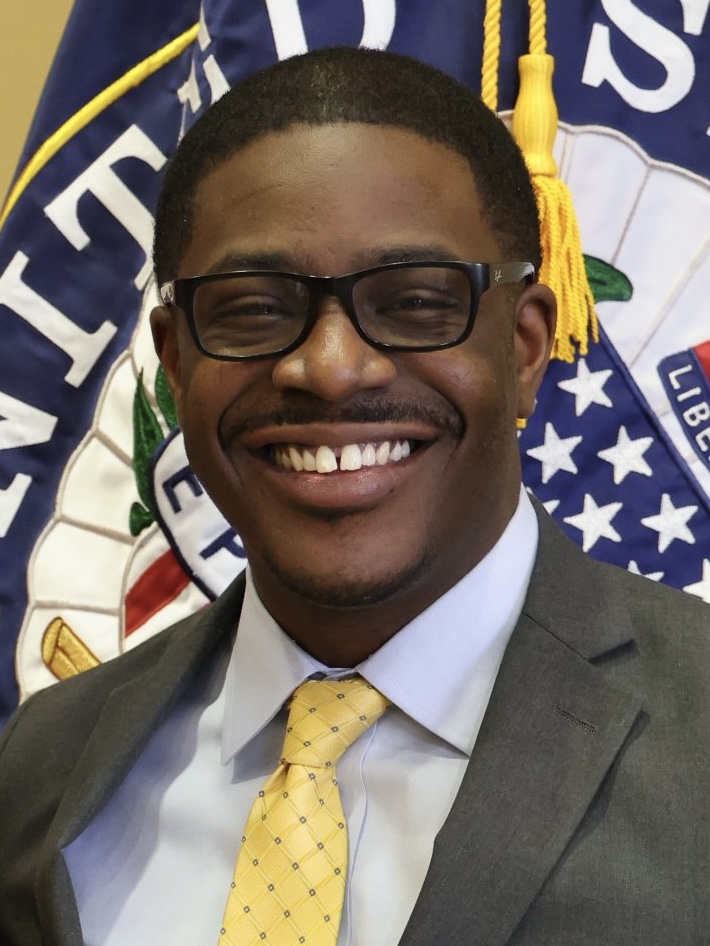

Candidate	David Crowley	Ieshuh Griffin
Party	Nonpartisan	Nonpartisan
Popular vote	116,934	20,614
Percentage	84.52%	14.90%
County Executive before election
David Crowley
Nonpartisan
Elected County Executive
David Crowley
Nonpartisan

The 2024 Milwaukee County Executive election took place on April 2, 2024. Incumbent County Executive David Crowley ran for re-election to a second term. His only opponent was activist and perennial candidate Ieshuh Griffin. Because only two candidates filed for the election, no primary election was held. Crowley defeated Griffin in a landslide, winning re-election with 85 percent of the vote.

== General election ==
=== Candidates ===
- David Crowley, incumbent County Executive
- Ieshuh Griffin, activist, perennial candidate

=== Results ===
2024 Milwaukee County Executive election results
Party	Candidate	Votes	%
Nonpartisan	David Crowley (inc.)	116,934	84.52%
Nonpartisan	Ieshuh Griffin	20,614	14.90%
Write-in		798	0.58%
Total votes		138,346	100.00%
