= Theodore Lipscomb =

American politician

Theodore Lipscomb, Sr. is a Wisconsin politician and the chairman of the Milwaukee County Board of Supervisors. Lipscomb was first elected to the County Board in 2008, representing Milwaukee County's 1st district.

== Life and career ==
Lipscomb is the son of former state legislator Mark Lipscomb, Jr., a Democrat and unicameralist known for his attempt to sit in both the Wisconsin Senate and Wisconsin Assembly. The younger Lipscomb graduated from Marquette University High School and from the University of Wisconsin–Milwaukee School of Architecture and Urban Planning before working for an architectural firm and in the nonprofit sector.

== Public office ==
In April 2008, Lipscomb challenged County Supervisor James G. White in a write-in candidacy; White also ran as a write-in candidate, having failed to meet statutory requirements to be listed on the ballot. Lipscomb defeated White and was reelected to the County Board in 2012. Lipscomb was considered a progressive and a political opponent of moderate County Executive Chris Abele.

Upon the resignation of County Board Chairwoman Marina Dimitrijevic in July 2015, Lipscomb entered the race to replace her. He was elected board chairman on July 30, defeating County Supervisor Willie Johnson, Jr.

Lipscomb did not seek re-election in 2020, but ran for Milwaukee County Executive, losing the non-partisan primary on February 18, with 19,252 votes to 42,154 for Chris Larson, 39,757 for eventual winner David Crowley, and 14,217 for Purnima Nath. He left office on April 20, 2020.

== After the County Board ==
In July 2020, he became Executive Director of the local office of the Local Initiatives Support Corporation, a non-profit organization management organization.
