= David Crowley =

Governor-elect of Wisconsin (born 1986)

- Crowley in 2026

Governor-elect of Wisconsin
- Assuming office January 4, 2027
- Lieutenant: Sarah Godlewski (elect)
- Succeeding: Tony Evers

7th Executive of Milwaukee County
- Incumbent
- Assumed office May 4, 2020
- Preceded by: Chris Abele

Member of the Wisconsin State Assembly from the 17th district
- In office January 3, 2017 – June 18, 2020
- Preceded by: LaTonya Johnson
- Succeeded by: Supreme Moore Omokunde

Personal details
- Born: David Carl Crowley; May 14, 1986 (age 40) Milwaukee, Wisconsin, U.S.
- Party: Democratic
- Spouse: Ericka Wright (m. 2016)
- Children: 3
- Education: University of Wisconsin, Milwaukee (BS)
- Website: Official website; Campaign website

David Carl Crowley (/ˈkraʊli/; born May 14, 1986) is an American politician who is the governor-elect of Wisconsin. A member of the Democratic Party, he is the first African American to be elected governor of Wisconsin.

Crowley has served since 2020 as the seventh executive of Milwaukee County, and served two terms in the Wisconsin State Assembly, representing Milwaukee's west side from 2017 to 2020. He was the first African-American to serve as Milwaukee County's top official and the youngest person elected to that office, having taken office in May 2020 at age 33.

Crowley won the 2026 Wisconsin gubernatorial election after a noteworthy comeback in the Democratic Party primary, defeating state representative Francesca Hong by 0.48 percentage points after suspending his campaign in July and reentering the race 24 days before the August 11 primary. He was endorsed by the incumbent governor, Tony Evers, and defeated the Republican nominee, U.S. representative Tom Tiffany, in the general election.

== Early life, family, and education ==
Crowley was born on May 14, 1986, in Milwaukee, Wisconsin. Crowley's parents struggled with drug addiction during his childhood, and the family lost their home when he was 10 years old. His parents eventually divorced. Crowley was evicted from two more homes before graduating from high school.

Crowley graduated from Bay View High School, and first attended the University of Wisconsin–Milwaukee in 2006, leaving during his first semester and returning intermittently in later years. Under the mentorship of Reggie and Sharlen Moore and their community organizing group Urban Underground, as well as serving as a Public Ally and working with individuals impacted by the justice system at the nonprofit Project RETURN, Crowley became interested in issues of policing and local government.

Crowley resumed his undergraduate studies while serving as county executive and earned a bachelor's degree in community engagement and education from the University of Wisconsin–Milwaukee in December 2024, delivering the commencement address at his graduation ceremony.

== Early political career ==
While attending college, Crowley began working in politics as a campaign organizer for U.S. Senator Russ Feingold's 2010 re-election campaign. After the election, he took a job as a legislative aide to Milwaukee County supervisor Nikiya Harris Dodd. When Harris Dodd was elected to the Wisconsin Senate in 2012, Crowley suspended his education to work as her policy director at the Wisconsin State Capitol in Madison, Wisconsin.

Crowley made his first attempt at elected office in 2016, when he ran for a seat on the Milwaukee Common Council. He came in third in the February nonpartisan primary election and did not advance to the general election. Later that month, his employer, Nikiya Harris Dodd, announced she would not seek re-election in Wisconsin's 6th Senate district. The move prompted Assembly member La Tonya Johnson to declare for that office, creating an open race in the 17th Assembly district. Crowley entered the race and won the Democratic primary with 56% of the vote. He was unopposed in the general election and entered office on January 3, 2017. He was re-elected in 2018.

== Milwaukee County executive (2020–present) ==
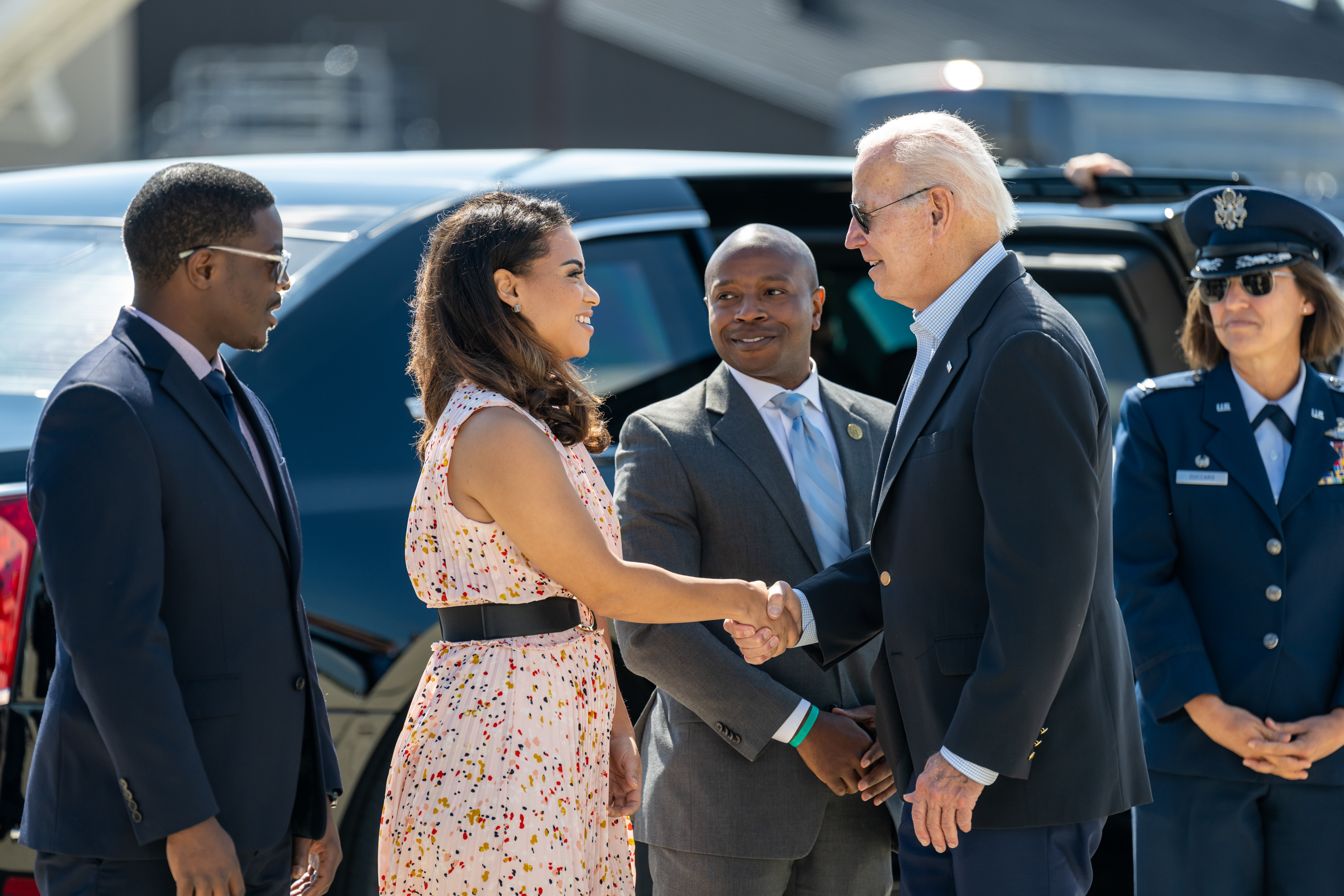
Crowley (furthest at left) greeting President Joe Biden with Milwaukee mayor Cavalier Johnson and others in 2022

In November 2019, after incumbent Chris Abele announced he would not seek re-election, Crowley announced his candidacy for Milwaukee County executive. In the February primary election, Crowley came in a close second to state senator Chris Larson, defeating county board chairman Theodore Lipscomb and businesswoman Purnima Nath. Crowley received the endorsement of outgoing executive Chris Abele, who had been challenged by Larson for the office in 2016. Abele went on to spend heavily on behalf of Crowley through his political action committee, Leadership MKE. The April election was significantly disrupted by the COVID-19 pandemic in Wisconsin. Crowley defeated Larson by 1,026 votes.

Crowley was sworn in as county executive on May 4, 2020, in the front yard of his home because of restrictions on public gatherings during the COVID-19 pandemic. He resigned his seat in the Assembly effective June 18, 2020, as required by a 2015 Wisconsin law prohibiting a person from simultaneously serving as a member of the legislature and a county executive.

As county executive, Crowley oversees an annual county budget of about $1.4 billion. When he took office, the county was already facing longstanding financial problems that were compounded by the COVID-19 pandemic. To address these problems, Crowley worked alongside organizations including the League of Wisconsin Municipalities, the Greater Milwaukee Committee, and the Wisconsin Counties Association to seek additional local revenue authority. He also lobbied Milwaukee mayor Cavalier Johnson, Democratic and Republican state legislators, and Governor Tony Evers in support of a state funding agreement. The resulting legislation, 2023 Wisconsin Act 12, authorized Milwaukee County to impose an additional 0.4-percentage-point sales tax. The County Board approved the increase in July 2023, raising the county sales tax from 0.5% to 0.9%, and Crowley signed it the following month. The tax took effect on January 1, 2024. County officials said the additional revenue was needed to address pension obligations and avoid further cuts to county services.

Crowley's other policies have addressed opioid addiction, housing affordability, and carbon emissions. In 2021, he signed legislation creating Right to Counsel Milwaukee, a program providing free legal representation to eligible residents facing eviction or foreclosure. In 2023, Crowley signed legislation distributing more than $11 million in opioid-settlement funds among 15 county programs, including treatment for people in the county correctional system and vending machines dispensing naloxone and fentanyl test strips. In April 2025, he signed Milwaukee County's Climate Action 2050 plan, which calls for net-zero carbon emissions from county operations by 2050.

In January 2021, Crowley was named to the Milwaukee Business Journal's "40 Under 40" class of 2021. He was re-elected in 2024, defeating perennial candidate Ieshuh Griffin with 84.5% of the vote.

== Governor of Wisconsin ==
=== 2026 election ===
In 2024, the Wisconsin political press began to speculate about whether Governor Tony Evers would run for a third term in the 2026 gubernatorial election; at that time, Crowley was named as one possible candidate to succeed him. Evers announced on July 24, 2025, that he would not seek re-election. Crowley announced the next day that he planned to run for governor.

Crowley formally launched his campaign for governor on September 9, 2025. He was endorsed the next day by Milwaukee mayor Cavalier Johnson. Crowley faced a crowded Democratic primary field that included Lieutenant Governor Sara Rodriguez, former lieutenant governor Mandela Barnes, state senator Kelda Roys, state representative Francesca Hong, former Wisconsin Department of Administration secretary Joel Brennan, and Missy Hughes, the former CEO of the Wisconsin Economic Development Corporation. In the first major campaign finance reports, covering the second half of 2025, Crowley reported raising about $789,000 and had about $602,000 cash on hand, putting him in the strongest financial position of any of the gubernatorial candidates at that point.

Despite his fundraising, Crowley struggled to gain support in opinion polls. A March 2026 Marquette University Law School poll found him at 3% among Democratic primary voters. At the Democratic Party of Wisconsin state convention in June, Crowley placed fourth in an informal straw poll, with 13% support from delegates. On June 22, Hughes suspended her campaign and endorsed Rodriguez, who had won the straw poll. Crowley announced on July 8 that he was suspending his campaign and formally endorsed Rodriguez the following day.

Days later, Rodriguez fired her campaign manager after discovering that her campaign had hundreds of thousands of dollars less cash on hand than expected. Rodriguez suspended her campaign on July 17, saying continuing problems with its financial reports would be a distraction. As the Rodriguez campaign was collapsing, the Milwaukee Journal Sentinel reported that the incumbent governor, Tony Evers, was "very seriously considering" a plan to bring Crowley back into the race. Hughes, who had previously dropped out and endorsed Rodriguez, tweeted "@DavidCCrowley get back in this race!" Crowley reentered the race on July 18; Evers endorsed Crowley the next day. A Marquette poll conducted from July 22 to 27 found Crowley at 7%, with 34% of Democratic primary voters undecided.

Barnes suspended his campaign on July 29, leaving Crowley, Hong, Brennan, and Roys as the only active candidates by the time of the August 11 primary. Taking to the campaign trail with Evers, Crowley blitzed across the state in the two weeks before the primary; his campaign also reported a surge in fundraising and a rush of new union endorsements.

Shortly after 3:00 a.m. on August 12, Crowley was declared the winner of the Democratic primary in what journalists and analysts called a "stunning comeback" and a "big upset". Crowley defeated Hong by about 3,700 votes, receiving about 39.8% of the statewide vote. Evers congratulated Crowley in the early hours of August 12, calling him "the future of our party". Crowley's win made him the first black man to be a major-party nominee for Wisconsin governor.

At the start of the general election, the Republican nominee, U.S. representative Tom Tiffany, sought to exploit apparent divisions in the Democratic Party over the issue of AI data centers—Hong had made a data center moratorium one of her premier policy proposals, whereas Crowley had resisted a moratorium, preferring to leave more authority in local control, and had suggested Wisconsin could become an "AI and data hub not only for the entire country, but for the entire globe". Several of Tiffany's early advertisements chided Crowley as "Data Center David Crowley", despite Tiffany's own record of voting for federal protections for data center projects. Ultimately, Crowley embraced a short-term data center moratorium in addition to his existing proposals for increased regulation of data center projects.

After the opening weeks, Tiffany's campaign shifted to more conventional Republican campaign playbook. He used "soft on crime" attacks against Crowley, attempting to repeat the successful tactics that had helped Republican senator Ron Johnson defeat Democratic nominee Mandela Barnes in the 2022 U.S. Senate election, and also incorporated immigrant crime attacks against Crowley, due to his opposition to warrantless ICE raids in Milwaukee County. Tiffany's campaign also attacked on the issue of taxes, claiming that Crowley had made the "largest property tax increase in Milwaukee history" and "doubled the county's sales tax".

Crowley attacked Tiffany on economic issues and his loyalty and deference to Donald Trump. He pointed to Tiffany's votes to support Trump policies—particularly tariffs and the 2026 Iran war—as driving an inflation crisis with higher energy and consumer prices. He warned that Tiffany was one of a handful of Republican members of Congress who had voted to reject the results of the 2020 United States presidential election and therefore could not be trusted to properly manage and certify the 2028 presidential election. Crowley also reminded voters of Tiffany's support for the controversial 2011 Wisconsin Act 10, which stripped unions of their rights in Wisconsin, and said that he planned to seek a repeal of the law.

Crowley ran on finally bringing Medicaid expansion to Wisconsin, noting that Wisconsin was one of only ten states that still refused to accept the expanded Medicaid funding. He also said he would push for an amendment to the state constitution to enshrine a right to abortion, and endorsed decriminalizing and taxing recreational cannabis in Wisconsin, noting that all of Wisconsin's neighbors had already decriminalized it and that the state was effectively ceding tax revenue to its neighbors by maintaining prohibition.

Crowley won the general election with 54% of the vote, the largest majority in a Wisconsin gubernatorial election since Tommy Thompson's fourth election in 1998, and the largest majority for a Democratic gubernatorial nominee since 1982. This was also the first time since 1962 that Wisconsin Democrats won a third consecutive gubernatorial election. Crowley is the first African American to be elected governor of Wisconsin.

== Personal life and family ==
Crowley married his wife, Ericka, in 2016; they have two daughters together, and Crowley is also the stepfather of a daughter from Ericka's previous relationship. Crowley has served as vice chair of the Milwaukee chapter of the American Civil Liberties Union. He has also served on the chapter's board. He is a member of Milwaukee Urban League Young Professionals and the Milwaukee NAACP.

Crowley's parents struggled with drug addiction. His mother, Valerie, died in 2023.

== Electoral history ==
=== Milwaukee Common Council (2016) ===
Milwaukee Common Council, District 7 Election, 2016
Party	Candidate	Votes	%	±%
Nonpartisan Primary, February 16, 2016
Nonpartisan	Khalif Rainey	1,351	31.51%	
Nonpartisan	Michael Bonds	1,116	26.03%	
Nonpartisan	David Crowley	962	22.44%	
Nonpartisan	Randy Jones	613	14.30%	
Nonpartisan	Vivian Redd-Fehr	228	5.32%	
	Scattering	17	0.40%	
Total votes		4,287	100.0%	

=== Wisconsin Assembly (2016, 2018) ===
Wisconsin Assembly, District 17 Election, 2016
Party	Candidate	Votes	%	±%
Democratic Primary, August 9, 2016
Democratic	David Crowley	3,303	56.48%	
Democratic	Kim Burns	1,635	27.96%	
Democratic	Marcus Hart	887	15.17%	
	Scattering	23	0.39%	
Plurality		1,668	28.52%	
Total votes		5,848	100.0%	
General Election, November 8, 2016
Democratic	David Crowley	21,715	99.07%	
	Scattering	204	0.93%	
Plurality		21,511	98.14%	
Total votes		21,919	100.0%	
Democratic hold				

=== Milwaukee County Executive (2020) ===
Milwaukee County Executive Election, 2020
Party	Candidate	Votes	%	±%
Nonpartisan Primary, February 18, 2020
Nonpartisan	Chris Larson	42,154	36.34%	
Nonpartisan	David Crowley	39,756	34.27%	
Nonpartisan	Theodore A. Lipscomb Sr.	19,252	16.60%	
Nonpartisan	Purnima Nath	14,218	12.26%	
	Scattering	624	0.54%	
Total votes		116,004	100.0%	
General Election, April 7, 2020
Nonpartisan	David Crowley	96,714	50.05%	
Nonpartisan	Chris Larson	95,688	49.52%	
	Doug Schmidt (write-in)	1	0.00%	
	Scattering	836	0.43%	
Plurality		1,026	0.53%	
Total votes		193,239	100.0%	-31.67%

=== Wisconsin Governor (2026) ===
Wisconsin Gubernatorial Election, 2026
Party	Candidate	Votes	%	±%
Democratic Primary, August 11, 2026
Democratic	David Crowley	315,413	39.81%	
Democratic	Francesca Hong	311,740	39.35%	
Democratic	Kelda Roys	59,394	7.50%	
Democratic	Joel Brennan	37,084	4.68%	
Democratic	Sara Rodriguez (withdrawn)	32,674	4.12%	
Democratic	Mandela Barnes (withdrawn)	32,435	4.09%	
Democratic	Missy Hughes (withdrawn)	3,230	0.41%	
Democratic	Brett Hulsey (write-in; withdrawn)	13	0.00%	
Democratic	Tim Reppen (write-in)	10	0.00%	
	Scattering	297	0.04%	
Plurality		3,673	0.46%	
Total votes		792,290	100.0%	+61.15%
General Election, November 3, 2026 (unofficial results)
Democratic	David Crowley	1,440,990	54.00%	+2.85pp
Republican	Tom Tiffany	1,227,674	46.00%	−1.75pp
Plurality		213,316	7.99%	+4.60pp
Total votes		2,668,664	100.0%	+0.46%
Democratic hold				

Party political offices
Preceded by Tony Evers	Democratic nominee for Governor of Wisconsin; 2026	Most recent
Political offices
Preceded by Chris Abele	Executive of Milwaukee County; 2020–present	Incumbent
Preceded by Tony Evers	Governor of Wisconsin; Taking office 2027	Elect
