= 2016 Milwaukee County Executive election =

- April 5, 2016
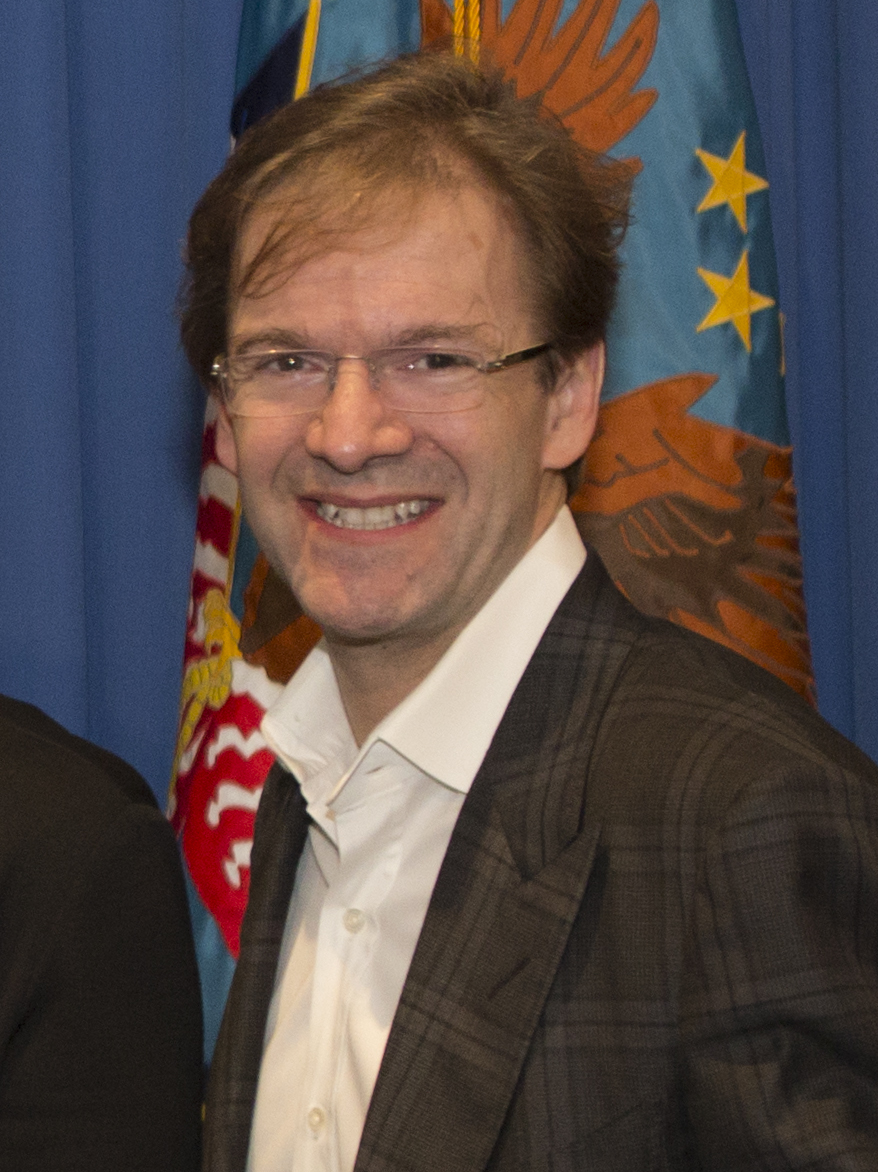

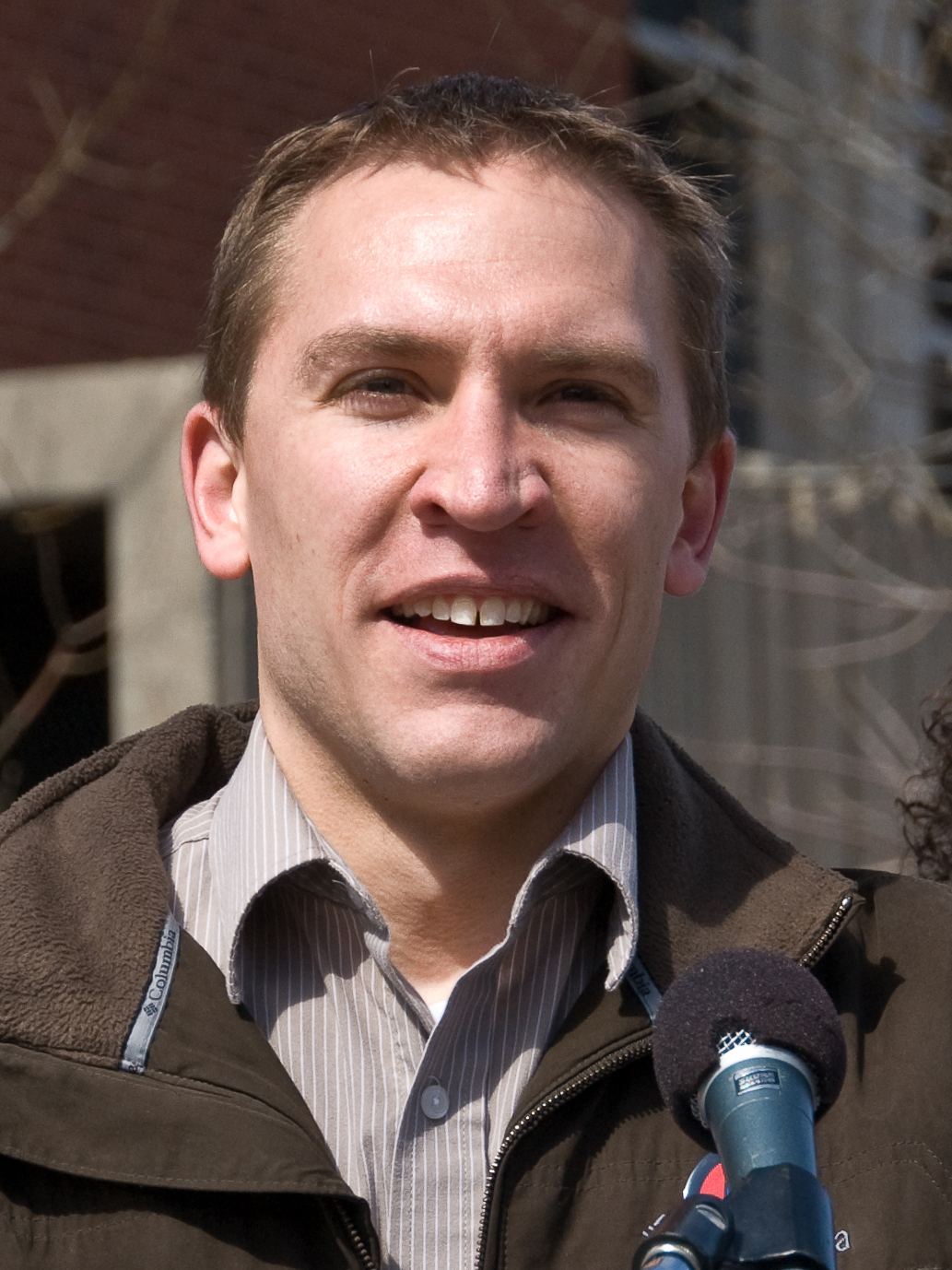
Candidate	Chris Abele	Chris Larson
Popular vote	156,509	125,240
Percentage	55.34%	44.28%
County Executive before election
Chris Abele
Nonpartisan
Elected County Executive
Chris Abele
Nonpartisan

The 2016 Milwaukee County Executive election took place on April 5, 2016, following a primary election on February 16, 2016. Incumbent County Executive Chris Abele ran for re-election to a second full term. He was challenged by State Senator Chris Larson. Larson narrowly placed first in the primary election, receiving 45 percent of the vote to Abele's 44 percent. In the general election, however, Abele defeated Larson by a wide margin, winning re-election 55–44 percent.

== Primary election ==
=== Candidates ===
- Chris Larson, State Senator
- Chris Abele, incumbent County Executive
- Steve Hogan, carpenter, retired U.S. Navy officer
- Joseph Thomas Klein, IT worker, Wisconsin Army National Guard veteran

=== Results ===
Primary election results
Party	Candidate	Votes	%
Nonpartisan	Chris Larson	48,631	44.82%
Nonpartisan	Chris Abele (inc.)	47,993	44.23%
Nonpartisan	Steve Hogan	6,596	6.08%
Nonpartisan	Joseph Thomas Klein	4,734	4.36%
Write-in		551	0.51%
Total votes		108,505	100.00%

== General election ==
=== Results ===
2016 Milwaukee County Executive election results
Party	Candidate	Votes	%
Nonpartisan	Chris Abele (inc.)	156,509	55.34%
Nonpartisan	Chris Larson	125,240	44.28%
Write-in		1,072	0.38%
Total votes		282,821	100.00%
