= 1998 Wisconsin gubernatorial election =

- November 3, 1998
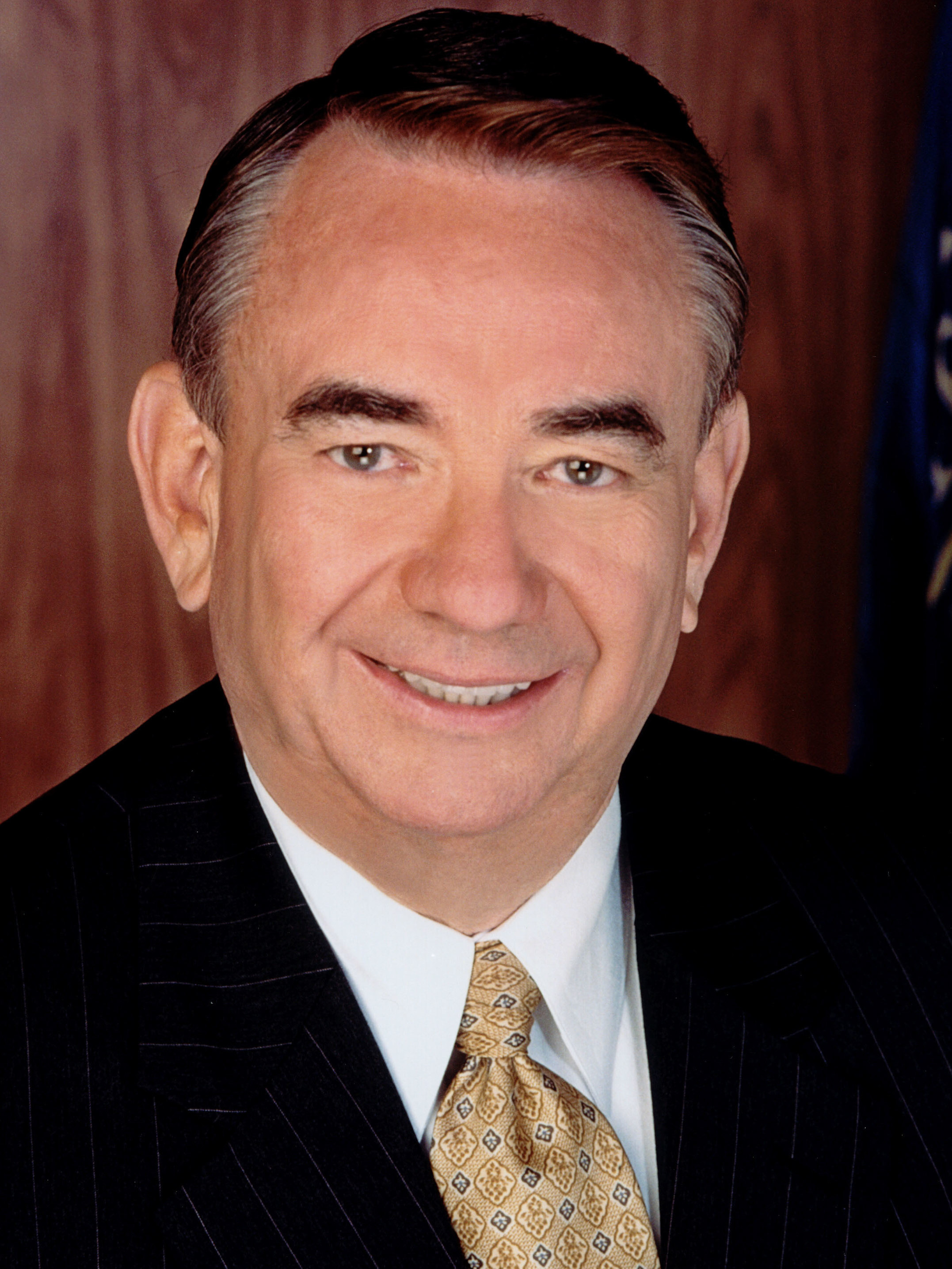

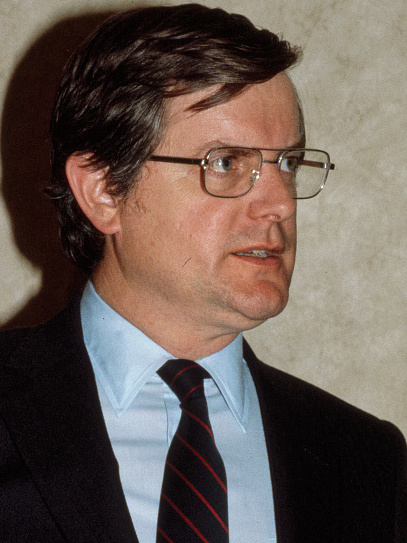
Nominee	Tommy Thompson	Ed Garvey
Party	Republican	Democratic
Running mate	Scott McCallum	Barbara Lawton
Popular vote	1,047,716	679,553
Percentage	59.66%	38.70%
- Thompson: 40–50% 50–60% 60–70% 70–80% 80–90% >90% Garvey: 40–50% 50–60% 60–70% 70–80% 80–90% >90% Tie
Governor before election
Tommy Thompson
Republican
Elected Governor
Tommy Thompson
Republican

The 1998 Wisconsin gubernatorial election was held on November 3, 1998. Incumbent Governor Tommy Thompson won re-election for his fourth consecutive term with 59.66% of the vote. As of 2026, this is most recent gubernatorial election in which Milwaukee, Rock, Portage, and Iowa counties voted for the Republican candidate, the most recent where the winner garnered a double-digit margin of victory, and the last time a governor in the United States was reelected to a fourth consecutive four-year term.

== Primary election ==
The primary election was held on September 8, 1998. Nominees for Governor and Lieutenant Governor were selected in separate primaries before running on a joint ticket in the general election.

=== Republican party ===
==== Governor ====
===== Candidates =====
- Jeffrey A. Hyslop
- Tommy G. Thompson, incumbent governor

===== Results =====
Republican gubernatorial primary results
Party	Candidate	Votes	%
Republican	Tommy G. Thompson (incumbent)	229,916	83.55%
Republican	Jeffrey A. Hyslop	45,262	16.45%
Total votes		275,168	100.00%

==== Lieutenant Governor ====
===== Candidates =====
- Scott McCallum, incumbent lieutenant governor

===== Results =====
Republican lieutenant gubernatorial primary results
Party	Candidate	Votes	%
Republican	Scott McCallum (incumbent)	217,059	100.00%
Total votes		217,059	100.00%

=== Democratic party ===
==== Governor ====
===== Candidates =====
- Ed Garvey, former executive director of the NFLPA and candidate for US Senate in 1986
- Gary R. George, member of Wisconsin Senate

===== Results =====
Democratic gubernatorial primary results
Party	Candidate	Votes	%
Democratic	Ed Garvey	175,082	79.98%
Democratic	Gary R. George	43,830	20.02%
Total votes		218,912	100.00%

==== Lieutenant Governor ====
===== Candidates =====
- Barbara Lawton, businesswoman

===== Results =====
Democratic lieutenant gubernatorial primary results
Party	Candidate	Votes	%
Democratic	Barbara Lawton	178,022	100.00%
Total votes		178,022	100.00%

=== Libertarian party ===
==== Governor ====
===== Candidates =====
- Jim Mueller

===== Results =====
Libertarian gubernatorial primary results
Party	Candidate	Votes	%
Libertarian	Jim Mueller	854	100.00%
Total votes		854	100.00%

==== Lieutenant Governor ====
===== Candidates =====
- James Dean

===== Results =====
Libertarian lieutenant gubernatorial primary results
Party	Candidate	Votes	%
Libertarian	James Dean	830	100.00%
Total votes		830	100.00%

=== US Taxpayers' party ===
==== Governor ====
===== Candidates =====
- Edward J. Frami

===== Results =====
US Taxpayers' gubernatorial primary results
Party	Candidate	Votes	%
U.S. Taxpayers'	Edward J. Frami	1,252	100.00%
Total votes		1,252	100.00%

==== Lieutenant Governor ====
===== Candidates =====
- Thomas R. Rivers

===== Results =====
US Taxpayers' lieutenant gubernatorial primary results
Party	Candidate	Votes	%
U.S. Taxpayers'	Thomas R. Rivers	1,232	100.00%
Total votes		1,232	100.00%

=== Green party ===
==== Governor ====
===== Candidates =====
- Jeffrey Lane Smith

===== Results =====
Green gubernatorial primary results
Party	Candidate	Votes	%
Green	Jeffrey Lane Smith (write-in)	15	100.00%
Total votes		15	100.00%

=== Independent nominations ===
==== Governor ====
===== Candidates =====
- Mike Mangan
- A-Ja-mu Muhammad

===== Results =====
Independent gubernatorial primary results
Party	Candidate	Votes	%
Independent	Mike Mangan	374	69.13%
Independent	A-Ja-mu Muhammad	167	30.87%
Total votes		541	100.00%

==== Lieutenant Governor ====
===== Candidates =====
- Vida Harley Bridges

===== Results =====
Independent lieutenant gubernatorial primary results
Party	Candidate	Votes	%
Independent	Vida Harley Bridges	369	100.00%
Total votes		369	100.00%

== General election ==
=== Candidates ===
- Ed Garvey & Barbara Lawton, Democrat
- Tommy G. Thompson & Scott McCallum, Republican
- Jim Mueller & James Dean, Libertarian
- Edward J. Frami & Thomas R. Rivers, US Taxpayers'
- Jeffrey Lane Smith, Green
- Mike Mangan, Independent
- A-Ja-mu Muhammad & Vida Harley Bridges, Independent

=== Polling ===
Poll source	Date(s) administered	Sample size (Note: Key: A – all adults RV – registered voters LV – likely voters V – unclear)	Margin of error	Tommy Thompson (R)	Ed Garvey (D)	Undecided
Market Shares Corporation (Note: Poll sponsored by WTMJ-TV)	October 21–24, 1998	600 (LV)	± 4.0%	67%	26%	7%
St. Norbert College Survey Center (Note: Poll sponsored by the Green Bay News-Chronicle & Wisconsin Public Radio)	October 8–20, 1998	415 (LV)	± 4.8%	63%	28%	9%
Journal Sentinel Research and Public Policy Forum	October 2–9, 1998	314 (LV)	± 5.5%	60%	30%	10%
WISC-TV/Wisconsin State Journal	August 7–26, 1998	271 (LV)	± 5.9%	60%	18%	22%
Louis Harris & Associates	July 7–18, 1998	1,000 (A)	± 3.0%	58%	27%	15%
WISC-TV/Wisconsin State Journal	May, 1998	403 (A)	± 5.0%	55%	19%	26%
St. Norbert College Survey Center (Note: Poll sponsored by Wisconsin Public Radio)	February 17 – March 24, 1998	400 (LV)	± 5.0%	60%	26%	14%
Journal Sentinel Research and Public Policy Forum	February, 1998	497 (LV)	± 4.5%	60%	23%	17%
St. Norbert College Survey Center	Fall, 1997	417 (LV)	± 5.0%	64%	26%	10%

=== Results ===
1998 Wisconsin gubernatorial election
Party	Candidate	Votes	%	±%
Republican	Tommy G. Thompson (incumbent)	1,047,716	59.66%	−7.56%
Democratic	Ed Garvey	679,553	38.70%	+7.82%
Libertarian	Jim Mueller	11,071	0.63%	−0.11%
U.S. Taxpayers'	Edward J. Frami	10,269	0.58%	−0.01%
Independent	Mike Mangan	4,985	0.28%	−0.24%
Independent	A-Ja-mu Muhammad	1,604	0.09%	
Green	Jeffrey L. Smith (write-in)	14	0.00%	
	Scattering	802	0.05%	
Majority		368,163	20.97%	
Total votes		1,756,014	100.00%	
Republican hold		Swing	-15.39%	

=== Results by county ===
County	Tommy G. Thompson Republican		Ed Garvey Democratic		All Others Various		Margin		Total votes cast
County	#	%	#	%	#	%	#	%	Total votes cast
Adams	3,907	60.55%	2,450	37.97%	95	1.47%	1,457	22.58%	6,452
Ashland	2,611	48.90%	2,692	50.41%	37	0.69%	-81	-1.52%	5,340
Barron	7,449	56.03%	5,716	43.00%	129	0.97%	1,733	13.04%	13,294
Bayfield	2,817	45.35%	3,352	53.96%	43	0.69%	-535	-8.61%	6,212
Brown	47,529	62.84%	27,302	36.10%	803	1.06%	20,227	26.74%	75,634
Buffalo	2,523	58.61%	1,736	40.33%	46	1.07%	787	18.28%	4,305
Burnett	3,076	50.19%	3,011	49.13%	42	0.69%	65	1.06%	6,129
Calumet	9,153	69.17%	3,873	29.27%	206	1.56%	5,280	39.90%	13,232
Chippewa	10,363	62.03%	6,132	36.70%	212	1.27%	4,231	25.32%	16,707
Clark	6,951	64.94%	3,633	33.94%	120	1.12%	3,318	31.00%	10,704
Columbia	10,456	60.41%	6,503	37.57%	349	2.02%	3,953	22.84%	17,308
Crawford	3,646	59.19%	2,457	39.89%	57	0.93%	1,189	19.30%	6,160
Dane	72,693	44.78%	86,234	53.12%	3,396	2.09%	-13,541	-8.34%	162,323
Dodge	16,245	70.16%	6,417	27.72%	491	2.12%	9,828	42.45%	23,153
Door	6,392	63.07%	3,597	35.49%	146	1.44%	2,795	27.58%	10,135
Douglas	5,905	46.82%	6,550	51.93%	158	1.25%	-645	-5.11%	12,613
Dunn	5,764	53.24%	4,927	45.51%	135	1.25%	837	7.73%	10,826
Eau Claire	17,168	56.43%	12,715	41.79%	541	1.78%	4,453	14.64%	30,424
Florence	1,104	68.15%	506	31.23%	10	0.62%	598	36.91%	1,620
Fond du Lac	19,682	70.75%	7,685	27.63%	452	1.62%	11,997	43.13%	27,819
Forest	1,988	57.94%	1,427	41.59%	16	0.47%	561	16.35%	3,431
Grant	8,371	63.54%	4,673	35.47%	131	0.99%	3,698	28.07%	13,175
Green	6,756	63.82%	3,610	34.10%	220	2.08%	3,146	29.72%	10,586
Green Lake	4,297	71.52%	1,640	27.30%	71	1.18%	2,657	44.22%	6,008
Iowa	4,270	58.05%	2,990	40.65%	96	1.31%	1,280	17.40%	7,356
Iron	1,594	61.31%	987	37.96%	19	0.73%	607	23.35%	2,600
Jackson	3,447	54.04%	2,813	44.10%	119	1.87%	634	9.94%	6,379
Jefferson	15,363	65.27%	7,647	32.49%	529	2.25%	7,716	32.78%	23,539
Juneau	4,402	67.02%	2,063	31.41%	103	1.57%	2,339	35.61%	6,568
Kenosha	28,128	61.34%	17,011	37.09%	720	1.57%	11,117	24.24%	45,859
Kewaunee	4,578	63.17%	2,582	35.63%	87	1.20%	1,996	27.54%	7,247
La Crosse	21,984	58.63%	14,892	39.72%	619	1.65%	7,092	18.91%	37,495
Lafayette	3,423	65.84%	1,743	33.53%	33	0.63%	1,680	32.31%	5,199
Langlade	4,107	62.80%	2,376	36.33%	57	0.87%	1,731	26.47%	6,540
Lincoln	5,300	57.79%	3,567	38.89%	304	3.31%	1,733	18.90%	9,171
Manitowoc	17,733	62.63%	10,291	36.35%	289	1.02%	7,442	26.28%	28,313
Marathon	25,966	64.91%	13,511	33.77%	529	1.32%	12,455	31.13%	40,006
Marinette	9,457	66.25%	4,716	33.04%	102	0.71%	4,741	33.21%	14,275
Marquette	3,112	64.70%	1,624	33.76%	74	1.54%	1,488	30.94%	4,810
Menominee	300	28.90%	725	69.85%	13	1.25%	-425	-40.94%	1,038
Milwaukee	145,010	49.77%	140,666	48.28%	5,699	1.96%	4,344	1.49%	291,375
Monroe	7,465	63.45%	4,148	35.25%	153	1.30%	3,317	28.19%	11,766
Oconto	7,655	64.62%	4,097	34.59%	94	0.79%	3,558	30.04%	11,846
Oneida	7,816	59.82%	5,088	38.94%	161	1.23%	2,728	20.88%	13,065
Outagamie	32,761	64.23%	17,500	34.31%	742	1.45%	15,261	29.92%	51,003
Ozaukee	23,716	75.34%	7,283	23.14%	480	1.52%	16,433	52.20%	31,479
Pepin	1,173	54.48%	958	44.50%	22	1.02%	215	9.99%	2,153
Pierce	5,852	57.13%	4,285	41.83%	106	1.03%	1,567	15.30%	10,243
Polk	6,820	53.21%	5,896	46.00%	101	0.79%	924	7.21%	12,817
Portage	12,038	55.42%	9,309	42.86%	373	1.72%	2,729	12.56%	21,720
Price	3,568	60.44%	2,298	38.93%	37	0.63%	1,270	21.51%	5,903
Racine	34,337	56.03%	25,803	42.11%	1,141	1.86%	8,534	13.93%	61,281
Richland	3,502	61.91%	2,061	36.43%	94	1.66%	1,441	25.47%	5,657
Rock	27,485	55.86%	21,109	42.90%	613	1.25%	6,376	12.96%	49,207
Rusk	3,108	55.85%	2,375	42.68%	82	1.47%	733	13.17%	5,565
Sauk	10,206	61.94%	6,008	36.47%	262	1.59%	4,198	25.48%	16,476
Sawyer	3,432	60.57%	2,185	38.56%	49	0.86%	1,247	22.01%	5,666
Shawano	9,106	67.12%	4,353	32.09%	108	0.80%	4,753	35.03%	13,567
Sheboygan	26,880	67.97%	12,162	30.75%	504	1.27%	14,718	37.22%	39,546
St. Croix	10,612	62.25%	6,225	36.52%	210	1.23%	4,387	25.73%	17,047
Taylor	4,482	66.98%	2,147	32.08%	63	0.94%	2,335	34.89%	6,692
Trempealeau	5,086	58.29%	3,543	40.60%	97	1.11%	1,543	17.68%	8,726
Vernon	5,326	56.60%	3,918	41.64%	166	1.76%	1,408	14.96%	9,410
Vilas	5,342	63.98%	2,836	33.97%	171	2.05%	2,506	30.02%	8,349
Walworth	17,316	67.64%	7,839	30.62%	447	1.75%	9,477	37.02%	25,602
Washburn	3,022	53.25%	2,602	45.85%	51	0.90%	420	7.40%	5,675
Washington	29,102	74.38%	9,164	23.42%	859	2.20%	19,938	50.96%	39,125
Waukesha	98,555	73.83%	32,384	24.26%	2,556	1.91%	66,171	49.57%	133,495
Waupaca	10,771	66.72%	5,191	32.15%	182	1.13%	5,580	34.56%	16,144
Waushara	5,289	68.52%	2,299	29.78%	131	1.70%	2,990	38.74%	7,719
Winnebago	33,496	65.81%	16,436	32.29%	966	1.90%	17,060	33.52%	50,898
Wood	17,377	64.81%	9,009	33.60%	426	1.59%	8,368	31.21%	26,812
Total	1,047,716	59.66%	679,553	38.70%	28,745	1.64%	368,163	20.97%	1,756,014

==== Counties that flipped from Republican to Democratic ====
- Ashland
- Bayfield
- Dane
- Douglas

== See also ==
- 1998 United States Senate election in Wisconsin
- 1998 United States gubernatorial elections

== Notes ==
Partisan clients
