= Mark Lipscomb Jr. =

American politician

Member of the Wisconsin Senate from the 6th district
- In office May 4, 1971 – January 1, 1973
- Preceded by: Martin J. Schreiber
- Succeeded by: Monroe Swan

Member of the Wisconsin State Assembly from the Milwaukee 1st district
- In office January 4, 1965 – May 4, 1971
- Preceded by: Stan Pelecky
- Succeeded by: Gus Menos

Personal details
- Born: September 1, 1935 (age 90) Milwaukee, Wisconsin
- Party: Democratic
- Children: Theodore "Theo" Lipscomb
- Education: Marquette University (B.S., 1957)
- Profession: lawyer, postal clerk

Mark G. Lipscomb, Jr., (born September 1, 1935) is an American lawyer, former postal clerk and politician from Milwaukee, Wisconsin who served four terms as a Democratic member of the Wisconsin State Assembly and one partial term in the Wisconsin State Senate.

== Background ==
Lipscomb was born in Milwaukee, Wisconsin on September 1, 1935. He graduated from Marquette University High School, and earned a B.S. in business administration from Marquette University in 1957 (he was a track athlete, specializing in the half-mile run and president of the track club). He served in the Marines from 1957 to 1960, then got a LL.B. from Marquette's law school in 1964. In addition to his law practice, he has worked as a postal clerk, and belonged to the United Federation of Postal Clerks.

== Public office ==
In 1964 Lipscomb ran for the Assembly's first Milwaukee County District (the 1st Ward of the City of Milwaukee, and the 6th Ward of the City of Glendale). After unseating incumbent Stan Pelecky with a plurality in a six-way Democratic primary election (36.9% to Pelecky's 29.6%), he was unopposed in the general election. He was assigned to the standing committees on finance and third reading (chairing the latter), and to Wisconsin Legislative Council special joint committees to study Wisconsin's civil service and Milwaukee County's children's court system (chairing the latter). He was unopposed in the 1966 primary, and beat his Republican opponent Herbert Schollmeyer 7054 to 2086. After an easy win in the 1970 primary, he again defeated Schollmeyer in the general election, by a larger margin.

In 1971, Lipscomb ran for the 6th District State Senate seat vacated when Martin J. Schreiber was elected Lieutenant Governor of Wisconsin. He won his March 2 primary with 3445 votes to 2828 for fellow State Representative Paul Sicula. In the April 6 special general election, he won easily, with 6709 votes to 1735 for Republican James Mallas. Lipscomb (a strong unicameralist), tried to take his office as Senator while retaining his Assembly seat, arguing that "I might have stayed as chairman of the (Assembly) Judiciary Committee. I had the second-most number of bills in committee. I had a pact with Paul Sicula that we could get all the bills out. I could have gone over to sit in Schreiber's seat. Almost everything in the Senate is by acclamation. I could have sat there and kept track of everything going on in the Assembly."

Lipscomb ran unsuccessfully in the spring of 1972 for Milwaukee city attorney, and actively lobbied to make sure that the revised 6th District was one which reflected the increased number of African Americans in Milwaukee County. In the Senate, Lipscomb faced a drastically changed district. In the wake of the decennial legislative redistricting, it had a very different composition. In a racially charged atmosphere, Lipscomb (who had said the 60%-black district deserved a black senator "but not yet, because I'm running") lost the Democratic nomination to long-time community activist Monroe Swan, who mustered a plurality in a three-way race, with 3256 votes for Swan, 2729 for Lipscomb, and 987 for Roger Hansen. Lipscomb unsuccessfully challenged the primary results, alleging fraud, including assertions that Hansen (a white bakery employee) was a fraudulent candidate recruited and supported by the Swan campaign to dilute the white vote in the race in return for money or a job. Swan would eventually lose his office due to a felony conviction for election fraud in another race.

== After the Senate ==
Lipscomb returned to the practice of law; he has served as a local prosecutor in River Hills and Brown Deer. In his college days at Marquette, he was a track athlete, specializing in the half-mile run (now 800 meters). He remained on the governing board of the Wisconsin Department of Veterans Affairs; and in 1979 made an unsuccessful bid to election as a Milwaukee County circuit court judge. In 1992, he lost a tight three-way primary contest for the Democratic nomination to the 23rd Assembly District seat, coming in second to eventual victor John La Fave.

His son Theodore "Theo" Lipscomb was on the Milwaukee County Board of Supervisors. Another son, Christopher, is the North Shore Municipal Court judge for Glendale and Brown Deer.
