= Barbara Lawton =

American politician (born 1951)

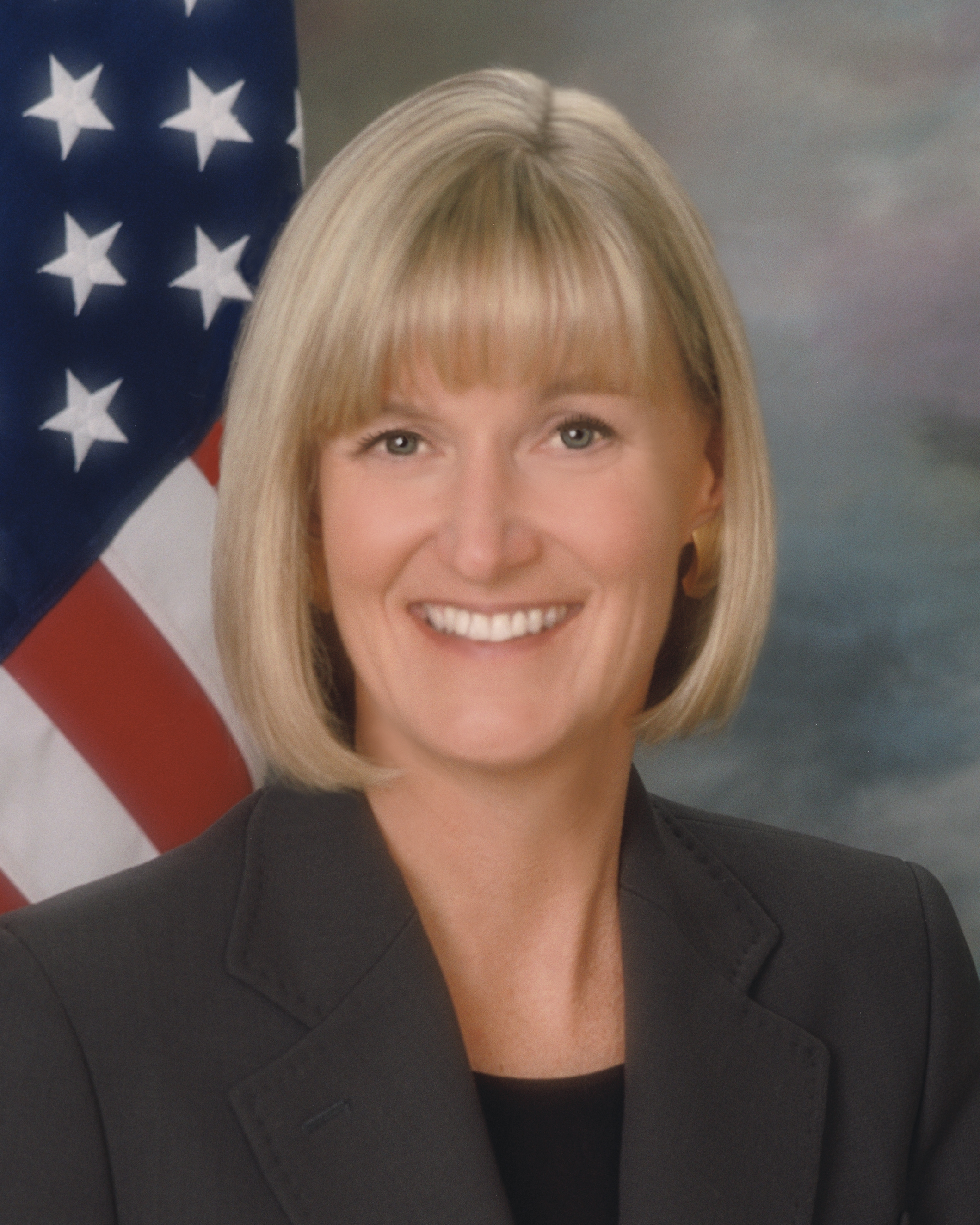

43rd Lieutenant Governor of Wisconsin
- In office January 6, 2003 – January 3, 2011
- Governor: Jim Doyle
- Preceded by: Margaret Farrow
- Succeeded by: Rebecca Kleefisch

49th Chair of the National Lieutenant Governors Association
- In office 2008–2009
- Preceded by: Jack Dalrymple
- Succeeded by: Bill Bolling

Personal details
- Born: Barbara Smith; July 5, 1951 (age 75) Green Bay, Wisconsin, U.S.
- Party: Democratic
- Spouse: Cal Lawton
- Education: Lawrence University (BA); University of Wisconsin, Madison (MA)
- Profession: Business consultant

Barbara Lawton (born July 5, 1951) is an American businesswoman and politician from Green Bay, Wisconsin, who is the president and CEO of Americans for Campaign Reform. A member of the Democratic Party, Lawton was the 43rd Lieutenant Governor of Wisconsin. She became the first woman elected to the position in 2002, as the running mate of then state Attorney General Jim Doyle. Lawton was re-elected on November 7, 2006. She was co-founder and Director of External Affairs for Issue One, a nonprofit whose goal is to reduce the influence of money in politics.

== Personal background ==
Barbara Smith grew up in southeastern Wisconsin, first in Hales Corners and then on a farm near Waterford. She worked her way through college, ultimately earning a degree in Spanish from Lawrence University in Appleton and a master's degree in Spanish from the University of Wisconsin–Madison. Lawton has an Honorary Doctorate of Law from Lawrence University and an Honorary Doctorate of Fine Arts from the Milwaukee Institute of Art and Design. She met and married Charles "Cal" Lawton in 1973 when she was a student at the University of Wisconsin–Green Bay.

During thirty-five years living in the Green Bay area, Barbara Lawton was active in the community, helping to co-found the Greater Green Bay Community Foundation and was a leader in the Educational Resource Foundation. She was also a founding member of the Latinos Unidos and the Green Bay Area Multicultural Center. She served on the Entrepreneurs of Color Advisory Board, winning their first Founders' Award. She also served on the Northeast Wisconsin Technical College Foundation Board.

Barbara and Cal Lawton have two children, Joseph and Amanda, and four grandchildren: Bella, Molly, James, and Max. The Lawtons presently reside in Algoma, Wisconsin.

Professionally, Lawton worked as an international business consultant, helping businesses export their products to the Southern Cone of South America and providing cultural training. The Lawton family lived for a time in Oaxaca, Mexico and Santiago, Chile.

Prior to being elected lieutenant governor in 2002, Lawton won the Democratic primary for lieutenant governor in 1998 and ran alongside the party's nominee for governor, attorney Ed Garvey. The Garvey/Lawton ticket lost to incumbent Tommy Thompson and Scott McCallum. Lawton also ran unsuccessfully for the Wisconsin State Senate in 1992.

== Citizens Panel on a Clean Elections Option ==
Lawton was a commissioner on the 1997 "Citizens Panel on a Clean Elections Option" that was formed due to the "growing perception of corruption" within the political system. The panel outlined a public policy plan for full-public financing of political campaigns that would "pass constitutional muster." The panel was also known as the "Heffernan Commission" referring to the retired Wisconsin Supreme Court Chief Justice, Nathan Heffernan, who chaired the panel.

== Lieutenant governor ==
As lieutenant governor, Lawton took on many issues, most related to economic development, climate change, and campaign reform. In 2003 she launched an economic development initiative called "Wisconsin Women = Prosperity". Lawton has also worked on clean energy policy, stem cell research and affordable higher education. In 2007, Lawton authored and passed the Energy Independence and Climate Protection Resolution at the National Lieutenant Governors Association. Lawton also chaired the Wisconsin Arts Board.

A 2006 editorial in the Madison, Wisconsin daily The Capital Times called Lawton "the boldest and most active lieutenant governor in state history".

== National Lieutenant Governor's Association ==
Barbara Lawton was unanimously elected Chairwoman of the National Lieutenant Governor's Association (NLGA) at their 2008 annual meeting in Buffalo, NY. Lawton served as the vice-chair of the NLGA in 2007.

In September 2008, as Chairwoman of the NLGA, Lawton had traveled on a mission to China along with Lt. Governors from Alabama, Connecticut, Kansas and Nevada. There, she signed a student exchange agreement between the University of Wisconsin–Madison and Tsinghua University in Beijing. Lawton also reached an agreement for the two Universities to form an exploratory commission to create a Global Manufacturing Institute.

== 2010 gubernatorial run ==
On August 15, 2009, Politico announced Governor Doyle will not be seeking a third term according to sources familiar with his campaign. Soon after this announcement, Lawton's entry into the race was confirmed. Two months later, on October 26, 2009, Lawton announced she would be withdrawing from the race, citing "personal reasons."

== Americans for Campaign Reform ==
On January 6, 2014, Lawton was named the president and CEO of Americans for Campaign Reform, an advocacy organization based in Washington, D.C., chaired by former senators Bill Bradley (D-NJ), Bob Kerrey (D-NE), and Alan Simpson (R-WY). The organization advocates for public funding of federal elections.

=== Issue One ===
In October 2014, Americans for Campaign Reform announced its merger with another campaign finance reform group, Fund for the Republic. The merged organizations adopted the name Issue One. Issue One is based in Washington, D.C., and is run by Nick Penniman. Lawton formerly led the organization's external affairs department.

== Endorsements ==
Lawton co-chaired Hillary Clinton's Wisconsin campaign during the 2008 Democratic presidential primary. During the 2016 Democratic presidential primary, Lawton endorsed Senator Bernie Sanders.

== Electoral history ==
=== Wisconsin Senate (1996) ===
Year	Election	Date	Elected				Defeated				Total	Plurality
1996	Primary	Sep. 8	Barbara Lawton	Democratic	5,604	60.06%	Tony Vanderbloemen	Dem.	3,727	39.94%	9,331	1,877
1996	General	Nov. 8	Gary Drzewiecki (inc)	Republican	32,096	51.79%	Barbara Lawton	Dem.	29,872	48.21%	61,968	2,224

== See also ==
- List of female lieutenant governors in the United States

Party political offices
Preceded by Dorothy Dean	Democratic nominee for Lieutenant Governor of Wisconsin; 1998, 2002, 2006	Succeeded by Tom Nelson
Political offices
Preceded by Margaret Farrow	Lieutenant Governor of Wisconsin; 2003–2011	Succeeded by Rebecca Kleefisch
