= Monroe Swan =

20th century American politician

Member of the Wisconsin Senate from the 6th district
- In office January 1, 1973 – October 22, 1980
- Preceded by: Mark Lipscomb Jr.
- Succeeded by: Gary George

Personal details
- Born: June 2, 1937 (age 89) Belzoni, Mississippi, U.S.
- Party: Democratic
- Spouse: JoeAnn Swan
- Children: 4
- Education: Milwaukee Area Technical College; University of Wisconsin–Milwaukee

Monroe Swan (born June 2, 1937) is a retired American government administrator and Democratic politician from Milwaukee, Wisconsin. He was the first African American member of the Wisconsin Senate, representing Wisconsin's 6th Senate district from 1973 to 1980. His political career ended when he was convicted of fraud for using federal program money to pay campaign workers.

== Background ==
Born in Belzoni, Mississippi, Swan was a graduate of Springfield Technical High School of Springfield, Massachusetts. After he graduated from it, he served as an employment counselor and community activist. In 1964, he received his associate degree from Milwaukee Area Technical College and then his bachelor's degree from University of Wisconsin–Milwaukee in 1967.

== Senate service ==
In 1972, Swan was elected to the Wisconsin State Senate from Milwaukee, Wisconsin after unseating incumbent Mark Lipscomb Jr. in a racially charged 6th District Democratic primary election. Lipscomb (who was running unsuccessfully for Milwaukee city attorney) had actively lobbied to make sure that the revised 6th District was one which reflected the increased number of African Americans in Milwaukee County. In the wake of the decennial legislative redistricting, the district had a very different composition.

Lipscomb (who had said the 60%-black district deserved a black senator "but not yet, because I'm running") lost the Democratic nomination to Swan, who mustered a plurality in a three-way race, with 3256 votes for Swan, 2729 for Lipscomb, and 987 for Roger Hansen. Lipscomb unsuccessfully challenged the primary results, alleging fraud, including assertions that Hansen (a white bakery employee) was a fraudulent candidate recruited and supported by the Swan campaign to dilute the white vote in the race in return for money or a job. In the subsequent general election, Swan had no trouble winning.

Swan served from 1973 until his removal from office because of his felony conviction of illegally using federally funded CETA money for his campaign for the nomination for Lieutenant Governor.

Wisconsin Senate
| Preceded by Mark Lipscomb Jr. | Member of the Wisconsin Senate from the 6th district January 1, 1973 – October 22, 1980 | Succeeded by Gary George |
