= Stan Pelecky =

American lawyer and politician

Stan Pelecky is a former member of the Wisconsin State Assembly.

== Biography ==
Pelecky was born on April 27, 1934, in Milwaukee, Wisconsin. After graduating from Washington High School, Pelecky attended the University of Wisconsin–Madison and Marquette University. He would also serve in the United States Army with the Signal Corps and the 32nd Infantry Division and as counsel during special courts-martial. He died on March 24, 1997.

== Political career ==
Pelecky was elected to the Assembly in 1962. Previously, he was an unsuccessful candidate for the Assembly in 1960 and for the Wisconsin State Senate in 1958. He was defeated in the Democratic primary for his seat by Mark Lipscomb Jr. in 1964.
