= Gary George (Wisconsin politician) =

American politician (1954-)

President pro tempore of the Wisconsin Senate
- In office January 4, 1999 – January 6, 2003
- Preceded by: Gwen Moore
- Succeeded by: Robert T. Welch

Member of the Wisconsin Senate from the 6th district
- In office January 5, 1981 – November 18, 2003
- Preceded by: Monroe Swan
- Succeeded by: Spencer Coggs

Personal details
- Born: March 8, 1954 (age 72) Milwaukee, Wisconsin, U.S.
- Party: Democratic
- Spouses: Mary Cook (m. 1978; div. 1990); Patricia L. Schulz
- Children: 2 with Mary Cook; 2 with Patricia Schulz
- Education: University of Wisconsin–Madison (B.B.A.); University of Michigan Law School (J.D.)
- Profession: Lawyer

Gary R. George (born March 8, 1954) is an African American lawyer and former politician from Milwaukee, Wisconsin. A Democrat, he represented Milwaukee in the Wisconsin Senate for nearly 23 years. He faced a series of ethical and criminal controversies throughout his political career before finally being recalled from office in 2003. He subsequently pleaded guilty to federal conspiracy charges in which he admitted receiving kickbacks from individuals and organizations after he had directed state or federal funds to them; he served three years in federal prison. He was also implicated in the Vang Pao Laotian coup plot, but was never charged.

== Early life and education ==
Gary George was born and raised, and lived most of his life in Milwaukee, Wisconsin. He graduated from Marquette University High School, received his bachelor's in business administration from the University of Wisconsin–Madison, and earned his J.D. from University of Michigan Law School in 1979.

== Political career ==
George made his first run for public office shortly after graduating from law school. He launched a primary challenge in 1980 against Democratic incumbent state senator Monroe Swan—Wisconsin's first African American state senator—in the 6th State Senate district. Swan was already a controversial figure in the state, and his chances of re-election were badly damaged when he was indicted by federal prosecutors in July 1980. George defeated Swan in the September 1980 primary election, receiving 60% of the vote. He went on to easily win the general election over Republican Joseph Barrington, in the overwhelmingly Democratic district. After winning another contested primary against Monroe Swan in 1984, he was elected to five more terms in the Wisconsin Senate facing no opposition until the 2003 recall which ended his career.

Despite claims by George and others and in violation of residency requirements of the Wisconsin State Senate, he moved his family to Ozaukee County in 1986, buying a home on Port Washington Rd on the border of Mequon and Grafton (10820 N. Port Washington Rd.). George would own this home until 1992. In 1989, he started using his address at the Catholic Knights building to conceal the fact that he had moved his family to Ozaukee County three years earlier. George had purchased a second home in Grafton even farther north, in an even more exclusive area within the village of Grafton, in 1990, where he continued to live for decades after the 2003 recall (despite the increased scrutiny he still resided there during his 2014 election and afterwards). George had lived at home on 42nd and Capital Drive from 1980 to 1985 before moving to Grafton in 1986. (Wisconsin Elections Board. (1993). In the matter of the residency investigation of State Senator Gary R. George. State of Wisconsin. n re Disciplinary Proceedings Against George, 182 Wis. 2d 105, 514 N.W.2d 411 (Wis. 1994)). Ozaukee County Register of Deeds. (1994). Property transfer and ownership index: Village of Grafton (Deed Records Reference No. 1994-GG). Ozaukee County Government, Port Washington, WI. Horne, M. (2014, June 27). (House Confidential: Gary George's Grafton mansion. Urban Milwaukee. https://urbanmilwaukee.com/2014/06/27/house-confidential-gary-georges-grafton-mansion/). Murphy, B. (2003). Investigative series on state senatorial residency violations and the Gary George recall election. Milwaukee Journal Sentinel. Schultze, S., & Borowski, G. J. (2003). Behind the district lines: The hidden properties and residency tracking of Senator Gary George. Milwaukee Journal Sentinel. Ozaukee County Register of Deeds. (1991). Wisconsin Legislative Reference Bureau. (1981)

In the Senate, George served in several important positions. He was Senate co-chair of the powerful budget-writing Joint Finance Committee from 1984 through 1993 and later served as chairman of the Senate Judiciary Committee. After several years of feuding with Democratic leadership in the mid-1990s, they reconciled after the 1998 election, allowing him to serve as President President pro tempore of the Senate, chairman of the Senate Judiciary Committee, and co-chair of the Joint Legislative Audit Committee in the 1999 and 2001 sessions. Despite being a Democratic senator in a heavily Democratic district, George was seen as frequently aligning with the budget priorities of the Republican governor Tommy Thompson, so much so that there was public speculation that George was seeking favors from the Thompson administration.

=== First recall (1986) ===
He faced his first recall effort during his second term, in 1986, when a group of his constituents became outraged at comments he made in support of Republican president Ronald Reagan and Reagan administration programs. He made the comments during a brief run for the Democratic nomination for United States senate that year. In September, the recall campaign submitted petitions containing nearly 10,000 signatures to the state elections board seeking George's recall. George and his team then engaged in a successful campaign to challenge the validity of the petitions. One signature-collector, Anthony Morales, was found to not be a resident of the district, and therefore all of the 2,103 signatures he collected were thrown out. Another 1,157 signatures were found to be from voters who did not live in George's district. After those disqualifications, the recall was left with just 6,675 signatures, short of the 6,959 needed to trigger a recall.

=== 1990 ethics charges ===
Following a two-year investigation, George was found to be one of a dozen lawmakers who accepted small amounts of money from lobbyists in violation of state ethics laws. George was accused of receiving $120 total from two lobbyists, and improperly accepting a free hotel room and meals from another lobbyist. He was fined $1,907 and ordered to serve 200 hours of community service. It was later found that he counted some of his legislative duties as his community service and billed the state $64 per day for some of the activities.

=== Divorce and abuse charges ===
George's wife, Mary, filed for divorce in October 1990, and the matter immediately became quite messy and public. A court commissioner quickly made the determination that the couple had already been living beyond their financial means. With the divorce still unresolved the following Spring, George filed a lawsuit against his estranged wife and her alleged lover, accusing them of ambushing him after he came to install a basketball hoop at the home he had previously shared with his wife and children—George had moved out during the divorce. Mary George countered with accusations that George had instigated the fight and had struck and kicked her during the melee. The Ozaukee County district attorney investigated and decided to bring charges against Gary George for misdemeanor battery and disorderly conduct. Gary George sought to negotiate a deal with his ex-wife, agreeing on final terms for their divorce in exchange for her agreement to drop the criminal complaint against him. The district attorney, however, was not a party to the agreement and refused to end the criminal case, and the judge overseeing the case later determined that the district attorney was not bound by the agreement. Trial motions stretched through much of 1992, before finally resulting in a jury acquittal in October. Despite his legal problems, George did not face an opponent in either the primary or the general election in 1992. Despite having no opponent, George raised campaign funds and paid thousands of dollars to a company headed by a close friend.

=== 1993–1997 fraud investigation ===
George came under criminal investigation again in 1993 after a check-cashing company that he had founded defaulted. State banking examiners subsequently discovered a $100,000 shortfall in the accounts of the company, known as First Currency Exchange, and referred the matter to the Milwaukee County District Attorney. The company separately came under investigation by the Federal Bureau of Investigation and Internal Revenue Service for an alleged check kiting scheme. George had founded the company in 1983 and claimed that he turned over control to his brother, Mark, in 1984, to avoid conflicts of interest with his legislative duties. Several former employees of the company, however, attested that Gary George had retained total control of the company. One employee stated: "We took our orders from Gary. Gary made all of the decisions about First Currency. All of those decisions were final." Shortly after the reports of the criminal investigation, George was named in two lawsuits against the company by banks who had lent money to the business. Later that year, George sued Milwaukee Checkcashers, the company which had agreed to acquire ownership of First Currency Exchange around the time of the default. George alleged that the financial trouble had been caused by Milwaukee Checkcashers' delay in paying off a loan in violation of the terms of the sale. The formal completion of the sale, however, was held up over technical disputes. The state ethics board also began its own investigation and, in September 1995, recommended criminal charges for failing to disclose his interest in and income from the business.

Despite the criminal and ethical problems, George again faced no opposition in his run for re-election in 1996. The 1996 election resulted in the Democrats regaining a one-seat majority in the Senate, but George became livid after the Democratic leadership refused to reappoint him as chairman of the Joint Finance Committee. Before the start of the 1997 session, George took the extraordinary step of negotiating with the Republican minority caucus in an attempt to obtain his desired leadership position. George ultimately could not reach an agreement with the Republicans, as he would not agree to join the Republican Party. But George never fully reconciled with Democratic leader Charles Chvala, and their feud would nurture a schism in the caucus that would hamstring the Democratic agenda in the Legislature for the next four years. In 1998, George quoted United States Supreme Court justice Clarence Thomas, saying that Chvala had engaged in a "high-tech lynching" against him. The Dane County district attorney investigating George was appointed a Wisconsin circuit court judge by Governor Tommy Thompson in 1997 before he resolved the case, the Republican that Thompson appointed to fill the district attorney's office continued to neglect the case. George ultimately never faced federal charges from the First Currency affair, but he did eventually face a tax judgement against him from the Wisconsin Department of Revenue in 2011.

=== First gubernatorial campaign (1998) ===
In June 1998, George announced his campaign for Governor of Wisconsin, running in the Democratic primary. His opponent in the race was political newcomer, Madison lawyer Ed Garvey, who was best known for his role as an attorney for the NFL players' union. Garvey had rallied Democrats, unions, and related interest groups against the Republican incumbent Tommy Thompson, who was seeking a fourth term as governor, but George accused him of being another member of the "Madison boys club" that he alleged held undue power over the Democratic Party of Wisconsin. Throughout the primary, George faced accusations that his campaign was intended to derail the Democratic ticket as a favor to Thompson. George ultimately only received 20% of the primary vote, and Garvey was badly beaten in the general election, receiving only 39% of the vote.

The 1998 election also gave Republicans control of the state Assembly, but left Democrats with a one-seat majority in the Senate. Democratic leaders in the Senate elected to try to reconcile with George, rather than risk him switching parties and giving Republicans full control of state government. They made him president pro tempore of the Senate, chairman of the Senate judiciary committee, and co-chair of the Joint Legislative Audit Committee.

In December 1998, Dane County district attorney Diane Nicks announced she was turning over Gary George's five-year old ethics investigation to the Attorney General of Wisconsin Jim Doyle.

=== Second gubernatorial campaign (2002) ===
After reconciling with Chvala and Senate Democrats, George had a productive session in the 94th Wisconsin Legislature, speaking in favor of Wisconsin Public Television, firearm trigger locks, employment waivers for certain food stamp recipients, and emergency legislation for dairy farmers. By the fall of 2000, George had begun forming an exploratory committee to run for governor again in the 2002 election. George campaigned extensively around the state through 2001 and 2002, but ultimately he did not make the ballot for the Democratic Primary. The state elections board determined that at least 221 names or addresses on his nominating petitions were falsified. Although the petitions were obviously flawed, some in the state political media saw the involvement of a former Charles Chvala aide as an indication that their old feud had been renewed.

Allies of George also blamed his Milwaukee rival in the race, congressman Tom Barrett. George threw his support behind Jim Doyle, delivering a significant portion of the African American vote in southeastern Wisconsin in both the primary and general elections.

=== Second recall campaign (2003) ===
Early in the 2003 legislative term, a sharp conflict emerged between the new Democratic governor Jim Doyle and the Republican legislature over a gambling regulation bill. Traditionally, the governor had a free hand in negotiating gaming agreements with the 11 Indian nations which operated casinos in Wisconsin. With a Democrat now in the governor's office, the Republican legislature passed a bill to require legislative approval of such gaming agreements. Doyle vetoed the Republican bill, saying that such a law would make it impossible for the state to renew gaming contracts. Republicans were determined to override the veto with Democratic crossover votes. Ultimately, the veto override fell one vote short in the Senate, with George voting alongside the Republicans.

After all of the controversies of his career, this veto override vote would be the last straw. The vote was unpopular in his district, but more importantly it caused a schism with Milwaukee's powerful black media mogul Jerrel Jones. Years earlier, he had lamented Gary George as one of the state's most gifted black politicians, but one who was just too interested in making money. Nevertheless, Jones had loyally supported and defended George through his many controversies. Jones was owner of the Milwaukee Courier and WVON radio station, and also a member of the Forest County Potawatomi Community Foundation, which distributed millions in charitable funds from gambling profits. Jones leveraged his wealth and his media operation to launch a recall campaign against George. At the time, Jones stated, "You could probably name 20 or 30 things he probably should have been recalled for. It's an accumulation of 20 years of doing nothing for the community and doing everything for Gary George."

The Jones-backed recall campaign turned in 14,395 signatures, more than 150% of the required total. Like the 1986 recall, George attempted to throw out enough signatures to invalidate the petitions, but this time the numbers were insurmountable. On July 9, 2003, the state elections board ruled that the recall campaign had collected enough valid signatures to force a recall election, making George the second recalled state senator in Wisconsin history. George contested the petition signatures all the way to the Wisconsin Supreme Court, but the court ultimately ruled against him.

At the recall primary in October 2003, George was soundly beaten by longtime state representative Spencer Coggs.

== Federal conspiracy charges (2004) ==
Just a month after losing the recall election, George was indicted in federal court for an elaborate conspiracy in which he was alleged to have received kickbacks from individuals and organizations to which he directed state and federal funds. He was also charged with using his state legislative aides for personal errands and other non-official business. Mark E. Sostarich, a lawyer who had long worked with and for George, pleaded guilty in the conspiracy and cooperated with the United States attorney, Steven M. Biskupic. Two months later, George entered a guilty plea and agreed to cooperate with prosecutors on further investigation into the scheme.

At his sentencing, George brought five boxes of plaques and awards to demonstrate his civic commitment. On August 5, 2004, United States district judge Rudolph T. Randa sentenced George to four years in federal prison.

The investigation ultimately brought down several other lawmakers, including George's longtime antagonist, Charles Chvala.

George ultimately served about three years in prison, and was then discharged to a halfway house. During that time, George was also implicated in the Vang Pao Laotian coup plot, stemming from a corrupt relationship he maintained with leaders in the Wisconsin Hmong community. George was never charged in the Laotian plot.

== Later years ==
In 2008, the Wisconsin Supreme Court ruled that George would be eligible to re-apply for his license to practice law. He ultimately regained his license in 2010.

George's tax problems stemming from the 1993 collapse of First Currency Exchange finally caught up to him in 2011, with the Wisconsin Department of Revenue seeking $91,000 in back taxes.

George made a bid for a return to political office in 2014, when he launched a primary challenge against his former state senate colleague, U.S. representative Gwen Moore. At the time, he stated he was running "in response to citizen demands for stronger leadership from Milwaukee's political community." He lost badly in the August 2014 primary, receiving just 29% of the vote. He ran again in 2016 and 2018, with similar results.

George continues to work as a lawyer in southeast Wisconsin.

== Personal life and family ==
Gary George married Mary Cook in 1978. They had two sons together before their messy divorce in 1990–1991. Mary ultimately remarried with Peter Igel, who was the other person involved in the criminal battery case in 1991.

He subsequently married Patricia Schulz. He had two more children with his second wife. They now reside in Grafton, Wisconsin.

== Electoral history ==
=== Wisconsin Senate (1980–2003) ===
Year	Election	Date	Elected				Defeated				Total	Plurality
1980	Primary	Sep. 9	Gary R. George	Democratic	3,868	60.04%	Monroe Swan (inc)	Dem.	2,574	39.96%	6,442	1,294
1980	General	Nov. 4	Gary R. George	Democratic	28,961	88.40%	Joseph M. Barrington	Rep.	3,800	11.60%	32,761	25,161
1984	Primary	Sep. 11	Gary R. George (inc)	Democratic	5,466	73.76%	Monroe Swan	Dem.	1,691	22.82%	7,411	3,775
1984	Primary	Sep. 11	Gary R. George (inc)	Democratic	5,466	73.76%	Robert E. Lashley	Dem.	254	3.43%	7,411	3,775
1984	General	Nov. 6	Gary R. George (inc)	Democratic	47,719	100.0%					47,719	47,719
1988	General	Nov. 8	Gary R. George (inc)	Democratic	38,087	100.0%					38,087	38,087
1992	General	Nov. 3	Gary R. George (inc)	Democratic	35,558	100.0%					35,558	35,558
1996	General	Nov. 5	Gary R. George (inc)	Democratic	29,236	100.0%					29,236	29,236
2000	General	Nov. 7	Gary R. George (inc)	Democratic	38,812	99.17%					39,135	38,489
2003	Recall Primary	Oct. 21	Spencer Coggs	Democratic	4,538	64.69%	Gary R. George (inc)	Dem.	2,477	35.31%	7,015	2,061

=== U.S. Senator (1986) ===
United States Senate Election in Wisconsin, 1986
Party	Candidate	Votes	%	±%
Democratic Primary, September 9, 1986
Democratic	Edward R. Garvey	126,408	47.60%	
Democratic	Matthew J. Flynn	101,777	38.33%	
Democratic	Gary R. George	29,485	11.10%	
Democratic	Roman R. Blenski	7,890	2.97%	
Plurality		24,631	9.28%	
Total votes		265,560	100.0%	

=== Wisconsin Governor (1998) ===
Wisconsin Gubernatorial Election, 1998
Party	Candidate	Votes	%	±%
Democratic Primary, September 8, 1998
Democratic	Edward R. Garvey	175,082	79.98%	
Democratic	Gary R. George	43,830	20.02%	
Plurality		131,252	59.96%	
Total votes		218,912	100.0%	+79.56%

=== U.S. House (2014, 2016, 2018) ===
Year	Election	Date	Elected				Defeated				Total	Plurality
2014	Primary	Aug. 12	Gwen Moore (inc)	Democratic	52,413	70.91%	Gary R. George	Dem.	21,242	28.74%	73,912	31,171
2016	Primary	Aug. 9	Gwen Moore (inc)	Democratic	55,256	84.49%	Gary R. George	Dem.	10,013	15.31%	65,397	45,243
2018	Primary	Aug. 14	Gwen Moore (inc)	Democratic	76,991	88.86%	Gary R. George	Dem.	9,468	10.93%	86,640	67,523

Wisconsin Senate
Preceded by Monroe Swan	Member of the Wisconsin Senate from the 6th district January 5, 1981 – November 18, 2003	Succeeded by Spencer Coggs
Preceded by Gwen Moore	President pro tempore of the Wisconsin Senate; January 4, 1999 – January 6, 2003	Succeeded by Robert T. Welch
