= Ed Garvey =

American lawyer and politician (1940–2017)

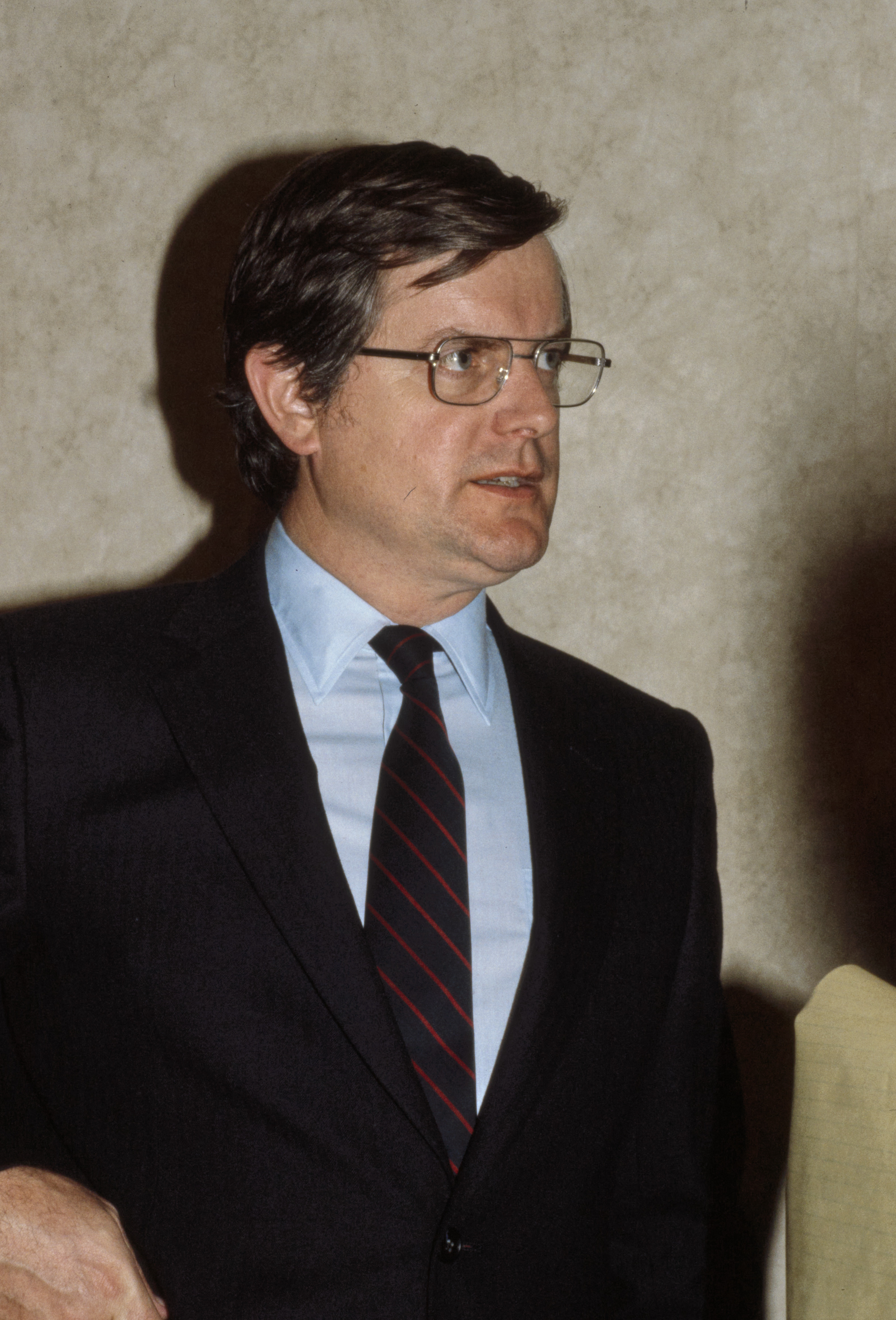
- Garvey in 1982

Personal details
- Born: Edward Robert Garvey; April 18, 1940 Burlington, Wisconsin, U.S.
- Died: February 22, 2017 (aged 76) Verona, Wisconsin, U.S.
- Party: Democratic
- Education: University of Wisconsin, Madison (BA, JD)

Military service
- Allegiance: United States
- Branch/service: United States Army

Edward Robert Garvey (April 18, 1940 – February 22, 2017) was an American lawyer, activist, and Democratic politician from Wisconsin. He was executive director of the National Football League Players Association (players' union) from 1971 to 1983. He also ran unsuccessfully for United States Senate (1986 and 1988) and Governor of Wisconsin (1998). Later in life he organized the first "Fighting Bob Fest", an annual gathering of progressive activists in Wisconsin.

== Background ==
Garvey graduated from the University of Wisconsin (now the University of Wisconsin–Madison) and spent two years in the U.S. Army; he then returned to Madison and entered the University of Wisconsin Law School, where he earned a Juris Doctor degree.

== Law and union work ==
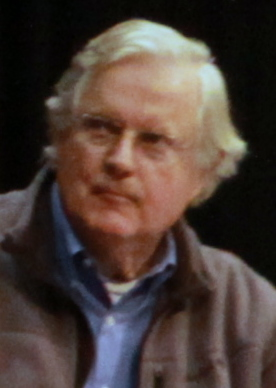
Garvey at the 2011 Fighting Bob Fest

Soon after graduation, Garvey joined Lindquist & Vennum, a Minneapolis law firm. The firm worked for the National Football League Players Association (NFLPA), the labor organization representing the professional American football players in the National Football League (NFL), and in 1970 Garvey was assigned to counsel union president John Mackey regarding negotiations on a new four year contract with the league's owners. Garvey was later offered the position of executive director in the now-certified NFLPA in 1971.

Garvey served as its executive director until 1983, through two strikes (in 1974 and 1982) and frequently invoking antitrust legislation in his many court battles with the league. Garvey directed the NFLPA though a series of court battles that led, in 1975, to the ruling in Mackey v. NFL that antitrust laws applied to the NFL's restrictions on player movement. In 1976, armed with leverage regarding player movement from team to team, Garvey and the union won major concessions from the owners. Garvey's negotiations with the league exchanged the players' threat of pursuing a system of unfettered free agency for an improved package of player benefits.

The NFLPA became recognized by the owners as a full-fledged National Labor Relations Board union, and damages totaling $13.65 million were awarded to past and present players for antitrust violations against them.

== After leaving the NFLPA ==
After leaving the NFLPA, Garvey served as deputy attorney general in Wisconsin under Bronson La Follette, serving as the number-two official in the Wisconsin Department of Justice and specializing in environmental issues. Garvey also became a prominent leader with Wisconsin labor groups, particularly the Paperworkers Union (now United Steelworkers) in contract disputes with International Paper.

He organized the Fighting Bob Fest, named for Robert M. La Follette.

== Political career ==
In 1986, Garvey ran for the U.S. Senate from Wisconsin, losing to Republican incumbent Bob Kasten by a small margin after a very bitter election. In an unsuccessful bid for Wisconsin governor in 1998 against three-term incumbent Tommy Thompson, Garvey sought to highlight campaign finance reform and limited contributions to his campaign to a fixed amount per donor. Thompson won by a wide margin.

Garvey was the editor and publisher of the political website FightingBob.com, which focused on Wisconsin and national issues from a progressive perspective. He regularly appeared on the local NPR national public radio affiliate WHAD to provide a progressive viewpoint on a variety of topics.

== Death ==
Garvey died of complications from Parkinson's disease at a nursing home in Verona, Wisconsin.

== Electoral history ==
=== U.S. Senate (1986) ===
United States Senate Election in Wisconsin, 1986
Party	Candidate	Votes	%	±%
Democratic Primary, September 9, 1986
Democratic	Edward R. Garvey	126,408	47.60%	
Democratic	Matthew J. Flynn	101,777	38.33%	
Democratic	Gary R. George	29,485	11.10%	
Democratic	Roman R. Blenski	7,890	2.97%	
Plurality		24,631	9.28%	
Total votes		265,560	100.0%	
General Election, November 4, 1986
Republican	Robert W. Kasten (inc)	754,473	50.91%	
Democratic	Edward R. Garvey	702,963	47.44%	
Independent	Peter Y. Taylor	19,266	1.30%	
Socialist Workers	Margo Storsteen	2,926	0.20%	
Independent	Eugene A. Hem	2,234	0.15%	
Plurality		51,510	3.48%	
Total votes		1,481,862	100.0%	
Republican hold				

=== U.S. Senate (1988) ===
United States Senate Election in Wisconsin, 1988
Party	Candidate	Votes	%	±%
Democratic Primary, September 13, 1988
Democratic	Herb Kohl	249,226	46.76%	
Democratic	Tony Earl	203,479	38.18%	
Democratic	Edward R. Garvey	55,225	10.36%	
Democratic	Doug La Follette	19,819	3.72%	
Democratic	Edmond C. Hou-Seye	5,040	0.95%	
	Scattering	215	0.04%	
Plurality		45,747	8.58%	
Total votes		533,004	100.0%	

=== Wisconsin Governor (1998) ===
Wisconsin Gubernatorial Election, 1998
Party	Candidate	Votes	%	±%
Democratic Primary, September 8, 1998
Democratic	Edward R. Garvey	175,082	79.98%	
Democratic	Gary R. George	43,830	20.02%	
Plurality		131,252	59.96%	
Total votes		218,912	100.0%	+79.56%
General Election, November 3, 1998
Republican	Tommy Thompson (inc) & Scott McCallum (inc)	1,047,716	59.66%	−7.56pp
Democratic	Edward R. Garvey & Barbara Lawton	679,553	38.70%	+7.82pp
Libertarian	Jim Mueller & James Dean	11,071	0.63%	−0.11pp
U.S. Taxpayers	Edward J. Frami & Thomas R. Rivers	10,269	0.58%	−0.00pp
Independent	Mike Mangan	4,985	0.28%	
Independent	A-ja-mu Muhammad & Vida Harley Bridges	1,604	0.09%	
Green	Jeffrey L. Smith & R. Smith	14	0.00%	
	Scattering	802	0.05%	+0.00pp
Plurality		368,163	20.97%	-15.39pp
Total votes		1,756,014	100.0%	+12.29%
Republican hold				

== Sources ==
- "Garvey McNeil & McGillivray, S.C. Biography". Archived from the original on 2009-07-25.
- Archived FightingBob, Garvey's blog.

Party political offices
Preceded by Gaylord Nelson	Democratic nominee for U.S. Senator from Wisconsin (Class 3); 1986	Succeeded by Russ Feingold
Preceded by Charles Chvala	Democratic nominee for Governor of Wisconsin; 1998	Succeeded by Jim Doyle
