= Bob Kasten =

American politician (born 1942)

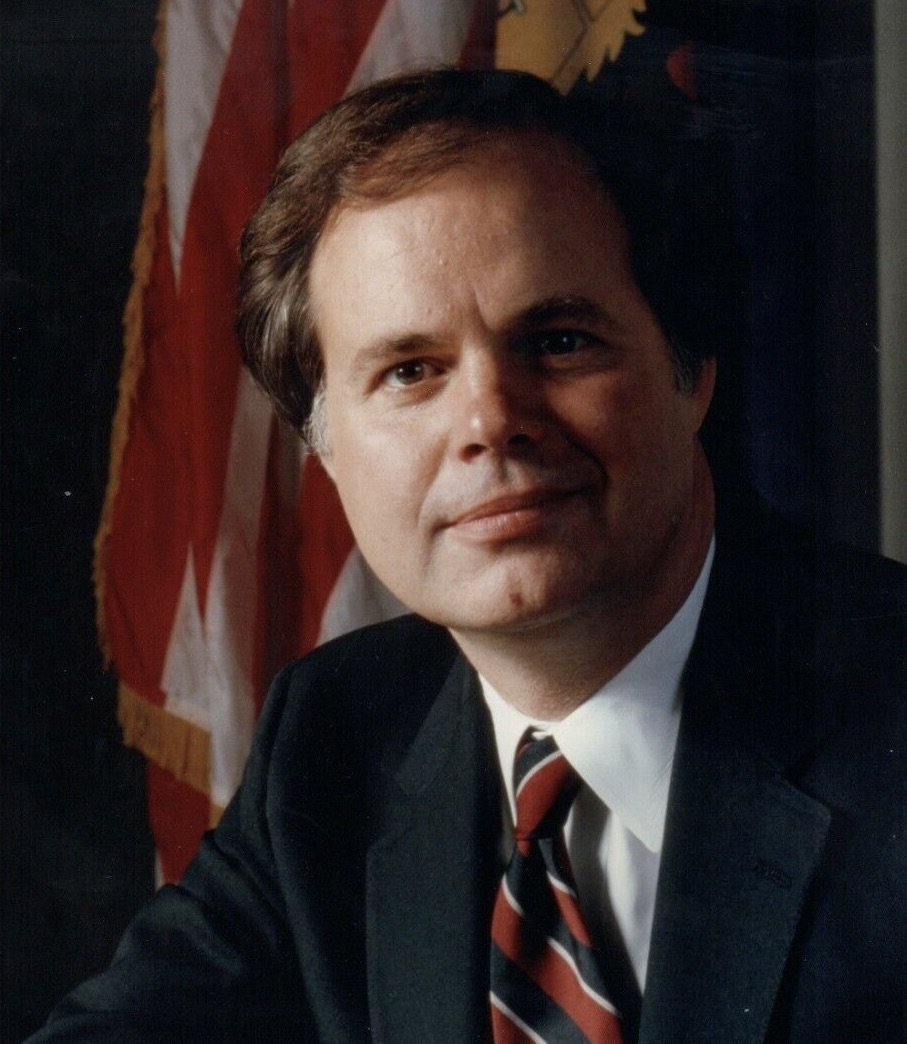

United States Senator from Wisconsin
- In office January 3, 1981 – January 3, 1993
- Preceded by: Gaylord Nelson
- Succeeded by: Russ Feingold

Member of the U.S. House of Representatives from Wisconsin's 9th district
- In office January 3, 1975 – January 3, 1979
- Preceded by: Glenn R. Davis
- Succeeded by: Jim Sensenbrenner

Member of the Wisconsin Senate from the 4th district
- In office January 1, 1973 – January 3, 1975
- Preceded by: Nile Soik
- Succeeded by: Jim Sensenbrenner

Personal details
- Born: Robert Walter Kasten Jr. June 19, 1942 (age 84) Milwaukee, Wisconsin, U.S.
- Party: Republican
- Spouses: Eva Nimmons; Sarah Kasten
- Education: University of Arizona (BA); Columbia University (MBA)

Military service
- Allegiance: United States
- Branch/service: United States Air Force; Wisconsin Air National Guard
- Years of service: 1967–1972
- Rank: 1st Lieutenant, ANG
- Unit: 128th Air Refueling Wing

Robert Walter Kasten Jr. (born June 19, 1942) is an American government affairs consultant, lobbyist, and former Republican politician from Wisconsin. He served 12 years as a United States senator, representing Wisconsin from 1981 to 1993, and served four years in the U.S. House of Representatives, representing Wisconsin's 9th congressional district from 1975 to 1979. He was an unsuccessful candidate in the Republican gubernatorial primary in 1978. Since leaving elected office, he founded Kasten & Company, a Washington, D.C., consulting firm specializing in assisting international businesses in navigating American trade and regulatory policies.

== Early life and education ==
Bob Kasten was born in Milwaukee, Wisconsin, and was raised through childhood in the Milwaukee area. He attended Milwaukee Country Day School in Whitefish Bay, Wisconsin, but transferring to The Choate School (now Choate Rosemary Hall) in Wallingford, Connecticut, where he graduated in 1960. He earned his bachelor's degree in 1964 from the University of Arizona, and went on to obtain his M.B.A. from Columbia Business School in 1966.

After earning his master's degree, he worked briefly at Genesco, in Nashville, Tennessee, before returning to Wisconsin and serving as an assistant factory superintendent for the Gilbert Shoe Company in Thiensville, Wisconsin. At the time, his father was the president of the Gilbert Shoe Company, and in 1969, Kasten Jr. was promoted to vice president of marketing and development for the company. In Wisconsin, he also served as a personnel officer in the Wisconsin Air National Guard from 1967 to 1972, serving with the 128th Air Refueling Wing.

== Political career ==
Kasten was active in local civic groups, particularly the Junior Chamber of Commerce; he began attending Republican State Conventions in 1969, serving as a delegate from Ozaukee County.

He made his first bid for elected office in 1970, running for Wisconsin State Assembly in Milwaukee County's 9th Assembly district, challenging Democratic incumbent Robert L. Jackson Jr. The Milwaukee 9th district at the time comprised one ward of the north side of the city of Milwaukee and most of the neighboring city of Glendale, Wisconsin. Kasten was defeated by Jackson in the general election, receiving just 38% of the vote.

In the spring of 1972, Kasten was elected an alternate delegate to the 1972 Republican National Convention. Around the same time, he was appointed state youth vote coordinator for President Richard Nixon's re-election campaign in Wisconsin. Just a few months later, however, he resigned his position with the Nixon campaign and announced that he would launch a primary challenge against incumbent Republican state senator Nile Soik. Wisconsin had undergone a dramatic redistricting in 1972, and Soik's 4th Senate district had been significantly redrawn. Formerly anchored in Milwaukee's northern suburbs, the new district sprawled from northern Milwaukee County through much of conservative Washington County. Kasten attacked Soik from the right on taxes, spending, and business climate, and criticized Soik's support for a budget compromise with Democratic governor Patrick Lucey. Kasten won the primary with 55% of the vote, and went on to defeat Democrat Bruce Lowe with 61% of the general election vote.

=== U.S. Congress ===
In 1974, Kasten was elected to the United States House of Representatives after defeating incumbent Glenn R. Davis in the Republican primary election. He was reelected in 1976. He ran for governor of Wisconsin in 1978, but lost the Republican nomination to Lee S. Dreyfus, who went on to win the general election.

=== U.S. Senate ===
Kasten ran for the United States Senate in 1980 and narrowly defeated Democrat long-term incumbent Gaylord Nelson. The victory was propelled in part by the popularity of Ronald Reagan at the top of the Republican ticket. In the Senate, Kasten was an outspoken conservative. He was the first Republican to represent Wisconsin in the U.S. Senate since Alexander Wiley left office in 1963.

In 1985, Kasten was arrested and charged with driving under the influence after a District of Columbia police officer observed him running a red light and driving on the wrong side of the road. The DUI charges were later dropped.

In 1986, Kasten narrowly defeated Democrat Ed Garvey to win a second term after a very bitter campaign, one that was characterized by personal attacks and is remembered as one of the nastiest elections in Wisconsin history. Kasten was defeated by Democratic state Senator Russ Feingold in 1992.

Kasten voted in favor of the bill establishing Martin Luther King Jr. Day as a federal holiday and the Civil Rights Restoration Act of 1987 (as well as to override President Reagan's veto). Kasten voted in favor of the nominations of Robert Bork and Clarence Thomas to the U.S. Supreme Court.

== Later years ==
Since 1993, he has been President of Kasten & Company, a consulting firm.

In July 2007, Kasten joined the presidential campaign of Republican Rudy Giuliani as a foreign policy adviser. He chaired Giuliani's Wisconsin campaign, along with former U.S. Representative Scott Klug and former State Senator Cathy Stepp.

After Giuliani dropped out, Kasten endorsed his close friend and former Senate colleague John McCain. In April 2016, Kasten endorsed Republican frontrunner Donald Trump for president in 2016, becoming part of Trump's foreign policy advisory team.

== Cultural references ==
Writer Mike Baron named a recurring character in his Wisconsin-based comic book Badger after Kasten, then Wisconsin's junior senator. The character, a peg-legged, vampire-hunting pig named "Senator Bob Kasten", made several appearances in the series. A student political party on the University of Wisconsin Madison campus satirically named themselves the "Bob Kasten School of Driving" (a reference to his DUI arrest); it won the campus-wide elections in 1986 and 1987.

== Electoral history ==
=== Wisconsin Assembly (1970) ===
Year	Election	Date	Elected				Defeated				Total	Plurality
1970	General	Nov. 3	Robert L. Jackson Jr. (inc)	Democratic	8,588	62.26%	Robert W. Kasten Jr.	Rep.	5,206	37.74%	13,794	3,382

=== Wisconsin Senate (1972) ===
Year	Election	Date	Elected				Defeated				Total	Plurality
1972	Primary	Sep. 12	Robert W. Kasten Jr.	Republican	10,995	55.22%	Nile Soik (inc)	Rep.	8,918	44.78%	19,913	2,077
1972	General	Nov. 7	Robert W. Kasten Jr.	Republican	37,520	61.20%	Bruce E. Lowe	Dem.	23,788	38.80%	61,308	13,732

=== U.S. House (1974, 1976) ===
Year	Election	Date	Elected				Defeated				Total	Plurality
1974	Primary	Sep. 10	Robert W. Kasten Jr.	Republican	22,749	54.51%	Glenn Robert Davis (inc)	Rep.	17,054	40.86%	41,736	5,695
1974	General	Nov. 5	Robert W. Kasten Jr.	Republican	77,733	52.24%	Lynn Adelman	Dem.	66,071	44.40%	148,804	11,662
1974	General	Nov. 5	Robert W. Kasten Jr.	Republican	77,733	52.24%	William D. Quirk	Amer.	3,037	2.04%	148,804	11,662
1976	General	Nov. 2	Robert W. Kasten Jr. (inc)	Republican	163,791	65.40%	Lynn M. McDonald	Dem.	84,706	33.82%	250,457	79,085

=== Wisconsin Governor (1978) ===
Wisconsin Gubernatorial Election, 1978
Party	Candidate	Votes	%
Republican Primary, September 12, 1978
Republican	Lee S. Dreyfus	197,279	57.91%
Republican	Robert W. Kasten Jr.	143,361	42.09%
Plurality		53,918	15.83%
Total votes		340,640	100.0%

=== U.S. Senate (1980, 1986, 1992) ===
Wisconsin U.S. Senate election, 1980
Party	Candidate	Votes	%	±%
Republican	Bob Kasten	1,106,311	50.2	
Democratic	Gaylord Nelson (incumbent)	1,065,487	48.3	

Wisconsin U.S. Senate election, 1986
Party	Candidate	Votes	%	±%
Republican	Bob Kasten (incumbent)	754,573	50.9	
Democratic	Ed Garvey	702,963	47.4	

Wisconsin U.S. Senate election, 1992
Party	Candidate	Votes	%	±%
Democratic	Russ Feingold	1,290,662	52.6	
Republican	Bob Kasten (incumbent)	1,129,599	46.0	

U.S. House of Representatives
Preceded by Glenn Robert Davis	Member of the U.S. House of Representatives from Wisconsin's 9th congressional district 1975–1979	Succeeded by Jim Sensenbrenner
Party political offices
Preceded by Tom Petri	Republican nominee for U.S. Senator from Wisconsin (Class 3); 1980, 1986, 1992	Succeeded by Mark Neumann
Preceded by Thad Cochran	Vice Chair of the Senate Republican Conference; 1991–1993	Succeeded by Trent Lott
U.S. Senate
Preceded by Gaylord Nelson	U.S. Senator (Class 3) from Wisconsin; 1981–1993; Served alongside: William Proxmire, Herb Kohl	Succeeded by Russ Feingold
Preceded by Rudy Boschwitz	Ranking Member of the Senate Small Business Committee; 1991–1993	Succeeded by Larry Pressler
U.S. order of precedence (ceremonial)
Preceded by Connie Mack III as Former U.S. Senator	Order of precedence of the United States as Former U.S. Senator	Succeeded by Rudy Boschwitz as Former U.S. Senator
