= League of Wisconsin Municipalities =

- Abbreviation: LWM
- Type: Nonprofit, nonpartisan association
- Headquarters: Madison, Wisconsin
- Region served: Wisconsin
- Website: www.lwm-info.org

The League of Wisconsin Municipalities is a nonprofit and nonpartisan association of cities and villages that acts as a lobbying organization and legal resource for Wisconsin municipalities. The League is located in Madison, Wisconsin.
