= 1986 United States Senate election in Wisconsin =

- November 3, 1986
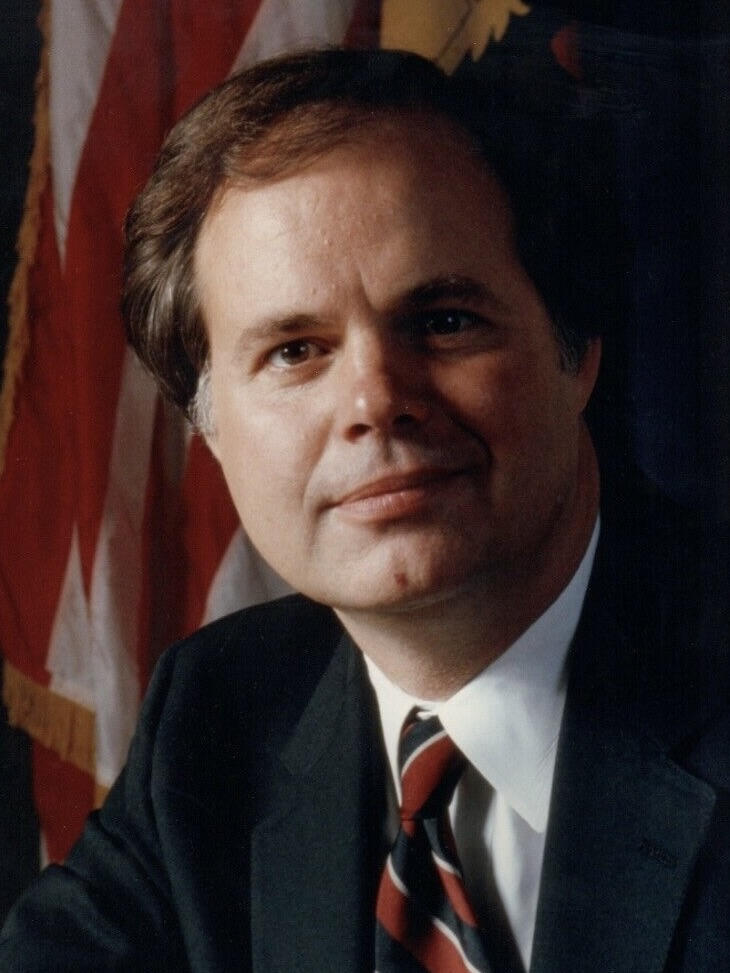

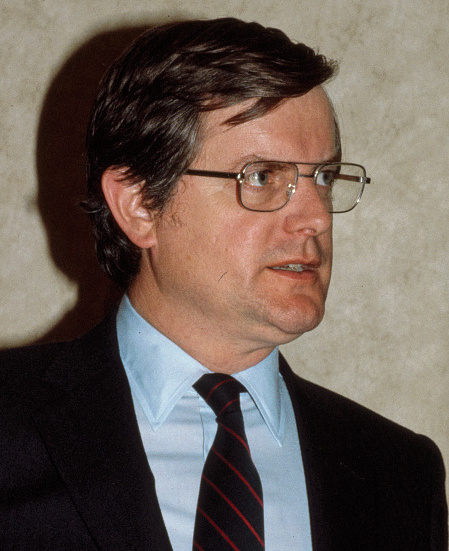
Nominee	Bob Kasten	Ed Garvey
Party	Republican	Democratic
Popular vote	754,573	702,963
Percentage	50.92%	47.44%
- County results Kasten: 50–60% 60–70% Garvey: 50–60%
U.S. senator before election
Bob Kasten
Republican
Elected U.S. Senator
Bob Kasten
Republican

The 1986 United States Senate election in Wisconsin was held on November 3, 1986. Incumbent Republican U.S. Senator Bob Kasten won re-election to a second term. This would be the last time a Republican would win a Senate race in Wisconsin until Ron Johnson in 2010, and the last time that anyone other than Russ Feingold was the Democratic nominee for this seat until 2022.

== Democratic primary ==
=== Candidates ===
- Roman R. Blenski, perennial candidate and former State Senator from Milwaukee
- Matthew J. Flynn, former chair of the Wisconsin Democratic Party
- Ed Garvey, former Deputy Wisconsin Attorney General and executive director of the NFLPA
- Gary George, State Senator from Milwaukee

=== Results ===
Democratic primary results
Party	Candidate	Votes	%
Democratic	Ed Garvey	126,408	47.59%
Democratic	Matthew J. Flynn	101,777	38.31%
Democratic	Gary George	29,485	11.10%
Democratic	Roman R. Blenski	7,890	2.97%
Democratic	Write-ins	79	0.03%
Total votes		265,560	100.00%

== General election ==
=== Results ===
General election results
Party	Candidate	Votes	%
Republican	Bob Kasten (incumbent)	754,573	50.92%
Democratic	Ed Garvey	702,963	47.44%
Independent	Peter Y. Taylor	19,266	1.30%
Socialist Workers	Margo Storsteen	2,926	0.20%
Third Party	Eugene Hem	2,234	0.15%
Total votes		1,481,962	100.00%
Republican hold			

== See also ==
- 1986 United States Senate elections
