= Chris Larson =

21st century American politician, Wisconsin Senator

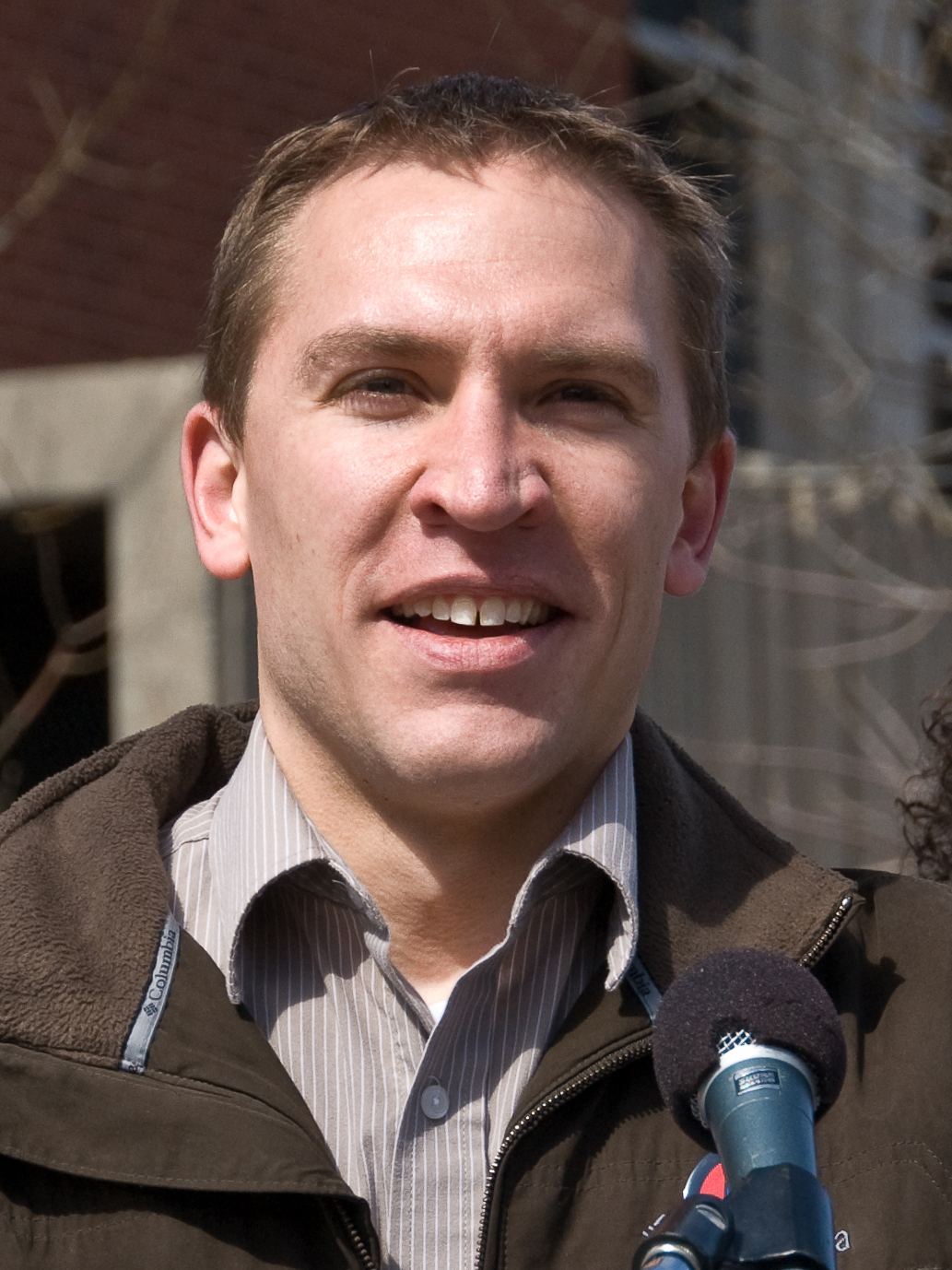
- Larson in 2011

Minority Leader of the Wisconsin Senate
- In office January 3, 2013 – January 5, 2015
- Preceded by: Scott L. Fitzgerald
- Succeeded by: Jennifer Shilling

Member of the Wisconsin Senate from the 7th district
- Incumbent
- Assumed office January 3, 2011
- Preceded by: Jeffrey Plale

Personal details
- Born: November 12, 1980 (age 46) Milwaukee, Wisconsin, U.S.
- Party: Democratic
- Spouse: Jessica Brumm
- Children: 2
- Education: University of Wisconsin, Milwaukee (BA)
- Website: Campaign website State Senate website

Christopher J. Larson (born November 12, 1980) is an American politician who has represented Wisconsin's 7th Senate district in the Wisconsin Senate since 2011. A member of the Democratic Party, he was the Senate minority leader from 2013 through 2014, and currently serves as Senate Democratic caucus chair.

== Early life and career ==
Larson was born and raised in Milwaukee County, Wisconsin. He graduated from St. Thomas More High School in 1999 and earned a bachelor's degree in finance from the University of Wisconsin–Milwaukee with a minor in political science. Before entering politics, Larson was a business manager.

== Career ==
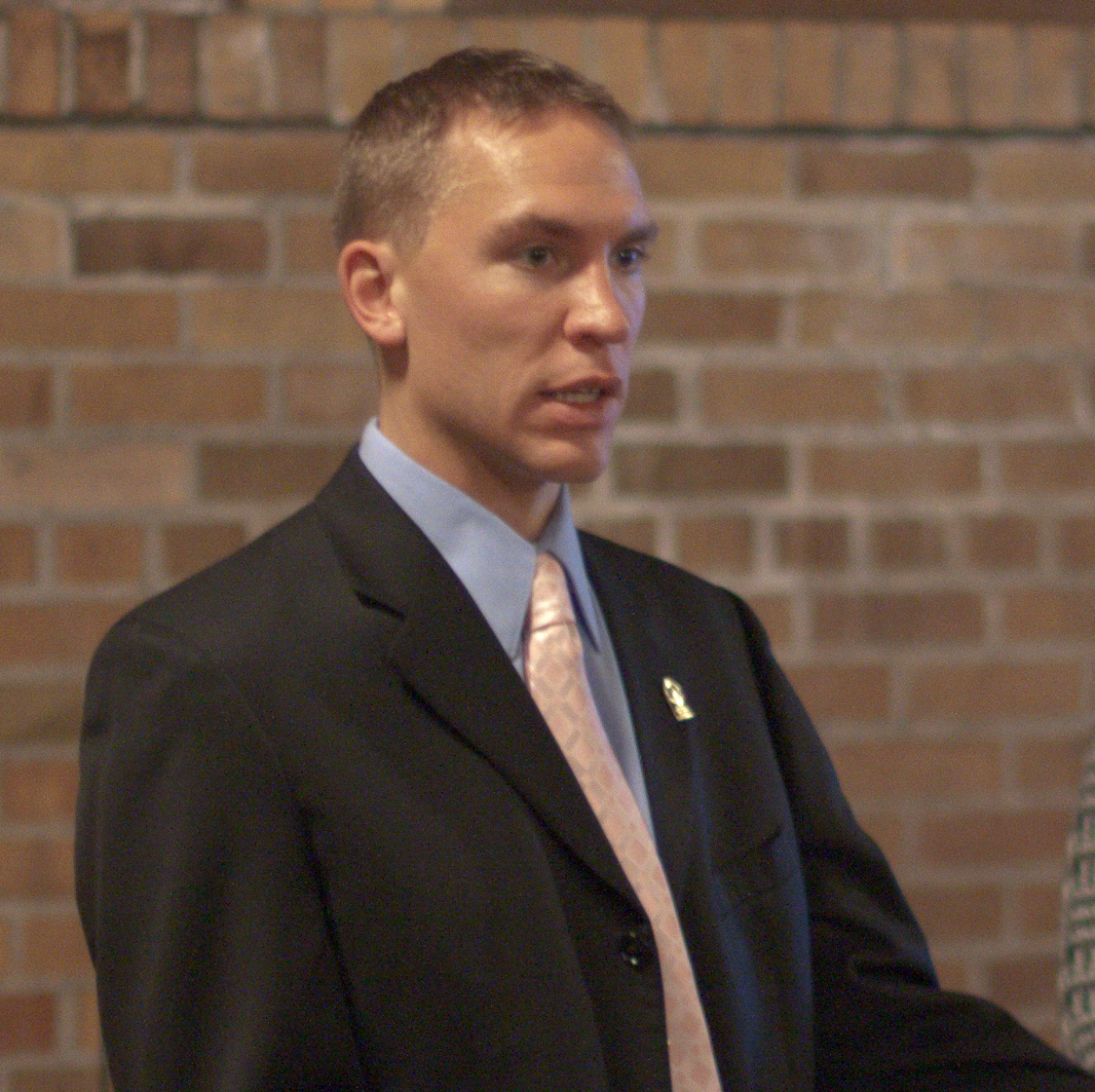
Larson in 2010

=== Milwaukee County supervisor (2009–2011) ===
In April 2008, Larson was elected Milwaukee County supervisor on a platform of improving public transportation, parks and education. As supervisor, he supported economic development efforts near the Milwaukee airport, participated in a coalition to save the Hoan Bridge from destruction and authored legislation to enhance public parks.

=== Wisconsin Senate (2011–present) ===
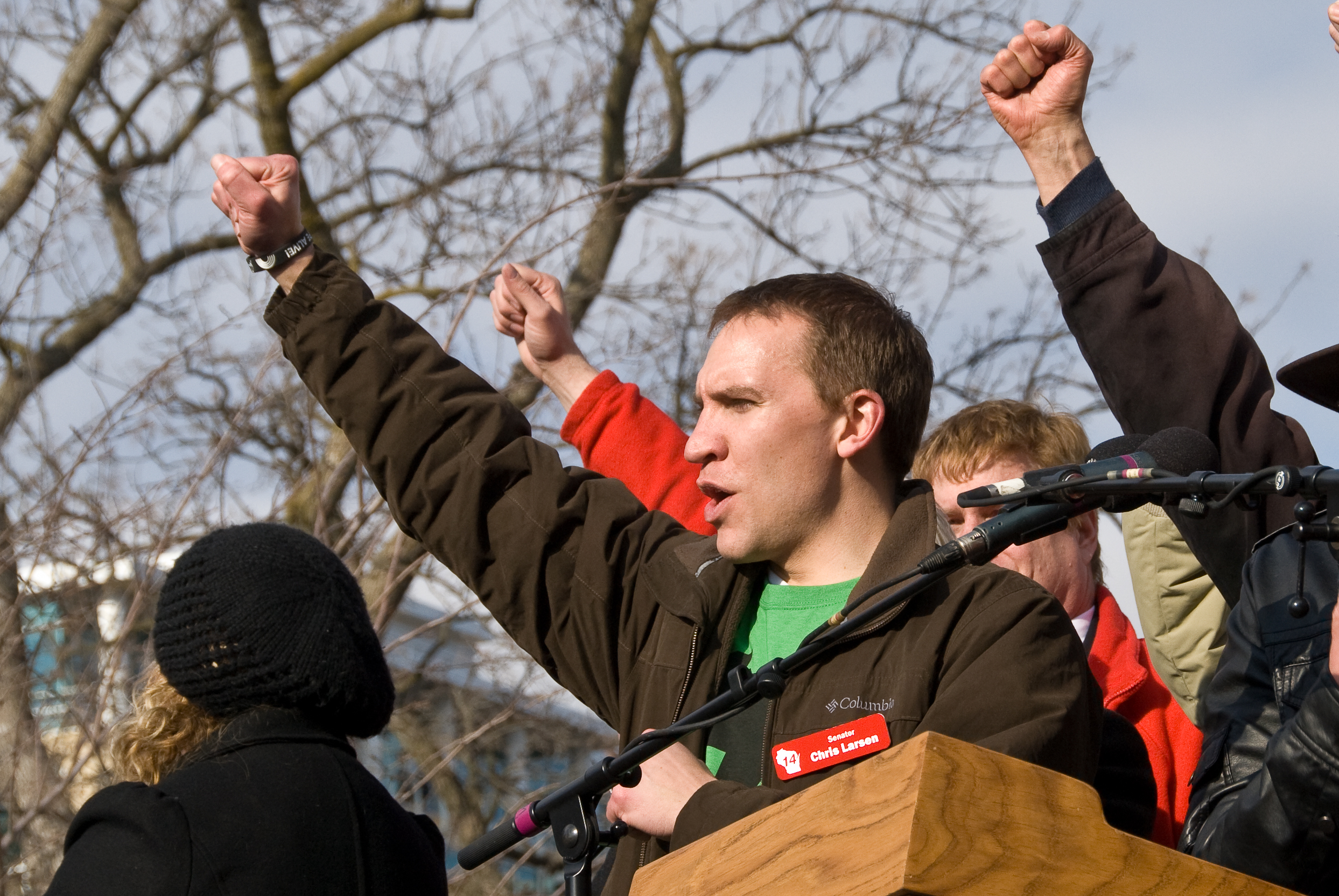
Larson at the protest on March 12, 2011

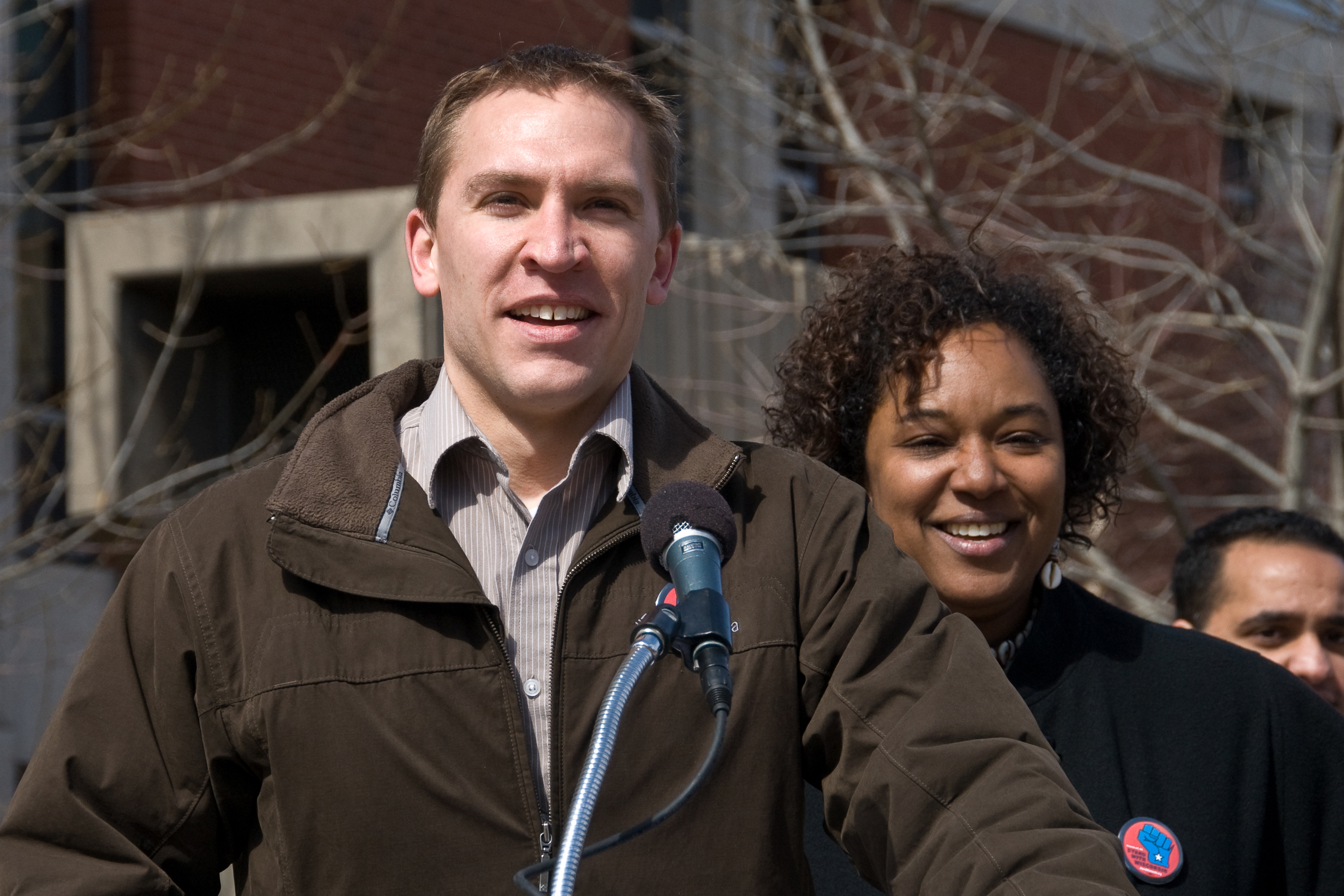
Larson and State Senator Lena Taylor speaking at the protest at UW-Milwaukee on March 13, 2011

==== Elections ====
On September 14, 2010, Larson defeated incumbent Senator Jeffrey Plale in the Wisconsin state senate primary election and defeated Republican Jesse Ripp in the general election on November 2, 2010, becoming the youngest member of the senate. Larson represents the cities of Cudahy, South Milwaukee, St. Francis, Franklin, Oak Creek and Milwaukee.

In 2013, Larson was elected Senate Minority Leader. Following Democrats poor showing in 2014 elections, Larson resigned as Senate Minority Leader on November 11, 2014. Larson was re-elected to the Wisconsin Senate for a fourth term in November 2022.

==== Tenure ====
During the 2011 Wisconsin protests, Larson, along with the 13 other Democratic state senators, left the state to deny the state senate a quorum on Governor Scott Walker's controversial "Budget Repair" legislation. All 14 state senators later returned on March 12.

In the 2011-2012 legislative session, funding for local public schools was cut by $1.6 billion, and during the 2013-2014 session 50% of Wisconsin school districts received less state money than they did under the previous session. Larson supported initiatives to fully restore funding for local public schools.

In February 2013, Democrats introduced a package of six jobs bills, which included funding for technical colleges and required state agencies, as well as state and local governments, to buy from Wisconsin businesses.

Larson fought to accept federal health care money through the Affordable Care Act to strengthen Wisconsin's BadgerCare program since, according to Wisconsin's nonpartisan Legislative Fiscal Bureau, strengthening BadgerCare would expand health care coverage to 85,000 more Wisconsinites, save the state $119 million over the biennium, and create over 10,000 Wisconsin jobs.

Larson and his Democratic colleagues all signed on to a proposed constitutional amendment (2013 SJR 74) to reverse Wisconsin's ban on same-sex marriage. Larson co-sponsored legislation to reinstate laws to prevent workplace discrimination against women, which had been removed from Wisconsin statutes during the 2011-12 legislative session.

Larson introduced legislative proposals during the 2013-2014 Legislative Session to reform Wisconsin's jobs agency, the Wisconsin Economic Development Corporation, which has seen numerous scandals since it was created in 2011, including losing track of $56 million in loans, misuse of taxpayer funds, exaggerated jobs claims, and lack of basic oversight, according to a national report by Good Jobs First.

During the 2015-16 legislative session, Larson introduced numerous proposals aimed at improving public schools. For instance, Larson co-authored a proposal to implement and invest in the community schools model, which provides wraparound services for students, such as providing access to health care and a healthy diet. He introduced legislation to give schools support to provide services for students with disabilities.

In early 2016, Larson and a group of environmental advocates and organizations led a fight against a bill that would have made it easier for Wisconsin water utility systems to be taken over by non-Wisconsin, for-profit companies and corporations. After intense public outrage, the bill was not scheduled for a vote in the Senate and failed to become law. The lead poisoning of families in Flint Michigan galvanized opposition to water privatization in Wisconsin.

For 2020, some of Larson's main legislative issues include public education in Milwaukee, addressing climate change issues, tackling lawmaker corruption, improving access to senior care, and improving infrastructure in areas such as childcare and public transportation. In 2019, Larson has also called for increased regulation of trampoline parks and other amusement parks, which have seen an increase in the number of children injured.

Following President Trump's Executive Order 14187 banning federal funding for any hospital providing gender-affirming care for anyone under 19, Children's Wisconsin Hospital canceled a transgender teenager's appointment to receive hormone therapy. Larson denounced the hospital's decision saying, "Doctors - not politicians should decide what type of care is appropriate for their patients" and called on the hospital to reverse the decision. The next day, the hospital reversed their decision and rescheduled the teenager's appointment.

=== 2020 Milwaukee County executive campaign ===
In November 2019, Larson announced he would run for Milwaukee County executive after incumbent Chris Abele announced he would not seek re-election. Larson came in first in the non-partisan primary but was narrowly defeated in the April 13 general election by David Crowley.

=== 2022 U.S. Senate campaign ===
Larson was briefly a candidate for the United States Senate in 2021. He announced his candidacy on May 26, 2021, but withdrew from the Democratic primary on August 3, 2021, endorsing fellow Milwaukeean Mandela Barnes.

== Personal life ==
Larson lives in Bay View with his wife, Jessica, and their two children.

Larson is a member of the League of Conservation Voters, Sierra Club, Planned Parenthood Advocates of Wisconsin, Bay View Historical Society, Bay View Lions Club, and Arbor Day Foundation.

=== Brushes with the law ===
When Larson was a 19-year-old freshman at the University of Wisconsin–Milwaukee, he was arrested for shoplifting from a supermarket and received a $331 municipal citation, which was later dropped after Larson took a court-ordered class.

Four years later, he was illegally parked in a tow-away zone on Milwaukee's east side. When a tow truck arrived and the driver attached Larson's car to it, Larson sprinted out of a nearby house "yelling and screaming" wildly at the driver. When the driver refused to release his car, Larson climbed inside and then "rode along all the way to the tow yard" while beeping "the car horn continuously." Once they arrived, he refused to get out of his car until lot employees called police. He was cited for disorderly conduct, but the ticket was eventually dropped.

Wisconsin Senate
Preceded by Scott L. Fitzgerald	Minority Leader of the Wisconsin Senate; 2013–2015	Succeeded by Jennifer Shilling
