= Oregon State University College of Liberal Arts =

- Type: Public
- Established: 1973
- Parent institution: Oregon State University
- Dean: Philip Williams
- Undergraduates: +4,500
- Location: Corvallis and Bend, Oregon, United States; 44.564°N 123.279°W
- Colors: Orange and black
- Website: liberalarts.oregonstate.edu

Oregon State University's College of Liberal Arts is a liberal arts college at Oregon State University. The college is located on the Corvallis, Oregon main campus and offers students 66 academic programs. The college of liberal arts awarded just over a thousand undergraduate degrees in 2023, the second most of OSU colleges.

Liberal arts' students may earn a wide range of major and minor degrees by attending classes at one of the three university campuses or studying online. Coursework is taught at the university's main campus, the Oregon State University–Cascades campus in Bend, the OSU Portland Center, and online through OSU's Ecampus. In the spring of 2023, the college included seven departments, employed 290 faculty members, and claimed an enrollment of just over 4,500 students.

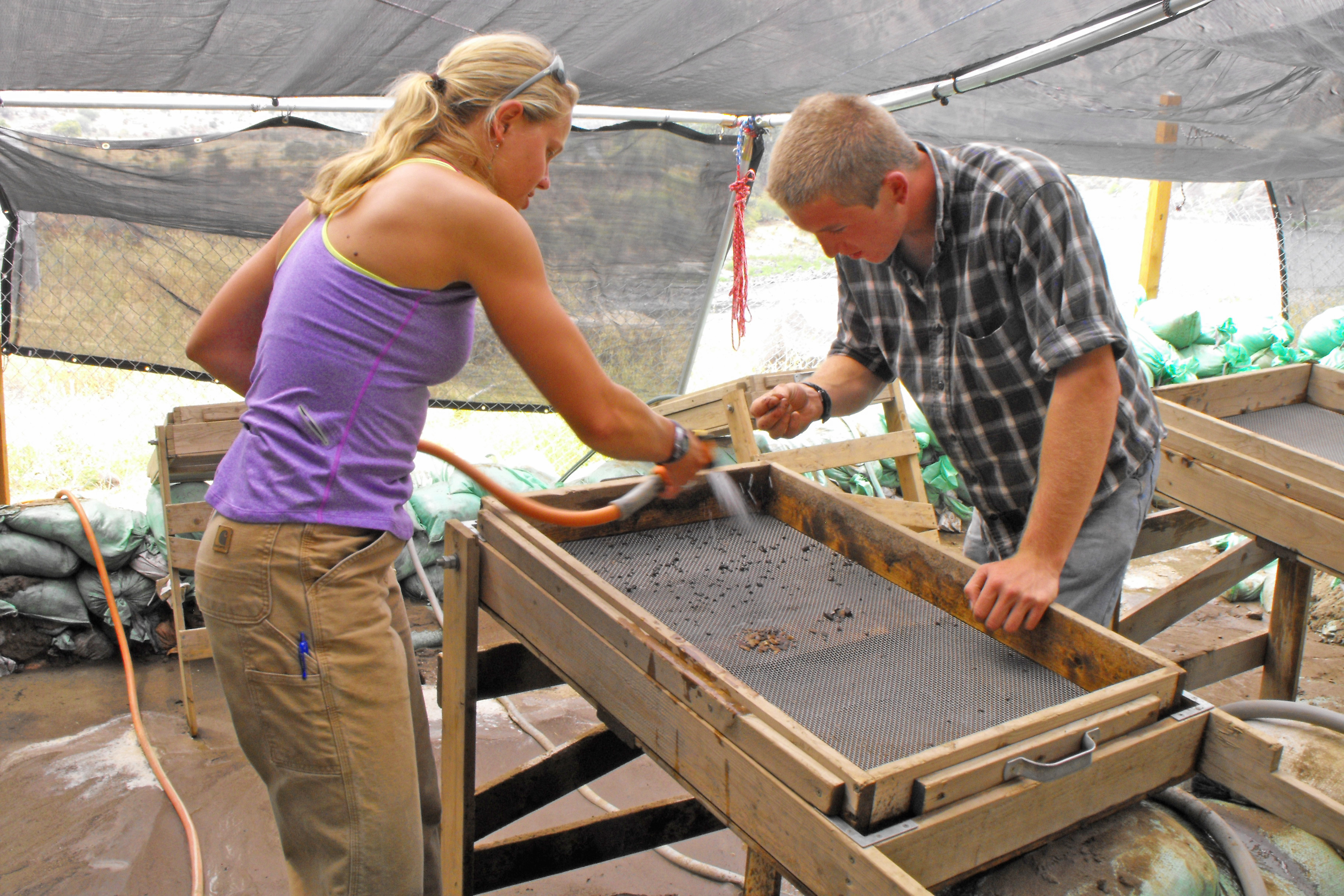
A team of students, led by OSU Archaeology Professor Loren Davis, digs in Idaho. Team members discovered some of the earliest evidence of humans in the Pacific NW.

== Departments ==
- Communication
- History, Philosophy, and Religion
- Language, Culture, and Society
- Psychological Science
- Public Policy
- Visual, Performing, and Design Arts
- Writing, Literature, and Film
- Interdisciplinary (multi-school study) (Note: Optional program.)

== History ==
The OSU Transcontinental Debate Team visiting the White House in 1928.

Oregon State University first offered college-level coursework in liberal arts as early as 1865. Since then, the university has provided students with a wide range of liberal arts courses and degrees.

The university's campus newspaper was first established in 1896 as The Beaver. In 1919, the name was changed to The College Barometer. Journalism courses were first offered as early as 1913. The first school established in a liberal art was the department of music in 1901. The school opened under the management of Gerard Taillandier, an acclaimed organist from Oakland, California Within two years the department of art was added, chaired by professor Farley McLouth.

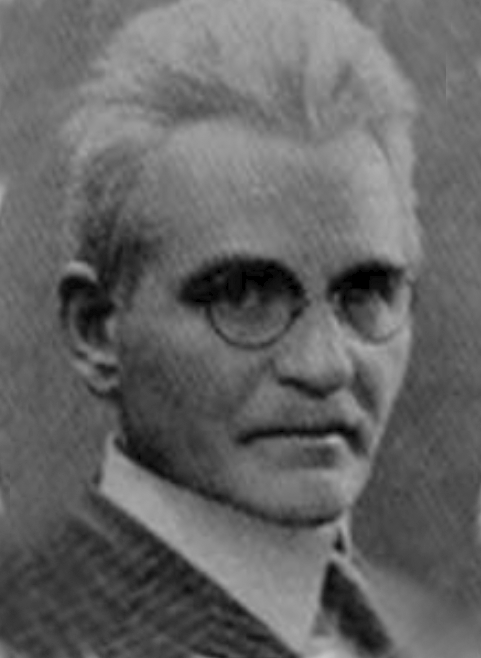
Prof. Farley McLouth served as the first art department chair (1903-1923). McLouth was a recognized American artist, specializing in commercial illustration. He was also an outspoken advocate for women in higher education and the growth and development of art schools in American universities.

Starting in the early 1900s, however, advancements developed during the recent American Industrial Revolution introduced students to new career opportunities in the sciences and technology. According to college records, a reduced student interest and a new state policy requiring the university to focus curricula on the sciences and technology forced administrators to de-emphasize liberal arts' majors in 1914 and over the subsequent four decades. Still, courses in the liberal arts remained an important part of the required core for all majors and were offered as popular electives and select majors throughout this period. The departments of music and art were two departments that persisted over this period. Several early programs in liberal arts were offered through the college of agriculture, but most were grouped under an independent department known as the division of service, in 1919, and the school of basic arts and sciences after 1922. In 1918, the university created a department for industrial journalism. Early journalism students were often assigned to staff the university's statewide agricultural extension bulletins as part of their coursework. The newly created industrial journalism department was first chaired by Frank L. Snow. Over the next three years, the campus paper transitioned from a weekly to a weekday paper and took its current name, "The Daily Barometer." Charles B. Mitchel, a first-year speech professor at OSU, created the speech and theatre departments in 1920. He was also instrumental in bringing Oregon's first public radio station, KFDJ (AM), to the campus. OSU physics instructor Jacob Jordan is credited with building the station's first transmitter in 1923. Journalism student, and later famous WWII correspondent, Webley Edwards served as the first station manager. The call letters were changed to KOAC (AM) in 1925.

Higher education budget shortfalls, created by the Great Depression, reinforced the state's need to reduce OSU's liberal arts programs once again. As a result, the department of industrial journalism was closed in the early 1930s. However, general courses in journalism were still offered at the university through the 1960s. During World War II, majors in liberal arts began to grow in popularity again, as many agriculture and engineering students left college to serve in the military. After the war, returning veterans made up a substantial segment of OSU's student body. Increasingly, these returning students sought degrees in the growing number of liberal art professions.

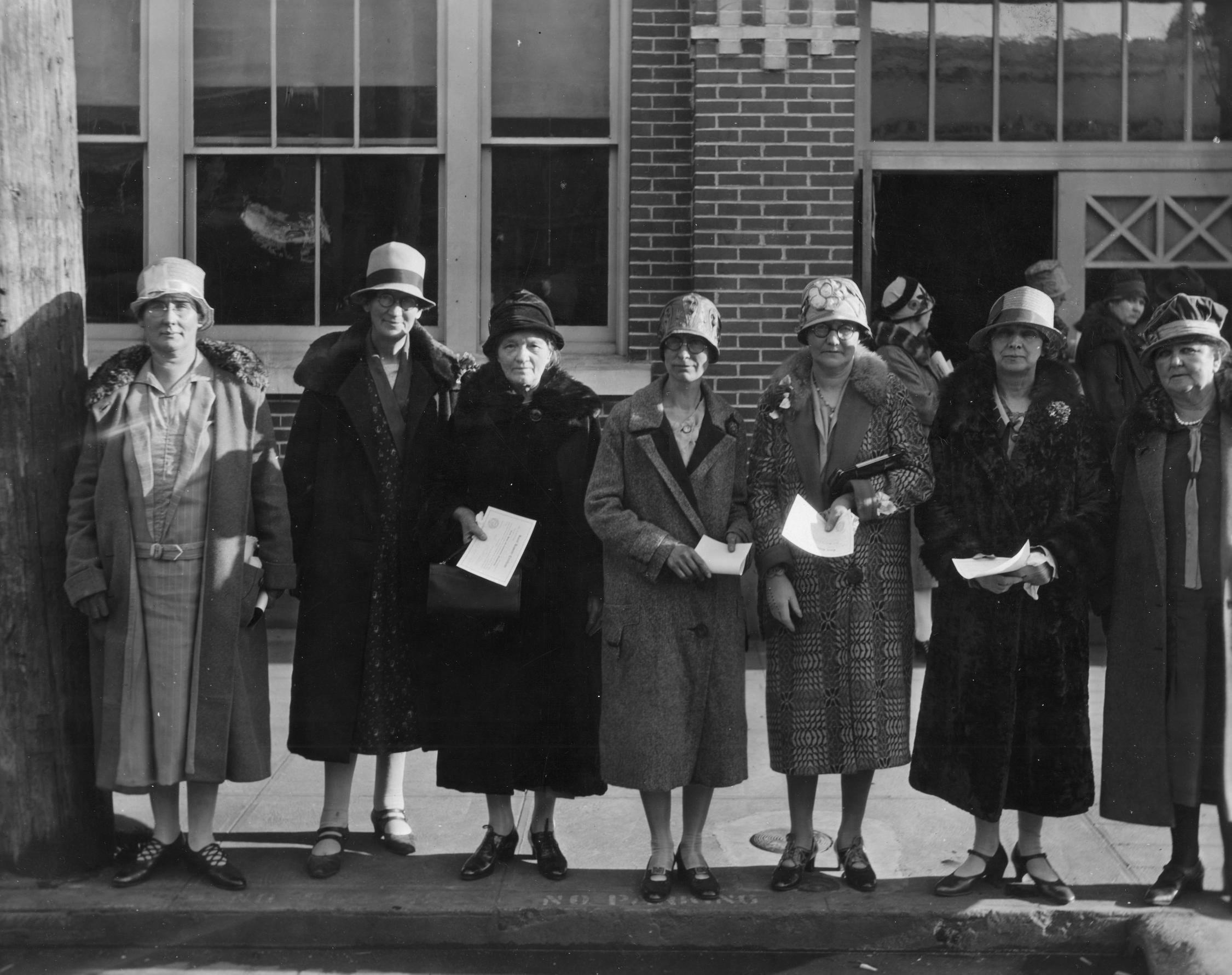
OSU students attending an extension course in journalism in Lebanon, Oregon in 1930.

Television was added to KOAC's programming in 1957 and broadcast studios were constructed on campus, inside Gill Coliseum. The studios were used to broadcast extension courses throughout the state - known as the "School of the Air". Faculty and student participation in KOAC's statewide radio and television broadcasts later spawned a broadcast communications program at OSU, which included its own campus radio and TV stations (1965).

In 1959, then university president A. L. Strand created the first divisional majors in humanities and social sciences. The two divisional majors were combined into a formal school in 1961. Meanwhile, student interest in the liberal arts continued to grow throughout the '60s, as the number of programs and the size of the school expanded. In 1965, the department of English became a formal department at OSU. A year later economics, history, political science and Russian studies were also added as formal departments with bachelor's degree programs. An anthropology department and new technical journalism department were created under the school of humanities and social sciences in 1969. All liberal arts majors were then formalized under a college of liberal arts in 1973. Gordon Gilkey served as the first dean of the college.

In 1971, KOAC became the headquarters for the Oregon Educational and Public Broadcasting Service and then the state's National Public Radio affiliate (1979-1981). Head of the broadcast media communications department, Richard Weinman, was hired as a regular host and contributor for KOAC's statewide newscasts (1970s-1990s). In 1981, Oregon Public Broadcasting was created and the headquarters for the state radio and TV network were relocated from the Corvallis campus to Portland. However, the station remained an important part of the OPB radio network through its closure in 2009 and received two Peabody Awards over its life. The campus radio and TV stations (KBVR), and the campus newspaper continue as student-run programs but now operate as purely extra-curricular organizations under the umbrella of the campus's Orange Media Network.

The first graduate degrees were offered by the college's scientific and technical communications school in 1988. However, doctorates in philosophy and other liberal arts were first offered through the university as early as the 1930s, before being incorporated into the college.

Today, the college of liberal arts makes up one of the largest colleges on campus and claims a number of notable alumni and faculty.

== Academics ==
Oregon State University's College of Liberal Arts offers a wide range of majors, minors, and concentrations within its seven schools. In 2022, the college offered over 66 academic programs across four campuses. U.S. News & World Report ranked the psychological science school's online program first in the nation for 2023. The psychological science school is now the third largest on campus, claiming five percent of the university's total undergraduate enrollment (2023). Over the last seven years, U.S. News & World Report also ranked OSU's Ecampus in the top 10 in the nation for online bachelor's programs, of which, nearly a quarter of those online classes are offered through the college of liberal arts. OSU's Ecampus public policy masters program ranked fourth best in the nation by onlinemastersdegrees.org in 2023.

U.S. News & World Report ranked several college of liberal arts schools as a combined 226th amongst global universities in 2021. U.S. News & World Report no longer provides rankings for all majors offered within a college of liberal arts at "global" universities. Instead, the ranking publication only ranks a select number of "social science and public health" majors offered within these colleges. The most common majors used in their rankings were limited to criminology and criminal justice, English, history, political science, and sociology. In 2021, the college of liberal arts at OSU included seven departments and over 20 majors.

== Student and program awards ==
- 2006, The Daily Barometer photojournalist Peter Strong, sports photography, SPJ National Mark of Excellence winner
- 2014, The Daily Barometer editorial staff, Associated College Press national editorial/opinion story of the year winner
- 2014, KBVR-FM, Best College/University Station (schools with more than 10,000 students), Intercollegiate Broadcasting System Awards.
- 2017, The Daily Barometer, Newspaper Pacemaker Winner.
- 2022, Orange Media Network and a digital arts student, Alan Nguyen, Best Graphic Designer, National Pacemaker Awards.
- 2025, Orange Media Network, Arts and Literature Magazine, Literary Magazines/College Media Association national winner.

== Budget cuts ==
In 1990, Oregon voters passed the historic property-tax-reducing Ballot Measure 5. Passage of the new law dramatically changed Oregon's property taxes, greatly reduced funding for many K-12 schools, and helped to eliminate several popular programs at the Oregon State University College of Liberal Arts. Following passage of the measure, specific schools in the college of liberal arts were targeted for elimination.

Unrelated to passage of the measure, the University of Oregon's board of regents had a long, unsuccessful history of asking the Oregon State Board of Higher Education to eliminate OSU's technical journalism and broadcast media communications programs. The UO board believed they were "duplicative" of programs offered by their own university and made the request numerous times over the previous 70 years. Despite the pressure and claims, the faculty at the college of liberal arts was successful in maintaining both programs for decades, by ensuring their curriculums were distinct and missions uniquely different from programs offered by the University of Oregon. However, the 1991 state-wide budget cuts from passage of Measure 5 gave the board of higher education an opportunity to eliminate both programs, along with religious studies, while also satisfying the UO board of regents. Due to the Oregon State Board of Higher Education's new budgeting, the university's general fund appropriations fell from $117 million in fiscal 1992/93 to $101.2 million for the 1993/94 fiscal year. At the time the technical journalism program was eliminated, it was recognized as the fastest growing school on campus.

Since 2018, the college of liberal arts has offered a minor in applied journalism. The new digital communication arts major is also helping to fill the hole created by the loss of the technical journalism and broadcast media communications programs by introducing media students to the latest news and broadcasting software and technologies. The religious studies major was reinstated in 2018.

== Expansion ==
The college of liberal arts inherited a new, $75-million-dollar, center for the creative arts in 2024. The new addition is named after donor, Patricia Valian Reser, and is located on campus at the corner of 15th and Washington Way.

According to the school of visual, performing and design arts, the 500-seat Patricia Valian Reser Center for the Creative Arts (PRAx) serves as a performance center for all Oregonians and, more specifically, public school systems. One of the main goals of the center is to share art with students living throughout the state when visiting campus.

The center features a large stage to accommodate a range of performances, including everything from solo performances to concerts with 100-person choruses. Backstage and support areas will provide space for teaching, rehearsal and performance. Art gallery space features secure, dramatically lit spaces with appropriate climate control for displaying OSU's art collections and other cutting-edge art shows.

== Notable alumni ==
- Brad Avakian, served in the Oregon House and Senate, elected labor commissioner, psychology (1980-1984).
- Mike Barrett, American sportscaster, former play-by-play announcer for the Portland Trail Blazers, technical journalism (1987-1991).
- Brent Barry, NBA basketball executive, national sports broadcaster, former NBA player and two-time national champion, sociology, (1993–1995).
- Trent Bray, Former head coach of Oregon State Football from 2022-2023, sociology, (2003-2007)
- John Brotherton, actor, played a leading role on the daytime drama One Life to Live, 2007–2010, part in Fuller House 2016–2018, theatre and fine arts (1998–2002).
- Jade Carey, Olympic gold medalist and one of the most decorated U.S. female gymnasts of all time, digital communication (2021-2025).
- Susan Castillo, Oregon senator (1997-2003), state school superintendent, award-winning OPB/Eugene TV news reporter, broadcast media communications (1978-1981)
- Pinto Colvig (Vance DeBar Colvig Sr.) voice acting pioneer at Disney Studios, journalism and art, (1910-1913)
- Geffrey Davis, American poet and professor, 2013 A. Poulin, Jr. Poetry Prize, Anne Halley Poetry Prize, Dogwood Prize in Poetry, Leonard Steinberg Memorial/Academy of American Poets Prize and the Wabash Prize for Poetry, English (2002–2006).
- Webley Edwards, World War II news correspondent & syndicated radio host (Hawaii Calls), journalism (1924–1927).
- David Gilkey, photojournalist, NPR and Detroit Free Press, 2011 Peabody award, 2011 Edward R Murrow award, 2004 Michigan photographer of the year, 2010 George Polk Award, technical journalism (1986–1988).
- Kevin Hagen, actor, best known for role on Emmy Award-winning TV series Little House on the Prairie, political science (1947-1950).
- Christopher Howell, poet, National Endowment for the Arts fellow, English (1964–1968).
- Lisa Jackson, national-bestselling author, her books appear on The New York Times, USA Today, and the Publishers Weekly national bestseller lists, English literature (1979-81).
- Harley Jessup, director of special effects, 1987 Best Visual Effects Oscar winner for the film Innerspace, graphic design (1973–1976).
- Chris Johns, former editor-in-chief of National Geographic magazine, technical journalism (1971–1974).
- Sarah Kennedy, American TV comedian/actor, a regular on '70s and '80s TV comedy, including Rowan & Martin's Laugh-In, English (1965-1966).
- Tala Madani, artist, Louis Comfort Tiffany Foundation (2013), Catherine Doctorow Prize for Contemporary Painting (2013), the De Volkskrant Art Award (2012), Pinchuk Art Centre (2012), political science and visual arts (2000–2004).
- Cathy Marshall, journalist, former CNN anchor, speech communications (1978–1982).
- Susan Masten, served as president of National Congress of American Indians (NCAI) (1999-2001), nationally recognized Native American activist, liberal studies (1971-1975).
- Mike McMenamin, national craft brewer, Northwest restaurateur and hotel proprietor, manages 27 breweries, political science (1976–1980).
- Frank Morse, former state senator, former president of one of Oregon's largest construction companies, general studies (MA) (1969-1970)
- George Oppen, winner of the 1969 Pulitzer Prize in poetry, English (1926–?).
- Mary Oppen, poet, English (1926–?).
- Paulina Peavy, American artist (surrealist), established the Paulina Peavy Gallery in Los Angeles, ufologist and occultist, vocational education and art (1919-1923).
- Deborah Reed, author, New York Times Best Selling Book "What the dog knows", English (1994–1997).
- Laurie Roth, nationally syndicated radio talk-show host and political commentator, 2012 presidential candidate, philosophy (Ph.D.) (1991-95)
- Travis Rush, CEO/founder of Reperio Health, founder of Sightbox, former national recording artist/producer, owns Lucky Lab Studios, liberal studies (1990-1992).
- Carl Salser, author, served on the US National Council on Educational Research, journalism (1922–1926).
- Jonathan Smith, former head coach of Oregon State University Football from 2017 to 2023, liberal studies, (1997-2001)
- Ernest H. Taves, psychiatrist and author, a scientific skeptic of UFO sightings, critic of Mormonism, science fiction writer, and former chief of US Army's neuropsychiatric section in Japan, psychology (1933–1937)
- Mary Carlin Yates, federal appointee, foreign service officer at the U.S. State Department and one of two deputy commanders of the United States Africa Command until June 2009, English (1966–1969).

== Notable faculty ==
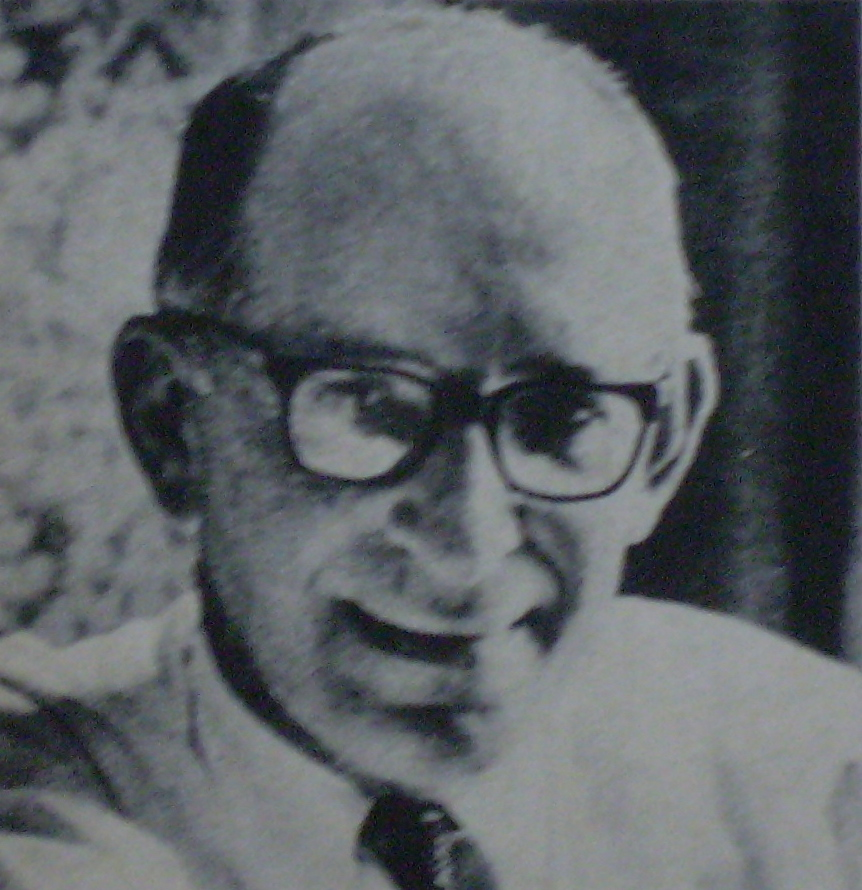
Bernard Malamud

- Marcus Borg, religious scholar and theologian, a widely known and influential voice for Liberal Christianity, religious studies (1979-2007)
- Jon Franklin, journalist, Pulitzer prizes in journalism and science writing with the Baltimore Evening Sun, chair of technical journalism school (1989–1991).
- Gordon Gilkey, first dean of the college of liberal arts, winner of the Meritorious Service Medal for his work during WWII.
- Bernard Malamud, author – 1967 Pulitzer Prize for Fiction, most famous for writing The Natural, English (1949–1961).
- Tom McCall, historic governor of Oregon, journalist, former journalism and public affairs instructor (1975-1976).
- Ed McClanahan, novelist and short story writer – wrote for Esquire, Playboy and Rolling Stone. Received Playboy's award for nonfiction in 1972 and 1974, English (1958–1962).
- Joseph Millar, poet – 2008 Pushcart Prize winner and Guggenheim Fellow, English, (1999-2003).
- Kathleen Dean Moore, philosopher, author and environmental activist – 2000 Sigurd Olson Nature Writing Award, for Holdfast, 1990 Choice Magazine, Outstanding Academic Book for Pardons, philosophy (1992–2013).
- Elena Passarello, American creative nonfiction author, 2015 Whiting Award winner for nonfiction, 2013 Independent Publisher Book Awards gold medal winner for nonfiction, current associate professor of creative writing.
- Dana Reason, Canadian composer and recording artist, current assistant professor of contemporary music, school of arts and communication.
- Willi Unsoeld, member of the first American expedition to summit Mount Everest, religious studies (1958-1962)
- William Appleman Williams, author of modern US history and regarded as a founder of the "revisionist school" of American diplomatic history and a prolific author, history (1968–1986).

== Deans ==
- Gordon Gilkey (1973-1977)
- David J. King (1978-1982)
- Bill Wilkins (1982-1994)
- Kay Schaffer (1994-2007)
- Larry Rogers (2008-2024)
- Philip Williams (2024-Present)
