= John R. Howard =

American academic administrator (1922–2013)

John R. Howard, 1960

John "Jack" Raymond Howard (November 6, 1922 —June 16, 2013) was a business manager in higher education, the Acting President of Lake Forest College from April 1959-June 1960, and the President of Lewis and Clark College from August 1960-1981.

== Biography ==
John R. Howard was born to Rebel and Pauline Wies Howard on November 6, 1922 in McGuffey, Ohio.

In 1942, Howard enlisted in the US Navy and served in the Bureau of Ships in Washington D.C. He was selected for Naval Reserves Officer Training Corps at the University of Pennsylvania in Philadelphia, where he pursued undergraduate studies. Howard received his bachelor's degree majoring in political science and subsequently his master's degree in 1948, making use of the GI Bill.

He married fellow student Ruth Hanners in 1945. The couple had three children: John, Linda, and Rebecca.

He briefly taught political science at the Wharton School of the University of Pennsylvania before becoming the University's business manager until 1957. During this period he led a "Facelift" program which renovated 139 university buildings. During this time his family lived in Valley Forge, Pennsylvania.

In November 1957, Howard was hired at Lake Forest College in Lake Forest College as business manager, working with then-president Ernest A. Johnson to significantly increase faculty salaries, bringing the College to the top 20 colleges in the nation in this regard. In June 1958, he was appointed by the College's Board of Trustees to a new office, Vice President for Business and Finance at Lake Forest College. He also served as secretary for the Board of Trustees. During this time Howard served as chairman of the Illinois Commission on Higher Education's advisory committee on student loans, as a member of its advisory committee on financing self-liquidating facilities, and as secretary of the committee on means of financing higher education. He oversaw a 1958 donation to the Biology Department from the Gulf Oil corporation that enabled the purchase of new microscopes. He coordinated with the Associated Colleges of Illinois for the College to be one of six participating in a Lilly Endowment-funded survey assessing ways college could integrate their business operations for common benefit.

From April 1959-June 1960, he served as Acting President of the College after the passing of Ernest A. Johnson and before the start of William Graham Cole's presidency. He successfully fund-raised from foundations and private individuals (including Abbott Laboratories, the Illinois Bell Telephone Company, and the McCormick family) to fund the Ernest A. Johnson Memorial Science Center, completed in 1962. In October 1959, he represented the College at the annual meeting of the American Council on Education in Washington, D.C. In 1960 he was appointed to an additional Illinois Commission on Higher Education advisory committee, on capital planning.

In May 1960, it was announced that Howard had been appointed president of Lewis and Clark College in Portland, Oregon at just 37 years old. He served in this role until 1981. In 1962, he launched the College's off-campus and international study program. During his presidency, the College of Arts and Sciences doubled in size, both in faculty and student numbers. In 1965 he led the merger of the College with the University of Oregon-offshoot Northwestern College of Law (now the Northwestern School of Law of Lewis and Clark College). He also oversaw the creation of co-ed dormitories. In 2005, the College named John R. Howard Hall in his honor.

Howard passed away on June 16, 2013 in Lake Oswego, Oregon.
