= Deadly Descent =

Deadly Descent may refer to:

== Film ==
- Deadly Descent: The Abominable Snowman, 2013 television film

== Video games ==
- SSX: Deadly Descents, working title for the SSX 2012 video game.
- MacGyver: Deadly Descent, video game based on the 1985 television series MacGyver

== Television ==
- "The Rhyme-Line Caper, Episode 5: Deadly Descent", an episode of the television series Q. T. Hush, aired in 1960
- "Chapter Five: Deadly Descent", an segment of the drama television series Cliffhangers, Stop Susan Williams story arc, aired in 1979
- "Deadly Descent", an episode of the reality television series Dr. G: Medical Examiner, aired in 2010
- "Deadly Descent", an episode of the documentary television series Alaska Wing Men, aired in 2012
- "Deadly Descent", an episode of the reality competition television series Ultimate Survival Alaska, aired in 2015
- "Deadly Descent", an episode of the documentary television series Mayday, covering Cathay Pacific Flight 780, aired in 2019

== See also ==
- Fortune's Deadly Descent, 2012 novel by Audrey Braun
