= Lewis & Clark College =

Private college in Portland, Oregon, US

- Former names: Albany Academy (1858–1866); Albany Collegiate Institute (1866–1867); Albany College (1867–1942)
- Motto: Explorare, Discere, Sociare (Latin)
- Motto in English: To explore, to learn, to work together
- Type: Private liberal arts college
- Established: 1867; 159 years ago
- Endowment: $328.25 million (2025)
- President: Robin Holmes-Sullivan
- Vice-president: David Reese
- Faculty: 414 (fall 2024)
- Administrative staff: 165 (fall 2024)
- Students: 3,462 (fall 2024)
- Undergraduates: 2,139 (fall 2024)
- Postgraduates: 1,323 (fall 2024)
- Location: Portland, Oregon, United States; 45.451°N 122.670°W
- Campus: 137 acres (55 ha); Residential, 137 acres (0.55 km^{2})
- Colors: Orange and black
- Nickname: River Otters
- Mascot: River Otter
- Website: lclark.edu
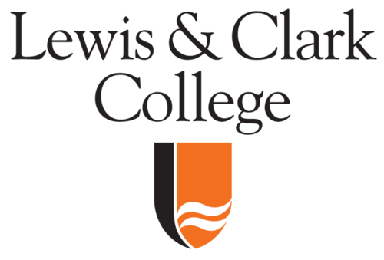

Lewis & Clark College is a private liberal arts college in Portland, Oregon, United States. It was founded in 1867 and is situated on the historic M. Lloyd Frank Estate in South Portland's Collins View neighborhood. It is composed of three distinct but adjacent campuses: the College of Arts & Sciences, the Graduate School of Education & Counseling, and the Law School. Lewis & Clark is a member of the Annapolis Group of colleges with athletic programs competing in the National Collegiate Athletic Association's Division III Northwest Conference.

== History ==
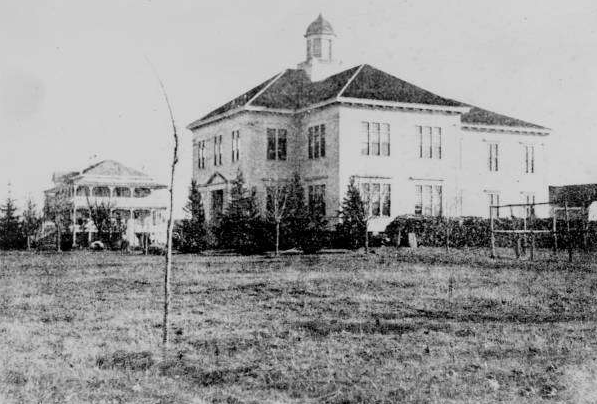
Administration Building c. 1908

Like many modern American universities, the institution that would eventually become Lewis & Clark was initially intended to provide secondary as well as higher education for a specific religious community, in this case Presbyterian pioneers in Oregon's Willamette Valley. The Presbyterian church incorporated "Albany Academy" in 1858.

Within a decade of its founding, Albany Academy began to focus more exclusively on higher education, changing its official name to the "Albany Collegiate Institution" in 1866. Lewis & Clark's official founding date comes from the current charter, which has been legally valid since the Presbyterian church reincorporated the Albany Collegiate Institution as "Albany College" in 1867. Unlike most Oregon colleges of the pioneer era, the college has been co-educational since the first class, which graduated in 1873. The early campus of seven acres (2.8 ha) in Albany was situated on land donated by the Monteith family. In 1892, the original school building was enlarged, and in 1925 the school relocated south of Albany, where it remained until 1937.

Albany College established a junior college to the north in Portland in 1934, with the entire school moving to Portland in 1939. The former campus grounds later became home to the federal government's Albany Research Center. In 1942, the college trustees acquired the Lloyd Frank (of the historic Portland department store Meier & Frank) "Fir Acres" estate in South Portland and the school name was changed to Lewis & Clark College.

In February 2026, the college revealed the final design for and officially changed their mascot to the River Otter. The change came as a result of indifferent feedback about the previous mascot, "Pio" the Newfoundland, which prompted the search for a new mascot in late 2024. A survey of eight potential mascots were sent to students, alumni & trustees, and employees, of which 6.4k voted. The River Otter was chosen, being the top choice for all three voting groups. The final design for the mascot was designed in collaboration with the locally based advertising firm Wieden + Kennedy.

== Rankings ==
Academic rankings

Liberal arts
- U.S. News & World Report: 72
- Washington Monthly: 64

National
- Forbes: 263
- WSJ/College Pulse: 234

The 2020 annual ranking of U.S. News & World Report categorized admission to Lewis & Clark as "more selective" and ranked the college tied for the 72nd best liberal arts college in the U.S.; U.S. News & World Report also ranked it tied for 51st in undergraduate teaching and 89th for "Best Value" among liberal arts colleges. Forbes in 2019 rated it 184th in its America's Top Colleges ranking, which includes 650 military academies, national universities, and liberal arts colleges and 69th among liberal arts colleges. Kiplinger's Personal Finance places Lewis & Clark at 66th in its 2019 ranking of 149 best value liberal arts colleges in the United States. Money magazine ranked Lewis & Clark 585th out of 744 in its "Best Colleges For Your Money 2019" report. In 2024, Washington Monthly ranked Lewis & Clark 64th among 194 liberal arts colleges in the U.S. based on its contribution to the public good, as measured by social mobility, research, and promoting public service.

== Campus ==
Lewis & Clark's 137-acre (0.55 km^{2}) forested campus sits atop Palatine Hill in the Collins View neighborhood of Portland and is contiguous with the 645-acre (2.61 km^{2}) Tryon Creek State Natural Area. Campus buildings include an award-winning environmentally sustainable academic building (John R. Howard Hall), as well as notable historic architecture such as the Frank Manor House (designed by Herman Brookman) and Rogers Hall (formerly Our Lady of Angels convent of the Sisters of St. Francis).

Lewis & Clark was named one of America's top ten "Most Beautiful Campuses" by the Princeton Review, Travel+Leisure as well as an independent architecture blog.

In August 2022, a student died and two were seriously injured while they were sitting on hammocks attached to stone columns on campus and one of the columns collapsed on them. A lawsuit was filed against the school in 2024 alleging that the school had failed to warn students about the danger, to remove the hazard, and to close off the area. The estate of the deceased student sought $20 million from the school, and the case was settled out of court.

=== Residence halls ===
All students are required to live on campus for the first two years, excepting those already residents of Portland, those over the age of 21 before the start of the fall term, married students, and transfer students with at least 61 credit hours.

Most Lewis & Clark College residence halls are co-ed. While individual rooms generally house one gender, students may opt otherwise under the college's gender-neutral housing policy.

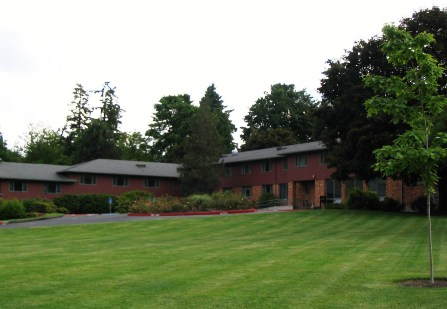
Stewart Residence Hall

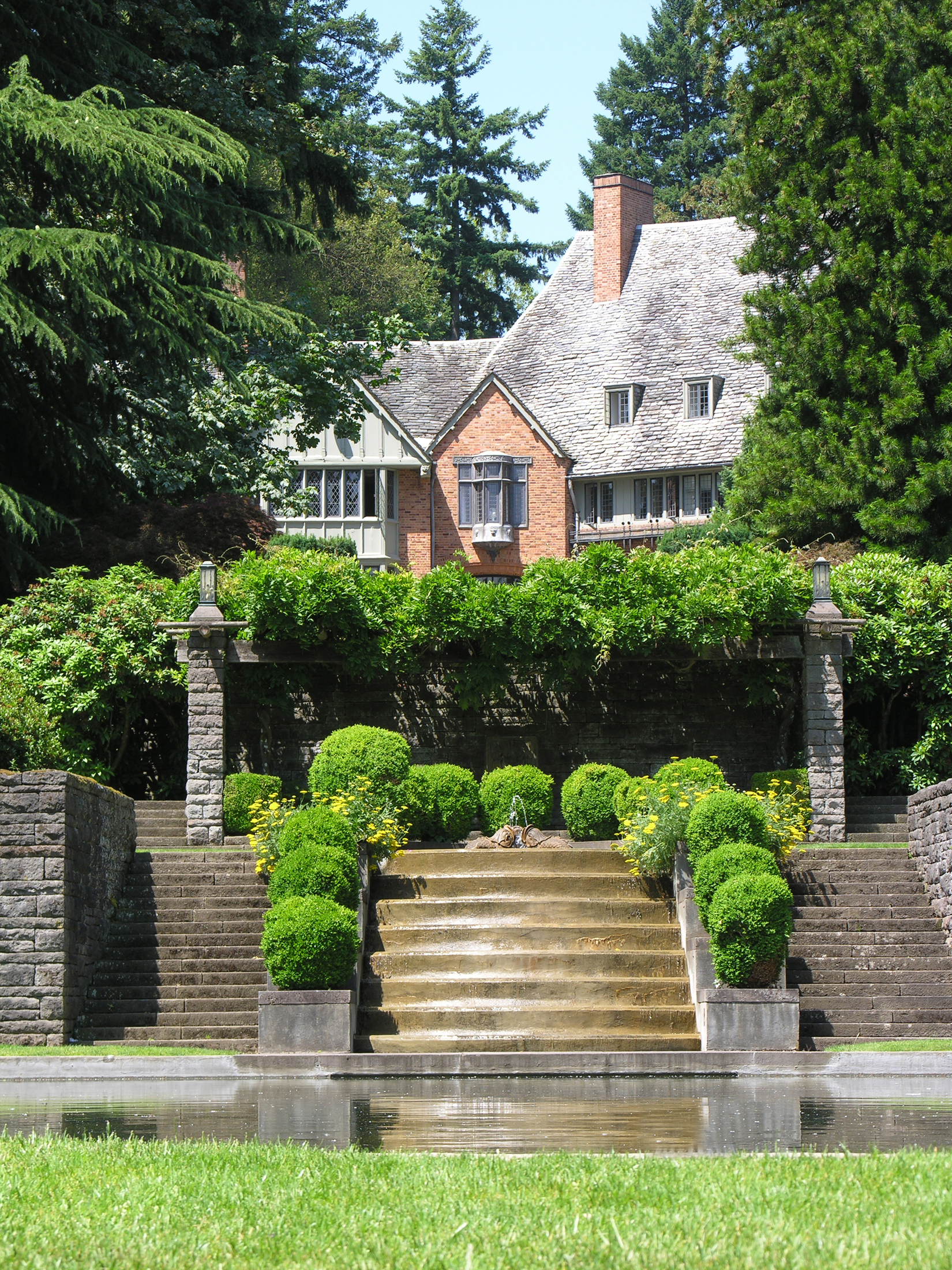
Frank Manor House

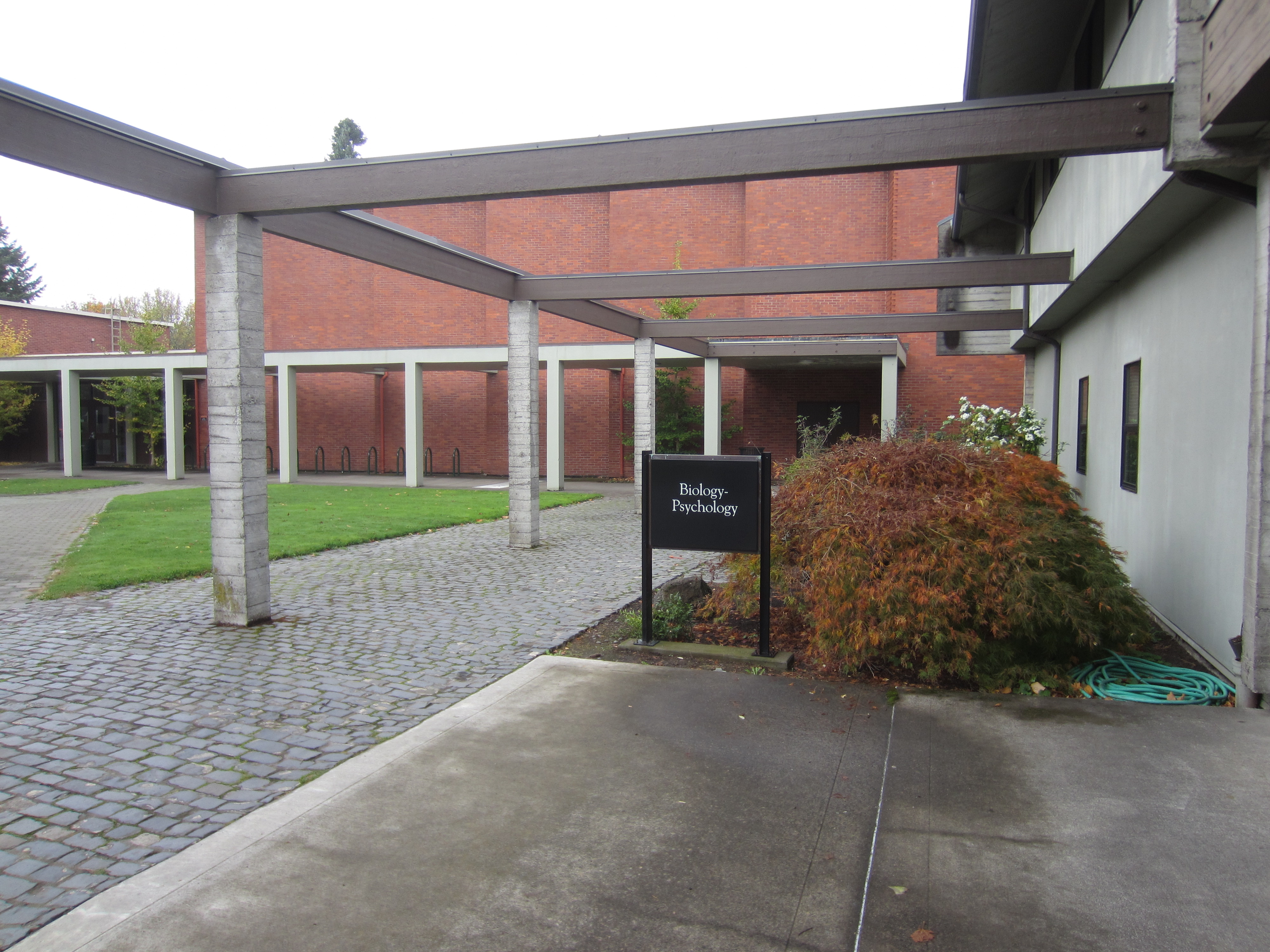
Biology Center

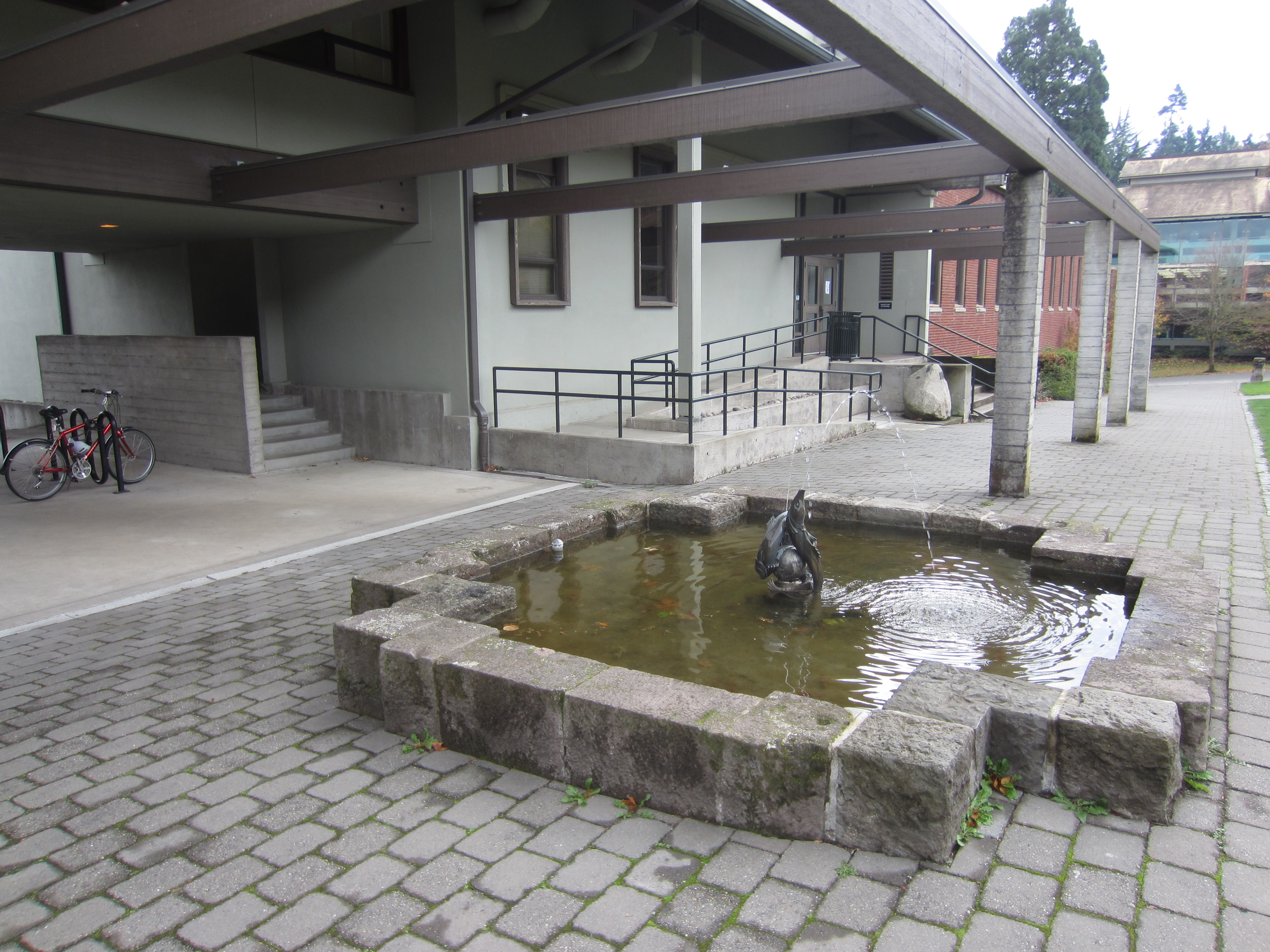
Fountain

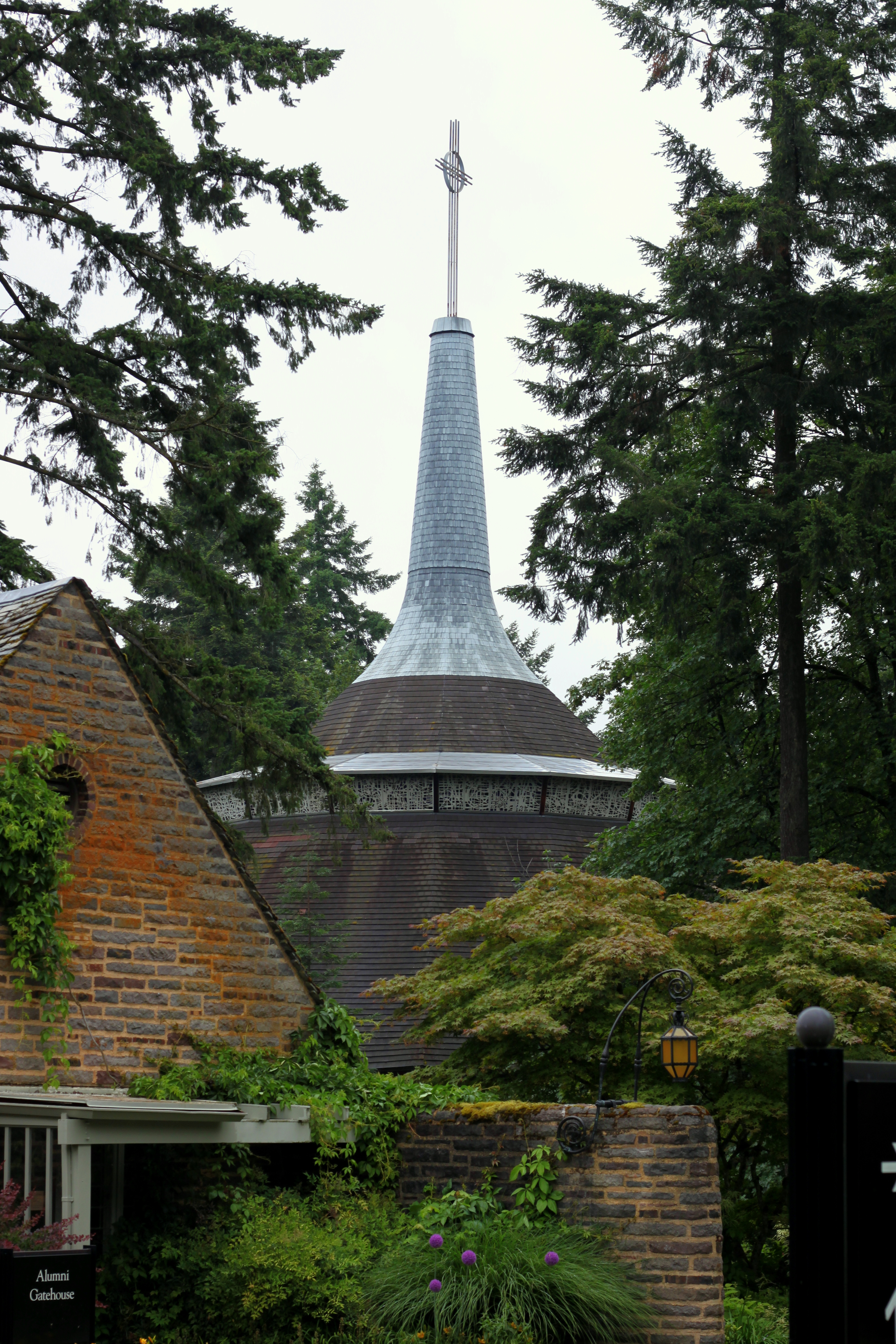
Flanagan Chapel

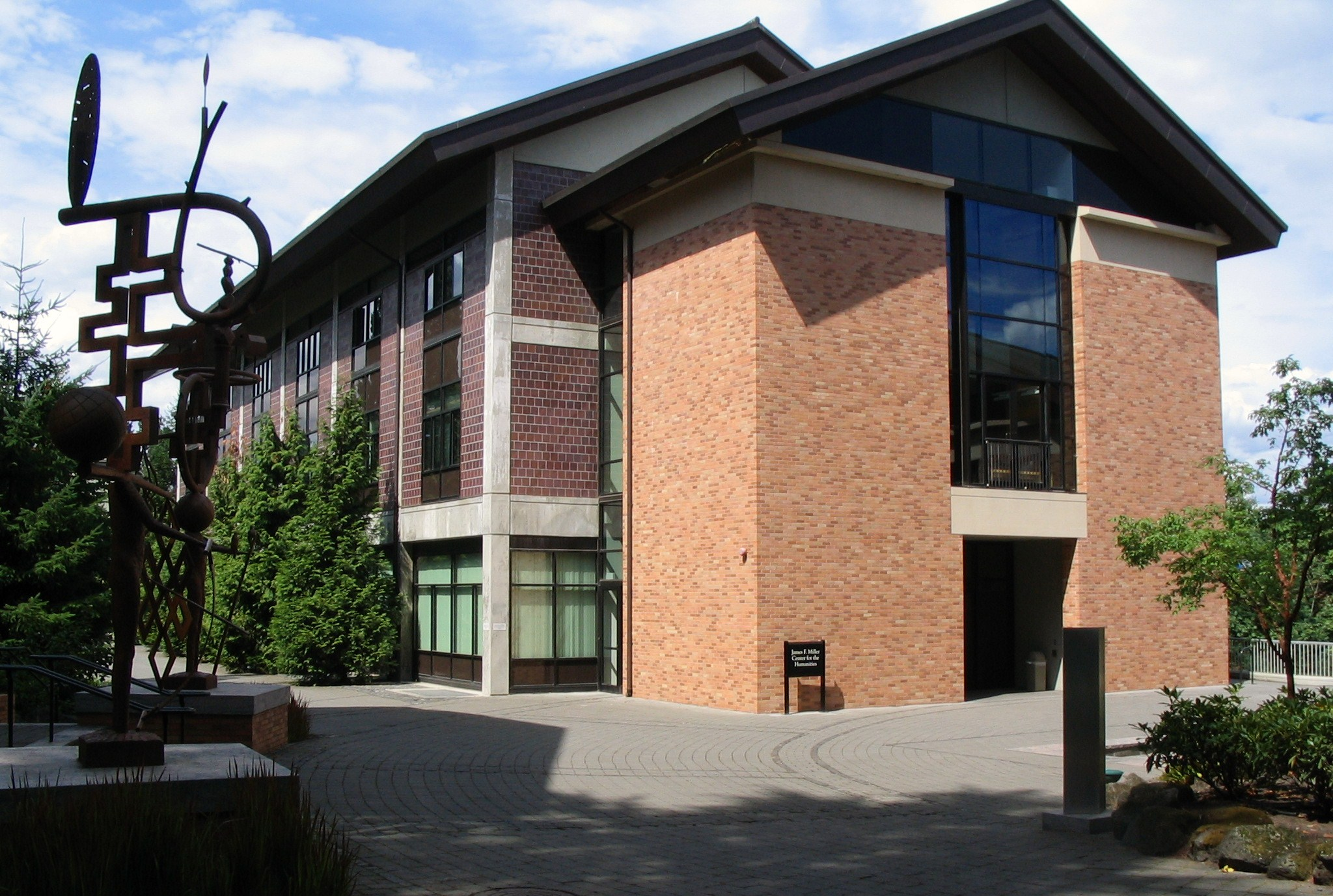
Miller Center for the Humanities

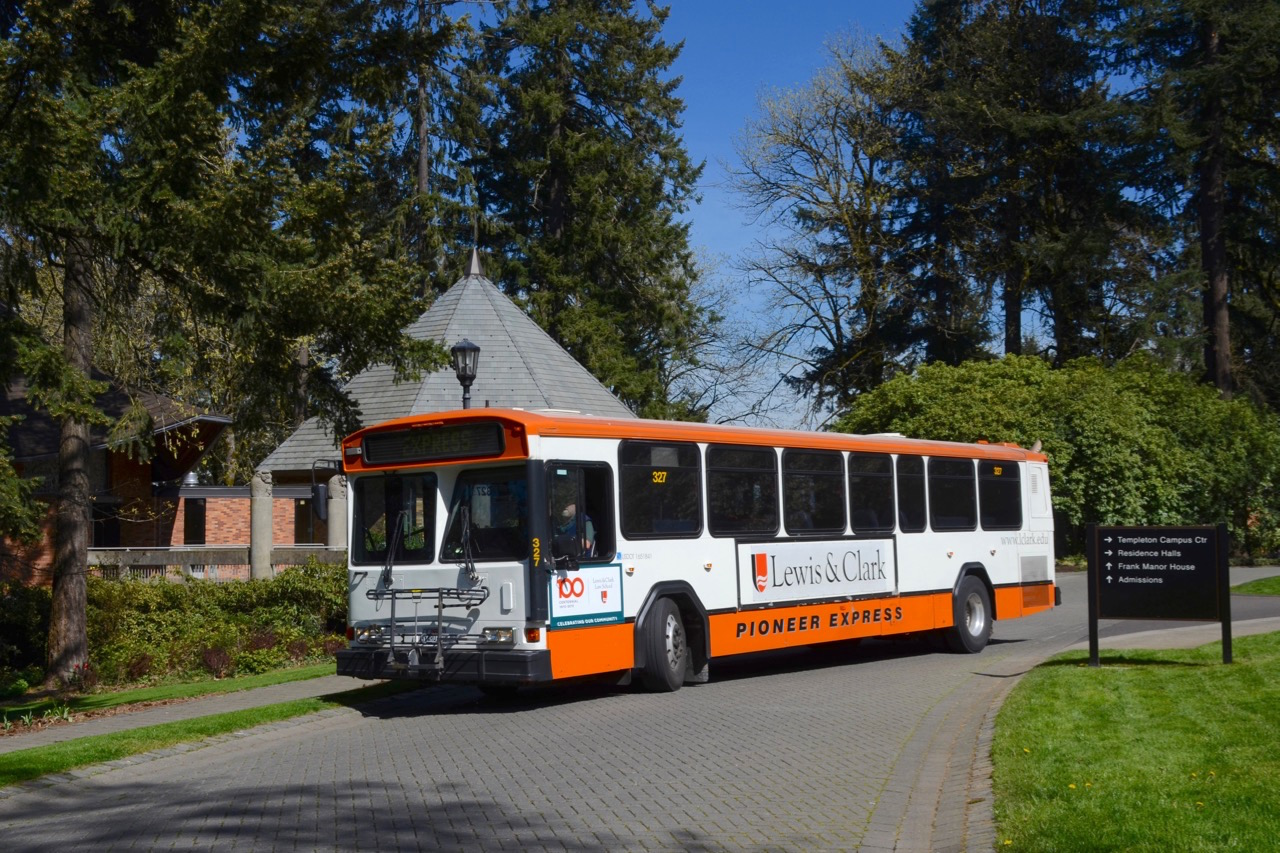
Pioneer Express shuttle bus starting a trip to downtown Portland, in 2016

=== Transportation ===
Throughout the year the college operates a shuttle bus between campus and downtown Portland, the Pioneer Express (also referred to as the "Pio Express" or just, "the Pio").

== Student life ==
Undergraduate demographics as of fall 2023
Race and ethnicity	Total
White	66%
Hispanic	12%
Multiracial Americans	6%
Asian	5%
Foreign national	5%
Black	3%
Unknown	1%
Economic diversity
Low-income (Note: The percentage of students who received an income-based federal Pell grant intended for low-income students.)	20%
Affluent (Note: The percentage of students who are a part of the American middle class at the bare minimum.)	80%

=== Athletics ===
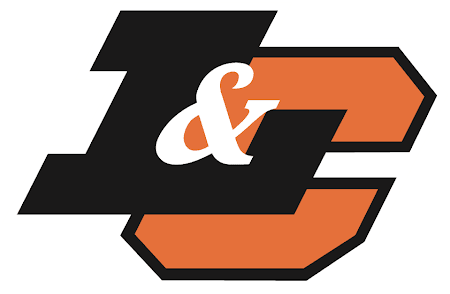
L&C athletics logo

Lewis & Clark maintains 10 male and 11 female varsity sports teams and athletic facilities including Pamplin Sports Center and Griswold Stadium. Lewis & Clark athletic teams are called the River Otters, and team colors are orange and black. The River Otters compete mainly in the Northwest Conference against eight other NCAA Division III institutions in the Pacific Northwest. 17% of undergraduates are officially designated student athletes as of fall 2021. In the 2011 season, the women's cross-country team placed seventh at West regionals, with the men's team placing 13th. The 2011-12 men's basketball team lost in the NWC semifinals putting them in 4th place in the conference. Additionally, the women's team of that same year placed second in the NWC and made an appearance in the NCAA DIII National tournament.

A large number of smaller club and intramural sports such as Rugby and Ultimate Frisbee enjoy broad participation. Lewis & Clark "Bacchus" are winners of the 2025 Men's D-III Ultimate Frisbee College Championships. Lewis & Clark students have invented several intramural competitive sports, including Ninja and Wolvetch, which are popular at Lewis & Clark but seldom played elsewhere.

== Notable faculty, staff, and trustees ==
- Phillip Barron, philosopher and poet
- John F. Callahan, Morgan S. Odell Professor of Humanities and literary executor of Ralph Ellison's estate
- Rev. Elbert Nevius Condit (1846–1900), Presbyterian minister, early president (1879-?) when it was known as Albany Collegiate Institute.
- Fitzhugh Dodson, Presbyterian minister, psychologist, taught religion
- Bob Gaillard - basketball coach
- Barry Glassner - president (2010–2017), sociologist and author
- Robert B. Pamplin, Jr., entrepreneur, philanthropist, trustee
- Vern Rutsala, poet
- Kim Stafford, writer
- William Stafford, poet
- Anthony Swofford, former adjunct professor of humanities, author of Jarhead
- Mary Szybist, poet
- Edwina Florence Wills, artist and musician

== Notable alumni ==
- Penn Badgley (2004), actor
- Matt Biondi (2000), swimmer
- Charles A. Blanchard (1981), attorney and senior Pentagon official
- Earl Blumenauer (1970, J.D. 1976), U.S. representative
- Don Bonker (1964), former U.S. representative
- Kate Brown (1985), 38th governor of Oregon
- Larry Campbell (1953), former speaker of the Oregon House of Representatives
- Ever Carradine (1996), actress
- Amber Case (2008), entrepreneur
- Ted Gaines (1981), member of the California State Senate
- Gordon Gilkey (1933 from Albany College), artist; dean of Oregon State University College of Liberal Arts; curator of prints and drawings at the Portland Art Museum
- Haben Girma (2010), disability rights advocate
- Genevieve Gorder (1996), television personality
- Alan L. Hart (1912 from Albany College), transgender physician, novelist, and tuberculosis researcher
- Heidi Heitkamp (JD 1980), former U.S. senator and North Dakota attorney general
- Jeanne Holm (1956), former brigadier general in the U.S. Air Force
- Ralph M. Holman (1937), attorney and Oregon Supreme Court judge
- Jon Jaqua, former defensive back for the Washington Redskins of the National Football League; member of the Lewis & Clark Sports Hall of Fame
- Marcia S. Krieger (1975), judge on the United States District Court for the District of Colorado
- Monica Lewinsky (1995), anti-bullying activist and party to the Clinton–Lewinsky scandal
- Jake Longstreth (1999), artist and radio personality
- Ronald A. Marks (1978), former CIA official
- Mark V. Olsen (1977), co-creator of HBO series Big Love
- Khanh Pham (2001), Oregon state representative, House District 46
- Markie Post (1975), actress known for Night Court
- Ahmed Ali Al Sayegh (1983), minister of state in the United Arab Emirates
- Quinn Slobodian (2000), professor of history at Wellesley College and writer
- Harrison Patrick Smith (approx. 2018), musician performing as The Dare
- Pete Ward (1962), Major League Baseball player
