= Paul Fontaine =

American painter

Paul Fontaine (1913–1996) was an American painter.

== Life ==
Abstract-colorist painter Paul Emile Fontaine was born in 1913 in Worcester, Massachusetts to Elzear and Mary Fontaine, both of French Canadian descent. Fontaine had two younger brothers, Russell and Leo Fontaine. Paul Fontaine was encouraged to be a painter early on, deciding to pursue this artistic path as a teenager. He enrolled at the Worcester Art Museum School following completion of high school and remained there from 1932 to 1935. Fontaine followed his studies with a six-month term in the Civilian Conservation Corps. In 1936, Fontaine worked as a Works Progress Administration (or Section of Fine Arts, US Treasury) painter in Springfield, Massachusetts, painting murals in the city's Post Office under Umberto Romano.

Following employment as a WPA painter, Fontaine continued his studies at Yale's art school. Francis H. Taylor, director of the Worcester Art Museum, secured a matching grant for Fontaine to engage in further studies at Yale University, the only time the Worcester Art Museum School donated significant funds to a student's career. Fontaine began at Yale in 1938 and graduated among the top of his class in 1940. Fontaine was awarded the Winchester Wirt Traveling Fellowship the same year, but due to wartime exigencies, chose instead to study and paint in the Caribbean.

Paul Fontaine married fellow Yale art student Virginia Hammersmith in 1940. Virginia Fontaine was trained as a painter at Yale but did not graduate, and she became a major force in Paul's subsequent creative activities. Virginia was born in 1915 to Paul and Myrtle Hammersmith of Milwaukee, Wisconsin (founders of the Hammersmith Printing Company). Following their marriage, the Fontaines went to the British Virgin Islands, primarily Tortola, on Paul's fellowship.

In 1941, Paul Fontaine returned to Worcester where he worked in a factory and painted regularly. He submitted several watercolors for government tours and founded the Worcester Artists Group with Herbert Barnett. He also exhibited his work at the Grace Horn Galleries in Boston and built a studio behind his mother's house known as “Rocky Tor.” In 1943, Fontaine was drafted and sent to Italy where he worked as an illustrator and painted commissions for the US Army and Red Cross. His first daughter, Carol, was born that same year in Worcester. In 1945, Fontaine began working as an Army cartographer in Paris before settling in Frankfurt as the graphic director for the Army's regional headquarters. He remained in this position until 1953 and was able to witness the rebuilding of the city's artistic community. During the late 1940s, Fontaine's Italian watercolors toured the United States to acclaim in an exhibition organized by Virginia Fontaine. His second daughter, Eugenie (Paula), was born in Frankfurt in 1948.

In 1953, the Fontaines moved to Darmstadt, where Paul became the art director for Stars and Stripes, the Army's European circular. This was his principal source of income until his retirement in 1969 at age 55. The Fontaines' third daughter, Claudia, was born in Darmstadt in 1956. During this period, Virginia began to focus more on her own work, which included curating and photography. At the request of Gordon Gilkey, the print curator for Oregon State University at Corvallis and former Adjutant General in charge of salvaging looted European art, she curated and procured prints for an exhibition of contemporary German prints in 1963. She was also the translator for the first definitive work on Hans Hartung published by Ottomar Domnick, who was a major collector of contemporary works from that time period.

In 1969, the Fontaines moved to Guadalajara, Mexico, following Paul Fontaine's retirement. In 1992 at age 75, Paul moved to Austin, Texas to be nearer to his daughters. He died in 1996 at age 82.

== War Watercolors ==
Paul Fontaine sought a European sojourn as a way to put into practice what he had gleaned from his studies at the Yale Art School, a traveling fellowship (the Winchester Wirt Fellowship) that would have taken him to Paris and to Italy. However, with war breaking out in the 1930s, Fontaine used his fellowship to take himself and Virginia to the Virgin Islands. They lived mostly in Tortola, but also spent time in Puerto Rico, Guana Island, and Virgin Gorda through 1940 and '41. With the conditions posed, it was a source of inspiration for Fontaine's later abstract works.

After this year abroad, the Fontaines returned to the States where they built a studio in Worcester called Rocky Tor. In 1943, Paul was drafted and sent to Italy as an infantryman.

Following a group show at the Worcester Art Museum in May 1943, his next exhibition and second official one-man show was a touring one, first held at the Margaret Brown Gallery in Boston in March 1945 after his tour of duty, which focused entirely on the war watercolors. The show was also displayed at Ripon College, the Fitchburg Art Center, the Milwaukee Museum of Art, and the Kalamazoo Museum of Art. In October 1945, the Milwaukee Sentinel published a lengthy article on Fontaine's watercolors to accompany the exhibition entitled Impressions of a Worcester Combat Artist, which detailed Fontaine's life and work up to that point and included images of significant war watercolors. Writer Robert Creighton states that "in Sgt. Fontaine we have a combat artist with a decidedly different slant. This young man, an outstanding product of the Worcester Art Museum School as well as of Yale, has expressly stated...that he had no intention of reproducing photographically the history of his progress up the Italian peninsula. Instead he has set down in his unique – and sometimes quite abstract – way the situations in which he found himself." The show consisted of twenty watercolors, which constitute the only visual documentation of this period (he had completed at least one hundred works while in Tortola).

After the war's end, Fontaine began working for the Historical Division as a cartographer in Paris, but a change in position to graphics director found him relocating to Frankfurt, to be joined by Virginia and their young daughter Carol in the winter of 1946.

== Abstraction ==
Fontaine's work of the 1950s and 1960s, a large body of work executed mostly in oil and acrylic, were a break in scale from the war watercolors and works of the 1940s. His meeting of gallerist Lucia Stern in Boston was a turning point, as was an exhibition in Wiesbaden of the paintings of German abstractionists like Willi Baumeister, Otto Ritschl, Erich Heckel, Karlheinz Schmidt-Rotluff and Emile Nolde in 1949. In 1978, the artist explained that "in 1946 I discovered that a picture could be made without literary content. This filled me up with such excitement that up until today it's the only form of painting that still captivates me. The purity of it. Form, color, line, rhythm, without compromise creating the picture. No need to reproduce a scene or tell a tale. What liberation."

Fontaine was, by the mid-1950s, living in Darmstadt, where he also had contact with composers of new music (Karlheinz Stockhausen and Mauricio Kagel would be among these) and practitioners of modern dance and other arts. Crucial in this was his wife, Virginia Fontaine, who was socially well-connected among the area's cultural and artistic circles. She was also instrumental (as was Baumeister) in getting Paul Fontaine to show in galleries and connect with the Darmstädter Sezession (where he was the only American member).

Upon retiring from Stars and Stripes in 1969, the Fontaines moved to Guadalajara, Mexico. Leaving Darmstadt and Europe, writer Robert d'Hooge noted the following in Schlosskeller: "Since he has discovered his problems and his way of translating and expressing those in his paintings, Fontaine has gone without hesitation, his own way. It was always the intrinsic value of color, the improvement in their comparison and contrast, the vision of light and dark that was moving to Fontaine. Now the evolution has arrived at the Stadium of Wisdom, where the sonorous double-sound of two colors creates complete harmony in the smallest space. We do not know how the bright light of Mexico will affect the development of Fontaine's painting. What is a loss for us can be gain for him. We wish this from our hearts."

Fontaine's approach to space also changed during this time; large areas of white ground supplanted by colorful floral explosions (called "schmoos") recall some of Morris Louis' stained "florals" in their color and impact. Motifs like doorways and sailboats are noted by the artist as chance abstract occurrences from a blank mind. As the artist states in 1978, "where the ideas come from is both unknown and confounding as well as impossible to verbalize... the strength of the impact should become easily communicative not just to me, but hopefully to everyone."

After the death of his wife Virginia, Paul Fontaine moved to Austin, Texas in 1992 in order to be close to his daughters. Though his health was failing, he continued to paint, using house paints as his medium of choice.

== Critical reception ==
Though most abstract painters are far from household names, Fontaine has been unknown, especially in the country of his birth. Expatriating to Europe could have improved his showing chances, and it did to a degree – exhibiting at Amsterdam's Stedelijk and the Neue Sezession in Darmstadt certainly counts toward a presence on the continental art scene. But even as he befriended and/or showed with artists like Baumeister, Ernst Wilhelm Nay, Hans Hartung, and Bauhaus weaver and painter Ida Kerkovius, Fontaine did not quite ascend in notoriety while in Europe.

His one-man show of war watercolors, organized with assistance from the Margaret Brown Gallery in Boston, toured museums in the US, travelling to the Milwaukee Art Institute, Indiana University, Ripon College, Kalamazoo Institute of Art, Fitchburg Art Center, and closing at the Brown Gallery. Living in Paris after the war, he showed at the Salon des Réalités Nouvelles in Paris' Museum of Modern Art (1950/51). While in Germany, he showed often at the Frankfurter Kunstkabinett (including a two-man show with Alexander Calder), among other locations, averaging about two shows a year. In Mexico, he showed at the Galeria Moderna and Centro de Arte Moderno in Guadalajara, as well as holding one-man shows at the Erie Art Museum (Erie, PA) and at Chicago's Worthington Gallery.

Virginia Fontaine's friendships with gallerist Hanna Bekker vom Rath and Oregon State University curator Gordon Gilkey did not bleed into broad visibility for Fontaine. A 1963 review of paintings in Heidelberg, German and American Painting, did not significantly capture the tonal and spatial considerations that Fontaine was after: "Paul Fontaine, on the other hand, shows himself as a painter who loves the gentle and pleasant, without conscious consideration if, in his painting, he forces himself to artistic positions. The beautiful is dominant, and the contours break fluidly apart." Critic Egon Vietta was to write a monograph on Fontaine's work, but that plan was cut short by his untimely death. Fontaine's art has a list of his exhibitions. However, the depth of his approach did not receive the attention that it could have, either in his home country or his adopted homes in Germany and Mexico.

== Exhibitions ==
1936 Corcoran Gallery, Washington D.C. USA

1940 Museum of Modern Art, New York USA

1941 October San Juan, Puerto Rico

1941 November Pennsylvania Academy of Fine Arts 39th Annual Philadelphia Water color and print exhibition

1941 December Jordan Marsh Gallery, Worcester, MA. USA

1942 April Worcester Art Museum, Worcester, MA USA

1942 May Museum of Rhode Island School of Design. Providence, RI. USA

1942 November Grace Horne Gallery, Boston MA. USA

1942 May Worcester Art Museum, Worcester, MA. USA

1945 March Margaret Brown Gallery, Boston MA. USA

1945 April Fitchberg Museum, Fitchberg, MA. USA

1945 June Indiana State University Museum, USA

1945 October Milwaukee Art institute, WI, USA

1948 May Frankfurter Kunstkabinett, Frankfurt, West Germany

1948 June Wuppertal Barmen Museum, Westfalia, Germany

1949 February Frankfurter Kunstkabinett, Germany

1949 July Salon des Realites Nouvelles, Museum of Modern Art, Paris France

1950 January Margaret Brown Gallery, Boston MA. USA

1950 March Studio Fur Neue Kunst Doppersberg, Wuppertal, Germany

1950 June Frankfurter Kunstkabinett, Germany

1950 November Hamburger Volkerkunde Museum, Germany

1950 to September 1951 One Man traveling exhibition to German Museums and US Cultural Centers

1950 July Landesmuseum, Wiesbaden

1950 August Marburg Museum

1950 September Fulda Museum

1950 October Giesen Museum

1950 November Landesmuseum Kassel

1951 January Frankfurt Museum

1951 March Darmstadt Museum

1951 April Die Brucke Galerie Elberfeld, Wupbertal

1951 June Hamburg Museum

1951 August Berlin Museum

1951 June Salon des Realites NouveIles, Museum of Modern Art, Paris France

1951 July Brooklyn Museum, New York, USA.

1951 July Palace Hotel, St. Moritz, Switzerland

1951 September Galerie Chichio Haller, Zurich Switzerland

1952 March Zimmer Galerie Franck, Frankfurt/M, Germany

1952 October Pittsburg Carnegie International USA

1953 February Frankfurter Kunstkabinett (Paul Fontaine and Alexander Calder)

1953 Stedelijk Museum Amsterdam, the Netherlands. (works in Dr. Otto. Domnick collection)

1954 March Dortmund Museum am 0stwald, Westfalia, Germany

1954 June Markischen Museum, Witten, Westfalia, Germany

1954 July Amerika HAUS Hannover, Germany

1954 September Darmstadt Stadtbucherei Austellung, Germany

1954 October Buchhandlung Wertmuller Galeria, Basel Switzerland

1955 January Stedelijk Museum, Amsterdam, the Netherlands.

1955 August to May 1956 Frankfurter Kunstkabinett World Tour Havana, Cuba, Palacio de Bellas Artes São Paulo, Brazil, Museum de Artes Santiago, Chile, German Chilean Culture Institute Cape Town, South Africa, Gallery Kreitner Bombay, India J.J. School of Art Bangalore, India. Indian Institute of Culture New Deli, India, Jaipur House Rio de Janeiro, Brazil, Museau de Arte Moderna Belo Horizonte, Brazil, Edificio Dante

1956 February East & West Gallery, San Francisco CA. USA

1956 April Patio Galerie, Saxanhausen/Frankfurt, Germany

1958 September Stadtmuseum Schloss Morsbroich Leverkusen, Germany

1958 December Frankfurter Kunstkabinett, Germany

1959 September Neue Darmstadter Sezession, Germany

1960 February Frankfurter Kunstkabinett, Germany

1960 April Frankfurter Kunstkabinett, Germany

1960 April Hamburg, Germany

1961 September Neue Darmstadter Sezession, Germany

1961 November ORGANON 61 Earban Bayer Museum, Leverkusen, Germany

1963 November Heidelberg Amerika Haus, Germany

1964 April Hoechst Frankfurt, Germany

1964 October Neue Darmstadter Sezession, Germany

1964 December Keller Galerie im Schloss Darmstadt, Germany

1965 July Neckerman Exhibition, Frankfurt, Germany

1965 September Neue Darmstadter Sezession, Germany

1966 April Tower Gallery am Rhein, Germany

1966 June Patio Galerie, Sachsenhausen /Frankfurt, Germany

1966 August Aschaffenburg Museum, Germany

1967 April Neue Darmstadter Sezession, Germany 1968 December Keller Galerie Im Schloss Darmstadt, Germany

1969 September Neue Darmstadter Sezession, Germany

1970 February Keller Galerie im Schloss Darmstadt, Germany

1971 November Instituto Cultural Mexicano Norteamericano de Jalisco, Mexico

1972 January University of Colima, Jalisco, Mexico

1972 November Instituto Cultural Mexicano Norteamericano de Jalisco, Mexico

1973 July Erie Art Museum, Erie, PA. USA

1974 June Ajijic, Jalisco, Mexico

1974 July Frohman Gallery, Suffolk, VA. USA

1975 June Jean Adam Gallery, Menlo Park CA. USA

1978 February Galeria Municipal, Guadalajara, Jalisco, Mexico

1978 April Galeria del Lago, Ajijic, Jalisco, Mexico.

1978 July Frohman Gallery, Suffolk, VA. USA

1979 February Ex Convento del Carmen, Guadalajara, Jalisco, Mexico

1979 Collection Permanente Galeria Municipal, Guadalajara, Jalisco, Mexico

1979 April Richter Art Gallery, Danbury, CT. USA

1979 May Adobe Art Gallery, Puerto Vallarta, Jalisco, Mexico

1980 March Centro de Arte Moderno, Guadalajara. Jalisco, Mexico

1980 May Centro de Arte Moderno, Guadalajara, Jalisco, Mexico

1980 June Galeria de Arte Contemporaneo, Mazatlan, Sinaloa, Mexico

1980 September Instituto Cultural Mexicano Norteamericano, Mexico, D.F.

1980 October Centro de Arte Moderno, Guadalajara, Jalisco, Mexico

1980 November Centro de Arte Moderno, Guadalajara, Jalisco, Mexico

1980 December Centro de Arte Moderno, Guadalajara, Jalisco, Mexico

1981 September Galeria Marchand, Guadalajara, Jalisco, Mexico

1984 Galeria Municipal TorresBodet, Guadalajara, Jalisco, Mexico

1985 October Instituto Cultural Mexicano Norteamericano, Mexico, D.F.

1985 October Galeria Municipal Guadalajara, Jalisco, Mexico

1985 October Centro de Arte Moderno, Gaadalajara, Jalisco, Mexico

1986 June Galeria Alejandro Gallo, Guadalajara, Jalisco, Mexico

1986 December Worthington Gallery Chicago IL, USA

1987 December Worthington Gallery Chicago IL, USA

1989 January Worthington Gallery Chicago III, USA

1990 February Centro Arte Moderno Guadalajara, Jalisco, Mexico

1991 June Worthington Gallery Chicago IL USA.

1992 August Galeria Alejandro Gallo Guadalajara, Jalisco, Mexico

1995 Sol de Rio Gallery, San Antonio, Texas, USA
