= John R. Howard Hall =

Building on the Lewis & Clark College campus in Portland, Oregon, U.S.

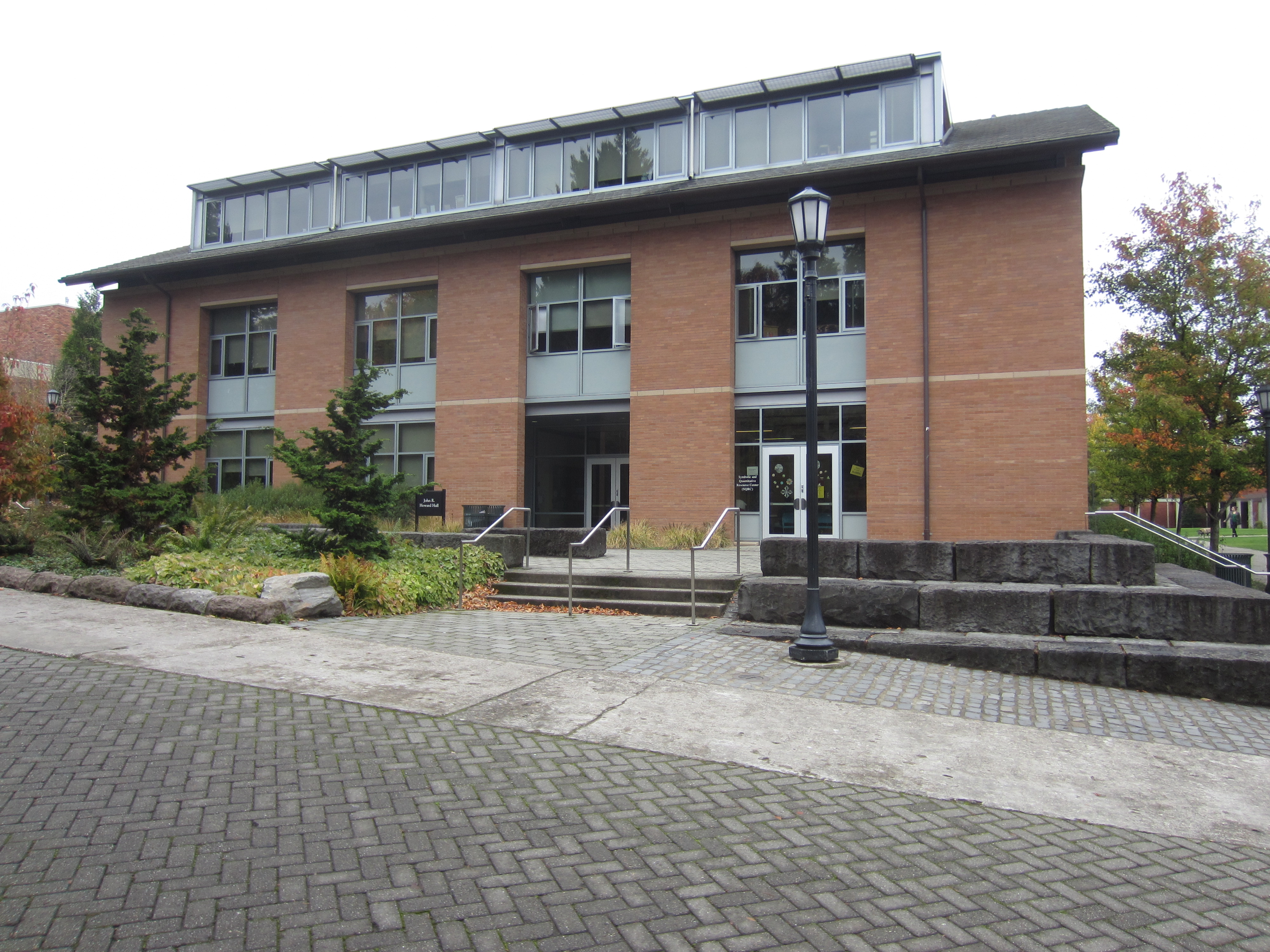
- The building's exterior in 2017
- Interactive map of the John R. Howard Hall area

General information
- Location: Portland, Oregon, United States
- Coordinates: 45°26′56.2″N 122°40′09.5″W

John R. Howard Hall is an academic building on the Lewis & Clark College campus, in Portland, Oregon. The building opened in 2004, and was dedicated in 2005.
