= The Daily Barometer =

Newspaper in Corvallis, Oregon

- The Barometer went daily in 1922-23
- Type: Student newspaper
- Format: Tabloid
- Owner: Orange Media Network
- Founded: 1896
- Headquarters: 428 Student Experience Center, 2251 SW Jefferson Way, Oregon State University, Corvallis, OR 97331; United States
- Circulation: 7,000 daily (as of 2014)
- Website: dailybaro.orangemedianetwork.com

The Daily Barometer is an independent campus newspaper of Oregon State University (OSU), in Corvallis, first established in 1896. Beginning as a monthly magazine, it was for many decades a daily newspaper subsidized by and targeted to OSU's student body. Today it maintains a daily internet presence, with physical copies published monthly during the school year.

Also known as The Baro, the news team covers local news and events and brings awareness to important student issues. Students serve as editors, reporters, and photographers to cover news through the newspaper, website, social media, and online videos.

== History ==
=== Origins ===
On March 16, 1896, the first issue of a monthly magazine called The College Barometer rolled off the presses at Oregon Agricultural College, today's Oregon State University. The first editor was F.E. Edwards. The publication continued as a monthly for some eleven years before expanding to a weekly publication cycle in 1907.

The Baro dates back to a monthly magazine, The College Barometer, launched in March 1896 by the literary societies of Oregon Agricultural College.

The paper also underwent physical expansion during the 1907–08 academic year, moving from a four-column 12-inch page to a five-column 16-inch page, making it the largest college weekly on the Pacific coast. In view of the publication's growing size and time-consuming production schedule, the editor and business manager were allotted a salary beginning in 1909.

The frequency was increased to semi-monthly for the 1910–11 academic year — initially published on Wednesdays and Saturdays, but moving to other days of the week from term to term. A typical issue of this era had four pages.

While the initial magazine was sold on an annual subscription basis and the newspaper similarly sold by the copy for a short time after that, the expansion of the collection of incidental fees allowed the paper to become a free publication, financed through an allocation of 10 percent of the student fund — a quota specified in the OAC Student Body Constitution.

In December 1921, a proposal was made to a student assembly to expand the OAC Barometer to a daily paper, publishing five times per week. To defray expenses of the expansion, an additional fee of 50 cents per quarter per student was to be levied. After being approved, the proposal was sent to the OAC Board of Regents, which authorized the change effective with the 1922–23 academic year. The paper was published thereafter Tuesday through Saturday from the end of September until early June, corresponding with the academic year.

Beginning in the fall of 1924, physical production was handled each night at the plant of the local Corvallis Gazette-Times. In an office reserved for the purpose at the Gazette-Times building, a dummy was constructed and stories written and edited throughout the day were sent to linotype operators for typesetting. Long stories were set first and laid out by a "make-up man" in accordance with the dummy copy. The final page was then given a careful reading for final inspection by the Barometer night editor and assistant before being "put to bed" for printing. Distribution took place in the morning hours. The paper used five daily editors and five night editors, each with an assistant editor and responsible for the production of one day's paper each week.

The circulation of the Daily Barometer grew with the sized of the student body, hitting the 3,600 mark in 1927.

=== Contemporary history ===
Determining that their free paper was the only source of information for many students, in 1982 the Barometer expanded their coverage of international and regional news to supplement their traditional campus orientation. The paper also placed a large emphasis on its opinion pages, including frequent guest editorials and "Op-Ed" pieces. The paper maintained a circulation of 10,500 copies per issue during this era, distributed free of charge each morning at kiosks spread across the Oregon State campus. A staff of 60 worked on the paper, handling all aspects from writing and photography to production to advertising sales.

In 2016, The Daily Barometer began printing weekly as The Baro, with daily news content delivered via videos and online content.

== Awards and honors ==
Over the course of its century of existence as a campus newspaper, the Barometer has been the recipient of a number of prestigious national awards. In 2001, the Society of Professional Journalists (SPJ) named the paper the national winner as Best All-Around Daily Student Newspaper. It was also tapped as the regional winner as Best All-Around Daily Student Newspaper in 2011 and 2014 The paper also won the Apple Award for Best Newspaper with a circulation of more than 10,000 from the College Media Association in 2017.

Individual members of the Barometer staff have similarly been national finalists or recipients of SPJ awards for excellence for sports photography in 2006 and 2010; for Feature Story of the Year in 2013, and for Editorial Commentary of the Year in 2014.

The Oregon Newspaper Publishers Association has similarly bestowed numerous honors upon members of the Barometer staff.

== Notable alumni ==
- Pinto Colvig (Vance DeBar Colvig Sr.) voice acting pioneer at Disney Studios, journalism and art, (1910-1913)
- David Gilkey (1966–2016) - photojournalist killed in American–Afghan war
