= William Graham Cole =

American professor of religion

William Graham Cole, 1962

William Graham Cole (March 7, 1917 – January 25, 2011) was a professor of religion at Williams College and president of Lake Forest College from 1960 to 1969.

== Biography ==
William Graham Cole was born on March 7, 1917, in Jamaica, New York to parents Helen (née Graham) and John Cole. In 1941 Cole married Barnard College graduate Doris Elinor Williams and they had three sons: William Graham Jr., Edward M., and Stephen S. The couple subsequently divorced and remarried, Cole to Sally Lou Kint in 1970.

Cole attended the Mount Hermon School in Gill, Massachusetts and in 1940 graduated from Columbia University in New York City. He went on to receive his Bachelor of Divinity in 1943 and his PhD in 1954 from Union Theological Seminary in New York City.

He began his career as Chaplain and Lecturer in Biblical Literature at Western Reserve University in Cleveland, Ohio, Visiting Chaplain at Stanford University in California, and counselor to Protestant students at Columbia University. He was Chaplain and Professor of Religion and Biblical Literature at Smith College from 1948 to 1952. In 1952, he was hired as Chaplain and Cluett Professor and Chair of Religion at Williams College, where he also served as Dean of Freshmen. In September 1960, he was appointed the ninth President of Lake Forest College. In 1961 he was made an honorary member of Phi Beta Kappa at Lake Forest College. The same year he was awarded an honorary Doctor of Laws degree from Grinnell College. Also in 1961, Lake Forest College constructed an on-campus presidential residence for Cole and his family named Rosemary House (renamed Van Ness House in 2025). In 1962, he oversaw the construction of a new student union at the College (now known as Stuart Commons), and in 1965, the opening of the Donnelley Library. In 1964, he led implementation of a grant the College received from the Ford Foundation to run an experimental four-year independent study program. During his presidency at Lake Forest College he frequently publicly spoke on topics of religion; in 1961 he moderated a television series, "Frontiers of Faith," in 1962 he was a keynote speaker for a young adult institute on "Sex, Love, and Marriage" sponsored by a Jewish community center, in 1966 he spoke at the National Conference of Christians and Jews. From 1962 to 1967, Cole headed the Illinois Commission on Human Relations. In 1963 he was elected to the Chicago Council on Foreign Relations Board of Directors. In 1967 Cole was appointed to the Council of Protestant Colleges and Universities. In 1968, he launched the College's student exchange arrangement with Catholic women's college Barat College, also in Lake Forest.

After resigning from the presidency of Lake Forest College in August 1969, he served as executive director of the Chicago Council of Foreign Relations from 1969 to 1971. In 1971 he was named vice president of academic affairs at Chicago State University, and from 1975 to circa 1977 he was president of Nasson College in Springvale, Maine. By 1980 he was Director of Development at the newly opened Thomas Jefferson Academy in Lake View, Chicago. In 1988 he was a volunteer consultant for the Salvation Army and from 1988 to 1994 he was acting in Chicago theater productions. In 1996 he was awarded an honorary Doctor of Humane Letters by Lake Forest College. He was a Fellow of the National Council on Religion in Higher Education and a member of the National Academy of Religion and Mental Health.

== Books ==
- Sex in Christianity and Psychoanalysis. Oxford University Press, 1955.
- Sex and Love in the Bible. Association Press, 1959.
- The Restless Quest of Modern Man. Oxford University Press, 1966.
- Sex and Selfhood. Geneva Press, 1968.
