= David Gilkey =

American journalist

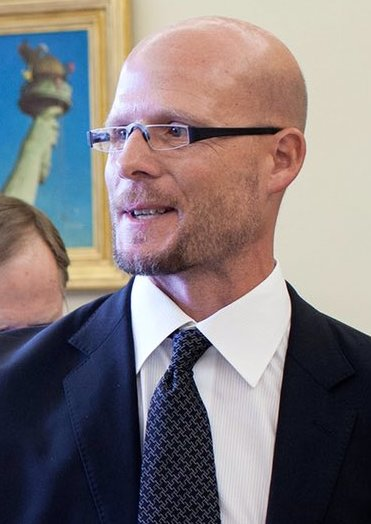
- Gilkey in 2009
- Born: January 5, 1966; Portland, Oregon
- Died: June 5, 2016 (aged 50); Marjah district, Helmand Province, Afghanistan
- Cause of death: Burns and smoke inhalation
- Education: Woodrow Wilson High School (Portland, Oregon); Oregon State University
- Occupation: Photojournalist
- Years active: 1996-2016
- Employer(s): National Public Radio (2007-2016) & Detroit Free Press (1996 - 2007)
- Known for: covering national and international news
- Awards: Free Press award in 2007 for his video series covering Marines deployed to Iraq, the George Polk Award in 2010 for the U.S. military's treatment of the wounded in 2010, Still Photographer of the Year in 2011

David P. Gilkey (January 5, 1966 – June 5, 2016) was a U.S. photojournalist for National Public Radio in the United States, for whom he covered disasters, epidemics and war.

It was originally reported that Gilkey and his native Afghan handler Zabihullah Tamanna were both killed during the War in Afghanistan by a rocket grenade while covering a skirmish between the Taliban and Afghan forces in the vicinity of Marjah, Helmand Province, Afghanistan. One year after their deaths, NPR clarified that a firefight with troops loyal to a Taliban leader named Mullah Ismail — not to be confused with another Mullah Ismail of the Taliban — had occurred while the reporters were on convoy and Tamanna was killed by gunfire and Gilkey by burns with smoke inhalation.

== Personal ==
David Gilkey was born in Portland, Oregon, and he is the son of Alyda Gilkey and Richard (Dick) Gilkey. As a child, Gilkey wanted to be a truck driver but he took up photography because his father had a dark room and taught David how to use a camera at an early age. He graduated from the class of 1985 from Woodrow Wilson High School in his hometown. Gilkey pursued his interest in photography in the mid-1980s when he went to study photojournalism at Oregon State and was a photojournalist for The Daily Barometer, the OSU student newspaper, but he did not complete his studies. Gilkey, who resided in Portland, Oregon, was 50 years old when he was killed in a combat zone.

== Career ==
Following an internship with Boulder Daily Camera, in the late 1980s Gilkey was hired on as a Staff Photographer. During his time at The Camera his hunger for international work grew. He persuaded editors to allow him a leave of absence from daily work, paid his own way, and with some financial assistance from paper owner Knight Ridder Gilkey traveled to South Africa to cover the end of Apartheid as well as the Rwandan genocide and the famine in Somalia.

In 1996 Gilkey was hired by the Detroit Free Press and worked there for the Knight Ridder media company for 11 years. During his time at the Free Press Gilkey began his coverage of the War on Terror traveling to Afghanistan and then Iraq numerous times.

In 2007, he joined National Public Radio as a staff photographer and video editor. For NPR, Gilkey continuously covered wars and conflicts in countries, such as Afghanistan, Iraq, Israel/Palestine, and Gaza. Over the span of almost 20 years, Gilkey photographed events such as the ending of the apartheid regime in South Africa, the earthquake in Haiti, and the Ebola incident in Liberia.

An anthology of his work titled Pictures on the radio, spearheaded by former Free Press colleague Chip Somodevilla, is scheduled to be released January, 2021.

== Death ==
David Gilkey was killed in Marjah, Afghanistan

Gilkey was taking pictures and covering stories of war-related events in Afghanistan around the time of his death. Multiple attacks were happening between the Afghan military and Taliban fighters, and so Gilkey traveled to Marjah, located in southern Afghanistan, to cover the conflict. Gilkey was traveling with the Afghan military to cover fights near Marjah. A second vehicle was following behind Gilkey's, but this group was not harmed in the incident.

=== Context ===
At the time of Gilkey's death, the United States had been at war in Afghanistan for around 15 years although its involvement can be traced back to 1979 when the former Soviet Union invaded the country and the United States armed the Afghanistan rebels, which later gave rise to the Taliban. After the terrorist attack on September 11, 2001, the United States led by President George W. Bush attacked Afghanistan and the Taliban leadership for harboring Al-Qaeda and its leader Osama bin Laden. The United States involvement in Afghanistan entered a new phase when President Barack Obama began to draw down troops and Afghanistan entered talks with the Taliban. During summer 2015, Taliban and Afghan forces were fighting for Kunduz, and the Taliban managed to secure control there. Gilkey and his Afghani handler were covering the war during this new phase.

=== Impact ===
Since the War in Afghanistan began, over 26 journalists were killed and Gilkey and Tamanna became the 27th and 28th journalist to be killed there, according to the Committee to Protect Journalists.

=== Reactions ===
After Gilkey and Tamanna were killed, many of their colleagues at NPR paid tribute to the pair but especially Gilkey. According to Tom Goldman, "David was engaged, and you can see the care, interest, and love of the city through his work. He was a journalist and artist, for whatever the subject. A kind person as well. Quite a mix." NPR established The David Gilkey and Zabihullah Tamanna Memorial Fund for International Coverage and Photojournalism, backed by a $410,000 gift from the Corporation for Public Broadcasting, to provide equipment, training and support for NPR's international coverage and video journalism.

Another representative from the Detroit Free Press, Nancy Andrews, a director, said, "David could do work to make you weep, to make you feel. He could find the beauty in the horror."

Irina Bokova, director-general of United Nations Educational, Scientific and Cultural Organization, said, "I condemn the attack that claimed the lives of David Gilkey and Zabihullah Tamanna. The right of media workers to exercise their professional duties in safe conditions must be recognized in the interest of society as a whole."

President Barack Obama noted after Gilkey's death, the photographer “captured a breadth of truths across the world and showed the humanity of those he photographed, even under the most difficult circumstances.” Gilkey had previously met Obama as a White House News Photographers Association's award winner.

== Awards ==
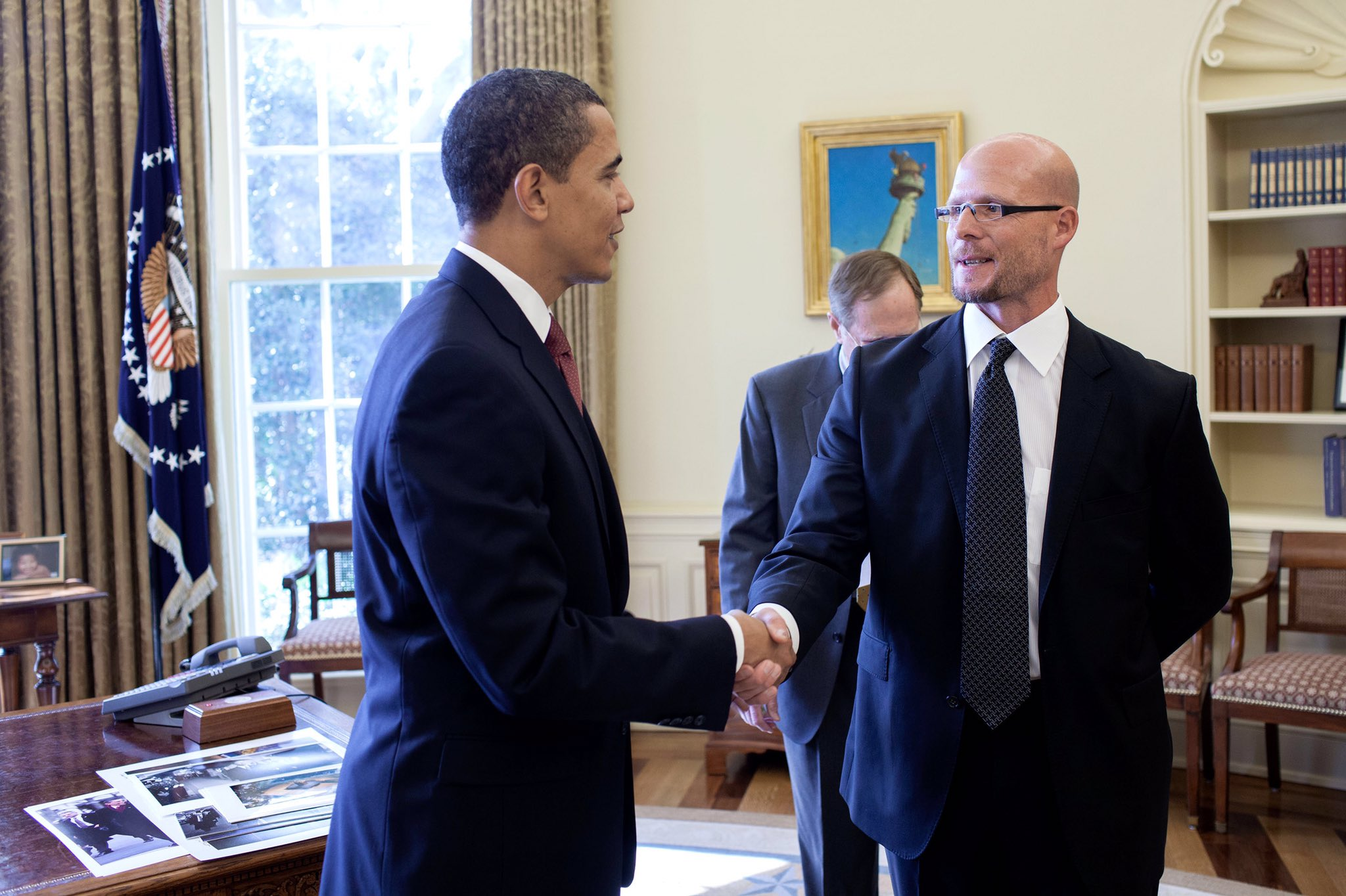
President Barack Obama greeted David Gilkey, one of the White House News Photographers Association's award winners, in the Oval Office on March 12, 2009. Official White House photograph by Pete Souza

David Gilkey received several awards for his work. He was named Michigan Photographer of the year in 2004 by the Michigan Press Photographers Association. In 2007, Gilkey received the Free Press Award, also referred to as the National Emmy Award, for his inspiring video series. This video was referred to as "Band of Brothers," which covered the deployment of marines in Iraq. He also received the 2010 George Polk Award for his coverage of the U.S. military and its treatment of the wounded. He was presented with the Still Photographer of the Year Award in 2011. He won the Peabody Award and Edward R. Murrow Award (Corporation for Public Broadcasting) for his coverage of the Ebola epidemic.

== See also ==
- List of journalists killed during the War in Afghanistan (2001–21)
- List of terrorist incidents in June 2016
- 2016 in radio
