= KBVR =

- Corvallis, Oregon; United States
- Frequency: 88.7 MHz

Programming
- Format: Variety

Ownership
- Owner: Oregon State University

History
- First air date: 1965
- Former frequencies: 90.1 MHz (1965–1977)
- Call sign meaning: Beaver, OSU mascot

Technical information
- Licensing authority: FCC
- Facility ID: 50623
- Class: A
- ERP: 340 watts
- HAAT: −25 meters (−82 ft)
- Transmitter coordinates: 44°33′50″N 123°16′30″W

Links
- Public license information: Public file; LMS
- Webcast: Listen Live
- Website: kbvrfm.orangemedianetwork.com

KBVR (88.7 FM) is a student-run non-commercial radio station broadcasting a variety format. Licensed to Corvallis, Oregon, United States, the station is currently owned by Oregon State University. KBVR is part of Orange Media Network, the student media department at OSU.

The station can be heard in about a 30-mile radius around Corvallis, depending on altitude. KBVR was founded in 1966.

== History ==
KBVR-FM 88.7 was originally broadcast from Shepherd Hall on the Oregon State University Campus in 1965 at 90.1 MHz with 10 watts of power and a 4 to 5 mile listening radius. The station relocated to Snell Hall in 1977, and continued to expand its listening area to the current radius of 30 miles using 340 watts of power and moved to its current 88.7 MHz frequency. The station relocated again in 2015 to its current location in the university's Student Experience Center.

In the first six months of operations, KBVR-FM (90.1 then) was only on the air from 6:00 to 7:00 pm Monday through Friday. In the past 37 years, however, KBVR has expanded considerably and currently KBVR covers the airwaves 24 hours a day, seven days a week and includes news, sports and talk variety shows. The show formats include indie rock, punk, jazz, blues, electronica, funk, hip-hop, nu metal and alternative metal, classical, world, and sports talk. The station also broadcasts live Beaver Football and Men's Basketball games.

The station is staffed entirely by students, and student volunteers serve as DJs.

The station's content has also expanded to include Cassette music blog, which covers local and national music. The KBVR-FM students also create a number of podcasts, available for streaming and download on the station's website, iTunes and Google Play.

KBVR-FM is funded by student fees and underwriting grants from local and national businesses.

== Awards ==
KBVR-FM was awarded first place for Best Radio Promo from the College Media Association Apple Awards back to back in 2016 and 2017. College Media Business & Advertising Managers awarded the station third place for Best Audio Ad/Underwriting Spot and third place for Best Self-Promotional Ad in 2017. In 2014, KBVR-FM took home a total of nine awards at the Intercollegiate Broadcasting Awards in New York City, including "Best College/University Station" for schools with over 10,000 students.

== See also ==
- Campus radio
- List of college radio stations in the United States
