= Oregon State University Ecampus =

Online education unit of Oregon State

- Type: Public; Distance education
- Established: 2002
- Parent institution: Oregon State University
- Students: 16,021
- Location: Corvallis (admin. office), Oregon, United States of America
- Website: www.ecampus.oregonstate.edu

Oregon State University Ecampus is the online education unit of Oregon State University. OSU Ecampus develops and delivers courses, degree programs, certificates and microcredentials online and at a distance to students worldwide. Ecampus courses and programs are delivered online as well as in a blended or hybrid format that combines virtual learning with face-to-face instruction.

In January 2026, the Oregon State Ecampus bachelor's degree programs were ranked top 10 in the nation by U.S. News & World Report for the 12th straight year.

Oregon State University is institutionally accredited by the Northwest Commission on Colleges and Universities (NWCCU).

== History ==
Oregon State University was one of the first colleges to bring distance-education classes to residents living hundreds of miles from a school's main campus. As early as the 1880s, farmers in rural Oregon could attend college-level lectures on agricultural science in their own cities and towns. Early lectures were often given on board a train's caboose and could be scheduled through the local train station. Over the next several decades, the university delivered pioneering programs in business management and manufacturing to residents of early Portland, Oregon and the larger cities along the Oregon Coast.

By 1980, OSU began offering a distance-learning degree in liberal studies to students living throughout Oregon. Coursework was delivered through video presentations and scheduled mail and phone correspondence with instructors. A few years later, the university offered its first coursework in liberal studies at Central Oregon Community College in Bend, Oregon. These classes eventually paved the way for the university to establish its first distance-degree program at COCC and later at community colleges throughout the state.

In 2002, OSU converted its Distance and Continuing Education program into the now-familiar OSU Ecampus. Today, OSU Ecampus is one of the top online universities in the nation and delivers more than 125 degrees, programs and microcredentials (a form of microdegree) online. Ecampus is under the leadership of Lisa L. Templeton, who assumed the role of executive director in November 2009. In 2023, she was appointed vice provost of the Division of Educational Ventures.

== Academics ==
Oregon State Ecampus partners with nearly 1,300 OSU faculty members annually to develop and deliver programs and courses online. All Ecampus classes are developed by the same Oregon State faculty who teach on campus. Oregon State offers more than 1,800 courses online. Working with Ecampus instructional designers to build an online course, OSU faculty use animations, readings, videos, conferences and other interactive materials for students online.

Ecampus delivers more than 125 undergraduate and graduate programs online, with some hybrid programs that feature face-to-face components. The programs cover an array of disciplines, including natural resources, liberal arts, education and science, technology, engineering, and mathematics (STEM).

== Students ==
Ecampus serves students in all 50 states and more than 50 countries. OSU's distance learners include full- and part-time students, working and retired professionals, community college students, active-duty and retired military, high school students, and lifelong learners.

A record 2,345 distance students received their diplomas from OSU in June 2025.

== Rankings ==
U.S. News & World Report recognized Oregon State University on many of its Best Online Programs lists in 2026.

- No. 6 in Best Online Bachelor’s Programs
- No. 1 in Best Online Bachelor’s in Psychology Programs
- No. 4 in Best Online Bachelor’s in Business Programs
- No. 13 in Best Online Bachelor’s Programs for Veterans
- No. 31 in Best Online Master’s in Engineering Programs
- No. 32 in Best Online Master’s in Education Programs
