= Deborah Reed =

Deborah Reed (née Brown) is an American author, born on November 7, 1963, in Detroit, Michigan. She graduated from John Glenn High School in 1981 in Westland, Michigan. In 1997, she graduated summa cum laude with a BA from Oregon State University. In 2012, she graduated with an MFA in creative writing from Pacific University. She is the author of five novels under her own name and two thrillers under the pen name Audrey Braun. She lives in Manzanita, Oregon, where she owns and manages a local bookstore.

== Works ==
Fiction

- Carry Yourself Back to Me, 2011
- Things We Set on Fire, 2013
- Komm wieder zurück: Roman (German Edition), 2013
- Was nach dem Feuer bleibt (German Edition), 2014
- Olivay, 2015
- The Days When Birds Come Back, 2018
- Pale Morning Light with Violet Swan, 2020

Fiction as Audrey Braun

- A Small Fortune, 2011
- Fortune's Deadly Descent, 2012

Nonfiction, Essays, Interviews

- "The Art of Reading Per Petterson: Finding Appalachia in a Norwegian Novel"
- "What the Dog Knows"
