= List of first minority male lawyers and judges in Wisconsin =

This is a list of the first minority male lawyer(s) and judge(s) in Wisconsin. It includes the year in which the men were admitted to practice law (in parentheses). Also included are men who achieved other distinctions such becoming the first in their state to graduate from law school or become a political figure.

== Firsts in Wisconsin's history ==
=== Lawyers ===
- First Jewish American male: Nathan Pereles (1857)
- First African American male: Everett E. Simpson (1888)
- First African American male to argue a case before the Wisconsin Supreme Court: William T. Green (1892)
- First Native American (Oneida) male: Dennison Wheelock (1911)
- First Native American male admitted to state bar: Thomas "Ted" St. Germaine (1932)
- First African American male public defender from Wisconsin to argue a case before the U.S. Supreme Court: Louis B. Butler (1977) in 1998

=== State judges ===
- First African American male (justice of the peace): J.C. Perkins in 1903
- First Jewish American male (circuit court): Charles L. Aarons in 1925
- First African American male to run for judicial seat: Andrew R. Reneau in 1955
- First Italian American male: John Fiorenza in 1966
- First African American male: Harold Jackson Jr. in 1972
- First Hispanic American male: Ness Flores in 1978
- First male judge (who is deaf) to use a computerized transcription system in a Wisconsin court: Richard S. Brown in 1983
- First African American male elected without being appointed by a governor: Carl Ashley in 1999
- First Latino American male elected to the circuit court without being appointed by a governor: Ralph Ramirez around 1999
- First African American male (Wisconsin Court of Appeals): Paul B. Higginbotham (1985) in 2003
- First Asian American male (Japanese ancestry): Glenn H. Yamahiro (1991) in 2003
- First African American male (Wisconsin Supreme Court): Louis B. Butler (1977) in 2004
- First Latino American male (Wisconsin Court of Appeals): Pedro Colón in 2023
- First Filipino American male: Raphael Ramos in 2023

=== Federal judges ===
- First African American male (U.S. Bankruptcy Court in Wisconsin): Charles N. Clevert Jr. (1972) in 1977
- First African American male (U.S. District Court for the Eastern District of Wisconsin): Charles N. Clevert Jr. (1972) in 1995

=== Assistant United States Attorney ===
- First African American male: Grady L. Pettigrew, Jr. in 1975

=== District Attorney ===
- First African American male: Ismael Ozanne in 2010

=== Assistant District Attorney ===
- First African American male: Andrew R. Reneau

=== State Bar of Wisconsin ===
- First Jewish American male president: Benjamin Poss in 1937

== Firsts in local history ==
- Daniel Bernstine: First African American male to serve as the Dean of University of Wisconsin Law School (1990)
- Paul B. Higginbotham: First African American judge in Dane County, Wisconsin (1994). He was also the first African American municipal court judge in Madison, Wisconsin (1992).
- Juan Colas: First Hispanic American male judge in Dane County, Wisconsin (2008)
- Ismael Ozanne: First African American male to serve as the District Attorney of Dane County, Wisconsin (2010)
- Paul Rigopoulos: First Greek American male lawyer in Fitchburg, Wisconsin [Dane County, Wisconsin]
- E. Ward Winton: First Native American male law graduate from the University of Wisconsin (1920) [Madison, Dane County, Wisconsin]
- Nathan Pereles: First Jewish American male lawyer in Milwaukee, Wisconsin
- Casimir Gonski (1893): First Polish lawyer in Milwaukee, Milwaukee County, Wisconsin
- William T. Green (1892): First African American male lawyer in Milwaukee, Milwaukee County, Wisconsin
- Francis X. Swietlik: First Polish male to serve as the Assistant District Attorney of Milwaukee County, Wisconsin (1926)
- George Yep (1949): First Chinese American male lawyer in Milwaukee, Milwaukee County, Wisconsin
- Harold B. Jackson, Jr.: First African American male to serve as the Assistant District Attorney of Milwaukee County, Wisconsin
- Clarence Parrish: First African American male to win a judicial seat in Milwaukee County, Wisconsin (1981)
- Brett Blomme: First openly LGBT male to win a judicial seat in Milwaukee County, Wisconsin (2020)
- Tearman Spencer: First African American male to serve as the Milwaukee City Attorney (2021) [Milwaukee, Washington, Waukesha Counties, Wisconsin]
- Ralph Ramirez: First Hispanic American male elected as a circuit court judge in Waukesha County, Wisconsin

== See also ==
- List of first minority male lawyers and judges in the United States

== Other topics of interest ==
- List of first women lawyers and judges in the United States
- List of first women lawyers and judges in Wisconsin
