= William Pocan =

American judge (born 1961)

Judge of the Milwaukee County Circuit Court
- Incumbent
- Assumed office July 14, 2006
- Appointed by: Jim Doyle
- Preceded by: Michael P. Sullivan

Personal details
- Born: 1961 (age 64–65) Kenosha, Wisconsin, U.S.
- Relations: Mark Pocan (brother)
- Education: University of Wisconsin–Parkside (BA); University of Wisconsin–Madison (JD)

William S. Pocan Jr. (born 1961) is an American lawyer and jurist serving as deputy chief judge of the 1st district of Wisconsin circuit courts. He has served as a Wisconsin circuit court judge in Milwaukee County since 2006. In 2021, he was nominated by U.S. President Joe Biden to serve as a United States district judge for the Eastern District of Wisconsin, but his nomination expired without a hearing at the end of the 117th Congress.

== Early life and education ==
William Pocan was born and raised in Kenosha, Wisconsin. He attended Mary D. Bradford High School and graduated early, entering college at age 16. He earned a Bachelor of Arts degree from the University of Wisconsin–Parkside in 1981 and a Juris Doctor from the University of Wisconsin Law School in 1984.

== Career ==
Pocan began his legal career at Brookhouse & Brookhouse in Kenosha, Wisconsin, where he worked from 1984 to 1985. From 1985 to 2006, he was an associate at Jastroch & LaBarge. In 2006, Pocan was appointed a Wisconsin circuit court judge in Milwaukee County by Governor Jim Doyle. Pocan was subsequently elected to a full six-year term on the court in 2007, and was then re-elected twice without opposition. He was appointed deputy chief judge of the first district of Wisconsin circuit courts (Milwaukee County) in 2020. At various times, Pocan presided over juvenile, civil, and felony division cases.

=== Nominations to district court ===
In 2014, Pocan was one of three finalists recommended to President Barack Obama by the bipartisan Wisconsin Federal Nominating Commission to fill a vacancy on the federal district court bench, but Pamela Pepper received the nomination instead.

On December 15, 2021, President Joe Biden nominated Pocan to serve as a United States district judge of the United States District Court for the Eastern District of Wisconsin. Pocan was one of four finalists recommended to the president earlier in 2021 by the Wisconsin Federal Nominating Commission. Biden nominated Pocan to the seat vacated by Judge William C. Griesbach, who took senior status on December 31, 2019.

On February 15, 2022, U.S. Senator Ron Johnson announced he would withhold his blue slip, effectively blocking Pocan from receiving a hearing in the Senate Judiciary Committee, despite having previously recommended Pocan in a letter to the White House on June 22, 2021. On January 3, 2023, his nomination was returned to the President under Rule XXXI, Paragraph 6 of the United States Senate.

== Personal life ==
Pocan's father, William S. Pocan Sr., was an alderman on the Kenosha city council during the 1970s and 1980s.

Pocan's younger brother, Mark Pocan, is a member of the United States House of Representatives for Wisconsin's 2nd congressional district. Both Pocan brothers are gay.

== Electoral history ==
=== Wisconsin circuit court (2007–present) ===
Year	Election	Date	Elected				Defeated				Total	Plurality
2007	General	Apr. 3	William S. Pocan (inc)	Nonpartisan	40,917	50.21%	Chris Liegel	Non.	40,097	49.20%	81,497	820
2013	General	Apr. 3	William S. Pocan (inc)	Nonpartisan	60,343	98.40%	--unopposed--				61,326	
2019	General	Apr. 2	William S. Pocan (inc)	Nonpartisan	87,258	98.37%	--unopposed--				88,487	
2025	General	Apr. 1	William S. Pocan (inc)	Nonpartisan	187,988	98.61%	--unopposed--				191,095	

== See also ==
- Joe Biden judicial appointment controversies
- List of LGBT jurists in the United States

Legal offices
Preceded by Michael P. Sullivan	Wisconsin Circuit Court Judge for the Milwaukee Circuit, Branch 26; July 14, 2006 – present	Incumbent
