= Brett H. Ludwig =

American judge (born 1969)

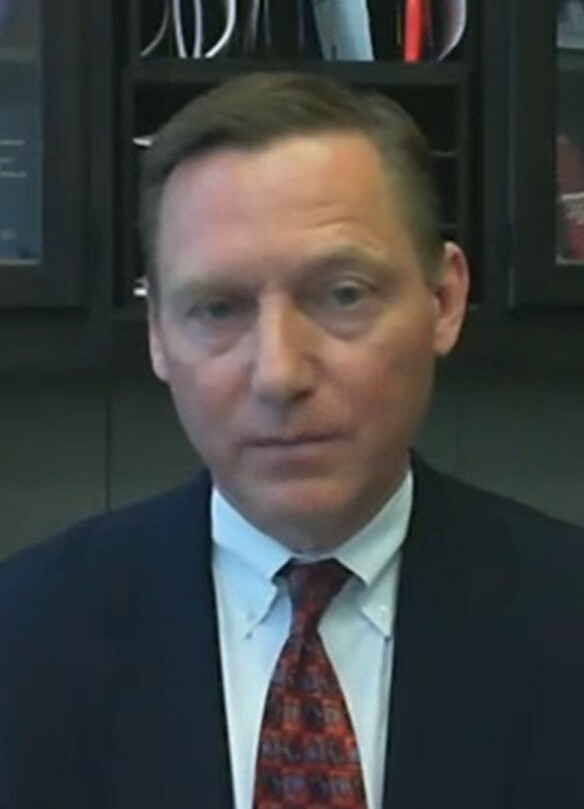

Judge of the United States District Court for the Eastern District of Wisconsin
- Incumbent
- Assumed office September 10, 2020
- Appointed by: Donald Trump
- Preceded by: Rudolph T. Randa

Judge of the United States Bankruptcy Court for the Eastern District of Wisconsin
- In office 2017 – September 10, 2020

Personal details
- Born: 1969 (age 56–57) Marshfield, Wisconsin, U.S.
- Education: University of Wisconsin-Stevens Point (BA); University of Minnesota (JD)

Brett Harry Ludwig (born 1969) is a United States district judge of the United States District Court for the Eastern District of Wisconsin. He is a former Judge of the United States Bankruptcy Court for the Eastern District of Wisconsin.

== Education ==
Ludwig earned his Bachelor of Arts from the University of Wisconsin–Stevens Point and his Juris Doctor, magna cum laude, from the University of Minnesota School of Law.

== Career ==
Upon graduating from law school, Ludwig served as a law clerk to Judge George Fagg of the United States Court of Appeals for the Eighth Circuit. He was a partner at Foley & Lardner in Milwaukee, where he focused on commercial litigation and dispute resolution and chaired the firm's pro bono practice. He has also taught at the Marquette University Law School.

=== Federal judicial service ===
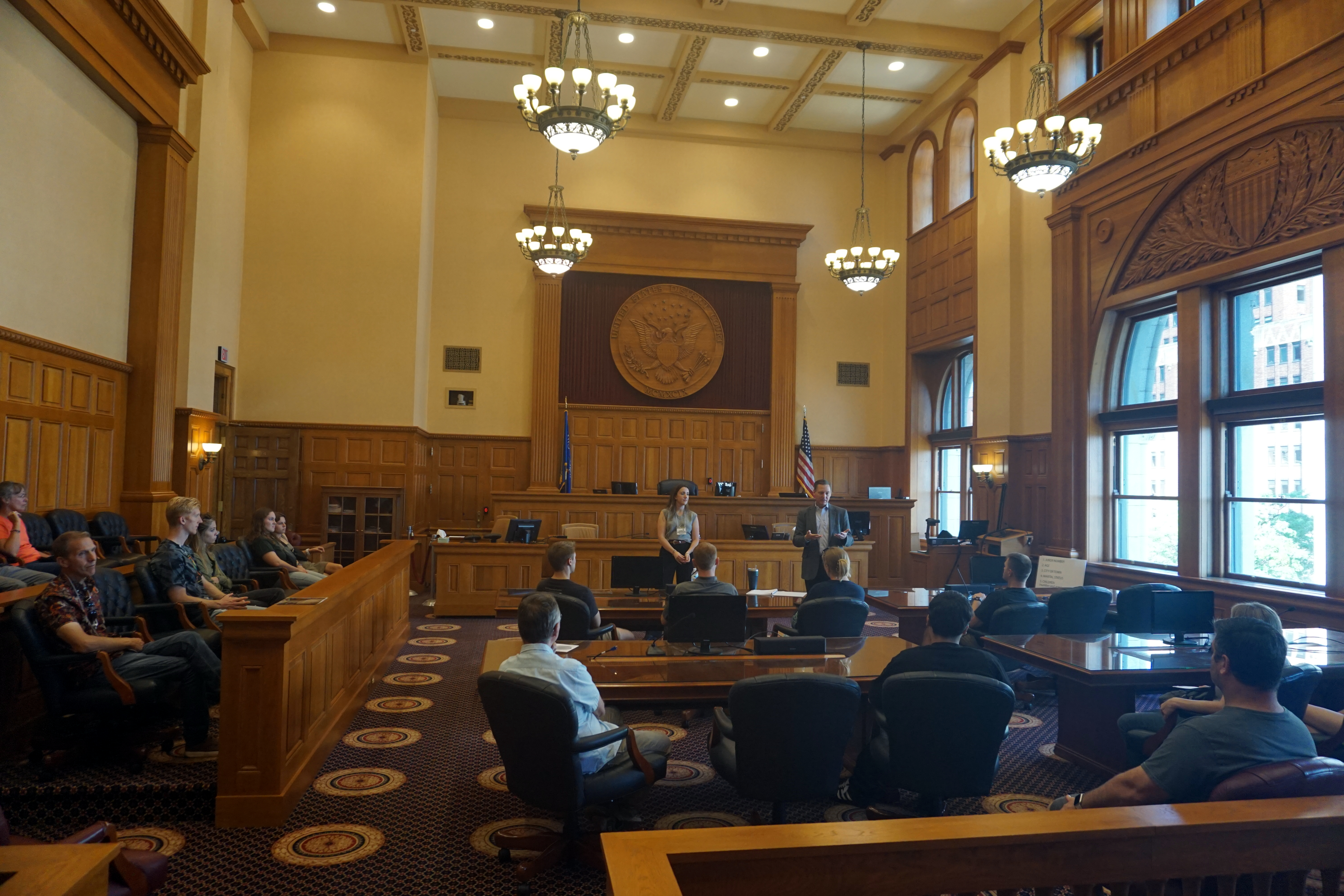
Courtroom of U.S. District Judge Hon. Brett H. Ludwig in Milwaukee's Federal Building

Ludwig became a judge of the United States Bankruptcy Court for the Eastern District of Wisconsin in 2017 and served on that court until becoming a district judge.

On February 26, 2020, President Donald Trump announced his intent to nominate Ludwig to serve as a United States district judge of the United States District Court for the Eastern District of Wisconsin. On March 3, 2020, his nomination was sent to the Senate. President Trump nominated Ludwig to the seat vacated by Judge Rudolph T. Randa, who assumed senior status on February 5, 2016. On June 17, 2020, a hearing on his nomination was held before the Senate Judiciary Committee. On July 23, 2020, his nomination was reported out of committee by a voice vote. On September 8, 2020, the United States Senate invoked cloture on his nomination by a 83–6 vote. On September 9, 2020, his nomination was confirmed by a 91–5 vote. He received his judicial commission on September 10, 2020.

=== Notable cases ===
On December 12, 2020, Ludwig dismissed a lawsuit filed by Donald Trump and his lawyers against the Wisconsin Elections Commission in an effort to overturn the results of the 2020 United States presidential election in Wisconsin. In filing the lawsuit, Trump falsely claimed that the electors from the state of Wisconsin were not chosen in a lawful manner in violation of the Electors Clause of the constitution. However, Ludwig rejected that argument stating Trump's claim "confuses and conflates the 'Manner' of appointing presidential electors—popular election—with underlying rules of election administration." Ludwig noted that the Electors were chosen based on the winner of the state popular vote, the manner established by the Wisconsin Legislature. Claims based on the guidance to indefinitely confined voters, the use of drop boxes, and corrections to addresses for absentee ballots were claims based on the administration of the election, not the "manner" as it is understood in the Constitution.

In his decision, Ludwig regularly noted the "extraordinary" nature of the case and what Trump was asking for in relief. In the conclusion of his opinion, Ludwig wrote, "This is an extraordinary case. A sitting president who did not prevail in his bid for reelection has asked for federal court help in setting aside the popular vote based on disputed issues of election administration, issues he plainly could have raised before the vote occurred. This Court has allowed plaintiff the chance to make his case and he has lost on the merits. In his reply brief, plaintiff 'asks that the Rule of Law be followed.' (Pl. Br., ECF No. 109.) It has been."

Legal offices
Preceded by Rudolph T. Randa	Judge of the United States District Court for the Eastern District of Wisconsin; 2020–present	Incumbent
