= Michael B. Brennan =

American judge (born 1963)

Mike Brennan
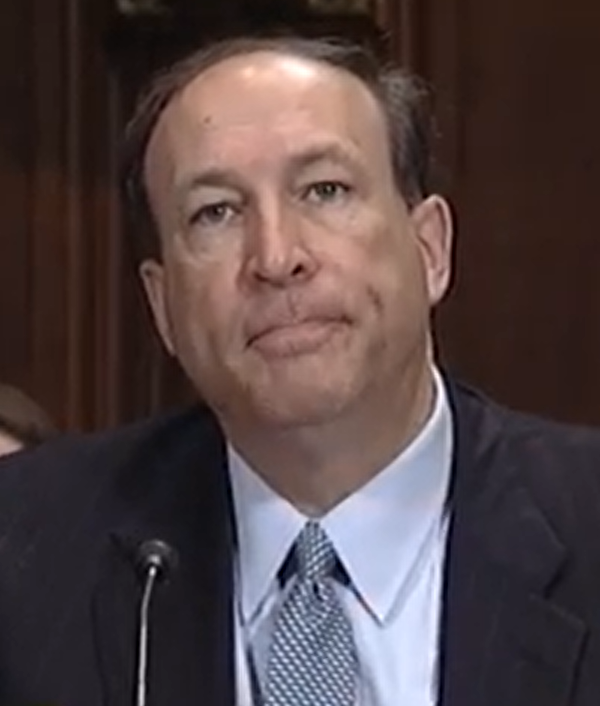

Chief Judge of the United States Court of Appeals for the Seventh Circuit
- Incumbent
- Assumed office October 1, 2025
- Preceded by: Diane S. Sykes

Judge of the United States Court of Appeals for the Seventh Circuit
- Incumbent
- Assumed office May 11, 2018
- Appointed by: Donald Trump
- Preceded by: Terence T. Evans

Judge of the Milwaukee County Circuit Court Branch 15
- In office January 2000 – November 30, 2008
- Appointed by: Tommy Thompson
- Preceded by: Ronald Goldberger
- Succeeded by: J. D. Watts

Personal details
- Born: Michael Brian Brennan; 1963 (age 62–63) Milwaukee, Wisconsin, U.S.
- Education: University of Notre Dame (BA); Northwestern University (JD)

Michael Brian Brennan (born 1963) is the chief United States circuit judge of the United States Court of Appeals for the Seventh Circuit. He was first nominated on August 3, 2017, by President Donald Trump, and was re-nominated in 2018. He was confirmed May 10, 2018. He was previously a partner in the Milwaukee law firm Gass Weber Mullins LLC, and served 8 years as a Wisconsin Circuit Court judge.

== Early life and education ==
Brennan received his Bachelor of Arts degree in government and philosophy, cum laude, from the University of Notre Dame in 1986, and his Juris Doctor from Northwestern University School of Law in 1988, where he served as the coordinating note and comment editor of the Northwestern University Law Review and won the Julius H. Miner Moot Court Competition.

Brennan served as a law clerk to Chief Judge Robert W. Warren of the United States District Court for the Eastern District of Wisconsin from 1989 to 1991 and also for Judge Daniel Anthony Manion of the United States Court of Appeals for the Seventh Circuit from 1995 to 1997.

== Legal career ==
From 1991 to 1995, Brennan was a litigation associate in the Milwaukee office of Foley & Lardner LLP. He later became an assistant district attorney in Milwaukee County, where he first-chaired numerous trials.

In 1999, Brennan was appointed by Wisconsin Governor Tommy Thompson to serve as a judge of the Milwaukee County Circuit Court. Taking office in January 2000, he served in this position until November 30, 2008, presiding over almost 300 trials and thousands of motions in criminal and civil cases. During that time, he served as the presiding judge of the civil division of that court.

Brennan returned to private practice in 2009 and became a partner at the law firm of Gass Weber Mullins, where he was a trial lawyer in the area of commercial litigation and handled appeals in federal and state courts. He was a partner before being confirmed to the Seventh Circuit. Brennan is a mediator and an AAA certified arbitrator and has published more than 50 articles on federal practice and procedure and criminal sentencing.

From 2011 to 2017, Brennan served as the chairperson of Governor Scott Walker's Judicial Selection Advisory Committee.

== Federal judicial service ==
On August 3, 2017, President Donald Trump nominated Brennan to serve as a United States Circuit Judge of the United States Court of Appeals for the Seventh Circuit, to the seat vacated by Judge Terence T. Evans, who assumed senior status on January 17, 2010. On January 3, 2018, his nomination was returned to the President under Rule XXXI, Paragraph 6 of the United States Senate.

Upon the announcement of his nomination, Senator Tammy Baldwin criticized President Trump for bypassing the bipartisan commission composed to vet potential judicial candidates. She withheld her blue slip. However, her Republican counterpart in the Senate, Senator Ron Johnson, supported his nomination. On January 5, 2018, President Donald Trump announced his intent to renominate Brennan to the Seventh Circuit. On January 8, 2018, his renomination was sent to the Senate. On January 24, 2018, a hearing on his nomination was held before the Senate Judiciary Committee. On February 15, 2018, his nomination was reported out of the committee by an 11–10 vote. Democrats strongly objected to the vote, noting that Senator Tammy Baldwin was still withholding her blue slip. On May 9, 2018, the Senate agreed to invoke cloture on his nomination by a 49–47 vote. Brennan's nomination was confirmed on May 10, 2018, by a 49–46 vote. He received his judicial commission on May 11, 2018.

== Affiliations and awards ==
Brennan is the founder of the Milwaukee chapter of the Federalist Society. He has served as a member of the Wisconsin Legislative Council's Special Committee on Crimes against Children. He received a special commendation from the United States Department of Justice for his service as a member of the National Advisory Committee on Violence Against Women.

== Electoral history ==
Wisconsin Circuit Court, Milwaukee Circuit, Branch 15 Election, 2001
Party	Candidate	Votes	%	±%
General Election, April 3, 2001
Nonpartisan	Michael B. Brennan (incumbent)	50,807	99.03%	
	Scattering	497	0.97%	
Total votes		51,304	100.0%	

Wisconsin Circuit Court, Milwaukee Circuit, Branch 15 Election, 2007
Party	Candidate	Votes	%	±%
General Election, April 3, 2007
Nonpartisan	Michael B. Brennan (incumbent)	66,617	98.97%	
	Scattering	695	1.03%	
Total votes		67,312	100.0%	+31.20%

== See also ==
- Donald Trump judicial appointment controversies

Legal offices
Preceded by Terence T. Evans	Judge of the United States Court of Appeals for the Seventh Circuit; 2018–present	Incumbent
Preceded by Diane S. Sykes	Chief Judge of the United States Court of Appeals for the Seventh Circuit; 2025–present	Incumbent
