= List of first women lawyers and judges in Wisconsin =

This is a list of the first women lawyer(s) and judge(s) in Wisconsin. It includes the year in which the women were admitted to practice law (in parentheses). Also included are women who achieved other distinctions such becoming the first in their state to graduate from law school or become a political figure.

== Firsts in Wisconsin's history ==
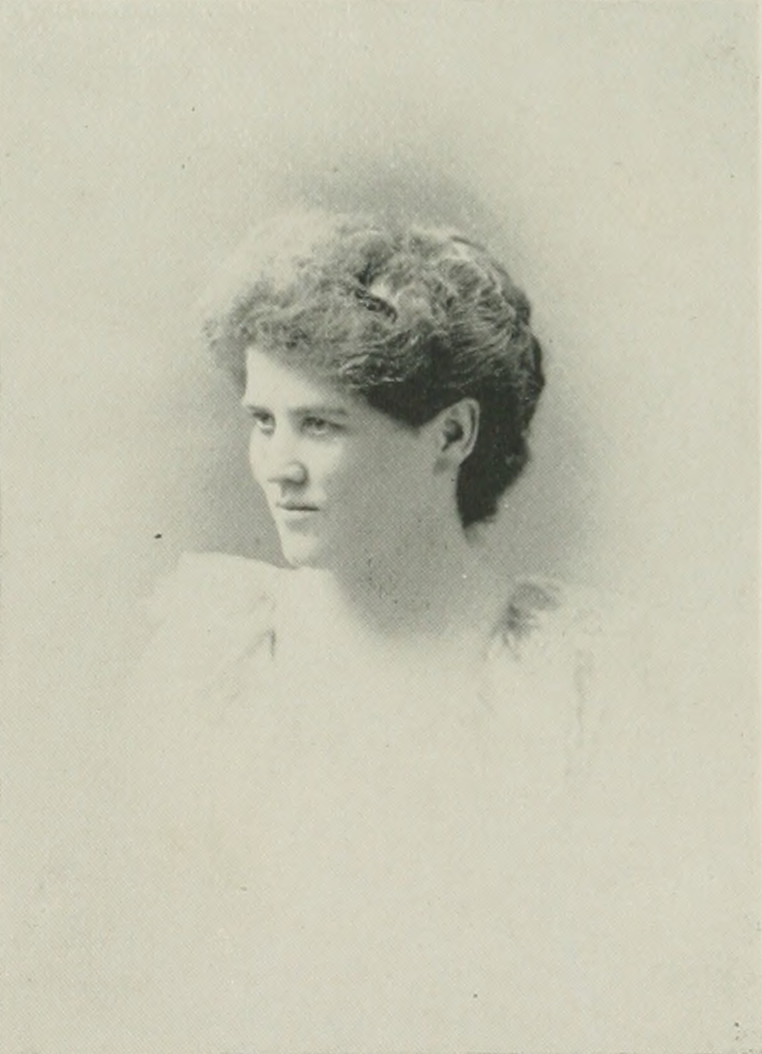
Belle Case La Follette: First female to earn a law degree in Wisconsin

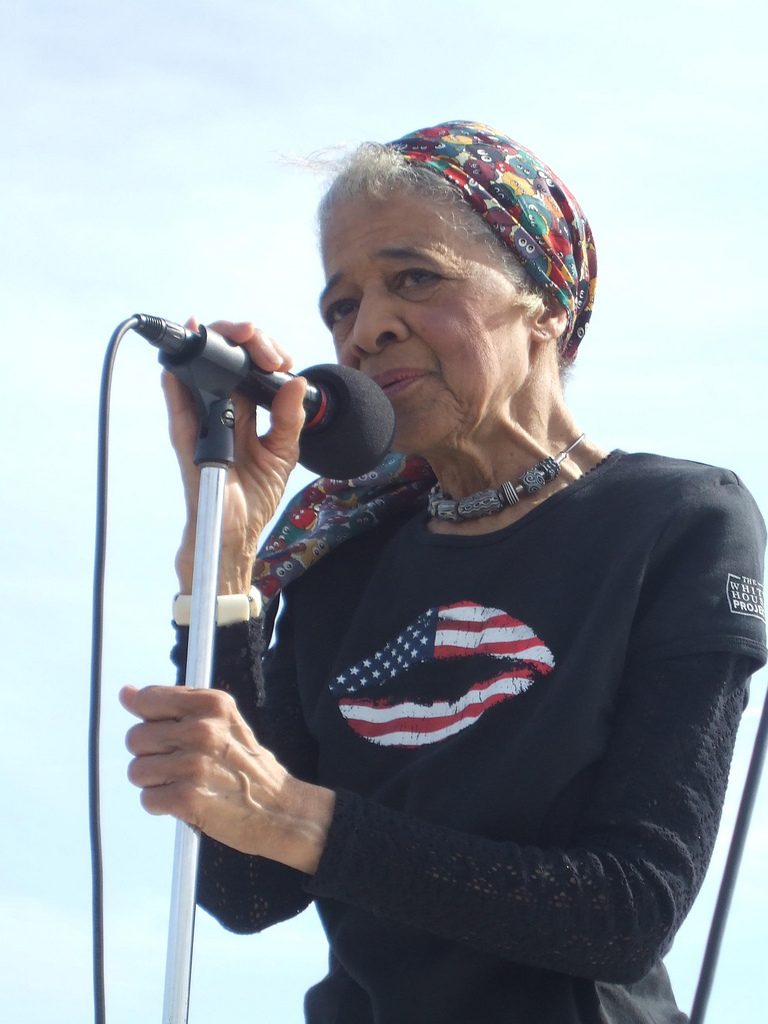
Vel Phillips: First African American female judge in Wisconsin (1971)

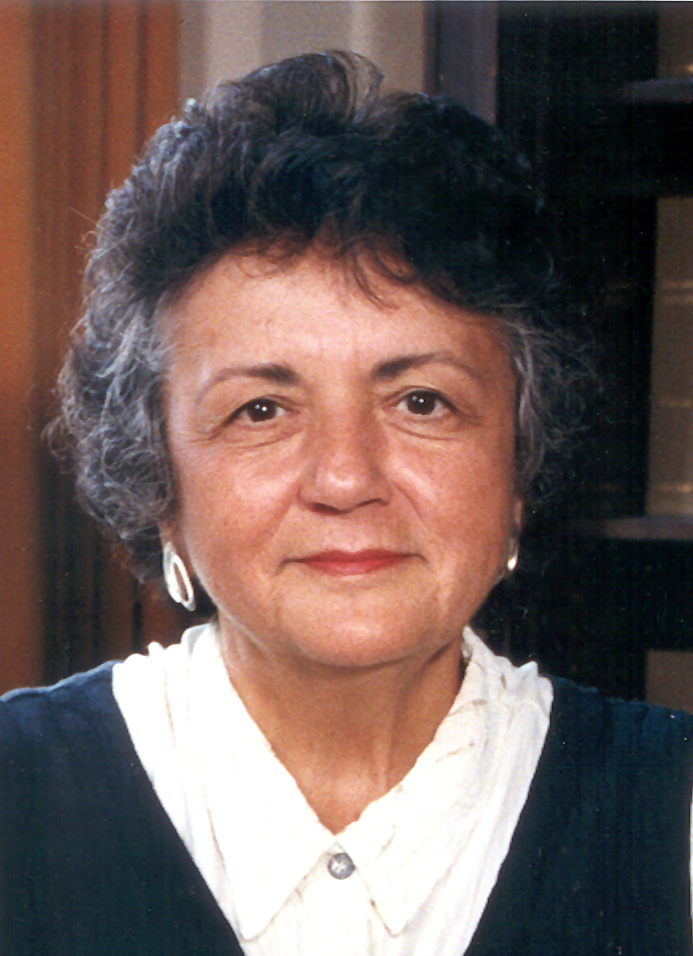
Shirley Abrahamson: First female Justice of the Wisconsin Supreme Court (1976)

=== Law School ===
- First female law graduate: Belle Case La Follette (1885)

=== Lawyers ===
- First females: Lavinia Goodell and Elsie B. Botensek (1875)
- First African American female: Mabel Watson Raimey (1927)

=== State judges ===
- First female (tribal judge for the Menominee): Rhoda House in 1943
- First female: Olga Bennett (1935) in 1970
- First African American female: Vel Phillips in 1971
- First female (Chief Judge; First Judicial District): Kitty K. Brennan (1977)
- First female (Wisconsin Supreme Court): Shirley Abrahamson (1962) in 1976
- First openly lesbian female: Shelley Gaylord in 1993
- First Latino American female (circuit court): Elsa Lamelas in 1993
- First female (Chief Justice; Wisconsin Supreme Court): Shirley Abrahamson (1962) in 1996
- First Hmong American (female): Kashoua Kristy Yang (2009) in 2017
- First African American female (judge elected without being appointed by a governor): Danielle L. Shelton in 2019
- First African American female (Chief Judge; Wisconsin Court of Appeals): Maxine Aldridge White in 2023
- First Indian American (female): Nidhi Kashyap in 2022

=== Attorney General of Wisconsin ===
- First female: Peg Lautenschlager (1980) from 2003-2007

=== Deputy Attorney General ===
- First female: Adaline Toner

=== Assistant Attorneys General (Wisconsin Department of Justice) ===
- First female: Adeline J. Meyer in 1928
- First Latino American female: Michelle L. Ramirez (c. 1994)

=== United States Attorney ===
- First female (U.S. Attorney for the Western District of Wisconsin): Peg Lautenschlager (1980) from 1993-2001

=== District Attorney ===
- First female: Dorothy Walker (c. 1922)
- First Native American (female; Lac du Flambeau Tribe): Rebecca Maki-Wallander in 2024

=== Political Office ===
- First openly lesbian female (U.S. Senate): Tammy Baldwin (1989) in 2012

=== State Bar of Wisconsin ===
- First female (president): Pamela Barker
- First African American (female): Michelle Behnke in 2004

== Firsts in local history ==
- Rose Patricia Ryan (1928): First female lawyer in Appleton, Wisconsin [Calumet, Outagamie, and Winnebago Counties, Wisconsin]
- Katherine Williams: First female to earn a law degree from Marquette University in Milwaukee, Wisconsin (1909)
- Elizabeth Hawkes (1937): First female Washburn High School graduate to become a lawyer [Bayfield County, Wisconsin]
- Vivi L. Dilweg: First female judge in Brown County, Wisconsin
- Moria Krueger: First female judge in Dane County, Wisconsin
- Nia Trammell: First African American female to serve as a Judge in Dane County Circuit Court (2020).
- Jennifer Moeller: First female judge in Door County, Wisconsin (2024)
- Lisa K. Stark: First female judge in Eau Claire County, Wisconsin (2000)
- Lisa Riniker: First female judge in Grant County, Wisconsin (2023)
- Anna Becker (1993): First female judge in Jackson County, Wisconsin (1982)
- Razy Geraldine Kletecka Chojnacki (1943): First female lawyer in La Crosse County, Wisconsin
- Jenna Gill: First female judge in Lafayette County, Wisconsin (2024)
- Kate Kane Rossi (1877): First female lawyer in Milwaukee, Wisconsin [Milwaukee County, Wisconsin]
- Mabel Watson Raimey (1927): First African American female lawyer in Milwaukee, Wisconsin [Milwaukee County, Wisconsin]
- Vel Phillips: First female judge (and African American female) in Milwaukee County, Wisconsin
- Elsa Lamelas: First Latino American female to serve as a Judge of the Milwaukee County Circuit Court (1993)
- Kitty K. Brennan (1977): First female to become Chief Judge of the First Judicial District in Milwaukee County, Wisconsin
- Kashoua "Kristy" Yang (2009): First Hmong American female judge in Milwaukee County, Wisconsin (2017)
- Maxine White: First African American female to serve as the Chief Judge for Milwaukee County, Wisconsin (2019)
- Ana Berrios-Schroeder: First Latino American female to serve as a Judge in Branch 13 of the Milwaukee County Circuit Court (2023)
- Mary Roth Burns: First female judge in Oneida County, Wisconsin (2022)
- Nancy Krueger (1979): First female judge in Outagamie County, Wisconsin (2007)
- Yadira Rein: First person of color to serve as a judge in Outagamie County, Wisconsin (2021)
- Sandy A. Williams: First female judge in Ozaukee County, Wisconsin (2009). She also served as the first female District Attorney for Ozaukee County.
- Patricia Baker: First female judge in Portage County, Wisconsin (2020)
- Nettie Elizabeth Karcher (1915): First female lawyer in Racine County, Wisconsin
- Sheila Mildred Parrish-Spence: First African-American female to serve as an Assistant District Attorney in Racine County, Wisconsin (1980)
- Toni Young: First African American (female) judge in Racine County, Wisconsin (2023)
- Barbara McCrory: First female judge in Rock County, Wisconsin (2012)
- Virginia A. Wolfe: First female judge in Sauk County, Wisconsin (1988)
- Monica Isham: First Native American (female) judge elected in Sawyer County, Wisconsin (2023)
- Edith Arelisle Zufelt (1901): First female to register with the Sheboygan County Bar Association [Sheboygan County, Wisconsin]
- Natasha Torry: First African American female elected as a municipal court judge in Sheboygan County, Wisconsin (2015)
- Olga Bennett (c. 1956): First female lawyer in Vernon County, Wisconsin
- Martha Milanowski: First female judge of Vilas County Circuit Court, Wisconsin (2021)
- Annette Ziegler: First female judge in Washington County, Wisconsin (1997)
- Peg Lautenschlager (1980): First female to serve as District Attorney for Winnebago County, Wisconsin (1985-1988)
- LaKeisha Haase: First African American (female) judge in Winnebago County, Wisconsin (2020)

== See also ==
- List of first women lawyers and judges in the United States
- Timeline of women lawyers in the United States
- Women in law

== Other topics of interest ==
- List of first minority male lawyers and judges in the United States
- List of first minority male lawyers and judges in Wisconsin
