= Robert C. Cannon =

American lawyer and judge

The Honorable Robert C. Cannon

Presiding Judge of the Wisconsin Court of Appeals District I
- In office August 1, 1978 – July 31, 1979
- Preceded by: Position established
- Succeeded by: William R. Moser

Judge of the Wisconsin Court of Appeals District I
- In office August 1, 1978 – August 1, 1981
- Preceded by: Position established
- Succeeded by: Rudolph T. Randa

Personal details
- Born: June 10, 1917 Milwaukee, Wisconsin, US
- Died: October 22, 2008 (aged 91) Saint John's on the Lake, Milwaukee, Wisconsin, US
- Resting place: Holy Cross Cemetery and Mausoleum, Milwaukee, Wisconsin
- Spouse: Helen E. Gildea (m. 1942; died 2004)
- Children: 6
- Parent: Raymond J. Cannon (father)
- Profession: lawyer, judge

Robert C. Cannon (June 10, 1917 – October 22, 2008) was an American lawyer and judge. He served as presiding judge of the Wisconsin Court of Appeals in the Milwaukee-based District I court. Earlier in his career, he was significantly involved in Major League Baseball, worked to bring the Milwaukee Brewers franchise to Milwaukee, and came within one vote of being elected Commissioner of Baseball.

== Biography ==
Born in Milwaukee, Wisconsin, Cannon was married and had six children. In 1941, he graduated from Marquette University Law School. His father was Raymond Cannon, who served in the United States House of Representatives. He died on October 22, 2008.

== Baseball ==
Heavily involved in bringing the Seattle Pilots franchise (now the Milwaukee Brewers) to Milwaukee from Seattle, Washington. He came within one vote of being elected Commissioner of Major League Baseball. Later, he worked as Legal Counsel to the Major League Baseball Players Association for six years.

== Judicial career ==
Cannon was elected to the Milwaukee Civil Court in 1946. He joined the Wisconsin Court of Appeals in 1978, immediately becoming a Presiding Judge and remaining one until 1979. In 1981, he retired from full-time judicial duty but remained a reserve judge.

In August 1968, Fr. James Groppi led a demonstration outside of Judge Cannon’s Wauwatosa home over his membership in the Fraternal Order of the Eagles, which restricted its membership to whites only. Robed Klansmen turned out in counter protest. Other residents held signs saying such things as “Keep Tosa White.” Cannon told the press, “I will remain in the Eagles as long as I live.”

== Electoral history ==
=== Wisconsin Court of Appeals (1978) ===
Wisconsin Court of Appeals, District I Election, 1978
Party	Candidate	Votes	%	±%
General Election, April 3, 1984
Nonpartisan	Robert C. Cannon	56,817	100.0%	
Total votes		56,817	100.0%	

Legal offices
New court	Judge of the Wisconsin Court of Appeals District I August 1, 1978 – July 31, 1979	Succeeded by Rudolph T. Randa
New court	Presiding Judge of the Wisconsin Court of Appeals District I August 1, 1978 – August 1, 1981	Succeeded by William R. Moser
