= Mabel Watson Raimey =

American lawyer

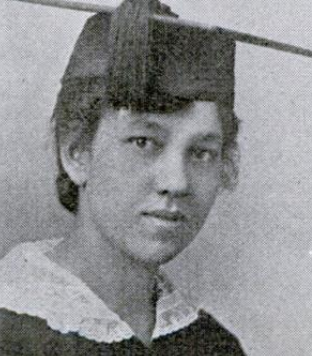
- Mabel Watson Raimey, from a 1918 publication
- Born: December 12, 1895; Milwaukee, Wisconsin
- Died: December 1, 1986; Milwaukee, Wisconsin
- Occupation: Lawyer

Mabel Watson Raimey (December 12, 1895 – December 1, 1986) was Wisconsin’s first African American female lawyer.

Raimey was born on December 12, 1895, in Milwaukee, Wisconsin, to Anthony and Nellie Raimey. Since she was light-skinned, there were instances in which Raimey (whether intentional or not) was able to pass in Wisconsin. She was the first African American female to earn a bachelor's degree from University of Wisconsin-Madison in 1918.

Raimey initially worked as an educator for the Milwaukee school district until it was discovered that she had Black ancestry. She was fired thereafter and, while working as a legal secretary, Raimey decided to attend an evening law program offered by Marquette University Law School. Unfortunately, the program dissipated by 1924. Nevertheless, in 1927, Raimey became the first African American female admitted to practice law in Wisconsin. Due to few employment opportunities, Raimey continued to work as a legal secretary until she finally got the opportunity to open her own law practice. She abruptly had to retire in 1972 due to illness.

She died in her hometown on December 1, 1986.

== See also ==
- List of first women lawyers and judges in Wisconsin
