= Pamela Pepper =

American judge (born 1964)

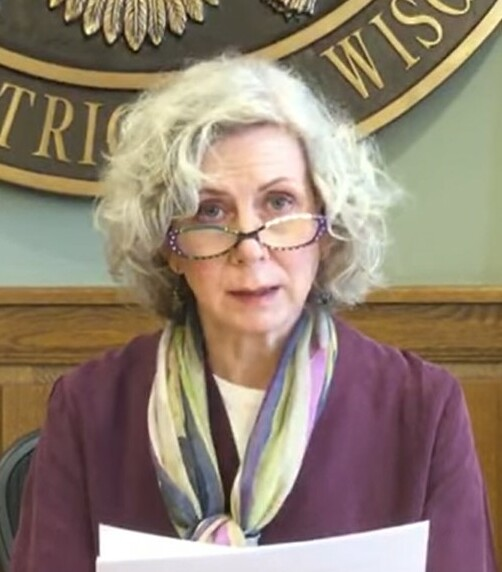
- Pepper in 2020

Chief Judge of the United States District Court for the Eastern District of Wisconsin
- Incumbent
- Assumed office November 1, 2019
- Preceded by: William C. Griesbach

Judge of the United States District Court for the Eastern District of Wisconsin
- Incumbent
- Assumed office December 8, 2014
- Appointed by: Barack Obama
- Preceded by: Charles N. Clevert Jr.

Personal details
- Born: 1964 (age 61–62) New Orleans, Louisiana, U.S.
- Education: Northwestern University (BS); Cornell University (JD)

Pamela Pepper (born 1964) is an American lawyer serving as the chief United States district judge of the United States District Court for the Eastern District of Wisconsin and former chief United States bankruptcy judge of the same court.

== Education ==
A 1982 graduate of Leland High School, Pepper was among the first racially integrated group of students to matriculate through the city’s public schools from K–12. She is one of the graduates featured in The Harvest: Integrating Mississippi's Schools, a documentary film produced by Sam Pollard and classmate Douglas A. Blackmon which first aired on American Experience on September 11, 2023.

Pepper received a Bachelor of Science degree in 1986 from Northwestern University. She received a Juris Doctor in 1989 from Cornell Law School.

== Career ==
She began her legal career as a law clerk for Judge Frank Minis Johnson of the United States Court of Appeals for the Eleventh Circuit from 1989 to 1990. She served as an assistant United States attorney in the Northern District of Illinois from 1990 to 1994 and in the Eastern District of Wisconsin from 1994 to 1997. From 1997 to 2005, she worked in private practice as a criminal defense attorney, where she handled both trials and appeals in state and federal courts. From 2005 to 2009, Pepper concurrently served as a bankruptcy judge in the Eastern District of Wisconsin and Southern District of Illinois. From 2009 to 2014 she served solely in the Eastern District of Wisconsin and from 2010 to 2014 she served as chief United States bankruptcy judge.

=== Federal judicial service ===
In 2014, Pepper was one of three finalists recommended to President Barack Obama by the bipartisan Wisconsin Federal Nominating Commission to fill a vacancy on the federal District Court for the Eastern District of Wisconsin. The other finalists were attorney Beth Kushner and state-court judge William Pocan.

On May 1, 2014, Obama nominated Pepper to the seat, which was vacated by Judge Charles N. Clevert Jr., who assumed senior status on October 31, 2012. She received a hearing on her nomination in the Senate Judiciary Committee on June 24, 2014. On July 17, 2014, her nomination was reported out of committee by a voice vote. On November 18, 2014, Senate Majority Leader Harry Reid filed a cloture motion on her nomination. On November 19, 2014, the United States Senate invoked cloture on her nomination by a 58–39 vote. On November 20, 2014, her nomination was confirmed by a 95–0 vote. She received her commission on December 8, 2014. She became chief judge on November 1, 2019.

Legal offices
Preceded by Charles N. Clevert Jr.	Judge of the United States District Court for the Eastern District of Wisconsin; 2014–present	Incumbent
Preceded by William C. Griesbach	Chief Judge of the United States District Court for the Eastern District of Wisconsin; 2019–present	Incumbent
