= Dorothy Walker (lawyer) =

First female district attorney in Wisconsin

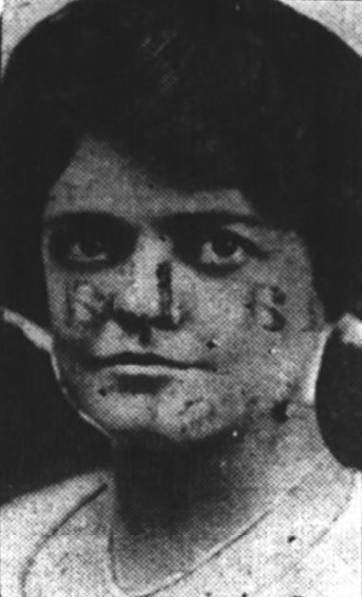
Walker circa 1926

Dorothy Walker (March 21, 1899 – August 1, 1983) was an American lawyer who served as the first female district attorney in Wisconsin.

Walker was born on March 21, 1899, in Columbus, Wisconsin. In 1921, she was the only female to graduate in her class from the University of Wisconsin Law School. Upon being admitted to practice law in Wisconsin in February 1922, Walker thereafter worked as a partner for a law firm until being elected District Attorney of Columbia County. By 1938, after serving two terms as district attorney, Walker opened her own private practice. In 1974, she was the first female to receive the Distinguished Alumni Faculty Award from the UW Law School Alumni Association. She died on August 1, 1983, at her law office in her hometown.

== See also ==
- List of first women lawyers and judges in Wisconsin
