= James Graham Jenkins =

American judge (1834–1921)

The Honorable James Graham Jenkins
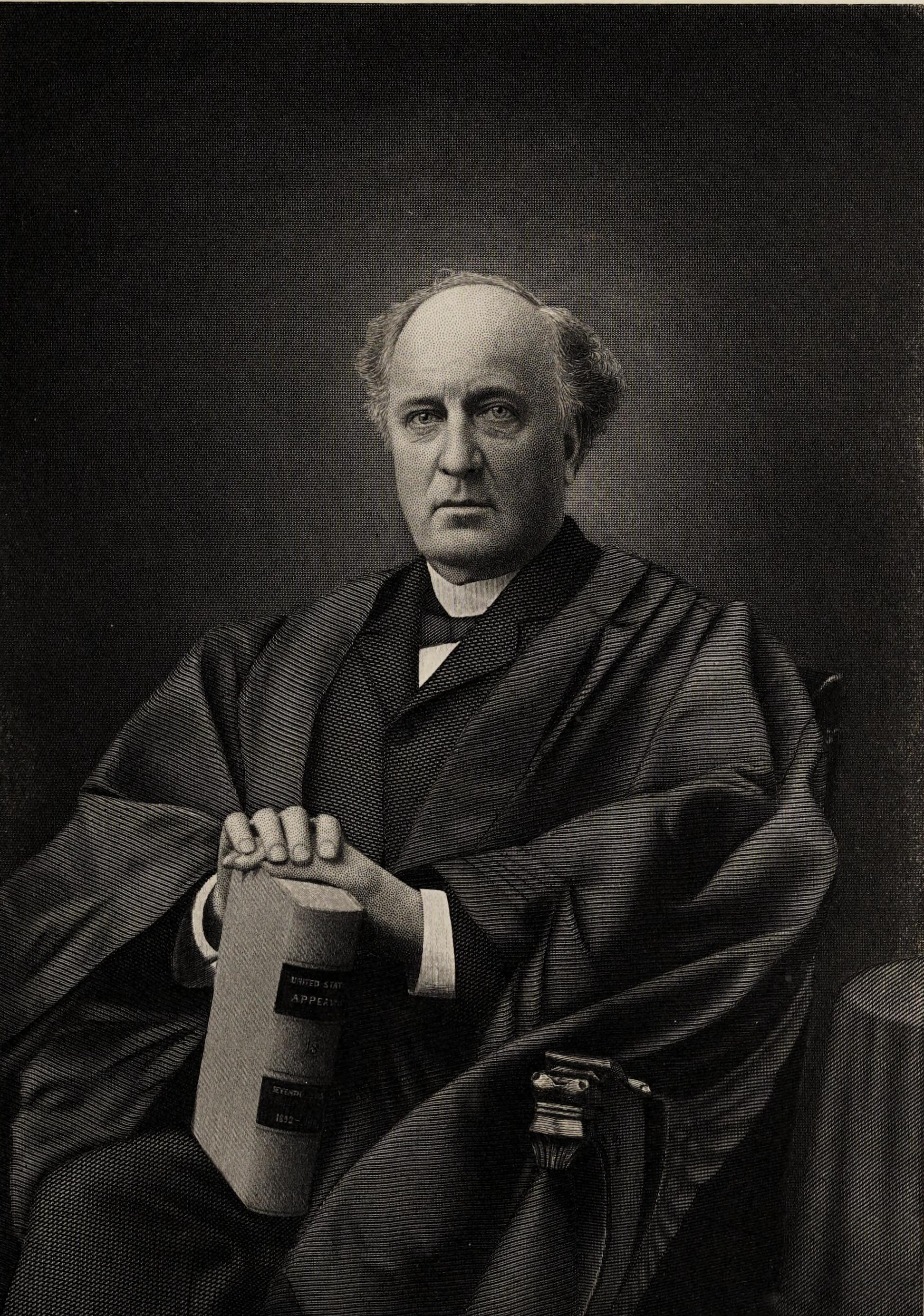

Judge of the United States Court of Appeals for the Seventh Circuit
- In office March 23, 1893 – February 23, 1905
- Appointed by: Grover Cleveland
- Preceded by: Walter Q. Gresham
- Succeeded by: William Henry Seaman

United States District Judge for the Eastern District of Wisconsin
- In office July 2, 1888 – March 23, 1893
- Appointed by: Grover Cleveland
- Preceded by: Charles E. Dyer
- Succeeded by: William Henry Seaman

Personal details
- Born: James Graham Jenkins; July 18, 1834 Saratoga Springs, New York
- Died: August 6, 1921 (aged 87) Milwaukee, Wisconsin
- Resting place: Forest Home Cemetery; Milwaukee, Wisconsin
- Party: Democratic
- Education: read law
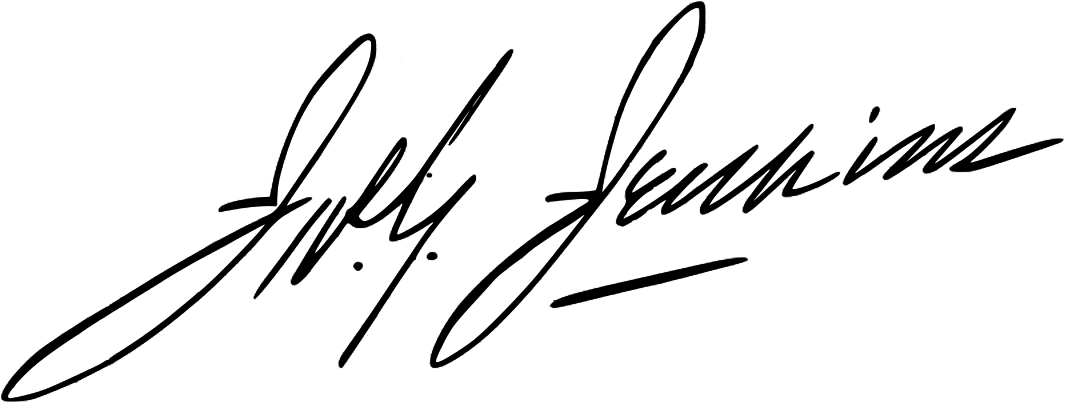
- Signature

James Graham Jenkins (July 18, 1834 – August 6, 1921) was an American lawyer and Judge. He served twelve years as a judge of the United States Court of Appeals for the Seventh Circuit, appointed by President Grover Cleveland. Prior to that, he had been a United States district judge for the Eastern District of Wisconsin.

== Education and career ==
Born on July 18, 1834, in Saratoga Springs, New York, Jenkins read law in 1855. He entered private practice in New York City from 1855 to 1857. He continued private practice in Milwaukee, Wisconsin, from 1857 to 1888. He was city attorney of Milwaukee from 1863 to 1867. In 1879, he was the Democratic nominee for Governor of Wisconsin, but was defeated by incumbent William E. Smith.

== Federal judicial service ==
Jenkins was nominated by President Grover Cleveland on June 19, 1888, to a seat on the United States District Court for the Eastern District of Wisconsin vacated by Judge Charles E. Dyer. He was confirmed by the United States Senate on July 2, 1888, and received his commission the same day. His service terminated on March 23, 1893, due to his elevation to the Seventh Circuit.

Jenkins was nominated by President Cleveland on March 20, 1893, to a joint seat on the United States Court of Appeals for the Seventh Circuit and the United States Circuit Courts for the Seventh Circuit vacated by Judge Walter Q. Gresham. He was confirmed by the Senate on March 23, 1893, and received his commission the same day. His service terminated on February 23, 1905, due to his retirement.

== Later career and death ==
Following his retirement from the federal bench, Jenkins resumed private practice in Milwaukee from 1905 to 1908. He was Dean of Marquette University Law School from 1908 to 1913. He died on August 6, 1921, in Milwaukee.

== Electoral history ==
Wisconsin gubernatorial election, 1879
| Party | Candidate | Votes | % | ±% |
|---|---|---|---|---|
General Election, November 4, 1879
| Republican | William E. Smith (incumbent) | 100,535 | 53.19% | +8.98% |
| Democratic | James Graham Jenkins | 75,030 | 39.70% | +0.13% |
| Greenback | Reuben May | 12,996 | 6.88% | −7.84% |
| | Scattering | 444 | 0.23% | |
| Total votes | | '189,005' | '100.0%' | +6.11% |
| Republican hold | | | | |

== Sources ==
Party political offices
| Preceded by James A. Mallory | Democratic nominee for Governor of Wisconsin; 1879 | Succeeded by Nicholas D. Fratt |
Legal offices
| Preceded by Charles E. Dyer | United States district judge for the Eastern District of Wisconsin; 1888 – 1893 | Succeeded by William Henry Seaman |
| Preceded by Walter Q. Gresham | Judge of the United States Court of Appeals for the Seventh Circuit; 1893 – 1905 | Succeeded by William Henry Seaman |
