= Evan Alfred Evans =

American judge (1876–1948)

Judge of the United States Court of Appeals for the Seventh Circuit
- In office May 10, 1916 – July 7, 1948
- Appointed by: Woodrow Wilson
- Preceded by: William Henry Seaman
- Succeeded by: F. Ryan Duffy

Personal details
- Born: Evan Alfred Evans; March 19, 1876 Spring Green, Wisconsin
- Died: July 7, 1948 (aged 72)
- Education: University of Wisconsin–Madison (BA); University of Wisconsin Law School (LLB)

Evan Alfred Evans (March 19, 1876 – July 7, 1948) was a United States circuit judge of the United States Court of Appeals for the Seventh Circuit.

== Education and career ==
Born in Spring Green, Wisconsin, Evans received a Bachelor of Arts degree from the University of Wisconsin–Madison in 1897 and a Bachelor of Laws from the University of Wisconsin Law School in 1899. He then practiced law in Baraboo, Wisconsin from 1900 to 1916.

== Federal judicial service ==
Evans was nominated by President Woodrow Wilson on May 1, 1916, to a seat on the United States Court of Appeals for the Seventh Circuit vacated by Judge William Henry Seaman. He was confirmed by the United States Senate on May 10, 1916, and received his commission the same day. He was a member of the Conference of Senior Circuit Judges (now the Judicial Conference of the United States) from 1935 to 1947. His service terminated on July 7, 1948, due to his death. He was the last appeals court judge in active service appointed to his position by President Wilson. (Note: At the time of Judge Evans' passing, four judges appointed by Wilson to district courts – Augustus Noble Hand, Joseph William Woodrough, Joseph Chappell Hutcheson Jr. and Samuel Hale Sibley – remained in active service as appellate judges by appointment of later presidents. Judges Woodrough and Hutcheson would remain in active service until 1961 and 1964 respectively.)

== See also ==
- List of United States federal judges by longevity of service

== Sources ==
Legal offices
| Preceded by William Henry Seaman | Judge of the United States Court of Appeals for the Seventh Circuit; 1916–1948 | Succeeded by F. Ryan Duffy |
