= Mark Pocan =

American politician (born 1964)

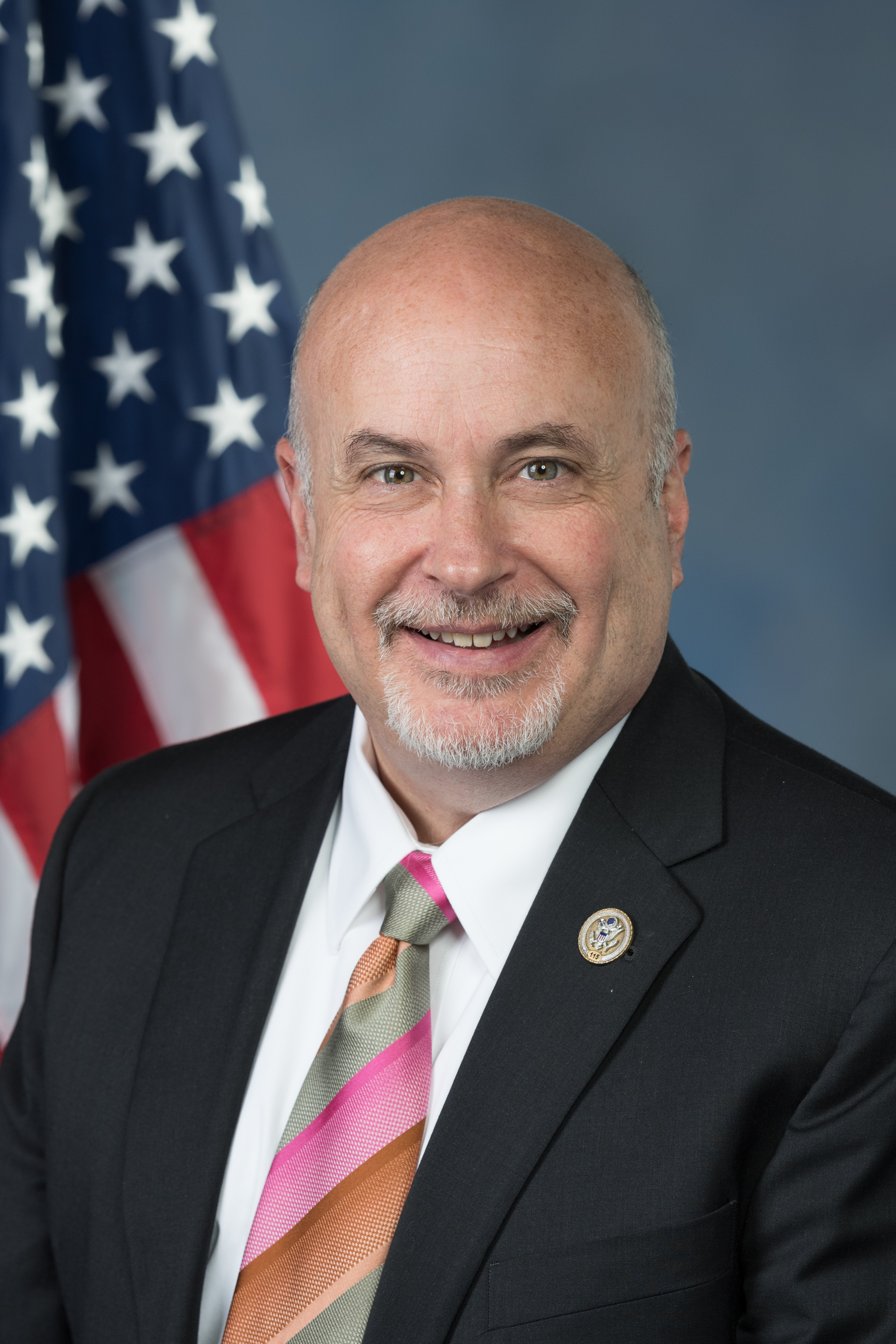
- Official portrait, 2017

Chair of the Congressional Progressive Caucus
- In office May 23, 2017 – January 3, 2021 Serving with Pramila Jayapal
- Preceded by: Keith Ellison
- Succeeded by: Pramila Jayapal

Member of the U.S. House of Representatives from Wisconsin's 2nd district
- Incumbent
- Assumed office January 3, 2013
- Preceded by: Tammy Baldwin

Member of the Wisconsin State Assembly from the 78th district
- In office January 3, 1999 – January 3, 2013
- Preceded by: Tammy Baldwin
- Succeeded by: Brett Hulsey

Personal details
- Born: Mark William Pocan; August 14, 1964 (age 62) Kenosha, Wisconsin, U.S.
- Party: Democratic
- Spouse: Philip Frank (m. 2006)
- Relatives: William Pocan (brother)
- Education: University of Wisconsin, Madison (BA)
- Website: House website Campaign website
- Pocan's voice Pocan supporting the Respect for Marriage Act. Recorded December 8, 2022

Mark William Pocan (/ˈpoʊkæn/ POH-kan; born August 14, 1964) is an American politician and businessman serving as the U.S. representative from Wisconsin's 2nd congressional district since 2013. The district is based in the state capital, Madison. A member of the Democratic Party, Pocan is co-chair of the Congressional Equality Caucus and chair emeritus of the Congressional Progressive Caucus.

From 1999 to 2013, Pocan represented Wisconsin's 78th Assembly district in the Wisconsin State Assembly. He succeeded Tammy Baldwin in the Assembly and later succeeded her in the U.S. House of Representatives after Baldwin was elected to the U.S. Senate.

== Early life and education ==
Pocan was born and raised in Kenosha, Wisconsin. He graduated from Harvey Elementary School, Washington Junior High School, and Mary D. Bradford High School in 1982, where he was elected senior class president. He attended the University of Wisconsin–Madison, earning a bachelor's degree in journalism in 1986.

== Early career ==
Shortly after graduating, Pocan opened up his own small business, a printing company named Budget Signs & Specialties, which he continues to own and run as of 2012. He is a member of the AFL-CIO, which he joined as a small business owner.

Pocan's active years at UW–Madison in College Democrats led to his election in 1991 to the Dane County Board of Supervisors, where he served Madison's downtown community for three terms, leaving the board in 1996.

== Wisconsin Assembly (1999–2013) ==
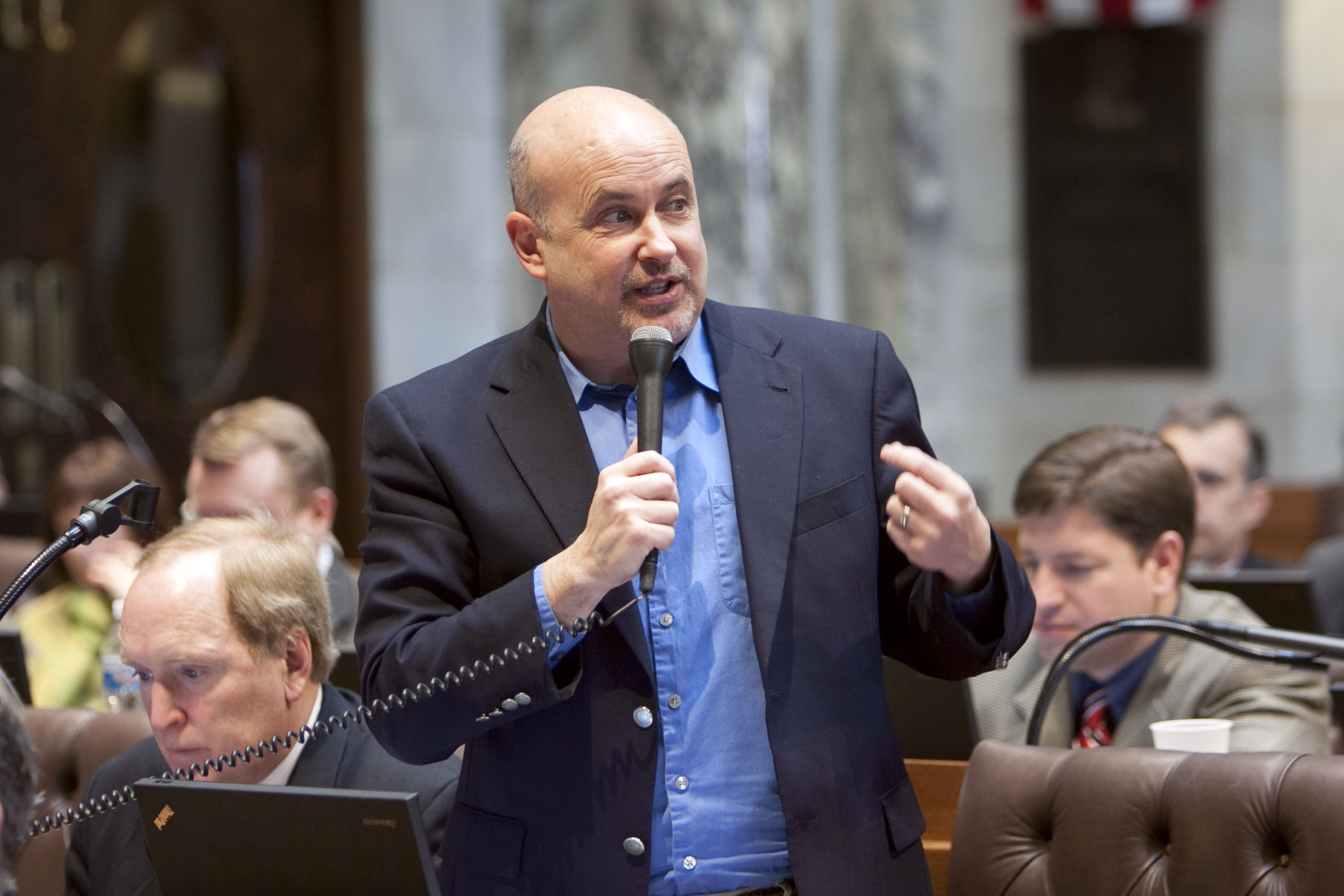
Pocan speaking on the Assembly floor in 2009

=== Elections ===
In 1998 Pocan's longtime friend and ally, Tammy Baldwin, gave up her seat in the Wisconsin State Assembly to make a successful run for Congress. Pocan ran to succeed her in the western Madison district and won a three-way Democratic primary with 54% of the vote. He faced no Republican opponent in the general election and won with 93% of the vote against an independent. He won reelection in 2000 with 81%—the only time he faced a Republican challenger. He was unopposed for reelection from 2002 to 2010.

=== Tenure ===
As a state legislator, Pocan earned a reputation for moving the Wisconsin political debate to the left. One of the most outspoken progressive members of the state assembly, he focused on issues including corrections reform, the state budget, education funding, and fighting privatization schemes.

For six years, Pocan sat on the Joint Finance Committee, including a term as co-chair. He also took on a leading role among Assembly Democrats, running caucus campaign efforts in 2008 when Democrats went from five seats down to retaking the majority for the first time in 14 years.

Pocan is one of the few progressive Democrats to have joined the American Legislative Exchange Council (ALEC), a conservative-leaning organization that produces model legislative proposals. He used his membership to investigate the organization's agenda and sponsors and wrote a series of articles on his experiences with ALEC for the Madison-based magazine The Progressive from 2008 to 2011. On the September 29, 2012, edition of Moyers and Company, Pocan said, "ALEC is a corporate dating service for lonely legislators and corporate special interests that eventually the relationship culminates with some special-interest legislation and hopefully that lives happily ever after as the ALEC model. Unfortunately what's excluded from that equation is the public."

=== Committee assignments ===
- Committee on Urban and Local Affairs
- Committee on Colleges and Universities
- Joint Survey Committee on Retirement Systems
- Joint Finance Committee

== U.S. House of Representatives (2013–present) ==
=== Elections ===
In 2012, Baldwin gave up her congressional seat in order to run for the U.S. Senate and Pocan decided to run in the open 2nd congressional district. He won a four-candidate Democratic primary with 72% of the vote. He won all 7 counties in the district, including the heavily populated Dane County with 74% of the vote. The 2nd district is extremely Democratic, and it was widely believed that Pocan would win the general election as its nominee. On November 6, 2012, Pocan won the general election, defeating Republican Chad Lee 68%–32%.

=== Tenure ===
In January 2020, Pocan endorsed Senator Bernie Sanders for president. On July 19, 2024, he called for Joe Biden to withdraw from the 2024 United States presidential election.

In July 2024, in protest of the Gaza–Israel conflict, Pocan chose not to attend Israeli prime minister Benjamin Netanyahu's address to Congress. On March 4, 2025, he walked out of President Trump's address to Congress while Trump was speaking.

On June 25, 2025, Pocan posted a comment on X telling White House deputy chief of staff Stephen Miller, who is Jewish, to "go back to 1930's Germany". The White House condemned the post as antisemitic, but Pocan did not apologize, claiming he would refuse to engage with what he called the "racist base of the GOP" and saying that "normal people" understood he was comparing Miller's views to those of the Nazis.

=== Committee assignments ===
- Committee on Appropriations
  - Subcommittee on Agriculture, Rural Development, Food and Drug Administration and Related Agencies
  - Subcommittee on Financial Services and General Government
  - Subcommittee on Labor, Health and Human Services, Education, and Related Agencies
- Committee on Education and Labor
  - Subcommittee on Higher Education and Workforce Investment
- Committee on Foreign Affairs

=== Caucus memberships ===
- Black Maternal Health Caucus
- Congressional Arts Caucus
- Congressional Progressive Caucus
- Congressional LGBT Equality Caucus (Co-chair)
- Veterinary Medicine Caucus
- Congressional Animal Protection Caucus
- Defense Spending Reduction Caucus
- Medicare for All Caucus
- Blue Collar Caucus
- Congressional Freethought Caucus
- Congressional Caucus for the Equal Rights Amendment
- Paper and Packaging Caucus
- Congressional Coalition on Adoption
- Problem Solvers Caucus (former member)

== Political positions ==
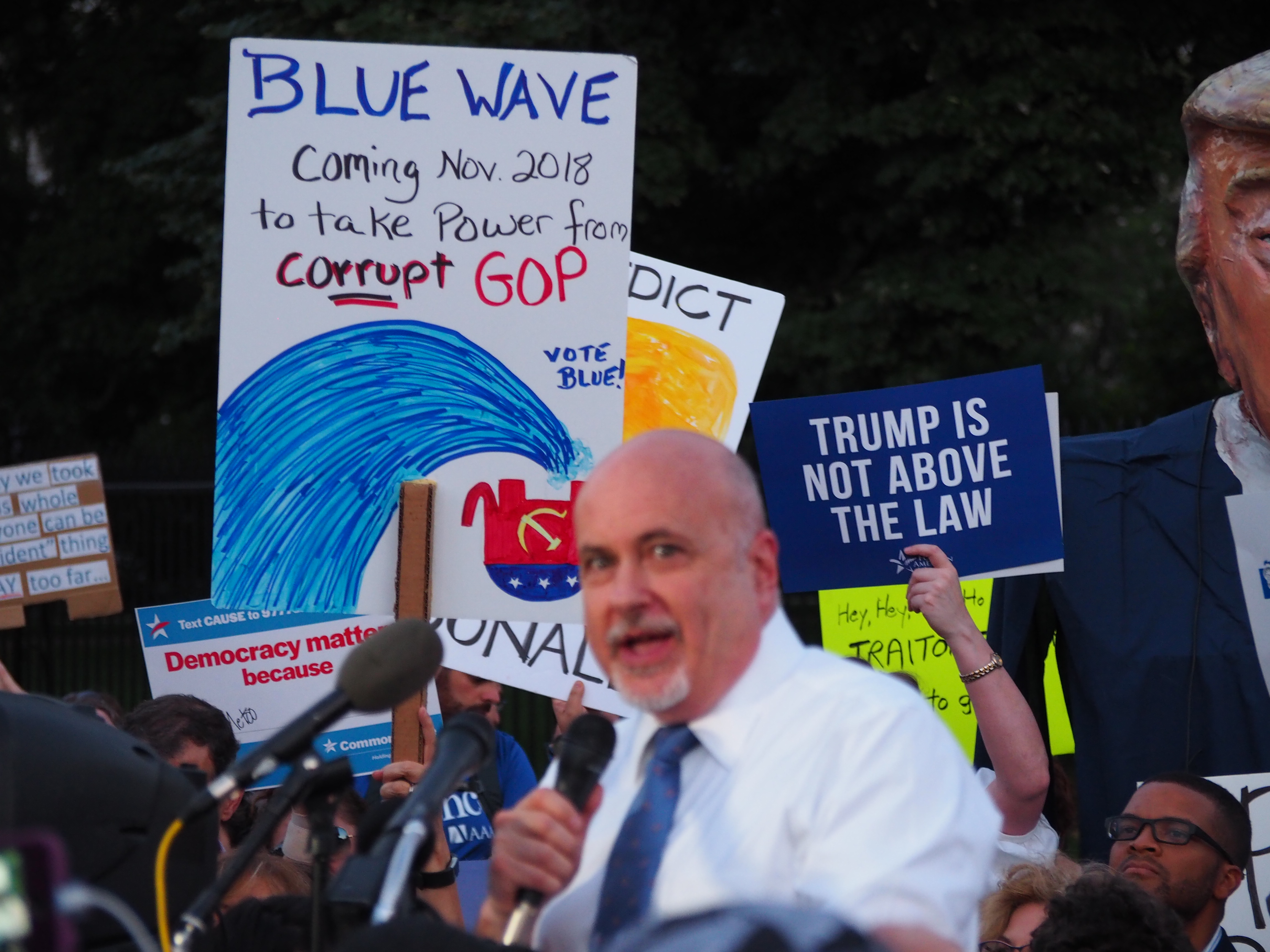
Pocan in July 2018

Pocan identifies as a progressive Democrat. He is a member of organizations including Wisconsin Citizens Action, the American Civil Liberties Union, Fair Wisconsin and Midwest Progressive Elected Officials Network.

=== Budget ===
Pocan supports decreasing U.S. military spending. Pocan, Pramila Jayapal, and Barbara Lee attempted to reduce the size of the $740 billion National Defense Authorization Act for Fiscal Year 2021, but their motion was rejected 93–324. Jayapal and Pocan, the Congressional Progressive Caucus's co-chairs, said, "Every handout to Lockheed Martin or Northrop Grumman is money that could have been spent on ending the [COVID-19] pandemic, keeping small businesses afloat and staving off an economic meltdown."

=== Economy ===
Pocan has called himself an opponent of "corporate power" and corporations "that get too big". In March 2021, he criticized Amazon for its treatment of workers, including behavior he described as union busting and "mak[ing] workers urinate in water bottles". The company denied that delivery drivers were sometimes forced to urinate in bottles, but later recanted the statement and apologized to Pocan.

In 2022, Pocan authored legislation to impose a moratorium on mergers and acquisitions in the food and agricultural sector. He supports reforms to federal agricultural commodity checkoff programs, including requiring that the programs publish budgets, be audited, and not contract with lobbyists or engage in anti-competitive practices.

=== Foreign policy ===
In September 2018, Pocan supported legislation invoking the War Powers Resolution of 1973 to stop U.S. involvement in the Saudi-led intervention in Yemen, saying, "The world's worst humanitarian crisis has been triggered by our secretive, illegal war in Yemen waged alongside the Saudi regime. As the Saudis use famine as a weapon of war, starving millions of innocent Yemenis to near death, the United States fuels, coordinates and provides bombs for Saudi airstrikes, and secretly deploys the military to participate in on-the-ground operations with Saudi troops."

In April 2019, after the House passed the resolution withdrawing American support for the Saudi-led coalition in Yemen, Pocan was one of nine lawmakers to sign a letter to President Trump requesting a meeting with him and urging him to sign "Senate Joint Resolution 7, which invokes the War Powers Act of 1973 to end unauthorized US military participation in the Saudi-led coalition's armed conflict against Yemen's Houthi forces, initiated in 2015 by the Obama administration." They wrote that the "Saudi-led coalition's imposition of an air-land-and-sea blockade as part of its war against Yemen's Houthis has continued to prevent the unimpeded distribution of these vital commodities, contributing to the suffering and death of vast numbers of civilians throughout the country" and that Trump's signing the resolution would give a "powerful signal to the Saudi-led coalition to bring the four-year-old war to a close."

In July 2019, Pocan voted against a House resolution introduced by Representative Brad Schneider opposing the Global Boycott, Divestment, and Sanctions Movement targeting Israel. The resolution passed by a vote of 398–17. In May 2021, Pocan and representatives Rashida Tlaib and Alexandria Ocasio-Cortez drafted a resolution to block the sale of precision-guided weapons to Israel after the Biden administration approved the sale. After the April 2024 drone strikes on aid workers from World Central Kitchen, Pocan, James McGovern, Jan Schakowsky, Nancy Pelosi, and 36 other Democratic members of Congress wrote President Joe Biden an open letter urging him to reconsider planned arms shipments to the Israeli military.

In 2023, Pocan was among 56 Democrats to vote in favor of H.Con.Res. 21, which directed President Biden to remove U.S. troops from Syria within 180 days.

In July 2026, Pocan, alongside Teresa Leger Fernández, Maxine Dexter, and Delia Ramirez, visited Cuba and met with president Miguel Díaz-Canel and other ministers. He called the US energy embargo on Cuba a "silent Gaza".

=== Immigration ===
In June 2018, Pocan announced that he would introduce legislation to dismantle U.S. Immigration and Customs Enforcement and establish a commission to determine how the government "can implement a humane immigration enforcement system" after visiting the Mexico–United States border and witnessing "the nation's immigration crisis". Representatives Pramila Jayapal and Adriano Espaillat joined Pocan in introducing the Establishing a Humane Immigration Enforcement System Act in July 2018.

=== Trump administration ===
On December 18, 2019, Pocan voted for both articles of impeachment against President Donald Trump.

On February 5, 2025, Pocan introduced the Eliminating Looting of Our Nation by Mitigating Unethical State Kleptocracy (ELON MUSK) Act, which seeks to ban special government employees—especially Elon Musk—from obtaining federal contracts.

== Personal life ==
Pocan is openly gay. He credits his political activism in part to an incident soon after he graduated from college and opened his printing business, when two men followed him after he left a gay bar and beat him with a baseball bat while they called him "faggot" and other anti-gay slurs. This spurred him to become active in Madison's LGBT community. Pocan was the only openly gay member of the state assembly after Tammy Baldwin's election to Congress, and one of three LGBT members of the 100th Wisconsin Legislature, alongside Senator Tim Carpenter and Representative JoCasta Zamarripa.

On November 24, 2006, Pocan and his long-term partner, Philip Frank, were legally married in Toronto. Pocan's brother, William S. Pocan, serves as a circuit court judge in Milwaukee County. Pocan is among the few U.S. representatives not to identify with any religion.

== Awards and honors ==
Pocan has received the following recognitions while in office:

- Fair Wisconsin Statewide Leader Award (2009)
- Planned Parenthood Rebecca Young Leadership Award (2009)
- Professional Firefighters of Wisconsin Legislator of the Year (2008)
- Wisconsin Library Association's Public Policy Award (2008)
- Wisconsin Coalition Against Sexual Assault Voices of Courage Public Policy Award (2008)
- Wisconsin League of Conservation Voters Honor Roll (2008)
- Wisconsin Aids Fund award (2007)
- Wisconsin League of Conservation Voters Conservation Champion (2006)
- Wisconsin Counties Association Outstanding Legislator Award (2006 & 2008)
- Clean Wisconsin Clean 16 Award (2004, 2002 & 2000)
- ACLU Special Recognition Award (2001)
- Wisconsin Federation of Teachers State Employees Council Representative of the Year (2003 & 2002)
- Outreach Man of the Year (1999)

== Electoral history ==
=== U.S. House of Representatives (2012–present) ===
Year	Election	Date	Elected				Defeated				Total	Plurality
2012	Primary	Aug. 14	Mark Pocan	Democratic	43,171	72.16%	Kelda Roys	Dem.	13,081	21.87%	59,826	30,090
2012	Primary	Aug. 14	Mark Pocan	Democratic	43,171	72.16%	Matt Silverman	Dem.	2,365	3.95%	59,826	30,090
2012	Primary	Aug. 14	Mark Pocan	Democratic	43,171	72.16%	Dennis Hall	Dem.	1,163	1.94%	59,826	30,090
2012	General	Nov. 6	Mark Pocan	Democratic	265,422	67.90%	Chad Lee	Rep.	124,683	31.90%	390,898	140,739
2012	General	Nov. 6	Mark Pocan	Democratic	265,422	67.90%	Joe Kopsick (write-in)	Ind.	6	0.00%	390,898	140,739
2014	General	Nov. 4	Mark Pocan (inc)	Democratic	224,920	68.40%	Peter Theron	Rep.	103,619	31.51%	328,847	121,301
2016	General	Nov. 8	Mark Pocan (inc)	Democratic	273,537	68.72%	Peter Theron	Rep.	124,044	31.16%	398,060	149,493
2018	General	Nov. 6	Mark Pocan (inc)	Democratic	309,116	97.42%	Joey Wayne Reed (write-in)	Rep.	29	0.01%	317,295	300,975
2018	General	Nov. 6	Mark Pocan (inc)	Democratic	309,116	97.42%	Rick Cruz (write-in)	Ind.	8	0.00%	317,295	300,975
2018	General	Nov. 6	Mark Pocan (inc)	Democratic	309,116	97.42%	Bradley Jason Burt (write-in)	Dem.	1	0.00%	317,295	300,975
2020	General	Nov. 3	Mark Pocan (inc)	Democratic	318,523	69.67%	Peter Theron	Rep.	138,306	30.25%	457,205	180,217
2022	General	Nov 8	Mark Pocan (inc)	Democratic	268,740	70.99%	Erik Olsen	Rep.	101,890	26.92%	378,537	109,797
2022	General	Nov 8	Mark Pocan (inc)	Democratic	268,740	70.99%	Douglas Alexander	Ind.	7,689	2.03%	378,537	109,797
2024	General	Nov 5	Mark Pocan (inc)	Democratic	320,317	70.05%	Erik Olsen	Rep.	136,357	29.82%	457,257	136,940

== See also ==
- List of LGBT members of the United States Congress

U.S. House of Representatives
Preceded by Tammy Baldwin	Member of the U.S. House of Representatives from Wisconsin's 2nd congressional district 2013–present	Incumbent
Preceded by Keith Ellison	Chair of the Congressional Progressive Caucus; 2017–2021; Served alongside: Raúl Grijalva, Pramila Jayapal	Succeeded by Pramila Jayapal
Preceded by David Cicilline	Chair of the Congressional Equality Caucus; 2023–2025	Succeeded by Mark Takano
U.S. order of precedence (ceremonial)
Preceded by Scott Peters	United States representatives by seniority 111th	Succeeded by Raul Ruiz
