= Charles E. Dyer =

American lawyer and United States District Judge for the Eastern District of Wisconsin

The Honorable Charles E. Dyer
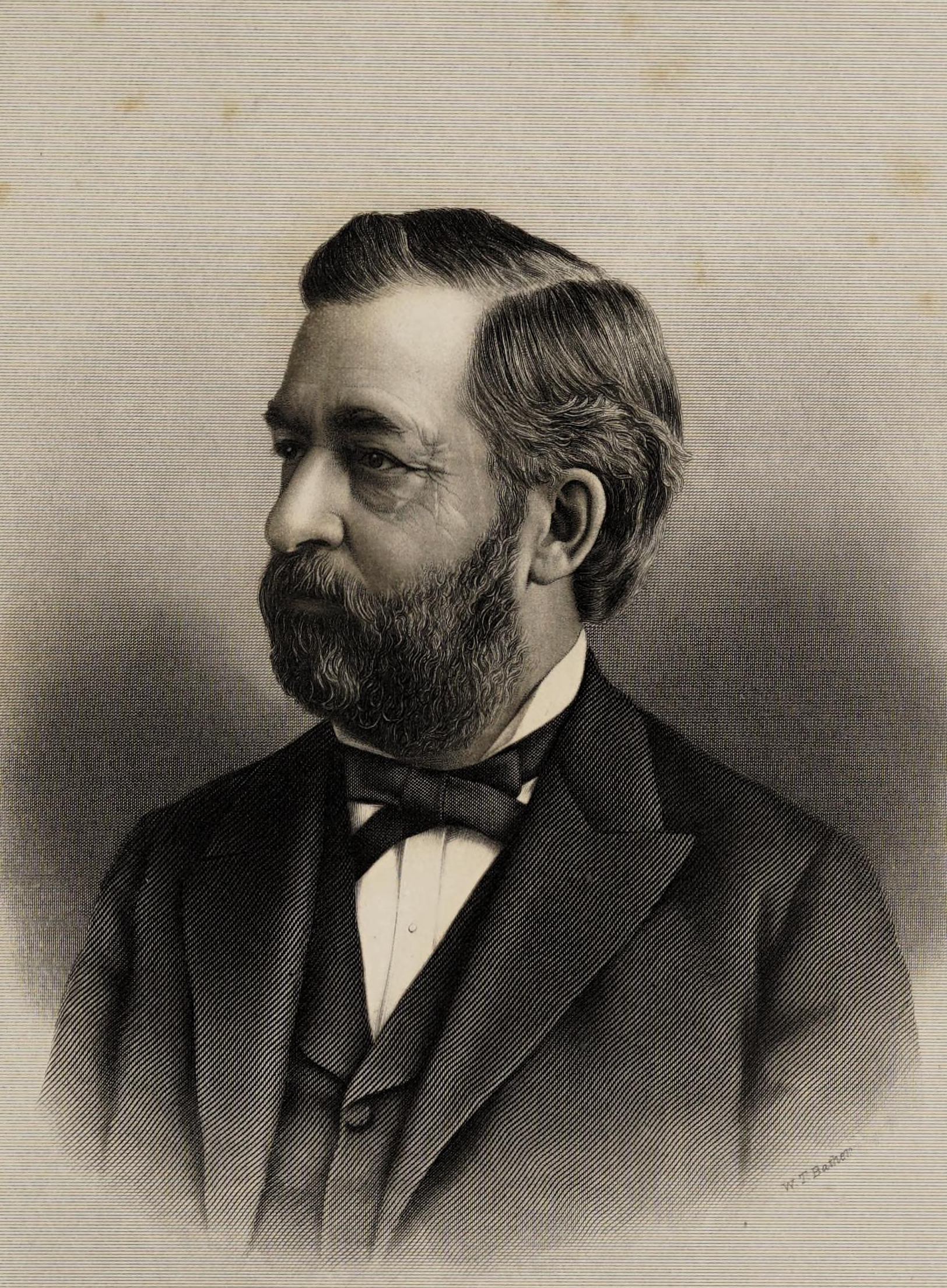

United States District Judge for the Eastern District of Wisconsin
- In office February 10, 1875 – May 18, 1888
- Appointed by: Ulysses S. Grant
- Preceded by: James Henry Howe
- Succeeded by: James Graham Jenkins

Member of the Wisconsin State Assembly from the Racine 1st district
- In office January 1, 1867 – January 1, 1869
- Preceded by: James O. Bartlett
- Succeeded by: Albert L. Phillips

Personal details
- Born: Charles Ephron Dyer; October 15, 1834 Cicero, New York
- Died: November 25, 1905 (aged 71) Milwaukee, Wisconsin
- Resting place: Mound Cemetery; Racine, Wisconsin
- Party: Republican
- Spouses: Sarah E. Root; (died 1927)
- Children: Joseph R. Dyer; (b. 1862; died 1934)
- Parents: Edward Galusha Dyer (father); Ann Eliza (Morse) Dyer (mother)
- Education: read law
- Profession: lawyer, judge

Charles E. Dyer (October 15, 1834 – November 25, 1905) was a United States district judge of the United States District Court for the Eastern District of Wisconsin.

== Education and career ==
Born in Cicero, New York, Dyer read law to enter the bar in 1857. He was in private practice in Sandusky, Ohio from 1857 to 1858, and in Racine, Wisconsin from 1859 to 1860, and from 1861 to 1867. He was city attorney of Racine from 1860 to 1861. He was a member of the Wisconsin State Assembly from 1867 to 1868, returning to private practice in Racine from 1868 to 1875.

== Federal judicial service ==
On February 10, 1875, Dyer was nominated by President Ulysses S. Grant to a seat on the United States District Court for the Eastern District of Wisconsin vacated by Judge James Henry Howe. Dyer was confirmed by the United States Senate on February 10, 1875, and received his commission the same day. Dyer served in that capacity until his resignation on May 18, 1888.

== Later career and damage ==
Dyer was thereafter in private practice in Milwaukee, Wisconsin, and general counsel to the Northwestern Mutual Life Insurance Company from 1888 until his death on November 25, 1905, in Milwaukee.

== Sources ==
Legal offices
| Preceded by James Henry Howe | United States District Judge for the Eastern District of Wisconsin; 1875 – 1888 | Succeeded by James Graham Jenkins |
