= Charles N. Clevert Jr. =

American judge (born 1947)

Senior Judge of the United States District Court for the Eastern District of Wisconsin
- In office October 31, 2012 – March 31, 2017

Chief Judge of the United States District Court for the Eastern District of Wisconsin
- In office 2009–2012
- Preceded by: Rudolph T. Randa
- Succeeded by: William C. Griesbach

Judge of the United States District Court for the Eastern District of Wisconsin
- In office July 29, 1996 – October 31, 2012
- Appointed by: Bill Clinton
- Preceded by: Terence T. Evans
- Succeeded by: Pamela Pepper

Personal details
- Born: Charles Nelson Clevert Jr. October 11, 1947 (age 79) Richmond, Virginia, U.S.
- Education: Davis & Elkins College (BA); Georgetown University (JD)

Charles Nelson Clevert Jr. (born October 11, 1947) is a former United States district judge of the United States District Court for the Eastern District of Wisconsin.

== Education and career ==
Born in Richmond, Virginia. Clevert received a Bachelor of Arts degree from Davis and Elkins College in 1969 and a Juris Doctor from Georgetown University Law Center in 1972. He was an assistant district attorney of Milwaukee County, Wisconsin from 1972 to 1975. He was an Assistant United States Attorney of the Eastern District of Wisconsin from 1975 to 1977, and was a Special Assistant United States Attorney for the Northern District of Illinois in 1977.

Clevert was a United States Bankruptcy Judge for the Eastern District of Wisconsin from 1977 to 1995, and was the Chief United States Bankruptcy Judge from 1986 to 1995. He was also a lecturer at the University of Wisconsin Law School from 1989 to 1990.

== Federal judicial service ==
On December 7, 1995, Clevert was nominated by President Bill Clinton to a seat on the United States District Court for the Eastern District of Wisconsin vacated by Terence T. Evans. Clevert was confirmed by the United States Senate on July 17, 1996, and received his commission on July 29, 1996. He was Chief Judge from September 1, 2009, to October 31, 2012. He took senior status on October 31, 2012. He retired from active service on March 31, 2017.

== See also ==
- List of African-American federal judges
- List of African-American jurists
- List of first minority male lawyers and judges in Wisconsin

Legal offices
Preceded by Terence T. Evans	Judge of the United States District Court for the Eastern District of Wisconsin; 1996–2012	Succeeded by Pamela Pepper
Preceded by Rudolph T. Randa	Chief Judge of the United States District Court for the Eastern District of Wisconsin; 2009–2012	Succeeded by William C. Griesbach
