= Rudolph T. Randa =

American judge (1940–2016)

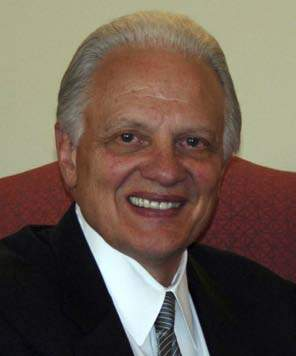

Senior Judge of the United States District Court for the Eastern District of Wisconsin
- In office February 5, 2016 – September 5, 2016

Chief Judge of the United States District Court for the Eastern District of Wisconsin
- In office 2002 – October 2009
- Preceded by: Joseph Peter Stadtmueller
- Succeeded by: Charles N. Clevert Jr.

Judge of the United States District Court for the Eastern District of Wisconsin
- In office August 12, 1992 – February 5, 2016
- Appointed by: George H. W. Bush
- Preceded by: Robert W. Warren
- Succeeded by: Brett H. Ludwig

Judge of the Wisconsin Court of Appeals District I
- In office 1981 – August 1, 1982
- Appointed by: Lee S. Dreyfus
- Preceded by: Robert C. Cannon
- Succeeded by: Ted E. Wedemeyer Jr.

Wisconsin Circuit Court Judge for the Milwaukee Circuit, Branch 10
- In office August 1982 – August 12, 1992
- Appointed by: Lee S. Dreyfus
- Preceded by: Ted E. Wedemeyer Jr.
- Succeeded by: Timothy Dugan

Wisconsin Circuit Court Judge for the Milwaukee Circuit, Branch 35
- In office August 1, 1979 – 1981
- Preceded by: Position Established
- Succeeded by: Lee E. Wells

Personal details
- Born: Rudolph Thomas Randa; July 25, 1940 Milwaukee, Wisconsin, U.S.
- Died: September 5, 2016 (aged 76) Milwaukee, Wisconsin, U.S.
- Cause of death: Brain Cancer
- Resting place: Holy Cross Cemetery and Mausoleum; Milwaukee, Wisconsin
- Education: University of Wisconsin–Milwaukee (BS); University of Wisconsin–Madison (JD)

Military service
- Allegiance: United States
- Branch/service: United States Army
- Years of service: 1967–1969
- Rank: Captain
- Battles/wars: Vietnam War
- Awards: Bronze Star; Vietnam Service Medal; National Defense Svc.; Vietnam Campaign

Rudolph Thomas Randa (July 25, 1940 – September 5, 2016) was an American lawyer who served as a United States district judge of the United States District Court for the Eastern District of Wisconsin from 1992 to 2016. He was chief judge of the Eastern District of Wisconsin from 2002 until October 2009. Prior to his appointment to the federal court, he was a judge of the Wisconsin Circuit Court and served one year on the Wisconsin Court of Appeals.

== Early life and education ==
Randa was born July 25, 1940, in Milwaukee, Wisconsin. He was a graduate of Milwaukee's Riverside University High School, with honors. He earned a Bachelor of Science degree from the University of Wisconsin–Milwaukee, receiving academic honors and graduating as a distinguished military graduate in 1963. Randa received his Juris Doctor from the University of Wisconsin Law School in 1966.

== Military service ==
From 1967 to 1969, Randa served in the United States Army as a Company Commander during the Vietnam War. Randa served with distinction, earning the Bronze Star Medal, the Vietnam Service Medal with 5 campaign stars, the National Defense Service Medal, and the Vietnam Campaign Medal. The first three were awarded by the United States Army and the last awarded by the Republic of Vietnam.

== Legal career ==
After Vietnam, Randa was appointed to the United States Attorney General's Office in Washington, D.C. In 1970, he returned to Milwaukee. From 1970 to 1973, Randa served as Assistant City Attorney for the City of Milwaukee. In 1973, he became the Principal City Attorney for Milwaukee. He represented the City of Milwaukee in two major civil rights cases filed by individual plaintiffs, the United States Department of Justice and the NAACP, alleging a pattern and practice of discrimination based on race and national origin in the Milwaukee fire and police departments. These suits resulted in consent decrees.

In 1975, Randa was elected Municipal Judge in Milwaukee. In 1979, he was elected Circuit Judge for Milwaukee County. He was appointed to the Wisconsin Court of Appeals in 1981. After he was defeated seeking election to a full term on the Court of Appeals, he was re-appointed Circuit Judge, and re-elected in 1983. He remained on the Circuit Court until 1992. He served tempus semestre on the 4th District Court of Appeals from 1983 to 1984 and from 1984 to 1985.

== Federal judicial service ==
Randa was nominated by President George H. W. Bush on April 9, 1992, to a seat on the United States District Court for the Eastern District of Wisconsin vacated by Judge Robert W. Warren; he was confirmed by the United States Senate by unanimous consent on August 11, 1992, and received commission on August 12, 1992. He served as Chief Judge from 2002 to 2009. In July 2007, Randa announced his intention to assume senior status upon the confirmation of a successor; however, confirmation of a successor did not occur by the end of President George W. Bush's presidency, and following the election of Barack Obama in the 2008 presidential election, Randa rescinded his decision to assume senior status, having apparently not wished to be succeeded by a Democratic president's appointee. Later, facing ill health, he assumed senior status on February 5, 2016. His service was terminated on September 5, 2016 due to his death.

== Significant rulings ==
In 1995, Randa ruled that the 1994 Freedom of Access to Clinic Entrances Act was unconstitutional in banning "nonviolent, physical obstruction of reproductive health services clinics". He ruled that Congress could not use its constitutional authority under the Commerce Clause to regulate abortion protests, "a private activity wholly intrastate in character, non-violent by description and definition, without any commercial aspect, the control of which historically and traditionally rested within the domain of local and state authorities, and which has no direct effect on interstate commerce but instead affects an activity found by Congress to be within 'the stream of interstate commerce ...'" His ruling was reversed by the Seventh Circuit Court of Appeals.

In 2001, Randa ruled that children in foster care have enforceable federal rights to a speedy adoption and can sue a state for failing to make them legally available for adoption as required under the Adoption and Safe Families Act of 1997 (ASFA). The ruling in Jeanine B v. McCallum was the first court ruling to fully examine the rights of children to sue under ASFA and whether those federal rights impose binding obligations on a state.

In 2009, in Flying J. v. Van Hollen, Randa ruled that Wisconsin's minimum markup of 9.18% on gasoline as required by the Unfair Sales Act was unconstitutional. Randa ruled that this provision creates an illegal restraint of trade in violation of the Sherman Antitrust Act, and that the illegal restraint was not actively supervised by the State. Randa enjoined the State from further enforcement of the law. The Wisconsin Attorney General at that time J.B. Van Hollen announced he would not appeal the decision. The Wisconsin Petroleum Marketers & Convenience Store Association ("WPMCA") moved to intervene post-judgment and to appeal Randa's ruling. In 2010 the 7th Circuit Court of Appeals overruled Randa's decision and found Wisconsin's Unfair Sales Act to be constitutional.

Also in 2009, Randa ordered that prison officials in Wisconsin's primary female correctional facility, Taycheedah Correctional Institution, make significant changes in the distribution and administration of medication to prisoners. Randa ordered the state to begin using licensed practical nurses or medical personnel with equivalent training to distribute and administer prescriptions, instead of using correctional officers. He also ordered that medication must be dispensed and administered in a timely, accurate, and reliable manner.

In 2010, Randa ruled that a bond indenture agreement executed by the Lake of the Torches Economic Development Corporation was void because it was a gaming facility management contract unapproved by the National Indian Gaming Commission. As a consequence, the waiver of the corporation's sovereign immunity in the indenture was also void, so Randa dismissed an action to enforce the indenture for lack of subject matter jurisdiction. On appeal, the Seventh Circuit agreed that the indenture was an unapproved management contract, but remanded for further proceedings to determine whether any collateral documents could support the waiver of sovereign immunity.

In 2014, Randa ordered that evidence collected by prosecutors in a campaign finance investigation regarding alleged unlawful "coordination" by advocacy groups opposing the 2012 recall election of Wisconsin Governor Scott Walker be destroyed and the probe be halted. One day later, a 7th Circuit Court of Appeals panel issued a stay of his ruling on procedural grounds, returning the case to Randa to determine whether the prosecutors' motions are frivolous.

On October 14, 2014, Randa issued a preliminary injunction, directing Milwaukee County District Attorney John T. Chisholm and the state Government Accountability Board to not enforce a controversial section of Wisconsin campaign finance law, which he ruled was in contravention of the First Amendment.

Eight days later, on October 22, Randa extended his temporary restraining order blocking enforcement of the law until November 12. He issued the original order on October 14 and it would have expired on October 28 without further action. Randa set oral arguments in the case for October 31, 2014. The lawsuit challenging the law was filed by Citizens for Responsible Government Advocates.

== Death ==
In December 2015, Randa was diagnosed with a cancerous brain tumor, known as an astrocytoma. He died on September 5, 2016, aged 76.

== Electoral history ==
=== Wisconsin Circuit Court (1979) ===
Wisconsin Circuit Court, Milwaukee Circuit, Branch 35 Election, 1979
Party	Candidate	Votes	%	±%
General Election, April 3, 1979
Nonpartisan	Rudolph T. Randa	54,409	56.33%	
Nonpartisan	Mark Gerrard Lipscomb Jr.	42,174	43.67%	
Total votes		'96,583'	'100.0%'	

=== Wisconsin Court of Appeals (1982) ===
Wisconsin Court of Appeals, District I Election, 1982
Party	Candidate	Votes	%	±%
General Election, April 6, 1982
Nonpartisan	Ted E. Wedemeyer Jr.	36,724	59.59%	
Nonpartisan	Rudolph T. Randa (incumbent)	24,903	40.41%	
Total votes		'61,627'	'100.0%'	-81.47%

=== Wisconsin Circuit Court (1983, 1989) ===
Wisconsin Circuit Court, Milwaukee Circuit, Branch 10 Election, 1983
Party	Candidate	Votes	%	±%
General Election, April 5, 1983
Nonpartisan	Rudolph T. Randa (incumbent)	56,211	100.0%	
Total votes		'56,211'	'100.0%'	

Wisconsin Circuit Court, Milwaukee Circuit, Branch 10 Election, 1989
Party	Candidate	Votes	%	±%
General Election, April 4, 1989
Nonpartisan	Rudolph T. Randa (incumbent)	95,678	100.0%	
Total votes		'95,678'	'100.0%'	+70.21%

Legal offices
Preceded by New branch	Wisconsin Circuit Court Judge for the Milwaukee Circuit, Branch 35; 1979 – 1981	Succeeded by Lee E. Wells
Preceded by Robert C. Cannon	Judge of the Wisconsin Court of Appeals District I 1981 – 1982	Succeeded by Ted E. Wedemeyer Jr.
Preceded by Ted E. Wedemeyer Jr.	Wisconsin Circuit Court Judge for the Milwaukee Circuit, Branch 10; 1982 – 1992	Succeeded by Timothy Dugan
Preceded by Robert W. Warren	Judge of the United States District Court for the Eastern District of Wisconsin; 1992 – 2016	Succeeded by Brett H. Ludwig
Preceded by Joseph Peter Stadtmueller	Chief Judge of the United States District Court for the Eastern District of Wisconsin; 2002 – 2009	Succeeded by Charles N. Clevert Jr.
