= Byron B. Conway =

American judge (born 1976)

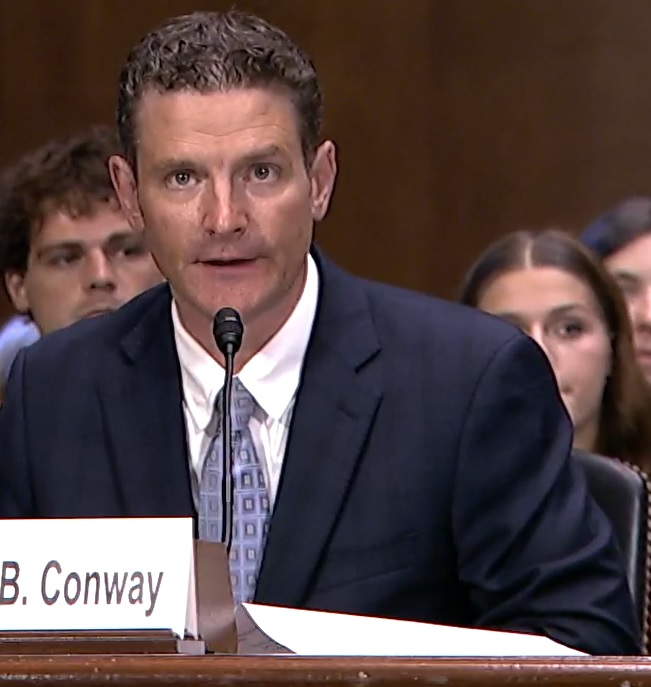

Judge of the United States District Court for the Eastern District of Wisconsin
- Incumbent
- Assumed office November 4, 2024
- Appointed by: Joe Biden
- Preceded by: William C. Griesbach

Personal details
- Born: Byron Browning Conway; 1976 (age 49–50) Green Bay, Wisconsin, U.S.
- Education: Santa Clara University (BA); University of Queensland (International Law Certificate); Marquette University (JD)

Byron Browning Conway (born 1976) is an American lawyer who is serving as a United States district judge of the United States District Court for the Eastern District of Wisconsin.

== Education ==
Conway received a Bachelor of Arts from Santa Clara University in 1998. He received an International Law Certificate from the University of Queensland in 2000. Conway received a Juris Doctor from Marquette University Law School in 2002.

== Career ==
From 2002 to 2006, Conway worked as an associate at the Milwaukee law firm Gimbel Reilly Guerin & Brown LLP. From 2006 to 2024, he was an attorney in the Green Bay office of the law firm Habush, Habush & Rottier S.C. and a shareholder at the firm from 2010 to 2024.

=== Federal judicial service ===
In June 2023, Conway and Brown County Circuit Court Judge Marc Aaron Hammer were recommended to the Biden administration by Senators Baldwin and Johnson to fill the vacancy on the U.S. District Court for Eastern Wisconsin. On July 3, 2024, President Joe Biden announced his intent to nominate Conway to serve as a United States district judge of the United States District Court for the Eastern District of Wisconsin. On July 8, 2024, his nomination was sent to the Senate. President Biden nominated Conway to the seat vacated by Judge William C. Griesbach, who assumed senior status on December 31, 2019. On July 31, 2024, a hearing on his nomination was held before the Senate Judiciary Committee. On September 19, 2024, his nomination was reported out of committee by a 13–8 vote. On September 25, 2024, the United States Senate invoked cloture on his nomination by a 58–37 vote. Later that day, his nomination was confirmed by a 58–37 vote. He received his judicial commission on November 4, 2024. He was sworn in on November 8, 2024.

Legal offices
Preceded by William C. Griesbach	Judge of the United States District Court for the Eastern District of Wisconsin; 2024–present	Incumbent
