= Joseph Peter Stadtmueller =

American judge (born 1942)

Chief Judge of the United States District Court for the Eastern District of Wisconsin
- In office 1995–2002
- Preceded by: Terence T. Evans
- Succeeded by: Rudolph T. Randa

Judge of the United States District Court for the Eastern District of Wisconsin
- Incumbent
- Assumed office June 1, 1987
- Appointed by: Ronald Reagan
- Preceded by: John W. Reynolds Jr.

United States Attorney for the Eastern District of Wisconsin
- In office 1981–1987
- Appointed by: Ronald Reagan
- Preceded by: Joan F. Kessler
- Succeeded by: Patricia J. Gorence

Personal details
- Born: January 28, 1942 (age 84) Oshkosh, Wisconsin, U.S.
- Education: Marquette University (BA, JD)

Joseph Peter Stadtmueller (born January 28, 1942) is an American lawyer and a United States district judge for the United States District Court for the Eastern District of Wisconsin since 1987. He was chief judge of the Eastern District of Wisconsin from 1995 to 2002.

== Education and career ==
Stadtmueller was born in Oshkosh, Wisconsin. He received a Bachelor of Arts degree from Marquette University in 1964 and a Juris Doctor from Marquette University Law School in 1967. He was in private practice in Milwaukee from 1968 to 1969. He was an Assistant United States Attorney of the Eastern District of Wisconsin from 1969 to 1974, and then first assistant for that district from 1974 to 1975. He returned to private practice from 1975 to 1976, but was again an Assistant United States Attorney from 1977 to 1978, then the Deputy United States Attorney from 1978 to 1981, finally becoming the United States Attorney for the Eastern District of Wisconsin from 1981 to 1987.

=== Federal judicial service ===
On March 3, 1987, Stadtmueller was nominated by President Ronald Reagan to a seat on the United States District Court for the Eastern District of Wisconsin vacated when Judge John W. Reynolds Jr., assumed senior status. Stadtmueller was confirmed by the United States Senate on May 19, 1987, and received his commission on June 1, 1987. He served as Chief Judge from 1995 to 2002.

== See also ==
- List of United States federal judges by longevity of service

== Sources ==
Legal offices
Preceded by Joan F. Kessler	United States Attorney for the Eastern District of Wisconsin; 1981–1987	Succeeded by Patricia J. Gorence
Preceded by John W. Reynolds Jr.	Judge of the United States District Court for the Eastern District of Wisconsin; 1987–present	Incumbent
Preceded by Terence T. Evans	Chief Judge of the United States District Court for the Eastern District of Wisconsin; 1995–2002	Succeeded by Rudolph T. Randa
