= Terence T. Evans =

American judge (1940–2011)

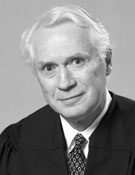

Senior Judge of the United States Court of Appeals for the Seventh Circuit
- In office January 7, 2010 – August 10, 2011

Judge of the United States Court of Appeals for the Seventh Circuit
- In office August 11, 1995 – January 7, 2010
- Appointed by: Bill Clinton
- Preceded by: Richard Dickson Cudahy
- Succeeded by: Michael B. Brennan

Chief Judge of the United States District Court for the Eastern District of Wisconsin
- In office 1991–1995
- Preceded by: Robert W. Warren
- Succeeded by: Joseph Peter Stadtmueller

Judge of the United States District Court for the Eastern District of Wisconsin
- In office November 2, 1979 – August 11, 1995
- Appointed by: Jimmy Carter
- Preceded by: Seat established by 92 Stat. 1629
- Succeeded by: Charles N. Clevert Jr.

Wisconsin Circuit Court Judge for the Milwaukee Circuit, Branch 22
- In office August 1, 1978 – November 2, 1979
- Preceded by: Transitioned from County Court
- Succeeded by: William J. Haese

County Judge of Milwaukee County, Branch 3
- In office January 7, 1974 – August 1, 1978
- Preceded by: Louis J. Ceci
- Succeeded by: Transitioned to Circuit Court

Personal details
- Born: Terence Thomas Evans; March 25, 1940 Milwaukee, Wisconsin, U.S.
- Died: August 10, 2011 (aged 71) Chicago, Illinois, U.S.
- Education: Marquette University (BA, JD)

Terence Thomas Evans (March 25, 1940 – August 10, 2011) was an American lawyer and jurist from Milwaukee, Wisconsin. He served more than 30 years as a United States federal judge, serving the last sixteen years of his life as a judge of the U.S. 7th Circuit Court of Appeals. Before that, he served sixteen years as a United States district judge in the Eastern District of Wisconsin, including four years as chief judge for that district (1991–1995). Before his appointment to the federal judiciary, he served five years as a county judge and Wisconsin circuit court judge in Milwaukee County.

== Early life, education, and career ==
Born in Milwaukee, Wisconsin, Evans received a Bachelor of Arts degree from Marquette University in 1962 and his Juris Doctor from Marquette University Law School in 1967. He was a law clerk to Wisconsin Supreme Court judge Horace W. Wilkie, from 1967 to 1968. He then served as an assistant district attorney for Milwaukee County, Wisconsin from 1968 to 1970, was in private practice from 1970 to 1974, and was a circuit court judge in Milwaukee from 1978 to 1980.

== Federal judicial service ==
On July 21, 1979, Evans was nominated by President Jimmy Carter to a new seat United States District Court for the Eastern District of Wisconsin created by 92 Stat. 1629. He was confirmed by the United States Senate on October 31, 1979, and received his commission on November 2, 1979. He served as Chief Judge from 1991 to 1995. His service terminated on August 11, 1995, due to his elevation to the Seventh Circuit.

On April 25, 1995, Evans was nominated by President Bill Clinton for elevation to a seat on the United States Court of Appeals for the Seventh Circuit vacated by Richard Dickson Cudahy. Evans was confirmed by the United States Senate on August 11, 1995, and received his commission the same day. On July 28, 2009, the Milwaukee Journal Sentinel reported that Evans has notified the President of his intention to assume senior status on January 7, 2010, on the "30-year anniversary of when he first took the federal bench." He assumed senior status in 2010, serving in that capacity until his death. Evans died suddenly on August 11, 2011, as a result of idiopathic pulmonary fibrosis and acute respiratory distress syndrome.

=== Pragmatism and humor ===
Evans' judicial philosophy was marked by pragmatism, an approach well-served at the appellate level by his previous experience as a trial judge. He is particularly known for his sense of humor, and his willingness and ability to weave lighthearted remarks into his judicial opinions. Perhaps the best known example of this was the judge's opinion in United States v. Murphy, in which the following footnote was included:

The trial transcript quotes Ms. Hayden as saying Murphy called her a snitch bitch "hoe." A "hoe," of course, is a tool used for weeding and gardening. We think the court reporter, unfamiliar with rap music (perhaps thankfully so), misunderstood Hayden's response. We have taken the liberty of changing "hoe" to "ho," a staple of rap music vernacular as, for example, when Ludacris raps "You doin' ho activities with ho tendencies."

Judge Richard Posner was also once the subject of Evans's wit, when he stated:

Football fans know the sickening feeling: your team scores a big touchdown but then a penalty flag is tossed, wiping out the play. Universal Bancard Systems, Inc. knows that feeling firsthand after seeing not one, but two big touchdowns called back. The referee who waved off the first—a $ 7.8 million verdict—and then the second—a $ 4.1 million jury verdict after a second trial—was the Honorable Richard A. Posner, the circuit's chief judge who in this case was wearing, by designation, the robe of a district judge. Like the instant replay official, we now review the decisions of our colleague—using the voluminous record rather than a television monitor and recognizing that our review in 1999 of a case that began in 1993 is a far cry from instant.

In another memorable quote, Evans described a case as "gummed up from the get-go", describing a case where petitioner Johnson lost his chance to be heard in federal Habeas Corpus (and thus dooming him to serve the remainder of his two consecutive life sentences) because of a delay caused by the state court which made petitioner Johnson's otherwise "properly filed" application for state review technically out of time.

An often-cited district court decision in an admiralty case from 1984 showed Evans' use of humor to veil his impatience with arguments he thought invalid:

[L]ike the Phantom Dutchman, this case has sailed once again into my harbor. The plaintiffs request that I vacate the judgment dismissing their action. Three reasons are given suggesting that I may have "lost my bearings" in reaching my earlier decision.... The plaintiffs must not have heard the foghorns which were blaring at them during the oral argument and in my earlier decision.... The plaintiffs' attempts to recast the facts are unpersuasive. Indeed, they lead only to the suspicion that had plaintiffs' counsel been at the helm of the INAGUA ESPANA, their sense of direction may have prevented the goods from reaching Scotland in the first place, seawater-soaked or no.

In Crawford v. Marion County Election Board (2007), Evans dissented when Posner, joined by Diane S. Sykes, upheld Indiana's voter ID law. The Seventh Circuit's judgment was then upheld by a fractured majority of the Supreme Court of the United States.

According to the technology website CNET.com, Evans became the first federal judge to cite a YouTube video, in a published opinion he authored July 9, 2007. Evans rejected an insurer's malpractice lawsuit against its attorney, warning that if there were liability "litigation would become more of a blood sport than it already is. Lawyers would be even more obsessive about irrelevant and tedious details. No good could come of it."

== Sources ==
Legal offices
New circuit	Wisconsin Circuit Court Judge for the Milwaukee Circuit, Branch 22; 1978 – 1979	Succeeded by William J. Haese
Seat established by 92 Stat. 1629	United States District Judge for the Eastern District of Wisconsin; 1979 – 1995	Succeeded by Charles N. Clevert Jr.
Preceded by Robert W. Warren	Chief Judge of the United States District Court for the Eastern District of Wisconsin; 1991 – 1995	Succeeded by Joseph Peter Stadtmueller
Preceded by Richard Dickson Cudahy	Judge of the United States Court of Appeals for the Seventh Circuit; 1995 – 2010	Succeeded by Michael B. Brennan
