= William Henry Seaman =

American federal judge (1842–1915)

The Honorable William Henry Seaman
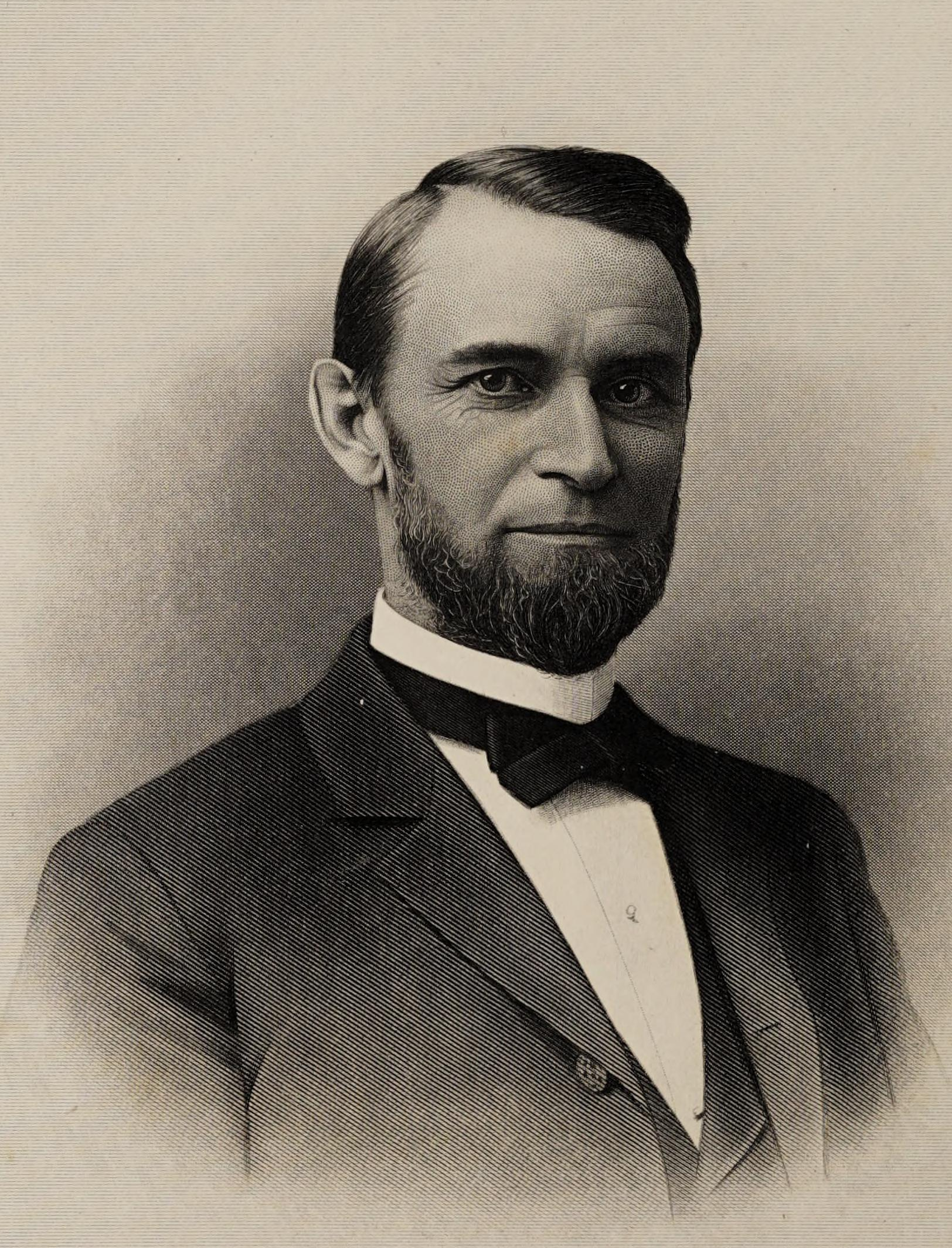

Judge of the United States Court of Appeals for the Seventh Circuit
- In office March 1, 1905 – March 8, 1915
- Appointed by: Theodore Roosevelt
- Preceded by: James Graham Jenkins
- Succeeded by: Evan Alfred Evans

Judge of the United States Circuit Courts for the Seventh Circuit
- In office March 1, 1905 – December 31, 1911
- Appointed by: Theodore Roosevelt
- Preceded by: James Graham Jenkins
- Succeeded by: Seat abolished

United States District Judge for the Eastern District of Wisconsin
- In office April 3, 1893 – March 1, 1905
- Appointed by: Grover Cleveland
- Preceded by: James Graham Jenkins
- Succeeded by: Joseph V. Quarles

21st Mayor of Sheboygan, Wisconsin
- In office April 1881 – April 1882
- Preceded by: Francis Geele
- Succeeded by: Michael Winter

Personal details
- Born: November 15, 1842 New Berlin, Wisconsin Territory
- Died: March 8, 1915 (aged 72) Coronado, California, U.S.
- Resting place: Wildwood Cemetery, Sheboygan, Wisconsin
- Party: Democratic
- Spouse: Mary A. Peat (m. 1868–1915)
- Children: Arelisle, Charles, Mary
- Parents: William Seaman (father); Arelisle (Crane) Seaman (mother)
- Education: read law
- Profession: lawyer, judge

Military service
- Allegiance: United States
- Branch/service: United States Army; Union Army
- Years of service: 1861–1866
- Rank: Sergeant
- Unit: 1st Reg. Wis. Vol. Infantry; Army of the Cumberland
- Battles/wars: American Civil War: Battle of Perryville; Battle of Stones River; Chickamauga campaign; Atlanta campaign

William Henry Seaman (November 15, 1842 – March 8, 1915) was an American lawyer, jurist and Wisconsin pioneer. He served 22 years as a United States federal judge, first as a United States district judge for the Eastern District of Wisconsin (1893–1905), and then as a judge of the 7th Circuit U.S. Court of Appeals (1905–1915). Prior to his judicial service, he was the 21st mayor of Sheboygan, Wisconsin, and served in the Union Army for nearly the entire American Civil War.

== Early life and education ==
William Henry Seaman was born in New Berlin, Wisconsin Territory, on November 15, 1842. His father, William Seaman, had brought the family to the Wisconsin Territory from Buffalo, New York, the previous year. His mother, Arelisle (Crane) Seaman, was descended from some of the earliest Puritan settlers at the Massachusetts Bay Colony. His paternal grandfather, Williams Seaman, was a Democratic state senator in the New York State Legislature.

His father had intended to bring goods to the territory and set up a store, but the supplies were lost in a shipwreck. Instead, they settled in what was then western Milwaukee County and built a saw mill and log cabin, where our William H. Seaman was born. Unfortunately, in the winter after his birth, the saw mill burned down and the family had to relocate again. This time they moved to village of Milwaukee, where his father became a harness maker. The next year they moved to Ceresco, and finally, in 1845, to Sheboygan, where his father was finally able to prosper as a merchant.

Seaman was educated in the public schools of Sheboygan until age 16, when he began working as a printer. He began studying law under Crosby W. Ellis in the nights after work, but his studies were interrupted by the outbreak of the American Civil War.

== Civil War service ==
On September 19, 1861, Seaman volunteered for service in the Union Army and was enrolled as a private in Company H, 1st Wisconsin Volunteer Infantry Regiment. After a year, he was promoted to Corporal, and eventually Sergeant. When the regiment mustered out in October 1864, Sergeant Seaman continued his service as a quartermaster on the staff of General George Henry Thomas through the end of the war.

== Legal career ==
Seaman returned to Sheboygan in September 1866, and resumed his legal studies under the tutelage of state senator John A. Bentley. In June 1868, Seaman was admitted to the State Bar of Wisconsin and entered into a partnership with Bentley, forming the law firm Bentley & Seaman. The partnership continued until 1876, when Bentley was appointed United States Pension Commissioner. Seaman subsequently partnered with Francis Williams, in 1882, in the firm Seaman & Williams, which endured for the next eleven years.

Seaman served in many local offices, including city council, school board, and, in 1881, he was elected Mayor of Sheboygan. He was a staunch Democrat, was chosen as chairman of the 1888 Wisconsin Democratic Party convention, and was a delegate for Wisconsin to the 1888 Democratic National Convention. In 1891, he was appointed to the Board of Regents of the University of Wisconsin.

== Federal judicial service ==
Seaman was nominated by President Grover Cleveland on March 27, 1893, to a seat on the United States District Court for the Eastern District of Wisconsin vacated by Judge James Graham Jenkins. He was confirmed by the United States Senate on April 3, 1893, and received his commission the same day. His service terminated on March 1, 1905, due to his elevation to the Seventh Circuit.

Seaman was nominated by President Theodore Roosevelt on February 25, 1905, to a joint seat on the United States Court of Appeals for the Seventh Circuit and the United States Circuit Courts for the Seventh Circuit vacated by Judge James Graham Jenkins. He was confirmed by the Senate on March 1, 1905, and received his commission the same day. On December 31, 1911, the Circuit Courts were abolished and he thereafter served only on the Court of Appeals. He served until his death in 1915.

== Personal life and family ==
Judge Seaman was a member of the Congregational church, the Knights Templar, the Ancient Free and Accepted Masons, and the Grand Army of the Republic.

He married Mary A. Peat on December 17, 1868. They had one son and two daughters.

He died on March 8, 1915, while on vacation in Coronado, California, with his daughter.

== See also ==
- List of mayors of Sheboygan, Wisconsin

== Sources ==
- "Seaman, William Henry 1842 - 1915". Wisconsin Historical Society. August 8, 2017.

Political offices
Preceded by Francis Geele	Mayor of Sheboygan, Wisconsin; April 1881 – April 1882	Succeeded by Michael Winter
Legal offices
Preceded by James Graham Jenkins	United States district judge for the Eastern District of Wisconsin; 1893 – 1905	Succeeded by Joseph V. Quarles
Preceded by James Graham Jenkins	Judge of the United States Circuit Courts for the Seventh Circuit; 1905 – 1911	Succeeded by Seat abolished
Preceded by James Graham Jenkins	Judge of the United States Court of Appeals for the Seventh Circuit; 1905 – 1915	Succeeded by Evan Alfred Evans
