= Federal Building (Milwaukee, Wisconsin) =

- U.S. National Register of Historic Places
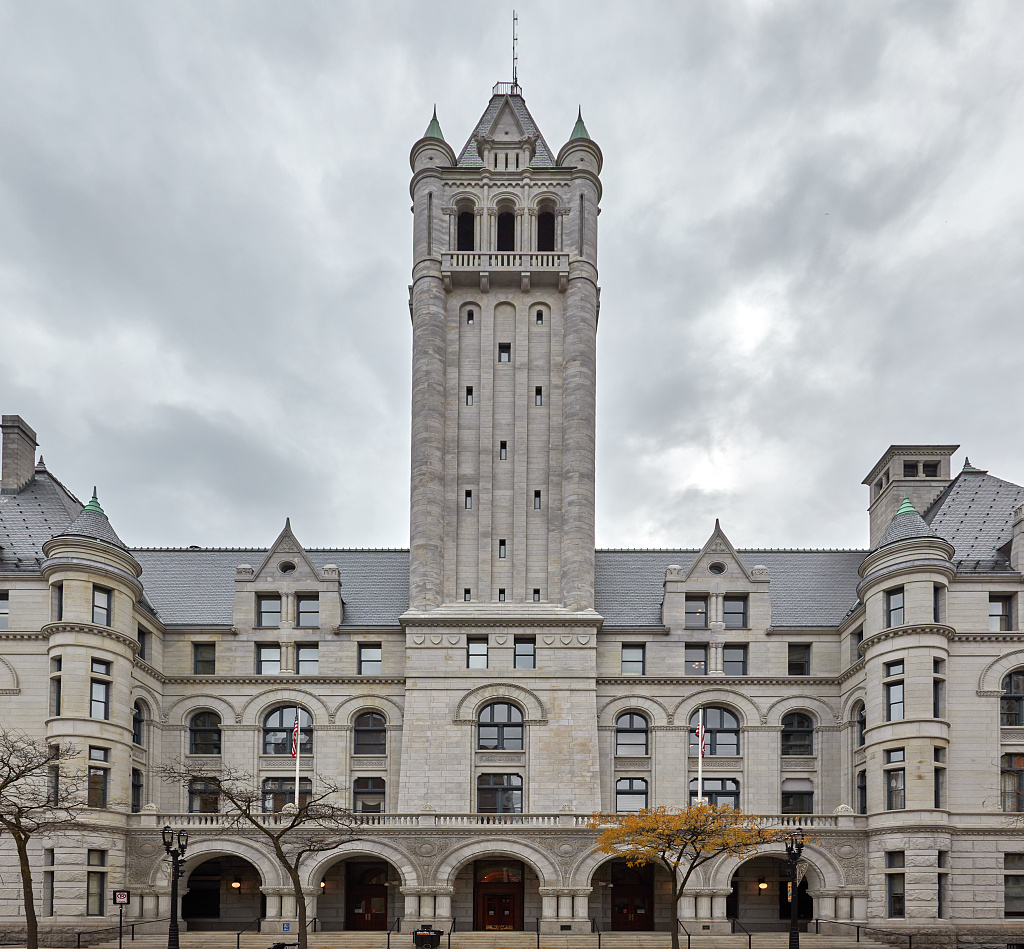
- Federal Building and U.S. Courthouse

- Location within Wisconsin Location within the United States
- Map showing the location of Federal Building, Milwaukee
- Location: 515-519 E. Wisconsin Ave., Milwaukee, Wisconsin
- Coordinates: 43°2′17″N 87°54′16″W
- Area: 3.5 acres (1.4 ha)
- Built: 1892
- Architect: Edbrooke, W.J.
- Architectural style: Romanesque, Richardsonian Romanesque
- NRHP reference No.: 73000082
- Added to NRHP: March 14, 1973

The U.S. Courthouse & Federal Office Building, Milwaukee, Wisconsin is a post office, Federal office, and courthouse building located at Milwaukee in Milwaukee County, Wisconsin. It is a courthouse for the United States District Court for the Eastern District of Wisconsin.

== Building history ==
When Milwaukee's Federal Building and U.S. Courthouse was constructed in 1892–99, it epitomized the revolutionized mail handling that had followed the introduction of postal stamps in 1847. By the end of the 19th century, added postal services included registered mail, street letter boxes, and free mail delivery. When an existing, 1859 post office became inadequate for the postal service's growing needs, Congress was persuaded to fund a new, larger building in 1889. It included multiple federal agencies under one roof—housing the U.S. Postal Service, Courts and Customs Service. Today, the District Courts are the only original tenant remaining in the building.

The massive granite edifice is a city landmark within the historic district known as Juneautown and the first ward organized from land owned by Solomon Juneau, Milwaukee's founder and first mayor. The building is surrounded by notable and contemporaneous historic buildings, including the Milwaukee Club (1883), The Pfister Hotel (1893), and the Northwestern National Insurance Building (1906). The Federal Building and U.S. Courthouse's imposing Richardsonian Romanesque architecture presented a break from the classical style that dominated Government buildings for most of the 19th century. Designed by Willoughby J. Edbrooke, Supervising Architect of the U.S. Treasury Department, the style was popularized by renowned architect Henry Hobson Richardson, whose use of the Romanesque Revival began to penetrate the Midwest during the 1880s. Edbrooke's predecessor, James G. Hill, supervising architect during the late nineteenth century, was the first federal architect to abandon classical forms. Under Hill's influence, federal structures often featured lofty towers that were visible from long distances during the period when few buildings rose above ten stories.

From 1929 to 1932, construction of a large addition extended the building southward. The addition was raised to seven stories eight years later. In 1989 -96, GSA completed a major renovation and restoration project, which restored the historic interiors to their original brilliance while incorporating modern office needs.

In 1972, the building was designated a Milwaukee City Landmark, and in 1973, it was listed in the National Register of Historic Places.

== Architecture ==
Interior of the Federal Building

Milwaukee's Federal Building and U.S. Courthouse is a detailed and picturesque five-story structure. It fills the city block bound by Michigan, Jackson, and Jefferson Streets, with its facade facing Wisconsin Avenue on the north. The building is an example of Romanesque Revival architecture, featuring a display of stone massing and heavy Roman arches. Walls of gray Mount Waldo granite rise to a steeply pitched hipped roof pierced by a variety of gabled projections. A soaring tower framed by pinnacles rises from the center of the facade, terminating in an arcaded belfry and a high pyramidal roof.

The facade is broken into recesses and projections, creating a dynamic composition punctuated by an arcaded entrance on the first level and Roman arches over the second- and third-story fenestration. Massive stone forms are relieved with fine decoration. The first story provides the greatest display of Romanesque ornament, featuring highly carved moldings and decorative stonework surrounding the main entrance. The building's corners are rounded by tall pinnacles with alternating bands of smooth and textured stone and are capped by conical roofs with layered trim. The upper-story walls are smooth, accented with thin, textured stringcourses, rising to gabled dormers that incorporate Romanesque leaf ornament, gargoyles, and finials.

Like the facade, the east and west elevations are ornamented and symmetrically balanced, prominently featuring a projecting gable with a variety of arched fenestration. The 1929-32 addition to the south adds a massive eight-story block at the rear of the original structure. Although its walls are clad in granite and include arched fenestration to match the original building, the extension is distinguished by its flat roof, flattened elevations, and reduced ornamentation.

Interior spaces on the first through fifth floors are arranged about a vast central atrium capped by an iron-and-glass skylight. The illuminated space was originally an open light well and is now used for many public events. Within the atrium's large volume, columns, marble wainscoting, oak crown molding, stenciled designs, and plaster ceiling moldings have been restored to their original finishes and colors. Although the first story's original ceiling was removed to open the room to the light well above, its steel structural members were retained to recall the room's original configuration as the postal workspace. The building's corridors, stair halls, and lobbies are adorned with multicolored marble mosaics, oak paneling, and decorative plaster ceilings. The interiors of the 1929-32 addition match the materials and colors used in 1899, harmonizing with the original interior design.

The two-story historic U.S. District Courtroom, located on the third floor, is richly detailed with carved oak paneling and trim on the walls and ceiling. Historic paint finishes have been carefully conserved to their original hue. Fine Romanesque detailing embellishes the arches over the doors, windows, and the judge's bench. Centered between the two doorways is the room's original ladies' balcony, entirely finished in oak.

A massive seven-year restoration project begun in 1989 revived the building to its original condition. The work involved extensive materials research to determine original paint colors and decorative patterns for the walls and ceilings, including the original hand-painted-and-stenciled designs in a trompe-l'œil effect (an artistic illusion of realism). Interior finishes and fixtures were restored, while the exterior stone and brickwork was conserved and repaired. Renovations created more comfortable work spaces and energy-efficient HVAC systems. Through the effort of many collaborators, the building remains one of the most venerable displays of architecture in the Milwaukee area.

== Significant events ==
- 1892-99 The U.S. Post Office, Courthouse, and Custom House is constructed.
- 1929-32 An addition to the south substantially increases the building's size. 1940 Two floors are added above the south addition.
- 1972 The building is designated a Milwaukee City Landmark.
- 1973 The building is listed in the National Register of Historic Places.
- 1989-96 The building is extensively restored and renovated.
- 2017-19 The building's historic granite façade, stone cornice, gutters at the turrets, and the balcony above the north entrance are restored.

== Building facts ==
- Architect: Willoughby J. Edbrooke
- Construction dates: 1892–1899; 1932; 1940
- Landmark status: Milwaukee City Landmark; listed in the National Register of Historic Places
- Location: 517 East Wisconsin Avenue
- Architectural style: Romanesque Revival
- Primary materials: Pale gray Mount Waldo granite
- Prominent features: Tower; atrium; Romanesque detailing; oak-paneled courtroom
