= William C. Griesbach =

American judge (born 1954)

Senior Judge of the United States District Court for the Eastern District of Wisconsin
- Incumbent
- Assumed office December 31, 2019

Chief Judge of the United States District Court for the Eastern District of Wisconsin
- In office October 31, 2012 – October 31, 2019
- Preceded by: Charles N. Clevert Jr.
- Succeeded by: Pamela Pepper

Judge of the United States District Court for the Eastern District of Wisconsin
- In office May 1, 2002 – December 31, 2019
- Appointed by: George W. Bush
- Preceded by: Seat established by 114 Stat. 2762
- Succeeded by: Byron B. Conway

Judge of the Wisconsin Circuit Court for the Brown Circuit, Branch 4
- In office October 27, 1995 – May 1, 2002
- Appointed by: Tommy Thompson
- Preceded by: Don Hanaway
- Succeeded by: Kendall M. Kelley

Personal details
- Born: January 24, 1954 (age 72) Milwaukee, Wisconsin, U.S.
- Education: Marquette University (BA, JD)

William C. Griesbach (born January 24, 1954) is a senior United States district judge for the United States District Court for the Eastern District of Wisconsin. He was appointed to the federal court in 2002, by President George W. Bush, after having served seven years as a Wisconsin circuit court judge in Brown County.

== Education and career ==
Griesbach was born in Milwaukee. He received a Bachelor of Arts degree from Marquette University in 1976 and a Juris Doctor from Marquette University Law School in 1979. He was a law clerk to Judge Bruce F. Beilfuss, Wisconsin Supreme Court from 1979 to 1980. He was a staff attorney of United States Court of Appeals for the Seventh Circuit from 1980 to 1982, thereafter entering private practice in Wisconsin from 1982 to 1987. He was an assistant district attorney in Brown County, Wisconsin, from 1987 to 1995, and a judge on the Brown County Circuit Court from 1995 to 2002.

=== Federal judicial service ===
On January 23, 2002, Griesbach was nominated by President George W. Bush to a seat on the United States District Court for the Eastern District of Wisconsin. This was a new seat created by 114 Stat. 2762. He was confirmed by the United States Senate on April 25, 2002, and received his commission on May 1, 2002. He became Chief Judge on October 31, 2012, and served a 7-year term until October 31, 2019. He assumed senior status on December 31, 2019.

=== Notable case ===
In November 2016, Griesbach dissented when Circuit Judge Kenneth Francis Ripple, joined by District Judge Barbara Brandriff Crabb, found that the high number of wasted votes created by the 2011 Wisconsin State Assembly redistricting was unconstitutional partisan gerrymandering. The opinion was vacated and remanded by the United States Supreme Court on June 18, 2018.

Legal offices
Preceded by Don Hanaway	Judge of the Wisconsin Circuit Court for the Brown Circuit, Branch 4; 1995–2002	Succeeded by Kendall M. Kelley
New seat established by 114 Stat. 2762	Judge of the United States District Court for the Eastern District of Wisconsin; 2002–2019	Succeeded by Byron B. Conway
Preceded by Charles N. Clevert Jr.	Chief Judge of the United States District Court for the Eastern District of Wisconsin; 2012–2019	Succeeded by Pamela Pepper
