= William T. Green =

African-American attorney and civil rights activist (1860–1911)

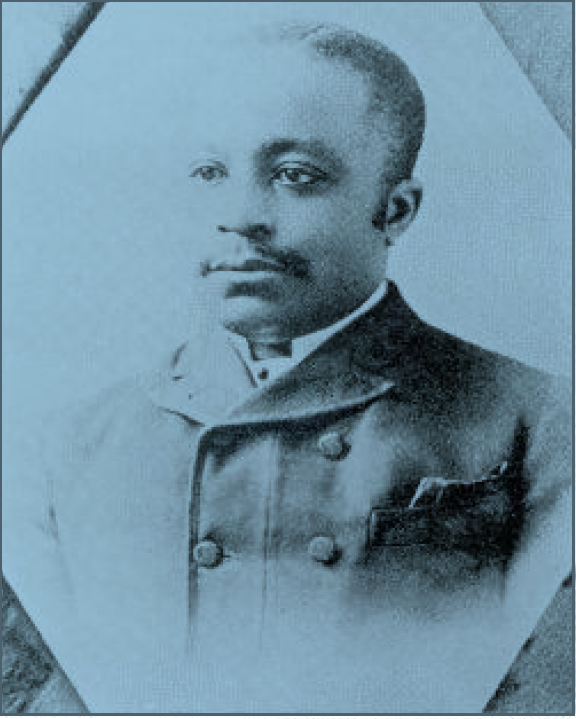
- Born: 1860; Canada
- Died: December 3, 1911 (aged 50–51)
- Alma mater: University of Wisconsin Law School
- Occupation: Lawyer

William T. Green (1860 – December 3, 1911) was an African-American attorney and civil rights activist from Milwaukee, Wisconsin. Born near Niagara Falls, Canada West in May 1860, Green immigrated to the United States in 1884, and within a couple of years, he became a leader of the African-American community in Milwaukee.

Green had a common school education and attended St. Catherines Collegiate Institute. After moving to Wisconsin in 1887 and working as a janitor in the state capitol building, he became one of the first black graduates of the University of Wisconsin Law School in 1892 (he is sometimes erroneously reported as the first), and as of his death, he was the only black lawyer in Milwaukee and local African-American member of the Wisconsin Bar Association. He established himself with an office in the Birchard Block in Milwaukee in 1893. His legal work ranged from murder and assault, to worker's compensation and constitutional issues.

== Howell vs. Litt ==
After one Owen Howell was denied permission to sit in the main level of the Bijou Opera House in Milwaukee, Green organized the Union League of Wisconsin and helped Howell file a lawsuit against the building's proprietor, Jacob Litt. In Howell vs. Litt, Wisconsin Supreme Court Justice ruled that discrimination by race was illegal. Green became the first black attorney that argued a case before the Wisconsin Supreme Court when representing Owen Howell. This lawsuit led to the creation of the state's Wisconsin Civil Rights Act of 1895. The Chapter 223 bill, which Green drafted, ended up becoming the foundation of modern civil rights legislation in the state of Wisconsin on April 13, 1895. The bill, entitled "An act to protect all citizens in their civil and legal rights", outlawed discrimination in saloons, restaurants, inns, barbershops, and most other public locations.

He was retained by the Afro-American League of Milwaukee to appear before the legislature against the Cady Bill, which sought to ban the marriage of negroes and whites. He debated the author of the bill, Frank A. Cady of Wood County; and the bill was subsequently defeated in the legislature.

== Politics ==
Green became an active member of the Republican Party, and was elected as a delegate from Milwaukee to its conventions. While he was an acknowledged leader of black Republicans in Milwaukee, the state GOP never rewarded his loyalty with an endorsement for local elected offices such as district attorney or justice of the peace.

== Death ==
Green died December 3, 1911, and is buried in Forest Home Cemetery.

== See also ==
- List of first minority male lawyers and judges in Washington
