= United States District Court for the Eastern District of Wisconsin =

United States federal trial court of limited jurisdiction

Coordinates: 43°02′17.7″N 87°54′16.5″W

- (E.D. Wis.)
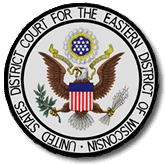
- Location: Federal Building (Milwaukee) More locations: Green Bay; Oshkosh
- Appeals to: Seventh Circuit
- Established: June 30, 1870
- Judges: 5
- Chief Judge: Pamela Pepper

Officers of the court
- U.S. Attorney: Brad Schimel (interim)
- U.S. Marshal: Anna M. Ruzinski
- www.wied.uscourts.gov

The United States District Court for the Eastern District of Wisconsin (in case citations, E.D. Wis.) is a federal trial court of limited jurisdiction. The court is under the auspices of the United States Court of Appeals for the Seventh Circuit, although patent claims and claims against the federal government under the Tucker Act are appealed to the United States Court of Appeals for the Federal Circuit. The Eastern District was established on June 30, 1870.

The district's headquarters, central courthouse, and the majority of its offices are located in Milwaukee, but the northern counties of the district are serviced by a courthouse in Green Bay. Currently, Pamela Pepper is the district's chief judge. As of November 17, 2025, the interim United States attorney for the district is Brad Schimel.

== Organization of the court ==
The United States District Court for the Eastern District of Wisconsin is one of two federal judicial districts in Wisconsin. Court for the Eastern District is held at Green Bay and Milwaukee.

Green Bay Division comprises the following counties: Brown, Calumet, Door, Florence, Forest, Kewaunee, Langlade, Manitowoc, Marinette, Menominee, Oconto, Outagamie, Shawano, Waupaca, Waushara, and Winnebago.

Milwaukee Division comprises the following counties: Dodge, Fond du Lac, Green Lake, Kenosha, Marquette, Milwaukee, Ozaukee, Racine, Sheboygan, Walworth, Washington, and Waukesha.

== Current judges ==
As of November 4, 2024:

#	Title	Judge	Duty station	Born	Term of service			Appointed by
#	Title	Judge	Duty station	Born	Active	Chief	Senior	Appointed by
21	Chief Judge	Pamela Pepper	Milwaukee	1964	2014–present	2019–present	—	Obama
16	District Judge	Joseph Stadtmueller	Milwaukee	1942	1987–present	1995–2002	—	Reagan
19	District Judge	Lynn Adelman	Milwaukee	1939	1997–present	—	—	Clinton
22	District Judge	Brett H. Ludwig	Milwaukee	1969	2020–present	—	—	Trump
23	District Judge	Byron B. Conway	Green Bay	1976	2024–present	—	—	Biden
20	Senior Judge	William C. Griesbach	Green Bay	1954	2002–2019	2012–2019	2019–present	G.W. Bush

== Former judges ==
#	Judge	Born–died	Active service	Chief Judge	Senior status	Appointed by	Reason for termination
1	Andrew G. Miller	1801–1874	1870–1873 (Note: Reassigned from the District of Wisconsin.)	—	—	Polk/Operation of law	retirement
2	James Henry Howe	1827–1893	1873–1875	—	—	Grant	resignation
3	Charles E. Dyer	1834–1905	1875–1888	—	—	Grant	resignation
4	James Graham Jenkins	1834–1921	1888–1893	—	—	Cleveland	elevation
5	William Henry Seaman	1842–1915	1893–1905	—	—	Cleveland	elevation
6	Joseph V. Quarles	1843–1911	1905–1911	—	—	T. Roosevelt	death
7	Ferdinand August Geiger	1867–1939	1912–1939	—	—	Taft	retirement
8	F. Ryan Duffy	1888–1979	1939–1949	—	—	F. Roosevelt	elevation
9	Robert Emmet Tehan	1905–1975	1949–1971	1954–1971	1971–1975	Truman	death
10	Kenneth Philip Grubb	1895–1976	1955–1965	—	—	Eisenhower	retirement
11	John W. Reynolds Jr.	1921–2002	1965–1986	1971–1986	1986–2002	L. Johnson	death
12	Myron L. Gordon	1918–2009	1967–1983	—	1983–2009	L. Johnson	death
13	Robert W. Warren	1925–1998	1974–1991	1986–1991	1991–1998	Ford (Note: Warren was nominated by President Nixon but was appointed to the Court by (i.e., received his commission from) President Ford.)	death
14	Terence T. Evans	1940–2011	1979–1995	1991–1995	—	Carter	elevation
15	Thomas John Curran	1924–2012	1983–1997	—	1997–2012	Reagan	death
17	Rudolph T. Randa	1940–2016	1992–2016	2002–2009	2016	G.H.W. Bush	death
18	Charles N. Clevert Jr.	1947–present	1996–2012	2009–2012	2012–2017	Clinton	retirement

== Chief judges ==
Chief judges have administrative responsibilities with respect to their district court. Unlike the Supreme Court, where one justice is specifically nominated to be chief, the office of chief judge rotates among the district court judges. To be chief, a judge must have been in active service on the court for at least one year, be under the age of 65, and have not previously served as chief judge.

A vacancy is filled by the judge highest in seniority among the group of qualified judges. The chief judge serves for a term of seven years, or until age 70, whichever occurs first. The age restrictions are waived if no members of the court would otherwise be qualified for the position.

When the office was created in 1948, the chief judge was the longest-serving judge who had not elected to retire, on what has since 1958 been known as senior status, or declined to serve as chief judge. After August 6, 1959, judges could not become or remain chief after turning 70 years old. The current rules have been in operation since October 1, 1982.

== Succession of seats ==
Seat 1
Seat reassigned from the District of Wisconsin on June 30, 1870, by 16 Stat. 171
Miller	1870–1873
Howe	1873–1875
Dyer	1875–1888
Jenkins	1888–1893
Seaman	1893–1905
Quarles Jr.	1905–1911
Geiger	1912–1939
Duffy	1939–1949
Tehan	1949–1971
Warren	1974–1991
Randa	1992–2016
Ludwig	2020–present

Seat 2
Seat established on February 10, 1954, by 68 Stat. 8
Grubb	1955–1965
Reynolds Jr.	1965–1986
Stadtmueller	1987–present

Seat 3
Seat established on March 18, 1966, by 80 Stat. 75 (temporary)
Seat made permanent on June 2, 1970, by 84 Stat. 294
Gordon	1967–1983
Curran	1983–1997
Adelman	1997–present

Seat 4
Seat established on October 20, 1978, by 92 Stat. 1629
Evans	1979–1995
Clevert Jr.	1996–2012
Pepper	2014–present

Seat 5
Seat established on December 21, 2000, by 114 Stat. 2762
Griesbach	2002–2019
Conway	2024–present

== See also ==
- Courts of Wisconsin
- List of current United States district judges
- List of United States federal courthouses in Wisconsin
