= Recall elections in Wisconsin =

Process in Wisconsin to remove elected officials from office

A recall election in the state of Wisconsin is a procedure by which voters can remove an elected official from office through a direct vote before the official's term has ended.

== History ==
In 1911, newly elected Governor Francis E. McGovern laid out his progressive vision for Wisconsin, which included a proposal for a recall. The next week, State Senator Paul O. Husting introduced Senate Joint Resolution 9, which allowed for the recall of every office holder in the state, including both those elected and appointed. Several senators did not like that the recall also applied to judges, and attached an exemption for judges. The bill passed the Senate 20-7. The bill was then passed by the Assembly 64-1.

Since proposed amendments to the Wisconsin Constitution must pass two consecutive legislatures before going to the people for a vote, Husting introduced his bill again on February 11, 1913. The bill passed the Senate 26-1, and the Assembly 72-17. The proposed amendment then went to the voters, who, in November 1914, voted it down by a margin of 64 percent to 36 percent.

A second attempt at a recall amendment came in 1923, when Senator Henry Huber introduced Senate Joint Resolution 39, which allowed for the recall of public officials. It passed the Senate 17-12, and the Assembly 60-10. In 1924, Huber was elected Lieutenant Governor of Wisconsin, so the second introduction of the resolution was taken up by Max W. Heck. It passed the Senate 22-8, and the Assembly 70-22. The resolution was scheduled to appear on the November 2, 1926 ballot.

There was strong opposition to the proposed amendment, because it allowed for the recall of state judges. Organizations, such as the State Bar of Wisconsin, the Milwaukee Bar Association, Archbishop Sebastian Gebhard Messmer and the editorial boards of the Milwaukee Journal and the Milwaukee Sentinel.

The proposed amendment also had its supporters, including the editorial board of the Wisconsin State Journal, the Wisconsin State Federation of Labor, and U.S. Senator Robert M. La Follette Jr.

The amendment passed, by a margin of 50.6 percent to 49.4 percent.

In 2011, State Senator Jim Holperin became the first state legislator to be subject to a recall in two different legislative bodies: the Assembly in 1990, and the State Senate in 2011.

In 2012, Governor Scott Walker became the first governor in U.S. history to survive a recall.

== Legislation summary ==
=== 1926 creation ===
The recall was officially created in November 1926 by constitutional amendment. The rules established in the constitution are:

- Voters may petition for the recall of any elected official after the first year of their term
- The petition must be signed by voters equal to at least 25 percent of the vote in the last gubernatorial election in the district from which the elected official is to be recalled
- A special election will be held between 40 and 45 days from the filing of the petition
- The official being recalled will continue to perform their duties until the result of the election is officially declared
- Other candidates for the office will be nominated in accordance with normal election rules
- The candidate who receives the most votes will serve for the remainder of the term
- The name of the elected official who is being recalled will be on the ballot unless they resign within 10 days of the petition being filed
- After one successful petition and election, no other recall attempts can be made for the remainder of the term

=== 1981 amendment ===
In 1981, the constitution was amended, which changed the rules for recalls. This amendment changed the rules, which follow:

- Voters may petition for the recall of any elected official after the first year of their term
- The petition must be signed by voters equal to at least 25 percent of the vote in the last gubernatorial election in the district from which the elected official is to be recalled
- A special election will be held on the Tuesday six weeks after the petition is filed, or the next Tuesday if that day is a holiday
- The official being recalled will continue to perform their duties until the result of the election is officially declared
- Other candidates for the office will be nominated in accordance with normal election rules
- If more than two people run for a nonpartisan office, or if more than two people run in the same political party for a partisan office, a recall primary will be held
- In the case of a recall primary, the date above will be used, and the general election will be held on the Tuesday four weeks after the primary
- The name of the elected official who is being recalled will be on the ballot unless they resign within 10 days of the petition being filed
- After one successful petition and election, no other recall attempts can be made for the remainder of the term

== Recall attempts ==
=== Successful recalls ===
- 1977 recall of Dane County Judge Archie Simonson
- 1977 recall of five members of the La Crosse School Board
- 1992 recall of four members of the La Crosse School Board
- 1996 recall of State Senator George Petak
- 2000 recall of Margaret Ciccone, Mayor of Superior, Wisconsin
- 2002 recall of multiple Milwaukee County, Wisconsin, elected county officials including Executive F. Thomas Ament (resigned before election); Board Chair Karen Ordinans; and Board Supervisors Penny Podell, LeAnn Launstein, David Jasenski, Kathy Arciszewski, James McGuigan, and Linda Ryan. All were recalled due to a retirement pension controversy.
- 2003 recall of State Senator Gary George
- 2009 recall of seven Monroe County, Wisconsin board members
- 2009 recall of one Monroe County, Wisconsin board member
- 2011 recall of State Senator Randy Hopper
- 2011 recall of State Senator Dan Kapanke
- 2012 recall of Bob Ryan, Mayor of Sheboygan, Wisconsin
- 2012 recall of State Senator Van H. Wanggaard
- 2015 Door County, successful recall of 13 of 15, out of 21 County Board members total.
- 2017 recall of Jake Speed, Onalaska School Board member
- 2018 recall of Taavi McMahon, Trempealeau County District Attorney
- 2021 recall of Ronnie Rossberger, Mellen School Board Vice-President
- 2025 recall of Angela Hansen-Winker, Wrightstown Community School District school board member
- 2025 recall of William Landgraf, Village of DeForest trustee

=== Unsuccessful recalls ===
- 1932 recall of State Senator Otto Mueller
- 1981 recall of State Senator Thomas Harnisch
- 1990 recall of State Assemblyman Jim Holperin
- 1990 recall of US Congressmen Dave Obey
- 2009 recall of one Monroe County, Wisconsin board member
- 2011 recall of State Senator Dave Hansen
- 2011 recall of State Senator Robert Cowles
- 2011 recall of State Senator Sheila Harsdorf
- 2011 recall of State Senator Luther Olsen
- 2011 recall of State Senator Alberta Darling
- 2011 recall of State Senator Robert Wirch
- 2011 recall of State Senator Jim Holperin
- 2012 recall of Governor Scott Walker
- 2012 recall of Lieutenant Governor Rebecca Kleefisch
- 2012 recall of State Senator Scott L. Fitzgerald
- 2012 recall of State Senator Terry Moulton
- 2013 recall of La Crosse, Wisconsin Common Council President Audrey Kader
- 2016 recall of three members of the Town of Paris Board, Kenosha County
- 2021 recall of four Mequon-Thiensville School Board members; Wendy Francour, Erik Hollander, Akram Khan, Chris Schultz
- 2021 recall of Butternut School Board President, Gary Mertig
- 2024 recall of Janell Wise, Raymond school board member

== See also ==
- Recall election
- Wisconsin Senate recall elections, 2011
- Wisconsin Senate recall elections, 2012
- Wisconsin gubernatorial recall election, 2012
