= List of Milwaukee County executives =

Executive of Milwaukee County
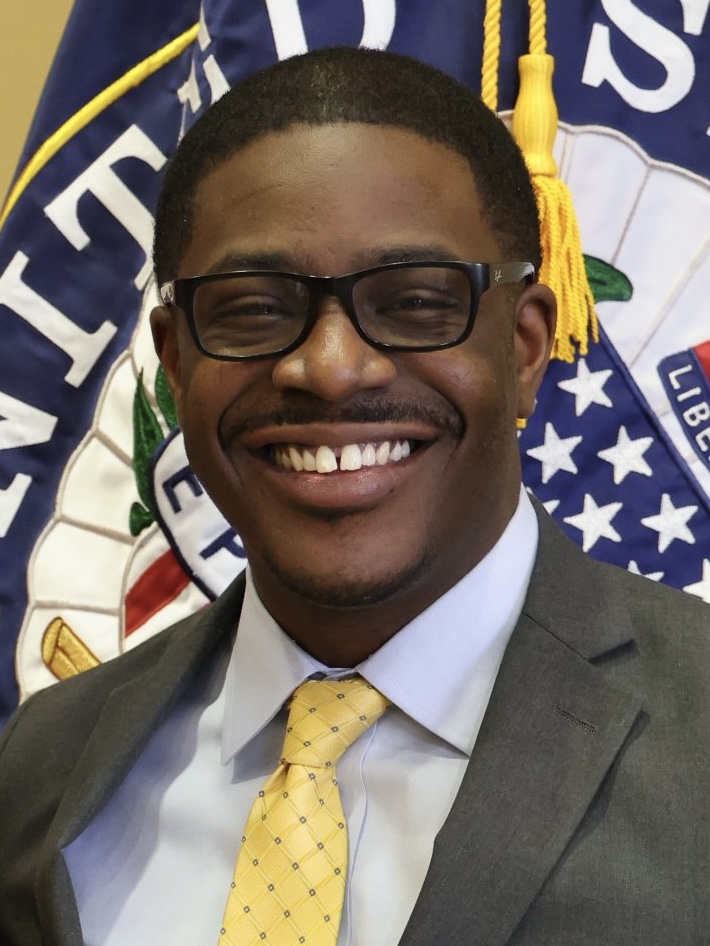
- Incumbent; David Crowley since May 4, 2020
- Type: Executive
- Term length: 4 years
- Formation: 1960
- First holder: John Doyne

The Milwaukee County executive serves as the chief executive officer of Milwaukee County, Wisconsin. Vested with veto power and appointing authority over department heads, the county executive oversees the administrative functions of county government and carries out ordinances passed by the Milwaukee County Board of Supervisors. The county executive is elected to a four-year term; there are no term limits. Vacancies in the office are filled temporarily by the chairman of the County Board, who may personally appoint an interim county executive until such time as a special election may be held. The office of county executive was created in 1960; executive functions were consolidated under the office during the tenure of County Executive Bill O'Donnell. Prior to 1960, the County Board and its chairman conducted county administration unilaterally.

== County executives ==
No.	Executive	Image	Party	Took office	Left office	Notes
1	John Doyne		Democratic	1960	1976	
2	William O'Donnell		Democratic	1976	1988	
3	Dave Schulz		Democratic	1988	1992	
4	Tom Ament		Democratic	1992	2002	
—	Karen Ordinans		Democratic	2002	2002	Acting
—	Janine Geske		Nonpartisan	2002	2002	Interim
5	Scott Walker		Republican	April 30, 2002	December 27, 2010	
—	Lee Holloway		Democratic	December 27, 2010	February 4, 2011	Acting
—	Marvin Pratt		Democratic	February 4, 2011	April 25, 2011	Interim
6	Chris Abele		Democratic	April 25, 2011	May 4, 2020	
7	David Crowley		Democratic	May 4, 2020	Incumbent	
