= William O'Donnell (Wisconsin politician) =

American politician

William F. O'Donnell

Milwaukee County Executive
- In office 1976–1988
- Preceded by: John Doyne
- Succeeded by: David Schulz

Chairman of the Milwaukee County Board of Supervisors
- In office 1975–1976
- Preceded by: William E. Meaux (acting)
- Succeeded by: F. Thomas Ament

Personal details
- Born: February 6, 1922
- Died: September 4, 2004 (aged 82) Milwaukee, Wisconsin, U.S.

William F. O'Donnell (February 6, 1922 – September 4, 2004) was a Wisconsin politician and the second Milwaukee County Executive, serving from 1976 to 1988. Prior to serving as county executive, O'Donnell was the chairman of the Milwaukee County Board of Supervisors from 1975 to 1976.

== Early career ==
O'Donnell was raised on Milwaukee's near west side, where his father worked as a plumber. O'Donnell attended Lincoln High School but dropped out at age 17 to seek employment, as his family's income was severely affected by the Great Depression. He served in the United States Army during World War II as a navigator on a B-17 and was employed as a factory and brewery worker in Milwaukee following his discharge. In 1948, O'Donnell was elected to the Milwaukee County Board of Supervisors. A political liberal and supporter of City of Milwaukee interests on the board, O'Donnell introduced legislation in 1958 establishing the office of Milwaukee County Executive.

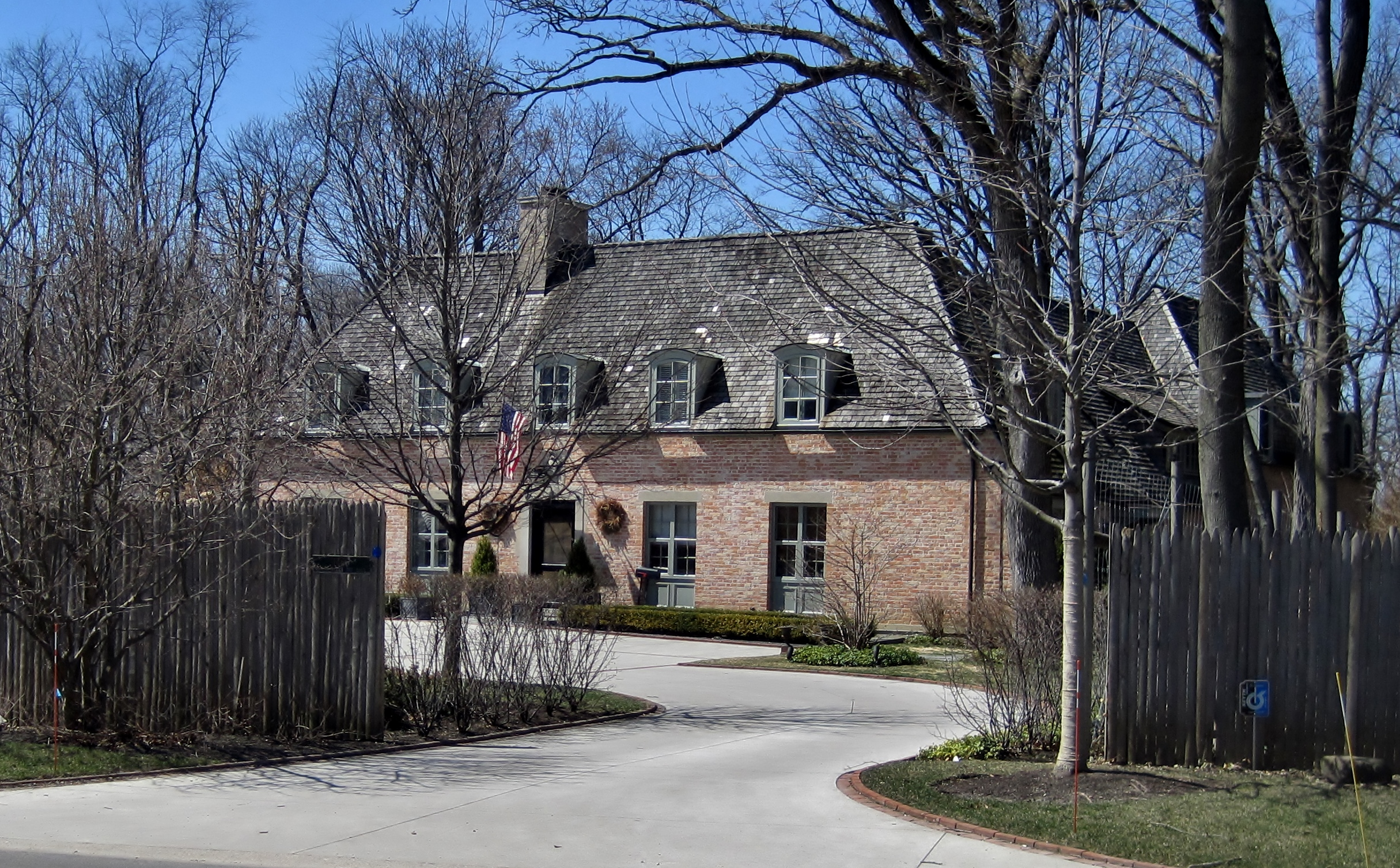
The William T. O'Donnell House in the Green Bay Road Historic District, Wisconsin, built in 1929

In 1964, County Executive John Doyne appointed O'Donnell as chairman of the Milwaukee County Welfare Board; in May 1975, O'Donnell's fellow county supervisors elected him as county board chairman. A transit advocate who commuted to work by bus, O'Donnell oversaw Milwaukee County's acquisition of the privately run local bus system in 1975. Upon Doyne's retirement in 1976, O'Donnell ran to replace him as county executive. He emerged first in the February 1976 primary and defeated Milwaukee County District Attorney E. Michael McCann in the April general election.

== Tenure as County Executive ==
O'Donnell characterized his political persona as that of a "good solid anchor". As county executive, he centralized county administration, creating cabinet positions by removing administrators' civil service protections and abolishing independent agencies such as the Welfare Board and the Milwaukee County Park Commission. O'Donnell expanded the county's administrative staff, was the first county executive to appoint a chief of staff (Leo Talsky Jr.), and sought to reduce the county's property tax levy. Generally supportive of welfare programs, he directly supervised county services for the elderly and disabled and worked to reduce number of individuals on county welfare rolls.

Despite his long tenure as a county supervisor, O'Donnell clashed at times with the board and his successor as chairman, F. Thomas Ament. In 1980, after Ament supported O'Donnell's general election challenger, O'Donnell backed another supervisor's unsuccessful bid to unseat Ament from the board chairmanship.

=== Schulz firing and 1988 reelection campaign ===
In 1984, O'Donnell appointed Chicago budget official Dave Schulz, a Milwaukee native, as Milwaukee County budget director. In 1985, O'Donnell appointed Schulz as director of the Milwaukee County Parks Department; the charismatic Schulz gained notoriety for his promotion of the park system. In 1987, Schulz violated O'Donnell's prohibition on political endorsements by county administrators, publicly supporting reformist candidate John O. Norquist for Mayor of Milwaukee. O'Donnell dismissed Schulz, who promptly filed to run for county executive in 1988.

Schulz waged a vigorous campaign and defeated O'Donnell in the April 1988 general election. Following his defeat, O'Donnell lived in retirement until his death on September 4, 2004, at age 82.
