= David Schultz =

David Schultz or Dave Schultz may refer to:

- Dave Schultz (ice hockey) (born 1949), Canadian ice hockey player and coach
- Dave Schultz (amateur wrestler) (1959–1996), American Olympic wrestler
- David Schultz (professional wrestler) (born 1955), American professional wrestler
- David Schultz (political scientist) (born 1958), American political scientist and lawyer

== See also ==
- Dave Schulz (disambiguation)
