= Dave Schulz =

Dave Schulz may refer to:

- Dave Schulz (musician), American keyboardist
- Dave Schulz (politician) (1949–2007), American politician

== See also ==
- David Schultz (disambiguation)
