= David Schultz (political scientist) =

American political scientist and legal scholar (born 1958)

- Born: David Andrew Schultz; 1958 (age 67–68)
- Citizenship: American
- Known for: Scholarship on election law and democratic theory; expert affidavit in State v. Weeks (2025)
- Awards: Leslie A. Whittington Excellence in Teaching Award (2013); APSA Distinguished Award for Civic and Community Engagement (2026)

Academic background
- Education: Binghamton University (BA, MA); Rutgers University (MA); University of Minnesota (PhD, JD); University of London (LLM); James Cook University (MA)

Academic work
- Discipline: Political science, law
- Sub-discipline: election law, constitutional law, public administration
- Institutions: Hamline University; University of Minnesota Law School; General Jonas Žemaitis Military Academy of Lithuania

David Andrew Schultz (born 1958), is an American political scientist and lawyer. He is Distinguished University Professor of Political Science, Environmental Studies, and Legal Studies at Hamline University in Saint Paul, Minnesota, where he holds the Winston Folkers Endowed Distinguished Faculty Chair, and he teaches constitutional and state and local law at the University of St. Thomas School of Law. His books are about election law, the jurisprudence of Antonin Scalia, swing states in presidential elections, and the democratic basis of electoral regulation.

In 2026, the American Political Science Association honored him with its Distinguished Award for Civic and Community Engagement for his work on documenting racial disparities in Minnesota jury pools in Minnesota, and in 2013 he won the NASPAA Leslie A. Whittington Excellence in Teaching Award. Schultz worked as legal counsel for Ralph Nader in his 2000 presidential campaign. He represented the Independence Party and the Green Party in Minnesota, and was an expert witness on election law matters in several cases for the Minnesota Attorney General’s Office.

== Early life and education ==
Schultz was born in 1958. He earned a Bachelor's degree in Political Science and Philosophy and a Master's degree in Philosophy at Binghamton University. His master's degree in Political Science was earned at Rutgers University. Schultz completed his Ph.D. in Political Science and a Juris Doctor at the University of Minnesota. Schultz also holds an LLM from the University of London. He earned a master's degree in astronomy at James Cook University in Australia.

== Early and academic career ==
Before his academic career, Schultz worked in local government and community development. He worked as a city director of planning, zoning, and code enforcement and as a housing and economic planner for a community action agency. In 1987 he was listed as a staff member of the Division of Local Government Assistance in the Maryland Department of Economic and Community Development.

Schultz later served as executive director of Common Cause Minnesota and as a vice president of the Minnesota and South Texas chapters of the American Civil Liberties Union. He taught at Trinity University in Texas and there he was president of the campus chapter of the American Association of University Professors, and later became the association's Committee A state chair in Minnesota. Schultz is licensed to practice law in Minnesota and before the Supreme Court of the United States.

By 2002, Schultz was director of the doctoral program in public administration and a professor in the Graduate School of Public Administration and Management at Hamline University, and an adjunct professor of law at the University of Minnesota. As of 2026, He is Distinguished University Professor in Hamline's departments of political science, environmental studies, and legal studies and holds the Winston Folkers Endowed Distinguished Faculty Chair. He teaches election law at the University of Minnesota Law School, where the APSA award committee described him in 2026 as a visiting professor, and has also taught at the University of St. Thomas School of Law. He holds a professorship at the General Jonas Žemaitis Military Academy of Lithuania.

Schultz was editor-in-chief of the Journal of Public Affairs Education, the journal of the Network of Schools of Public Policy, Affairs, and Administration. He has been a Fulbright scholar four times. His first three Fulbright projects took him to Armenia, Hungary, and Lithuania. In March 2023 he received a Fulbright Specialist award to teach at the University of Latvia Faculty of Law and to carry out programs for the U.S. Embassy in Riga. In Lithuania he has lectured at the Law Institute of Lithuania in Vilnius on redistricting and electoral systems and is a visiting lecturer at Mykolas Romeris University.

== Published work ==
Schultz's early published work (with Robert Maranto) was about the history and politics of civil service reform in the United States, including an article in Public Administration Review in 1993 and the book The Politics of Civil Service Reform (1997).

With Christopher E. Smith he wrote The Jurisprudential Vision of Justice Antonin Scalia (1996), an analysis of Scalia's opinions during his first decade on the Supreme Court. The book was reviewed in the American Political Science Review, The Journal of Politics, and The Review of Politics, where Paul Weithman wrote that the authors "demonstrate, by painstaking analysis of his opinions, that Scalia is able to arrive at the verdicts he does only by invoking a set of normative and interpretive commitments that goes far beyond the textualism he espouses." Twenty years later, Schultz and Howard Schweber edited The Conservative Revolution of Antonin Scalia (2018), a collection of thirteen essays to which Schultz contributed a chapter on Scalia's administrative law record.

In 2000, Schultz and Ann Conley published "Jesse Ventura and the Brave New World of Politainer Politics" in the Journal of American & Comparative Cultures, introducing the term "politainer" for a politician whose public identity is built on entertainment celebrity, with the recently elected Minnesota governor Jesse Ventura as their case.

With Scott L. McLean and Manfred B. Steger, Schultz edited Social Capital: Critical Perspectives on Community and "Bowling Alone" in 2002, a collection responding to Robert D. Putnam's social capital thesis. The work was well received and one reviewer in Voluntas wrote that the reader "emerges with a good sense of the gaps in Putnam's work."

Schultz has written on the corporatization of American higher education. In an essay in Logos, "The Rise and Demise of the Neo-Liberal University," he distinguished a postwar "Dewey university," centered on public institutions and the education of citizens, from the "corporate university" that he argued replaced it in the mid-1970s. Rudy Fichtenbaum, then president of the American Association of University Professors, engaged the argument in Academe in 2012, writing that Schultz "raises interesting questions" but "misses the fact that contradictory forces have always existed in American higher education." Schultz returned to the subject in Academe in 2015. He argued that the corporate university "is being undone by the very forces that created it."

In his book Election Law and Democratic Theory (2014), Schultz shows how American courts decide election law cases without a basis in democratic theory and that the field itself should connect its rules to "a broader set of democratic values." He incorporates ideas from James Madison and Robert A. Dahl to assess Supreme Court decisions on voting rights, minority rights, reapportionment, political parties, and campaign finance since the 1960s, considering Bush v. Gore as its central example. Henry Flores called each chapter "extremely well documented from both a scholarly and legal perspective."

He co-edited, with Jurij Toplak, the Routledge Handbook of Election Law (2022), a cross-national reference work with contributors from six continents.

In 2015, he edited Presidential Swing States: Why Only Ten Matter with Stacey Hunter Hecht. The work is a collected state-by-state studies of the states that decided presidential elections between 1988 and 2012. Later editions appeared, and the third edition (2022), edited with Rafael Jacob, sorted states into "classic," "on the bubble," and "emerging" swing states. Austin Trantham, in the Florida Political Chronicle, called it "a useful, accessible text that captures the intricacies of battleground areas within today's electoral politics."

In 2022, his book Constitutional Precedent in US Supreme Court Reasoning was published by Edward Elgar Publishing. Schultz studies how the Court under successive chief justices has treated and overruled constitutional precedent.

In 2024, he edited Generational Politics in the United States: From the Silents to Gen Z and Beyond (University of Michigan Press, 2024) with Sally Friedman. He is also co-author, with W. Phillips Shively, of the sixteenth edition of the introductory textbook Power and Choice.

Schultz's work with Lithuanian colleagues produced the two-volume Democratic Resilience in the Baltics (Springer, 2025), edited with Rasa Smaliukienė and Vidmantė Giedraitytė of the Lithuanian Military Academy. Outside political science, he edited a posthumous collection of essays by the philosopher Leon J. Goldstein, Conceptual Tension (2014), and wrote The Andromeda Galaxy and the Rise of Modern Astronomy (Springer, 2012), a history of how observation of M31 shaped modern cosmology.

== Public engagement and legal work ==
Schultz was counsel, with Alan W. Weinblatt and Maura J. Shuttleworth, for the plaintiffs in Kahn v. Griffin, a challenge to the City of Minneapolis's failure to hold council elections immediately after the 2000 redistricting. On a question certified from the federal district court, the Minnesota Supreme Court held in August 2005 that the state constitution does not protect the right to vote more broadly than the federal constitution on that point.

Minnesota news outlets have used Schultz as an election law commentator for many years. In 2012 MinnPost described him as an "elections expert" and quoted his analysis of how a proposed voter identification amendment to the state constitution could be left unimplemented by the legislature.

Schultz’s research on the Sixth Amendment right to a jury drawn from a fair cross-section of the community in the 2020s became pro bono expert work. At the request of public defenders for Atravius Weeks, a Black man convicted of murder in Dakota County, Minnesota and sentenced to life without parole, he prepared an affidavit on the racial composition of the county's jury pools. In a random sample of sixty prospective jurors for Weeks’ trial, only one was Black. And, the county was 7.5% Black. In the affidavit he used 2020 census data on voter registration by race and the Dakota County jury office records for the years 2018 to 2023, as well as a statistical report prepared by Gary Oehlert, to conclude that relying on voter registration lists and driver’s license lists would not produce a representative pool of jurors. The Minnesota Supreme Court, in State v. Weeks, remanded the case on 15 October 2025 with instructions that Weeks was entitled to an evidentiary hearing on the issue of whether there was systematic exclusion of minorities from the jury pools. His expert work in the Weeks’ case, as well as his work on two Minnesota task forces on racial disparities in the following years, was the basis for the APSA award committee’s decision to give Schultz the 2026 award for civic engagement.

Schultz has also written for audiences in the Baltic states. A January 2025 commentary in the Lithuanian outlet Alfa, arguing that "a Europe without the US as an ally could become a reality," was summarized in the Kyiv Post. He is editor-in-chief of the Minneapolis Times.

== Awards and honors ==
- 2013 – Leslie A. Whittington Excellence in Teaching Award, Network of Schools of Public Policy, Affairs, and Administration
- 2023 – Fulbright Specialist award, University of Latvia (his fourth Fulbright award)
- 2026 – Distinguished Award for Civic and Community Engagement, American Political Science Association

== Selected publications ==
- with Robert Maranto. The Politics of Civil Service Reform. New York: Peter Lang, 1997.
- with Christopher E. Smith. The Jurisprudential Vision of Justice Antonin Scalia. Lanham, MD: Rowman & Littlefield, 1996.
- ed., with Scott L. McLean and Manfred B. Steger. Social Capital: Critical Perspectives on Community and "Bowling Alone". New York: New York University Press, 2002.
- The Andromeda Galaxy and the Rise of Modern Astronomy. New York: Springer, 2012.
- Election Law and Democratic Theory. Farnham: Ashgate, 2014.
- ed. Leon J. Goldstein, Conceptual Tension: Essays on Kinship, Politics, and Individualism. Lanham, MD: Lexington Books, 2014.
- ed., with Stacey Hunter Hecht. Presidential Swing States: Why Only Ten Matter. Lanham, MD: Rowman & Littlefield, 2015. 3rd ed., with Rafael Jacob, 2022.
- ed., with Howard Schweber. The Conservative Revolution of Antonin Scalia. Lanham, MD: Lexington Books, 2018.
- Constitutional Precedent in US Supreme Court Reasoning. Cheltenham: Edward Elgar, 2022.
- ed., with Jurij Toplak. Routledge Handbook of Election Law. London: Routledge, 2022.
- ed., with Sally Friedman. Generational Politics in the United States: From the Silents to Gen Z and Beyond. Ann Arbor: University of Michigan Press, 2024.
- ed., with Rasa Smaliukienė and Vidmantė Giedraitytė. Democratic Resilience in the Baltics. 2 vols. Cham: Springer, 2025.
- ed., with John R. Vile and Michelle Deardorff. Constitutional Law in Contemporary America. 2 vols. 3 editions (1st edition, 2010, Oxford University Press; 2nd edition, 2017, West Academic Publishing; 3rd edition, 2026, Cambridge University Press).
