= Scott Walker (politician) =

American politician (born 1967)

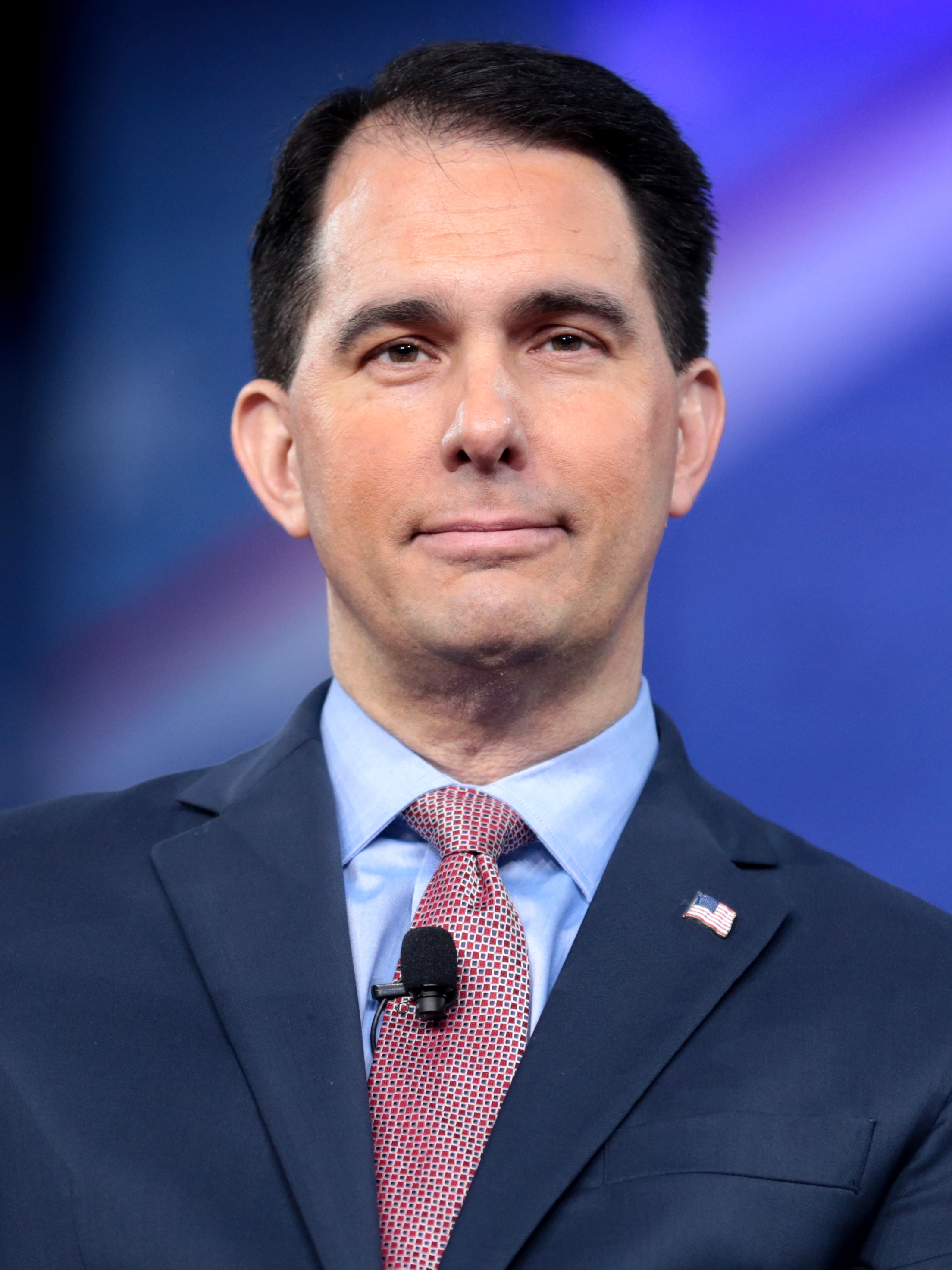
- Walker in 2017

45th Governor of Wisconsin
- In office January 3, 2011 – January 7, 2019
- Lieutenant: Rebecca Kleefisch
- Preceded by: Jim Doyle
- Succeeded by: Tony Evers

Chair of the Republican Governors Association
- In office November 16, 2016 – November 17, 2017
- Preceded by: Susana Martinez
- Succeeded by: Bill Haslam

5th Executive of Milwaukee County
- In office April 30, 2002 – December 27, 2010
- Preceded by: Janine Geske (acting)
- Succeeded by: Lee Holloway (acting)

Member of the Wisconsin State Assembly from the 14th district
- In office June 30, 1993 – April 30, 2002
- Preceded by: Peggy Rosenzweig
- Succeeded by: Leah Vukmir

Personal details
- Born: Scott Kevin Walker; November 2, 1967 (age 58) Colorado Springs, Colorado, U.S.
- Party: Republican
- Spouse: Tonette Tarantino (m. 1993)
- Children: 2
- Education: Marquette University (attended)
- Website: Official website

Scott Kevin Walker (born November 2, 1967) is an American politician who served as the 45th governor of Wisconsin from 2011 to 2019. A member of the Republican Party, he previously served as Milwaukee County executive from 2002 to 2010. He is the most recent Republican to have served as governor of Wisconsin.

Born in Colorado Springs, Colorado, Walker was raised in Plainfield, Iowa, and Delavan, Wisconsin. He was elected to the Wisconsin State Assembly in 1992, representing a district in western Milwaukee County. In 2002, Walker was elected Milwaukee County executive in a special election following the resignation of Tom Ament. He was elected to a full term in 2004 and reelected in 2008. Walker ran for governor in 2006 but withdrew before the primary election. He ran again in 2010 and won, defeating Democrat Tom Barrett.

Shortly after taking office in 2011, Walker gained national attention by introducing the Wisconsin Budget Repair Bill, which significantly limited collective bargaining rights for most Wisconsin public employees. The proposal prompted large protests at the Wisconsin State Capitol, and Democratic state senators temporarily left the state to prevent the bill from being passed. The bill was enacted in March 2011. Opposition to the law led to a recall election in 2012, which Walker won, making him the first incumbent U.S. governor to defeat a recall election; California governor Gavin Newsom later did so in 2021.

Walker was reelected in 2014, defeating Democratic challenger Mary Burke. In 2015, he launched a campaign for the Republican nomination for president but withdrew after two months amid declining poll support. Walker sought a third term as governor in 2018 but was narrowly defeated by Democrat Tony Evers. Since 2021, he has served as president of Young America's Foundation.

== Early life and education ==
Walker was born on November 2, 1967, in Colorado Springs, Colorado, the elder of two sons of Patricia Ann "Pat" (née Fitch; born 1938), a bookkeeper, and Llewellyn Scott "Llew" Walker (1939 – 2018), a Baptist minister.

The family moved to Plainfield, Iowa, in 1970, where Llew worked as pastor in the local Baptist Church, TBC, and served on the municipal council. When Walker was ten years old, the family moved to Delavan, Wisconsin, where his father continued to work as a minister, at the First Baptist Church of Delavan. In 1985, when Walker was in high school, he attended and represented Wisconsin at two weeks of American Legion-sponsored training in leadership and government at Badger Boys State in Wisconsin and Boys Nation in Washington, D.C. While at the event, he met President Ronald Reagan and had a photo taken with him. Walker has credited the experience with solidifying his interest in public service and giving him the "political bug". He attained the highest rank, Eagle Scout, in the Boy Scouts of America, and graduated from Delavan-Darien High School in 1986.

In the fall of 1986, Walker enrolled at Marquette University. Within a few weeks of beginning his collegiate studies, Walker became a student senator and led a committee investigating alleged misuse of funds by student leaders. During the same year, he volunteered for Tommy Thompson's gubernatorial campaign. In 1988, Walker lost a "fiercely-fought" campaign for student government president. Walker led the anti-abortion Students for Life group at Marquette.

Walker discontinued his studies at Marquette in the spring of 1990, having earned 94 of the 128 minimum credits needed to graduate. He left in good standing with a 2.59/4.0 grade point average, but without having obtained a degree. Walker has said that he dropped out of college when he received a full-time job offer from the American Red Cross.

== Early political career ==
=== Wisconsin State Assembly ===
In 1990, at age 22, Walker ran for Milwaukee's 7th District seat in the Wisconsin State Assembly. He won the Republican nomination, but lost in the general election to incumbent Democrat Gwen Moore, receiving less than one-third of the vote. In 1993, Walker moved to Wauwatosa, a suburb of Milwaukee, and ran in a special election in the more conservative 14th legislative district, based around Wauwatosa. He defeated Democrat Chris Ament, son of then-Milwaukee County Executive Tom Ament.

During the campaign, Walker backed welfare reform and opposed the expansion of mass transit. He supported a cap on state spending and said that the law on resolving labor disputes with local government employees needed to be reformed. Walker received the endorsements of Wisconsin Right to Life and The Milwaukee Sentinel, which called him a fiscal conservative and noted his anti-abortion, tough-on-crime, and pro-welfare reform positions. He was re-elected four times, serving until 2002 when he became a county executive.

While in the Assembly, Walker was interested in criminal justice matters and chaired the Committees on Correctional Facilities, and Corrections and the Courts. Over the years, he served on a number of other committees, including Health, Census and Redistricting, Financial Institutions, and Housing. As a freshman legislator in 1993, he co-sponsored right-to-work legislation. In 1999 he advocated for a truth-in-sentencing bill that increased prison time for some crimes and eliminated parole for others. Walker was a member of the American Legislative Exchange Council (ALEC) at the time, and credited the organization for much of the success of the legislation.

In 2001, he sponsored a bill to prevent pharmacists from being disciplined for refusing to fill prescriptions for emergency contraception and was a supporter of a bill to require voters to show photo ID at the polls. According to research by two political analysts, Walker was more conservative than about 90% of his peers in the assembly and about 80% of the Republicans in the assembly.

Walker had a pro-life record in the Assembly. With the exception of some bills while Walker was running for Milwaukee County Executive, Walker either sponsored or cosponsored all but three bills that would have restricted abortions.

In 2001–02, Walker and fellow Assemblymember Michael Huebsch objected to the hiring of a state employee, Rev. Jamyi Witch, on the basis of her religious beliefs as a Wiccan. Walker claimed that Witch's hiring as a prison chaplain raised "both personal and political concerns" because she "practice[d] a religion that actually offends people of many other faiths". Walker and Huebsch were ultimately unsuccessful in terminating Witch's chaplaincy or employment.

=== Milwaukee County Executive ===
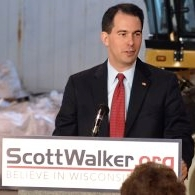
Walker in 2009

Walker became Milwaukee County Executive in a special election run in April 2002, after the former County Executive, Tom Ament, resigned in the wake of a county pension-fund scandal. Walker was elected to a four-year term in 2004, winning 57% of the vote to defeat former state budget director, David Riemer. Although in a liberal county and running for a nonpartisan position, Walker ran openly as a conservative Republican. He won another four-year term in 2008, defeating State Senator Lena Taylor with 59% of the vote. Upon first being elected, Walker became the youngest person and the first Republican ever elected to the position and remains the only Republican to hold this office to date.

Walker won the office on a platform of fiscal conservatism, promising to give back part of his own salary. He said that his voluntary give-back gave him moral authority to make cuts in the budget. He returned $60,000 per year (slightly less than half of his salary) during his first term, and reduced his give-back to $10,000 per year during his second term.

During his eight years in office, there were disputes with the county board "over taxes, privatization of public services, quality of parks and public buildings, and delivery of social services", according to the Milwaukee Journal Sentinel. The County Board approved several budgets over Walker's veto and he never submitted a budget with a higher property tax than the board had approved the prior year. During Walker's tenure the number of county employees was reduced by over 20% and the $3.5 million county deficit was turned into a surplus. In addition, he cut over $44 million in proposed spending through his veto powers and helped eliminate the waiting list for long-term care for senior citizens.

==== Operation Freedom investigation ====
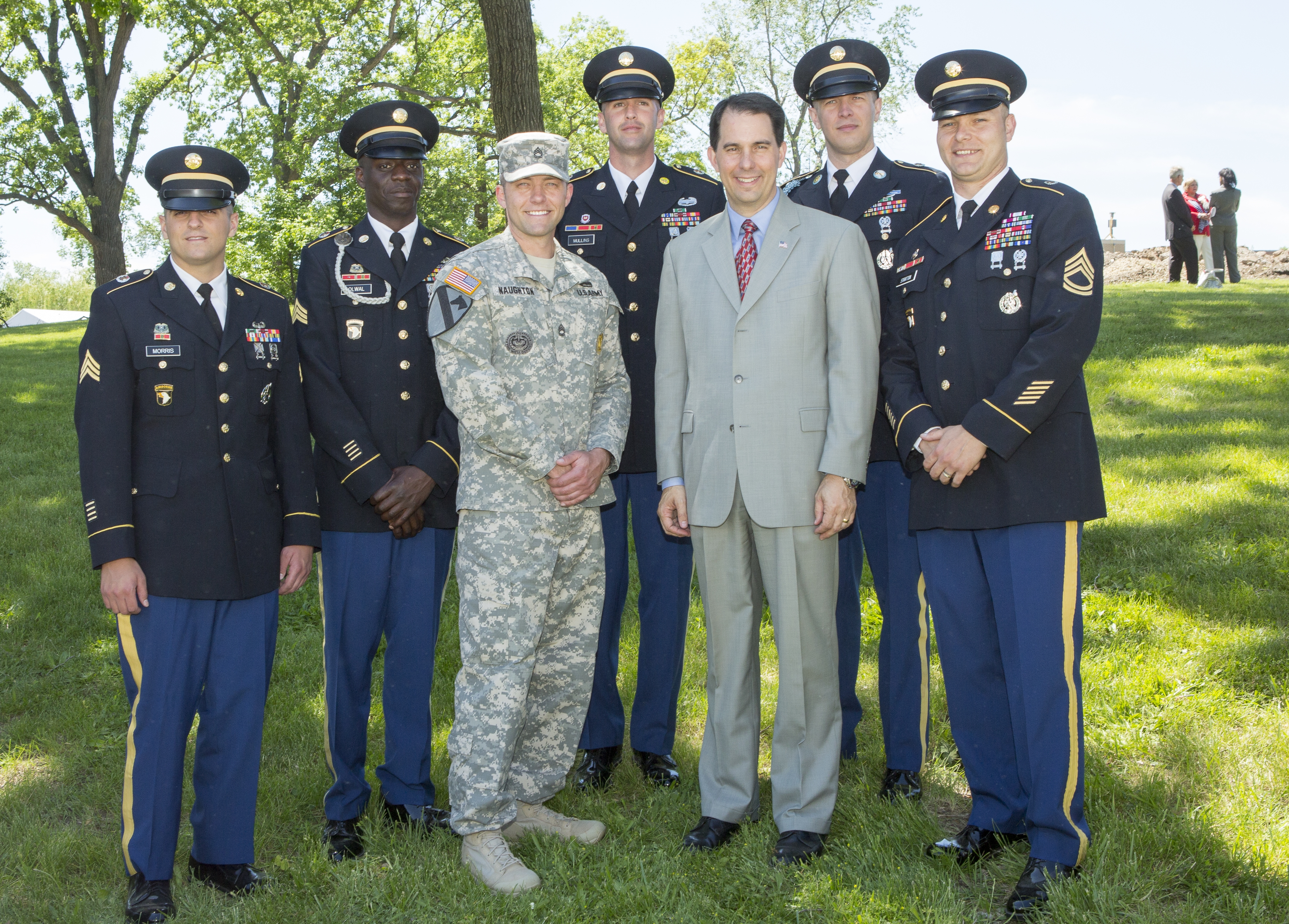
Governor Walker at the Milwaukee Veterans Affairs Medical Center

Walker appointed Kevin Kavanaugh, treasurer of the local chapter of the Military Order of the Purple Heart, as a member of the County Veterans Service Commission. Walker raised funds annually for veterans at the Operation Freedom Benefit, with proceeds to the Military Order of the Purple Heart.

Walker's Chief of Staff, Thomas Nardelli, indicated that he went to Walker with concerns about missing money in 2009, and Walker directed him to report it to the district attorney's office. The district attorney did not immediately act but later launched a "John Doe" investigation. Kavanaugh and four others were arrested for theft of funds. Kavanaugh was convicted and sentenced to 21 months in prison.

Tim Russell, employed by Walker in a number of posts, was implicated in the same investigation; he was charged in January 2012 and pleaded guilty in November 2012 to diverting more than $21,000 to his personal bank account. In 2010, Walker's last year as Milwaukee County executive, Russell was his deputy chief of staff and Milwaukee Housing Director. Walker was not charged with any wrongdoing.

== Governor of Wisconsin ==
=== Elections ===
==== 2006 gubernatorial campaign ====
While county executive, Walker became a candidate, in February 2005, in the 2006 race for Wisconsin governor. He dropped out on March 24, 2006, after about 14 months of campaigning, citing fundraising difficulties. Walker threw his support to fellow Republican Mark Andrew Green, who won the Republican primary unopposed, and Walker actively campaigned for him during the general election. Green lost the general election, in November 2006, to the incumbent Democrat, Jim Doyle. Despite Green's loss, Walker's strong support for him helped increase Walker's favorability with the state GOP and positioned him as the frontrunner for the 2010 election.

==== 2010 gubernatorial campaign ====
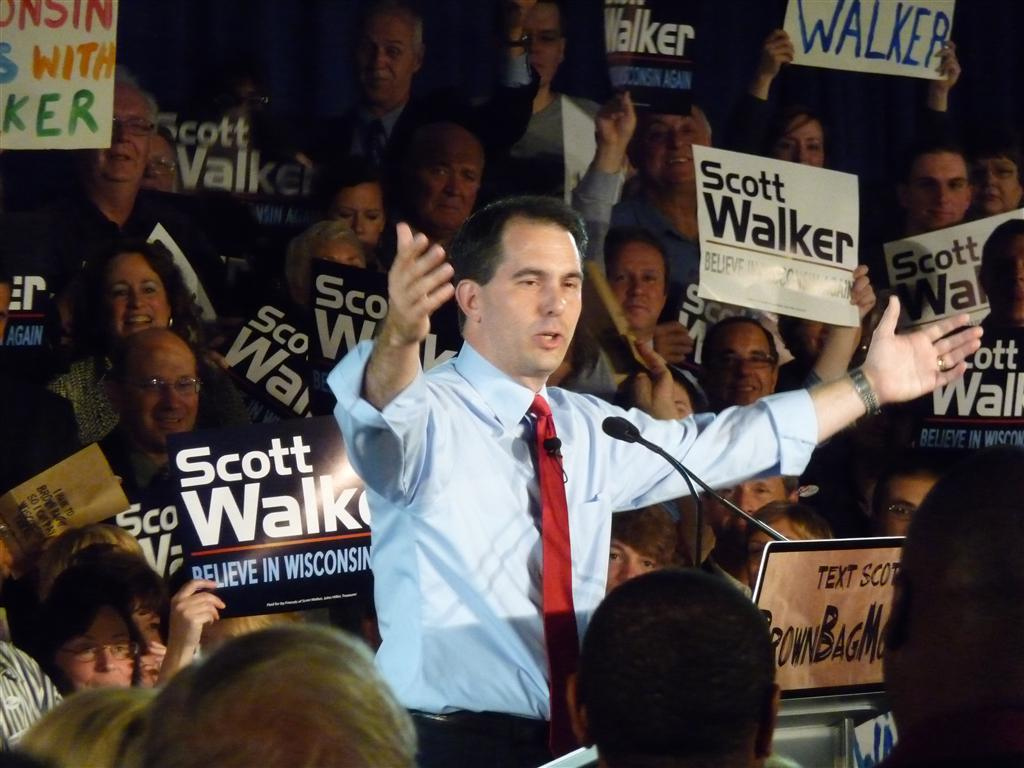
Walker after winning the 2010 Republican gubernatorial primary

Walker was an early favorite for the 2010 Republican Party endorsement for Wisconsin governor, winning straw polls of Wisconsin GOP convention attendees in 2007 and 2008. He announced his candidacy in late April 2009 after several months of previewing his campaign themes of reduced taxes and reduced spending to Republican audiences around the state. He criticized the 2009–2011 Wisconsin state budget as too big given the slow economy. In 2009 and 2010, Americans for Prosperity helped raise Walker's statewide profile, inviting him to address its events and rallies throughout the state. Walker won the Wisconsin GOP convention endorsement on May 22, 2010, receiving 91% of the votes cast by delegates. He won the Republican nomination in the primary election of September 14, 2010, receiving 59% of the popular vote, while former U.S. Representative Mark Neumann garnered 39%.

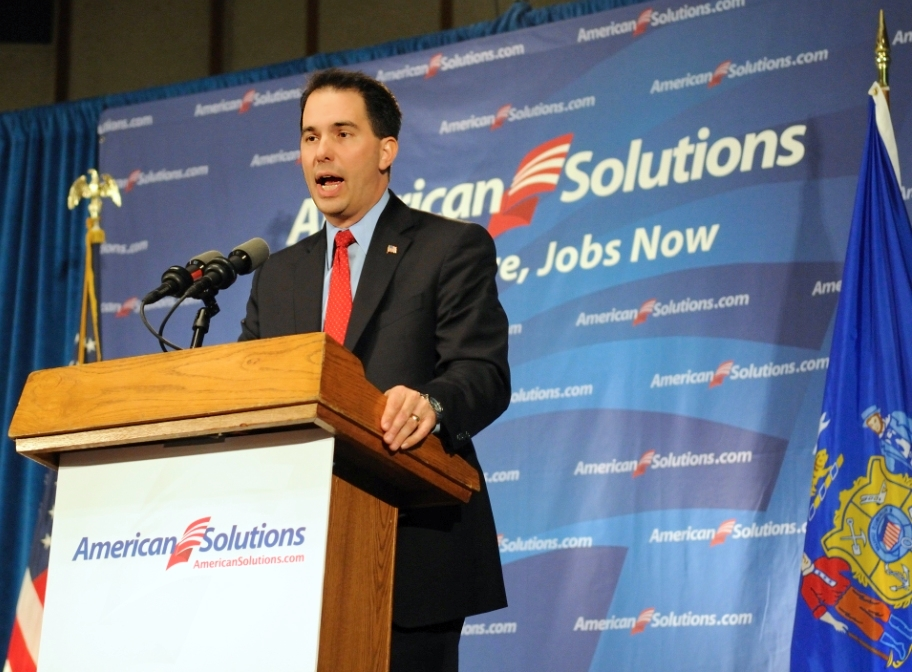
Walker speaks before the gubernatorial election

As part of his campaign platform, Walker said he would create 250,000 jobs in his first term through a program that would include tax cuts for small businesses, capital gains tax cuts, and income tax cuts. He proposed cutting state employee wages and benefits to help pay for these tax cuts. Critics argued that his proposals would help only the wealthy and that cutting the salaries of public employees would adversely affect state services, while supporters argued that tax cuts for businesses would spur the economy and create jobs.

Walker indicated he would refuse an $810 million award from the federal Department of Transportation to build a high speed railroad line from Madison to Milwaukee as he believed it would cost the state $7.5 million per year to operate and would not prove profitable. This was in spite of offers by the mayor of Madison and the Dane County executive to help absorb costs the state might have incurred. The award was later rescinded and split among other states. This cost the state at least $60 million for rail repairs federal funds would have covered.

Social issues played a part in the campaign. Walker has stated that he is "100% pro-life" and that he believes life should be protected from conception to natural death. He opposes abortion, including in cases of rape and incest. He supports abstinence-only sex education in the public schools and opposes state supported clinical services that provide birth control and testing and treatment of sexually transmitted diseases to teens under age 18 without parental consent. He supports the right of pharmacists to refuse to fill prescriptions for contraceptives on religious or moral grounds. He supports adult stem cell research but opposes human embryonic stem cell research.

As an opponent of same-sex marriage, he opposed a law that allowed gay couples to register with counties to get certain benefits, such as hospital visitation rights. He later stated that his position on same-sex marriage was no longer relevant because Wisconsin's ban on same-sex marriage had been overturned by a federal court. Walker said he would sign an Arizona-style immigration bill, which would allow local police to stop suspected illegal immigrants, if he were elected.

On November 2, 2010, his 43rd birthday, Walker won the general election with 52% of total votes cast, while Democrat Tom Barrett received 46%. His running mate was Rebecca Kleefisch, a former Milwaukee television news reporter. Walker's victory came amid a series of Wisconsin GOP victories, with conservative Republican Ron Johnson winning the contested U.S. Senate seat, and with the GOP gaining majorities in the state's U.S. House delegation, State Assembly, and State Senate.

2010 election for Governor of Wisconsin
Party	Candidate	Votes	%
Republican	Scott Walker	1,128,941	52.3
Democratic	Tom Barrett	1,004,303	46.5

==== 2012 recall election ====
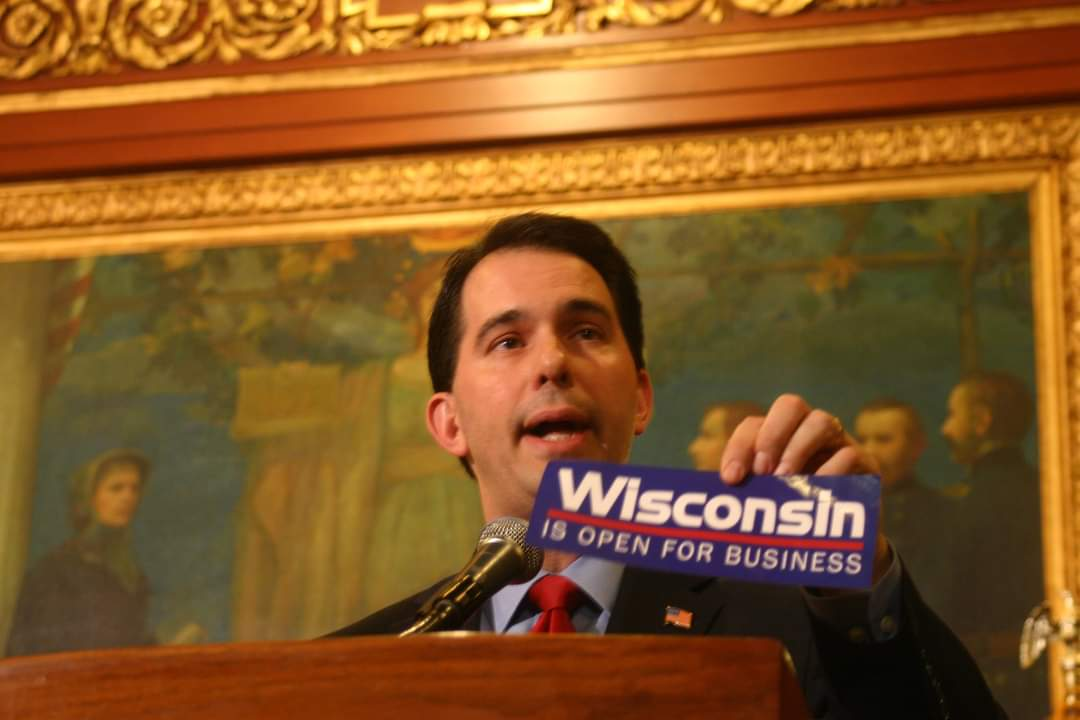
Governor Walker during a press conference during the Act 10 protests

After the contentious collective bargaining dispute, Walker's disapproval ratings varied between 50% and 51% while his approval ratings varied between 47% and 49% in 2011. The effort to recall Walker officially began on November 15, 2011.

Walker reportedly raised more than $30 million during the recall effort, with a significant portion from out of state. Commentators claimed the amount of money raised was "illustrating the national significance both political parties saw in the recall fight". In March 2012, the Wisconsin Government Accountability Board announced there were more than 900,000 valid signatures to force a recall vote, well above the required minimum of 540,208.

In February 2012, Walker's campaign requested additional time for the petition signatures to be verified, claiming about 20% of the signatures were not valid. Democrats argued that even if 20% of the signatures were disregarded they still had obtained 180,000 more signatures than required to initiate the recall. Wisconsin Democratic Party Communications Director Graeme Zielinski claimed Walker was "delaying the inevitable". On February 17, 2012, Dane County Judge Richard Niess, who had signed the recall petition, denied Walker's request for additional time. On March 30, 2012, the Government Accountability Board unanimously ruled in favor of the recall election. The recall elections for both Walker and Kleefisch took place on June 5, 2012.

During the Republican primary election for the recall, Walker received 626,538 votes. In the Democratic primary, all of the Democratic candidates combined received 670,288, with the winner, Tom Barrett, receiving 390,109, a majority. On June 5, 2012, Walker won the recall election. This was only the third gubernatorial recall election in U.S. history. Walker won the recall, his second face-off with Barrett, by a slightly larger margin (53% to 46%) than in the 2010 election (52% to 46%) and became the first U.S. governor to win a recall election.

By the end of the recall election, Walker had a national network of conservative donors and groups supporting him. Nearly 300,000 people donated to his recall campaign, which garnered roughly $37 million. Two-thirds of the contributions came from outside Wisconsin. Walker, or the conservative causes he supports, are also supported by conservative donors and groups including Michael W. Grebe, Diane Hendricks, and the Bradley Foundation, founder of the Wisconsin Policy Research Institute and the MacIver Institute; and David H. Koch and Charles Koch, initial funders of Americans for Prosperity.

==== 2014 gubernatorial campaign ====
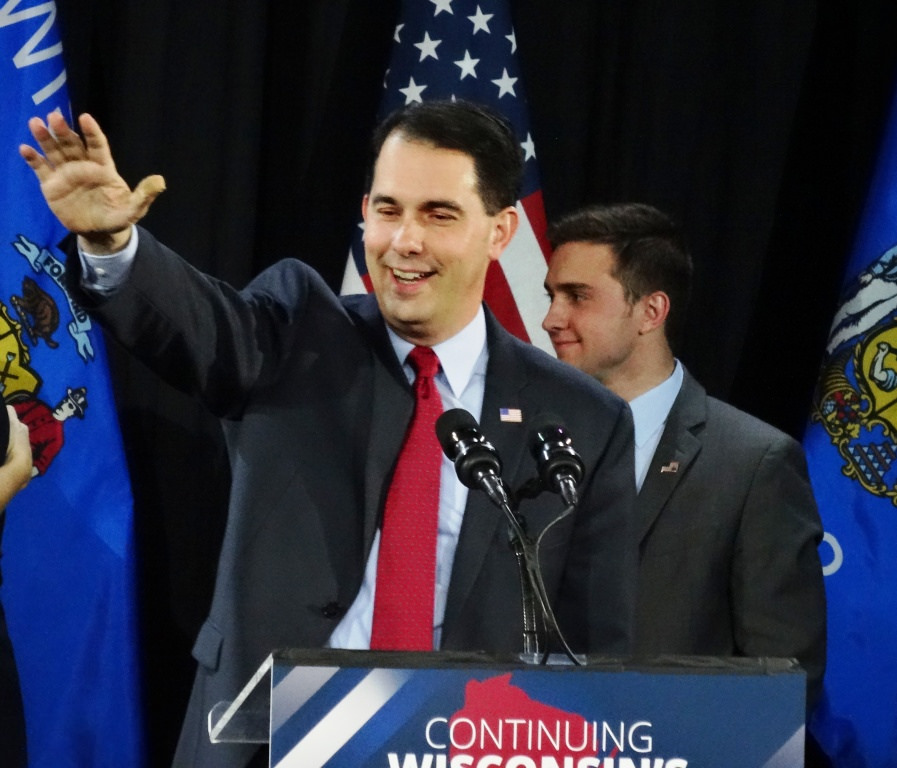
Walker after winning re-election as governor of Wisconsin in 2014

In his third election in four years, Walker faced Democrat Mary Burke to determine the governor of Wisconsin. Wisconsin labor unions, who helped organize the 2012 Wisconsin recall election, donated funds to boost Burke's campaign. Walker received help from a number of conservative donors. The polling through most of the race was close and no candidate was a definitive favorite. The gubernatorial election took place on November 4, 2014, and Walker won re-election 52.3% to 46.6%.

==== 2018 gubernatorial campaign ====
Walker sought a third term in the 2018 elections. His opponent, Democratic Wisconsin Superintendent of Public Instruction Tony Evers, defeated him in the election 49.5% to 48.4%.

=== Tenure ===
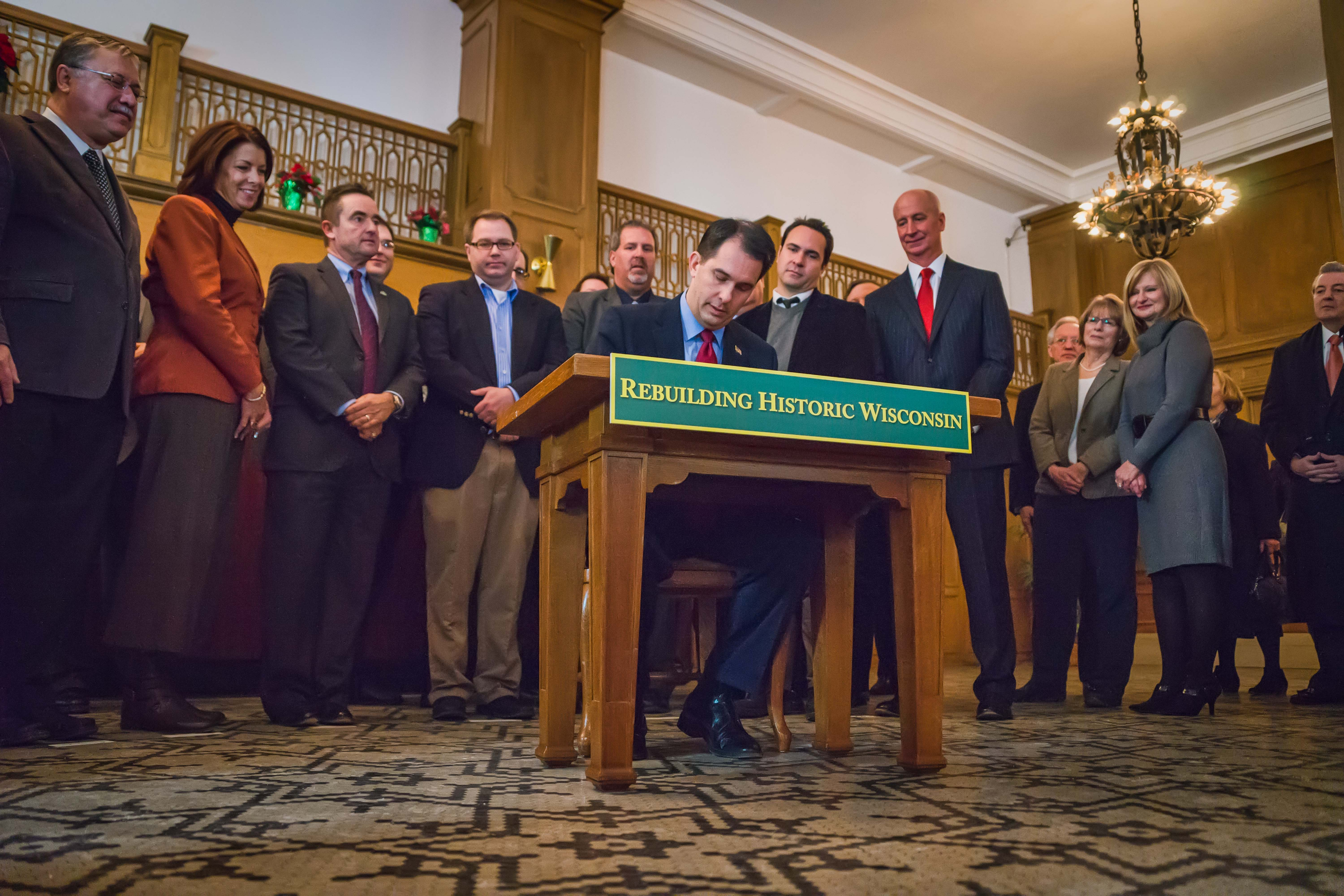
Walker signing Historic Tax Credit Bill December 11, 2013 at Hotel Northland

Walker took the oath of office to become the 45th Governor of Wisconsin on January 3, 2011. By January 25, 2011, the state legislature passed a series of Walker-backed bills, the largest of which would cut taxes for businesses at "a two-year cost of $67 million", according to the Associated Press.

Walker became a figure of national recognition and controversy after he proposed the "Wisconsin budget repair bill" in 2011. The bill, which would eventually be passed by the Wisconsin Legislature, significantly changed the collective bargaining process for most public employees in Wisconsin. Opponents of Walker's actions launched a push for a recall election and received enough support to force an election on June 5, 2012, the first time a Governor of Wisconsin had ever faced recall.

During Walker's first term as governor, the state's $3.6 billion budget deficit was turned into a surplus and taxes were cut by $2 billion. More than 100,000 jobs were created in the state of Wisconsin.

==== 2011 Budget Repair Bill ====
Walker proposed the Wisconsin Budget Repair Bill on February 11, 2011, estimated to save Wisconsin $30 million in the current fiscal year and $300 million over the next two years. The bill requires additional contributions by state and local government workers to their health care plans and pensions, amounting to roughly an 8% decrease in the average government worker's take home pay. The bill eliminated, for most state workers, other than certain public safety workers, many collective bargaining rights aside from seeking pay increases, and then not above the rate of inflation, unless approved by a voter referendum. Under the bill, unions have to win yearly votes to continue representing government workers and could no longer have dues automatically deducted from government workers' paychecks. Certain law enforcement personnel and firefighters are exempt from the bargaining changes.

On January 18, 2011, days after Walker's inauguration, Beloit businesswoman and Walker supporter Diane Hendricks asked him, "Any chance we'll ever get to be a completely red state and work on these unions and become a right-to-work (state)?", and he replied:

Well, we're going to start in a couple weeks with our budget adjustment bill. The first step is, we're going to deal with collective bargaining for all public employee unions, because you use divide and conquer. So for us the base we've got for that is the fact that we've got – budgetarily we can't afford not to. If we have collective bargaining agreements in place, there's no way not only the state but local governments can balance things out. So you think city of Beloit, city of Janesville, any of the school districts, that opens the door once we do that. That's your bigger problem right there.

After videotape of the interaction was released in May 2012, Walker's opponents said Walker had revealed his intention to target private sector unions and pursue right-to-work legislation. Walker said he was not pursuing right-to-work legislation and that in his 2011 comment to Hendricks he was referring to his responsibility as governor to defend taxpayers from unions that he believed were frustrating resolution of the state's budget deficit.

In announcing the proposed legislation, Walker said the Wisconsin National Guard and other state agencies were prepared to prevent disruptions in state services. He later explained that police and firefighters were excluded from the changes because he would not jeopardize public safety. Walker stated that the bill was necessary to avoid laying off thousands of state employees and that no one should be surprised by its provisions. Union leaders and Democratic legislators immediately criticized the bill, claiming Walker had never campaigned on doing away with collective bargaining rights. In a media interview a week later, Walker said he was not trying to break the public sector unions, noting that Wisconsin government employees would retain the protections of civil service laws. He said that asking employees to pay half the national average for health care benefits was a modest request. Demonstrators began protesting the proposed bill on February 14, 2011. During the sixth day of the protests, leaders of the two largest unions said publicly they were prepared to accept the financial concessions in the bill, but would not agree to the limitations of collective bargaining rights.

On February 17, 2011, all 14 Democratic state senators traveled to Illinois to prevent the passage of the bill by depriving the Senate of the quorum necessary for a vote. The missing legislators said they would not return to Madison unless Walker agreed to remove the limitations on collective bargaining from the bill. Walker warned that if the budget repair bill was not passed by March 1, refinancing of a $165 million state debt would fail, and more cuts would be needed to balance the budget.

By February 20, protestors had undertaken a physical occupation of the Capitol building. Protestors also covered the walls of the Capitol with thousands of homemade signs. On February 20, a union organizer participating in the protests said that the protests would continue "as long as it takes." Other union leaders called for teachers to return to work. On February 26, between 70,000 and 100,000 protested the bill in Madison. They were joined by thousands at state capitals around the nation.

Appearing on Meet the Press on February 27, Walker stated that he did not believe the unions were negotiating in good faith in offering pension and health-care concessions because local unions had recently pushed through contracts with school boards and city councils that did not include contributions to the pensions and health care and that, in one case, a contract even included a pay increase. On February 28, the largest public union filed an unfair labor practices complaint with the state labor relations board, claiming that Walker had a duty to negotiate, but had refused. On March 8, private emails dating back to February 28 were released. These emails showed that Governor Walker had tried to negotiate with Democratic legislators, even proposing to allow some collective bargaining rights.

After failing to reach a compromise with Democratic legislators, the Republican-led Senate removed certain fiscal provisions from the bill, allowing it to be passed without the usual quorum requirement. On March 9, 2011, the Wisconsin Senate voted 18–1 to pass the legislation; Senate Democrats remained out of state and did not participate in the vote. The Wisconsin Assembly passed the bill one day later by a vote of 53–42. After the Assembly passed the bill, Walker released a statement in which he "applaud[ed] all members of the Assembly for showing up, debating the legislation and participating in democracy". Walker signed the Wisconsin Budget Repair Bill into law on March 11, 2011. On March 12, the fourteen Democratic senators who had left the state returned.

The Budget Repair Law was challenged in court. On March 18, Judge Maryann Sumi issued a court order to prohibit publication of the bill by the Secretary of State while legal challenges to it were being considered. On March 26, the Legislative Reference Bureau (LRB) published the bill. Sumi subsequently clarified that, pursuant to her order, the bill could not be considered to be published until the court challenge was resolved. On May 26, Judge Sumi struck down the law, finding that its passage violated state open meetings laws. The Wisconsin Supreme Court reversed Sumi's ruling and upheld the law on June 14, 2011.

Walker claimed that the Budget Repair Law would "save jobs, protect taxpayers, reform government and help balance the budget." He added, "You see, despite a lot of the rhetoric we've heard over the past 11 days the bill I put forward isn't aimed at state workers, and it certainly isn't a battle with unions. If it was, we would have eliminated collective bargaining entirely or we would have gone after the private-sector unions." As part of the cost savings resulting from the changes to collective bargaining, Walker pointed to significant reductions in the premiums for health insurance for many school districts. Prior to the deficit reduction bill, WEA Trust, which is affiliated with Wisconsin's largest teachers union, dominated the market for health insurance for the state's school districts. The changes to collective bargaining made it easier for school districts to change health insurance providers and negotiate better premiums. Walker claimed that Wisconsin school districts have saved an estimated $30 million as a result of the change.

===== John Doe campaign finance investigation =====
In August 2012, the first investigation, which had been launched by John Chisholm, Milwaukee County District Attorney, a Democrat, into missing funds, was rolled into a second John Doe probe based on a theory that Governor Walker's campaign had illegally coordinated with conservative groups engaged in issue advocacy during the recall elections.

The initial John Doe judge, retired Kenosha County Circuit Judge Barbara A. Kluka, overseeing the John Doe investigation issued 30 subpoenas and 5 search warrants. She also issued a secrecy order which meant those being investigated were legally bound from discussing any facet of the investigation publicly. On October 29, 2013, she recused herself from the investigation without explanation. Kluka's replacement, Judge Gregory Peterson, quashed several subpoenas in January 2014, saying "there was no probable cause shown that they violated campaign finance laws".

On July 16, 2015, the Wisconsin Supreme Court ruled 4–2 that Walker did not illegally collaborate with conservative groups during the recall campaigns. Writing for the majority in the case, Justice Michael Gableman stated: "To be clear, this conclusion ends the John Doe investigation because the special prosecutor's legal theory is unsupported in either reason or law," he said, "Consequently, the investigation is closed." In March 2017, a federal judge dismissed a lawsuit filed against the investigators of the case.

==== 2011–2013 budget proposal ====
Wisconsin faced an anticipated deficit of approximately $3.6 billion in the 2012–2013 budget cycle which must be balanced according to state law. Walker's proposed budget cut $834 million in state aid for K–12 education, which would be a 7.9% reduction from the prior budget. He proposed a 5.5% decrease in the maximum amount of funding school districts can receive from state aid and property taxes, which would limit how much property taxes could be increased to compensate for the reduction in state aid. The budget lowered state capital gains taxes for investments in Wisconsin businesses. It increased spending on health care by $1.3 billion to cover increased costs for Medicaid, and increased transportation funding by $410.5 million.

==== 2013–2015 budget proposal ====
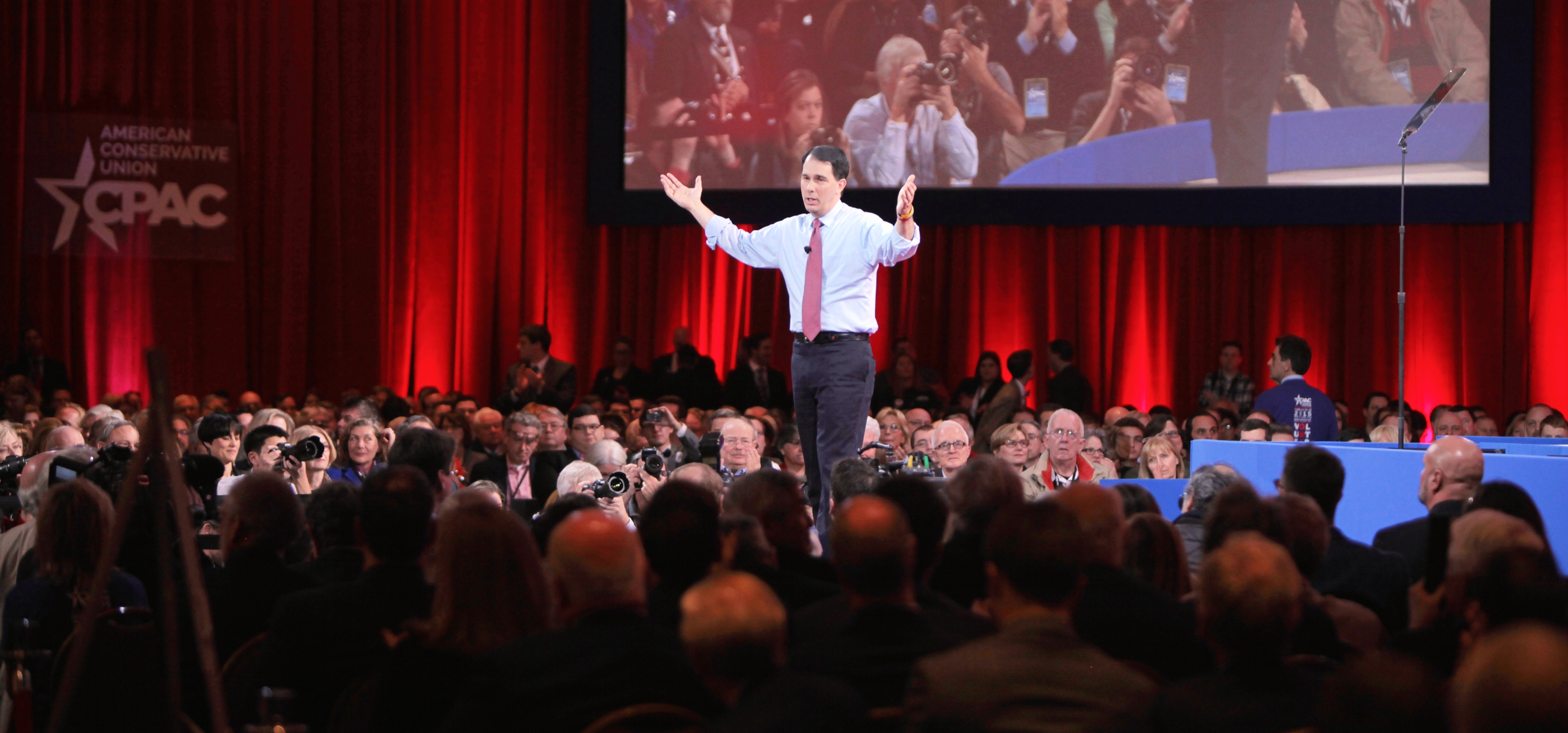
Walker speaking at the 2015 Conservative Political Action Conference

Walker's proposed budget for fiscal 2013–2015 froze spending on public schools and tightened the income requirements for Medicaid recipients. It proposed an increase in funding for fighting domestic violence, mental health care, higher education, and job training. It also included a $343 million cut in income taxes and an expansion of the state's school voucher program.

==== 2015–2017 budget proposal ====
Walker's proposed budget for fiscal 2015–2017 included a $300 million cut to the University of Wisconsin System, while holding funding flat for K–12 public schools and continuing to expand the school voucher program. It included a plan to borrow $1.3 billion to fund improvements to roads and infrastructure, and proposed drug testing for recipients of public benefits like Medicaid and food stamps.

==== Domestic partner registry defense ====
On May 13, 2011, the Walker administration petitioned the Dane County Circuit Court for permission to withdraw the state as a defendant from Appling v. Doyle, which was a challenge to the state's domestic partner registry.

==== Regulatory reform bill ====
On May 23, 2011, Walker signed legislation changing the process of creating administrative rules for the state. This measure, which became 2011 Wisconsin Act 21 (and became effective June 8, 2011), changes State agency authority to promulgate rules, provides for gubernatorial approval of proposed rules, revised the requirement of an economic impact analysis for proposed rules and changes venue in the process of judicial review of agency rules.

==== Voter ID law ====
On May 25, 2011, Walker signed a voter ID law that required voters to show a government-issued ID before casting a ballot.

The ACLU filed a lawsuit in federal court to invalidate the law on December 13, 2011, claiming the law violates the constitutional guarantee of equal protection under the law. On April 29, 2014, U.S. District Judge Lynn Adelman struck down the law, saying it violated the Voting Rights Act and U.S. Constitution.

The Wisconsin Supreme Court upheld the constitutionality of the voter ID law under the Constitution of Wisconsin in two other cases in July 2014. On September 12, the 7th Circuit Court of Appeals allowed the law to be put into effect just 54 days before the 2014 elections, overturning a previous ruling in federal court.

On October 9, 2014, the state was again barred from implementing the voter ID law for 2014 by the U.S. Supreme Court. On March 23, 2015, the Supreme Court denied writ of certiorari, thus ruling in favor of the state of Wisconsin's new stricter voter ID law.

==== Rejection of health care funds ====
In January 2012, Walker returned a $37.6 million federal grant meant to set up a health exchange in Wisconsin for the Patient Protection and Affordable Care Act. Walker said "Stopping the encroachment of Obamacare in our state, which has the potential to have a devastating impact on Wisconsin's economy, is a top priority." Walker rejected an $11 million federal grant designed to improve Medicaid enrollment systems. It can take up to 3 months to determine whether an applicant qualifies for the program. If the applicant does not qualify, the state must pay the medical costs for the first three months. The Walker administration previously said it wants to end the practice of presuming some applicants are eligible and go to a real-time system for determining eligibility. Walker rejected an expansion of Medicaid coverage for the state, but instead reduced the eligibility requirements for the state's BadgerCare program.

==== Education ====
On April 2, 2012, Walker signed a law to fund evaluation of the reading skills of kindergartners as part of an initiative to ensure that students are reading at or above grade level by 3rd grade. The law also created a system for evaluating teachers and principals based in part on the performance of their students. It specified that student performance metrics must be based on objective measures, including their performance on standardized tests.

Walker approved a two-year freeze of tuition at the University of Wisconsin System in the 2013 budget. In 2014, he proposed a two-year extension of the freeze based on expected cash balances for the system in excess of $1 billion.

On February 3, 2015, Walker delivered a budget proposal to the Wisconsin Legislature, in which he recommended placing the University of Wisconsin System under the direction of a "private authority", governed by the Board of Regents (all the governor's appointees). The budget proposal called for a 13% reduction in state funding for the university system.

The budget proposal also called for re-writing the Wisconsin Idea, replacing the university's fundamental commitment to the "search for truth" with the goal of workforce readiness. Walker faced broad criticism for the changes and at first blamed the rewriting of the Wisconsin Idea on a "drafting error." Politifact and the Milwaukee Journal Sentinel later reported that Walker's administration had insisted to University of Wisconsin officials on scrapping the Wisconsin Idea, the guiding principle for the state's universities for more than a century. Walker then acknowledged that UW System officials had raised objections about the proposal and had been told the changes were not open to debate.

==== Indian gaming ====
Section 20(b)(1)(A) of the Indian Gaming Regulatory Act (IGRA) gives governors unrestricted authority to approve or veto any off-reservation tribal casino located in their state.

Walker has said he would only approve new off-reservation casino projects if they are supported by every tribe in the state. This has been referred to as the "Walker Rule". In January 2015, Walker rejected a proposed casino in Kenosha, Wisconsin.

==== Mental health ====
Walker signed a 2013–2015 state budget and subsequent law that established the Wisconsin Office of Children's Mental Health. In 2016, Walker signed legislation creating a pair of pilot programs to test alternative-care delivery and payment models for Medicaid recipients who have significant or chronic mental illness. In 2017, Walker expanded Wisconsin's mental health provider rates by $17 million. Walker also signed legislation increasing funding for peer-run respite centers.

Following the Slender Man stabbing months earlier, Walker issued a proclamation declaring Wednesday, August 13, 2014, "Purple Hearts for Healing Day", and encouraged the people of Wisconsin to wear purple to honor the victim of the stabbing. He also praised the "strength and determination" exhibited by the victim during her recovery.

==== Abortion ====
Walker signed the 2011 state budget that de-funded Planned Parenthood. In 2013, Walker signed a bill that requires women seeking abortions to undergo an ultrasound and doctors to show the patients the image of the fetus.

In 2013, Walker signed a bill requiring abortion providers in Wisconsin to have admitting privileges at a hospital within 30 miles. The law was found unconstitutional by the Seventh Circuit Court of Appeals in 2015. The court found the medical justifications for such restrictions "nonexistent" and said they "cannot be taken seriously as a measure to improve women's health." In June 2016, the Supreme Court of the United States ruled on Whole Woman's Health v. Hellerstedt, and struck down admitting privileges and other similar restrictions, finding that they were an unconstitutional "undue burden" on women. The day after delivering this decision, the Court refused to hear the Walker administration's appeal of the Seventh Circuit decision, leaving its finding of unconstitutionality in place. Walker blamed an "activist court" for finding his law unconstitutional.

On July 20, 2015, Walker signed a bill into law that banned all abortions after the 20th week of pregnancy, "except when the life of the mother is in immediate danger."

=== Right to work legislation ===
In 2012, regarding right-to-work legislation, Walker told reporters at the state Republican Party convention that "It's not going to get to my desk. ... I'm going to do everything in my power to make sure it isn't there because my focal point (is) private sector unions have overwhelmingly come to the table to be my partner in economic development." While campaigning for re-election in 2014, Walker again said he had no plans to pursue right-to-work legislation focused on private unions.

Once the legislation was initiated in the state legislature, Walker stated: "I haven't changed my position on it, it just wasn't a priority for me. But should they pass it within the next two weeks, which is their target, I plan on signing it." On March 9, 2015, Walker signed legislation making Wisconsin a right-to-work state. The law applied to private employee unions as well as public. Once signed, Walker claimed partial credit for the right-to-work law. Politifact.com rated Walker's position on right-to-work as a "major reversal of position."

Three trade unions, including the AFL–CIO, subsequently sued to get the law overturned as unconstitutional. In March 2015, the court declined the unions' request to put the law on hold until the lawsuit is settled. Following a protracted legal battle, in 2017 the U.S. appeals court in Chicago upheld Wisconsin's right-to-work law ending the substantive legal challenges to the law.

=== WEDC ===
In 2011, the WEDC was created by Walker as a quasi-public entity to replace the state's Department of Commerce with the objective of incenting job creation in Wisconsin. A 2013 report from the state's Legislative Audit Committee indicated that the organization gave some "grants, loans, and tax credits to ineligible recipients, for ineligible projects, and for amounts that exceeded specified limits." It also reported that WEDC "did not consistently perform statutorily required program oversight duties such as monitoring the contractually specified performance of award recipients". According to Wisconsin Public Radio, "The agency has been plagued by mismanagement and questions about handing out loans without properly vetting recipients."

In June 2015, it was reported that under Walker, WEDC gave out $124 million between the years 2011 and 2013 without formal review. Based on the 27 awards during that period, 2,100 jobs had been created to date out of a total expected of 6,100. $62.5 million was awarded to Kohl's to create 3,000 jobs as part of a headquarters expansion but only 473 had been created, $18 million was awarded to Kestrel Aircraft which was supposed to create 665 jobs but only created 24, and $15 million went to Plexus Corp. to create 350 jobs, but created zero. In July 2013, WEDC adopted a new policy requiring written reviews on all program awards. According to WEDC, it had approved more than 760 reviewed awards under the new policy by June 2015.

Walker introduced a state budget in February 2015 which removed all of the elected officials from the board. This included removing himself from chairmanship of WEDC. This was revised by the Legislature's budget committee who altered it to only remove Walker. Walker signed the budget in July 2015.

=== Foxconn agreement ===
Walker approved an agreement with the Taiwanese manufacturer Foxconn to set up a plant in Mount Pleasant, Wisconsin. As part of the agreement, Foxconn was set to receive subsidies ranging from $3 billion to $4.8 billion (paid in increments if Foxconn met certain targets), which would be by far the largest subsidy ever given to a foreign firm in U.S. history. Foxconn said in return that it would set up a $10 billion factory that initially employed 3,000 (set to increase to 13,000). Numerous economists expressed skepticism that the benefits would exceed the costs of the deal. The nonpartisan Wisconsin's Legislative Fiscal Bureau estimated that the Foxconn plant would not break even on the investment until 2043, and that was in the best-case scenario. Others noted that Foxconn had previously made similar unfulfilled claims about job creation in various localities.

Foxconn sought to locate a plant in the Great Lakes region, because it needs access to large amounts of water. The other Great Lakes states were not willing to offer as generous subsidies as Wisconsin.

Initially, the subsidies were set at $3 billion, which would have cost the state $231,000 per job created (under the assumption of 13,000 jobs). The cost of the subsidies were higher than yearly state funding for the University of Wisconsin System and the state prisons. Other estimates of the subsidies go as high as $4.8 billion, which meant that the cost of the subsidy per job (assuming 13,000 jobs) was more than $346,000. Depending on how many jobs are created, the cost per job may go as high as more than a million dollars.

Walker exempted the firm from Wisconsin's environmental rules regarding wetlands and streams. Walker and the Trump administration rolled back air pollution limits in the area of the plant, overruling objections of Environmental Protection Agency staff. The plant was estimated to contribute significantly to air pollution in the region. Environmentalists criticized the decision to allow Foxconn to draw 7 million gallons of water per day from Lake Michigan. The roughly four square miles of land necessary for the Foxconn campus was in part made possible by forcing homeowners to sell at a fixed price under the threat of seizing the land under eminent domain.

In 2018, the Walker administration shifted up to $90 million in local road funding to road work related to the Foxconn factory. The Wisconsin state legislature granted Foxconn special legal privileges within the Wisconsin judicial system.

=== Curbing the powers of an incoming Democratic administration ===
Shortly after losing his re-election bid in 2018, Walker expressed support for a proposal by Wisconsin Republicans to curb the powers of the incoming Democratic administration during the lame-duck session. In December 2018, Walker signed legislation to strip powers from the incoming Democratic administration. The incoming administration suggested it would challenge the legislation in court. In 2010, Walker had expressed opposition to attempts to pass legislation during the lame-duck session before he took office as governor. An official lawsuit against the legislation was filed by Democratic organizations on January 10, 2019, in Dane County court.

=== Assessments of tenure ===
In 2019, the Milwaukee Journal Sentinel described Walker as a polarizing governor, writing that while "his personality wasn't divisive... his leadership was polarizing in several ways. One was simply his successful pursuit of aggressively conservative policies, which excited his supporters and angered his opponents. A second was the 'shock and awe' factor. His defining early accomplishment – all but ending collective bargaining for public-sector unions – was not a policy he campaigned on in 2010. It was a post-election bombshell... A third factor was a systematic project by the governor and GOP lawmakers to make it more difficult for Democrats to win elections or exercise power by tilting the political playing field."

== 2016 presidential campaign ==
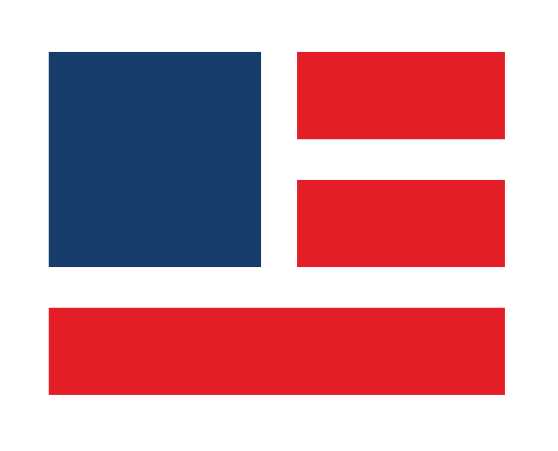
Flag logo of Walker's campaign

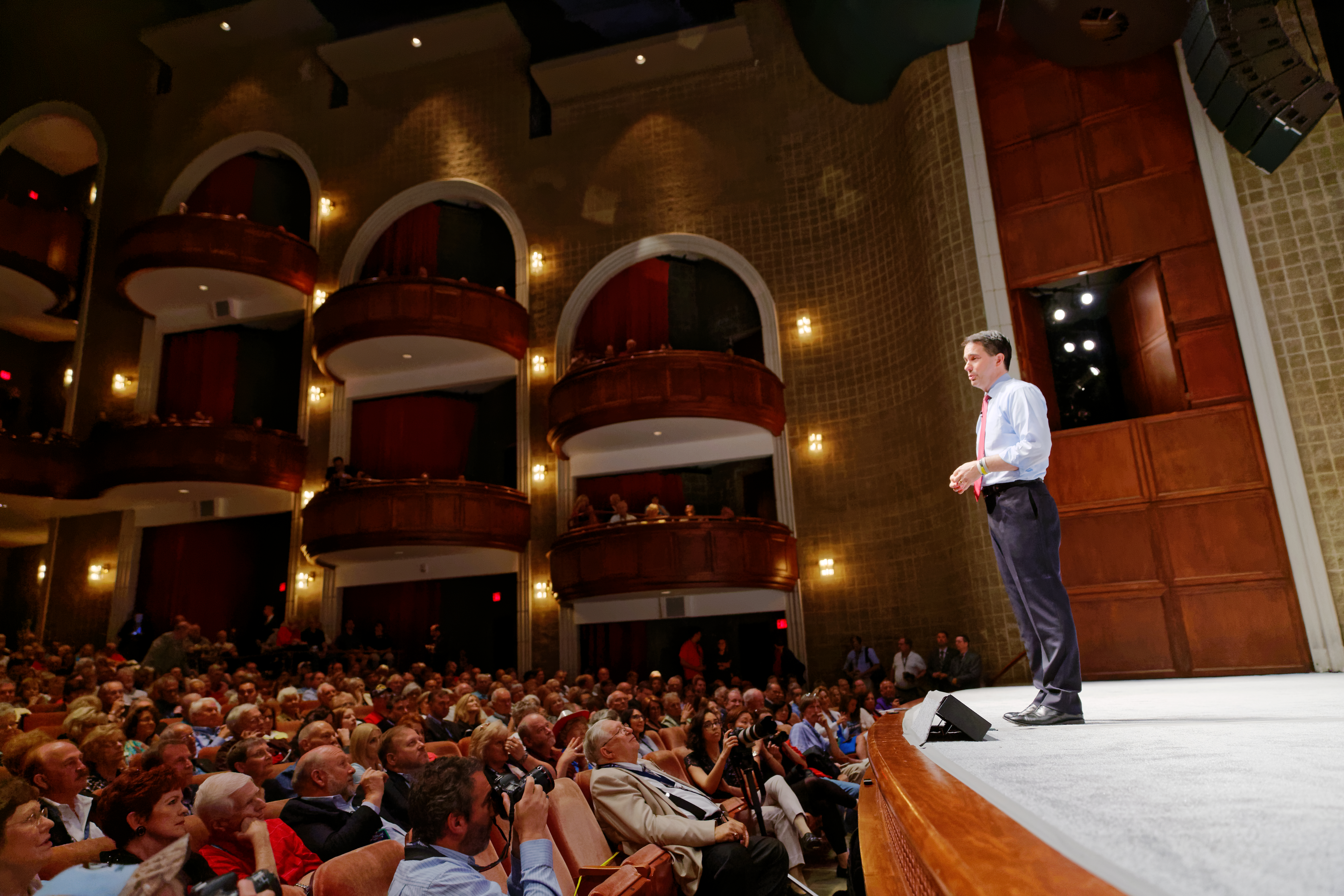
Governor Walker at Citizens United Freedom Summit in South Carolina

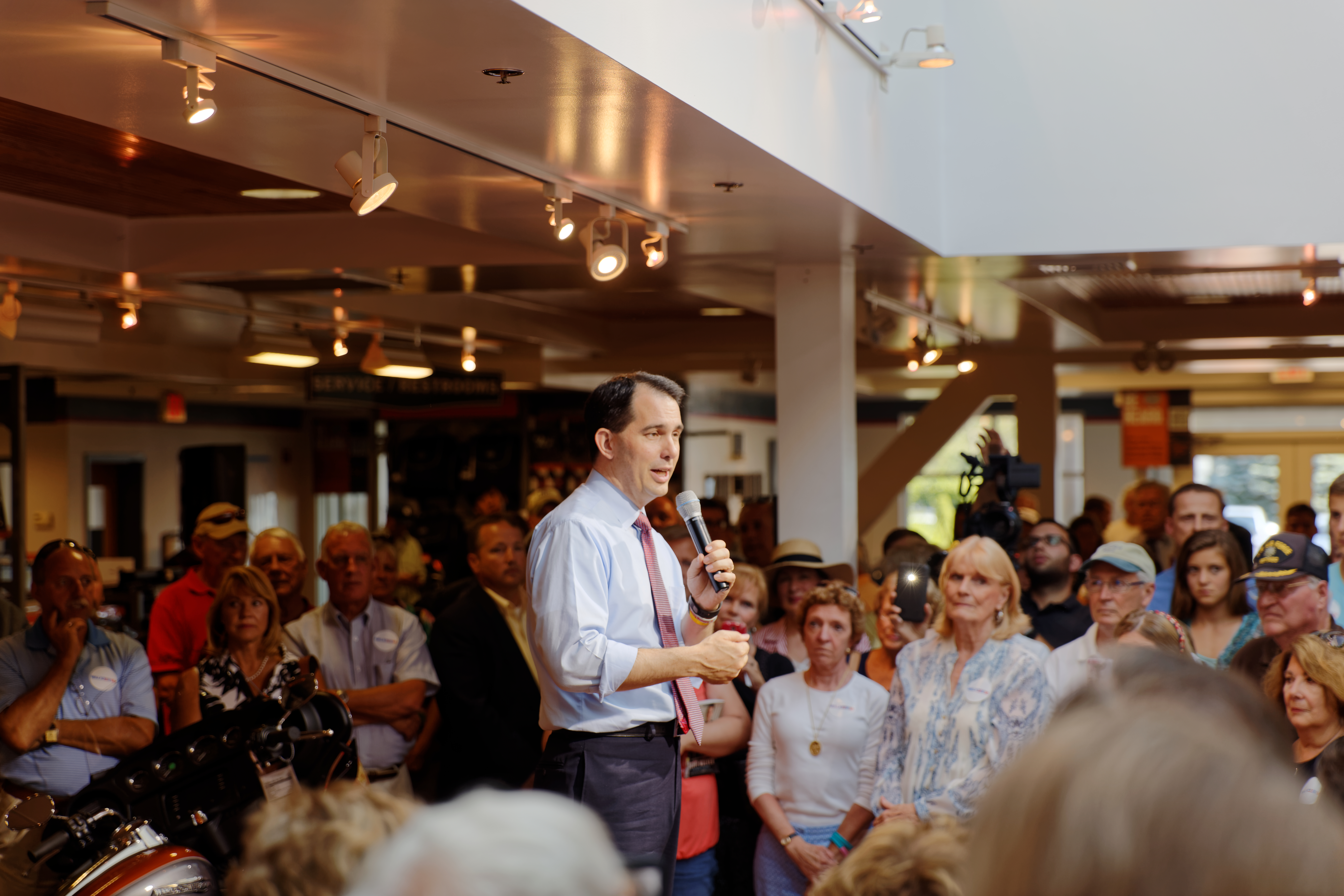
Governor Walker speaks in New Hampshire

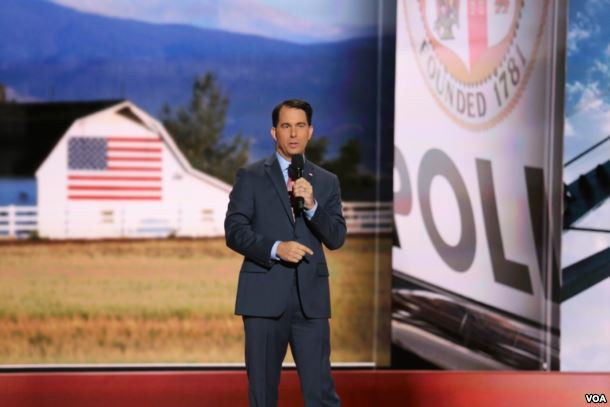
Walker speaking at the 2016 Republican National Convention

In late January 2015, Walker set up a 527 organization called "Our American Revival" to "help spread his message and underwrite his activities" which The Washington Post described as helpful for building the political and fundraising networks for a run for the presidency.

In February 2015, Trip Gabriel of The New York Times described him as having "quickly vaulted into the top tier of likely candidates in the Republican presidential race". On April 20, at a fundraising event for the New York State Republican Party, David Koch told donors that he and his brother, who oversee one of the biggest private political organizations in the country, believed that Walker would be the Republican nominee.

Following a controversial statement by Rudy Giuliani, Walker declined to answer the question of whether he believes President Obama loves America or was a true Christian, stating that he did not know President Obama's patriotism was in doubt.

In June 2015, Walker took a further step towards a presidential campaign when he established a "testing-the-waters" federal campaign committee. This allowed him to raise federal campaign dollars as he explored a possible presidential run.

In July 2015, after Walker aides said that he would soon announce his candidacy, Walker announced his candidacy via social media on the morning of July 13, 2015, with Walker speaking at a formal event in Waukesha, Wisconsin that afternoon.

As of August 18, 2015, Crowdpac ranked Walker as the fourth-most conservative candidate (following Rand Paul, Ted Cruz and Ben Carson) for the 2016 presidential election based on an analysis of campaign donors. Based on an analysis including Crowdpac's rating, public statements by candidates on issues, and congressional voting (not applicable to Walker), FiveThirtyEight had ranked Walker the third-most conservative among candidates as of May 27, 2015.

Walker, who started his campaign as a top-tier candidate after what was considered a "break-out" event at the Iowa Freedom Caucus in January, saw his position gradually decline over the summer in 2015. Initially a front-runner in the race, Walker saw a precipitous decline in both polling numbers and campaign funds. On August 6, Walker participated in the first Republican primary debate in Cleveland, Ohio. His performance was seen as decent, without much fanfare nor attention given to it due to his short answers to questions which limited his airtime. Shortly after the debate, Walker admitted to wanting more airtime, but also mentioned that there were multiple debates ahead and that he was successful in changing the argument to which candidate could defeat Hillary Clinton in the general election. A national poll by CNN/ORC released on September 20, in the wake of the second Republican debate held at the Ronald Reagan Presidential Library, revealed that Walker's popularity among likely Republican voters had dropped to less than half of 1 percent.

On September 21, 2015, Walker suspended his campaign and asked other candidates to do the same, so that the party could rally around a conservative alternative to Donald Trump. Once considered a front-runner for the Republican nomination, Walker's campaign suffered from two lackluster debate performances, low fundraising and an inability to raise his profile among the 16 other GOP contenders.

On March 29, 2016, Walker endorsed the candidacy of Ted Cruz. After Donald Trump became the presumptive nominee for the Republican Party in May 2016, Walker stated that he would support Trump as the Republican nominee, saying that Trump would make a better president than Hillary Clinton. Walker withdrew his support for Trump on June 8, 2016, after Trump called the judge Gonzalo P. Curiel biased against Trump because of Curiel's Mexican heritage. While still maintaining that Trump would be better choice than Clinton, Walker noted that Trump was not yet the party's nominee and wanted Trump to renounce his comments on the judge before the 2016 Republican National Convention.

Walker also prepared then-Indiana governor and Republican vice-presidential nominee Mike Pence for his debate against Virginia senator and Democratic vice-presidential nominee Tim Kaine on October 4, 2016.

== After elected office ==
In July 2019, Walker told the Milwaukee Journal Sentinel that he would become the president of Young America's Foundation, a conservative student organization, in 2021. He also told the paper that the position would preclude his running for office in the next years which would rule out a Senate run or a return to the governorship in 2022.

On July 17, 2019, President Trump appointed Walker to the board of trustees of the Woodrow Wilson International Center for Scholars in the Smithsonian Institution.

== Political positions ==
=== Abortion ===
Throughout his life and career, Walker has opposed abortion. In 2010, Walker told the editorial board of the Milwaukee Journal Sentinel he opposed abortion, without exception for rape or incest. Regarding his stance on abortion, he has stated: "I don't apologize for that, but I don't focus on that; I don't obsess with it." In a TV ad during his 2014 campaign for re-election Walker identified as anti-abortion, and pointed to legislation he signed that leaves "the final decision to a woman and her doctor". In August 2015, he criticized the notion that abortion is necessary to save the life of the mother in certain cases, calling it a "false choice."

In an interview with the Milwaukee Journal Sentinel a few weeks before the November 2014 election, Walker declined to answer directly when asked if abortion should be prohibited after 20 weeks. In July 2015, Walker signed a state law banning abortion after 20 weeks, including in cases of rape or incest but excluding when immediate danger existed to the life of the mother.

=== Criminal justice ===
During his tenure in the state legislature, Walker campaigned on a "tough-on-crime" platform and sought to increase the length of criminal penalties by increasing mandatory minimums and by cutting parole possibilities. In 1996, he said, "The time has come to keep violent criminals in prison for their full terms."

He advocated for privatization of prisons.

=== Economy and budget ===
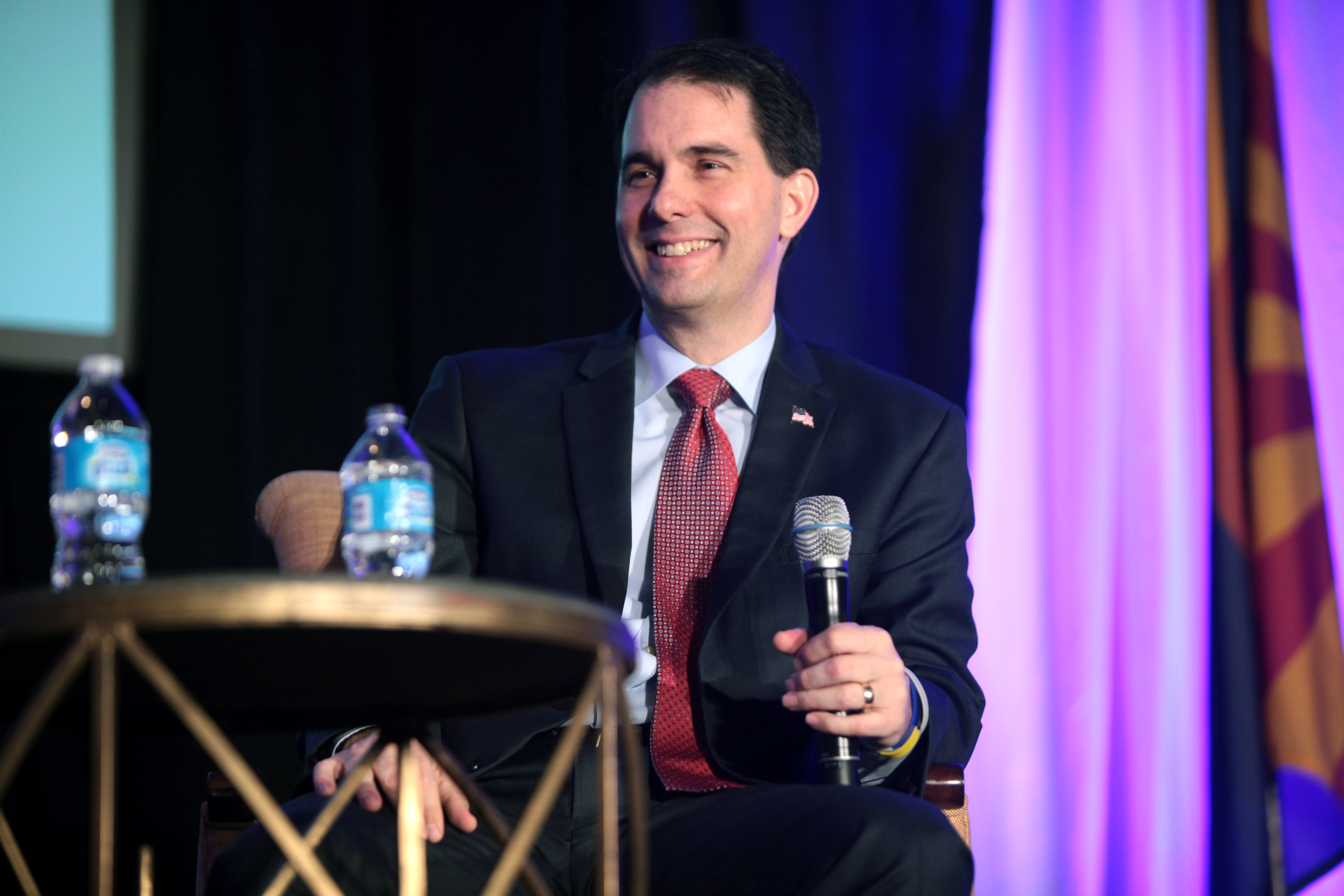
Governor Walker speaking at the Arizona Chamber of Commerce & Industry's Leadership Series luncheon in Phoenix, Arizona

As Governor of Wisconsin, Walker received the grade of B in 2012 and 2014 from the Cato Institute, a libertarian think tank, in their biennial Fiscal Policy Report Card on America's Governors.

Wisconsin calls itself "America's Dairyland," with more dairy farms than any other state. In 2012, Walker instituted a program to encourage dairy farmers to dramatically increase production, which resulted in a supply glut and years of depressed prices. This had a crippling effect on the industry, leaving it vulnerable when in 2018 Canada, China and Mexico imposed tariffs on American farm exports in retaliation for tariffs imposed on them by President Donald Trump. The New York Times reported that by April 2019 Wisconsin dairy farmers were facing "extinction."

=== Education ===
Walker moved to weaken tenure for professors at the University of Wisconsin System and to cut its funding, while offering authority to reduce spending. He recommended deleting parts of the system's mission that contribute to the Wisconsin Idea. Parts of the mission proposed for deletion, such as the "search for truth," were to be replaced with a directive "to meet the state's workforce needs." Walker later called the change a "drafting error," but public records requests and litigation showed that Walker himself and his office were "the driving force" behind the changes. He supports the public funding of private schools and religious schools in the form of vouchers for students. He supports the increased availability of charter schools.

=== Environment ===
Walker signed a "No Climate Tax" pledge promising not to support any legislation that would raise taxes to combat climate change and has been a keynote speaker at the Heartland Institute, which promotes climate change denial. He proposed funding cuts for clean energy and other environmental programs. He has proposed giving many powers of the Environmental Protection Agency to the states. He opposed the Obama administration's efforts to reduce carbon emissions.

=== Foreign policy ===
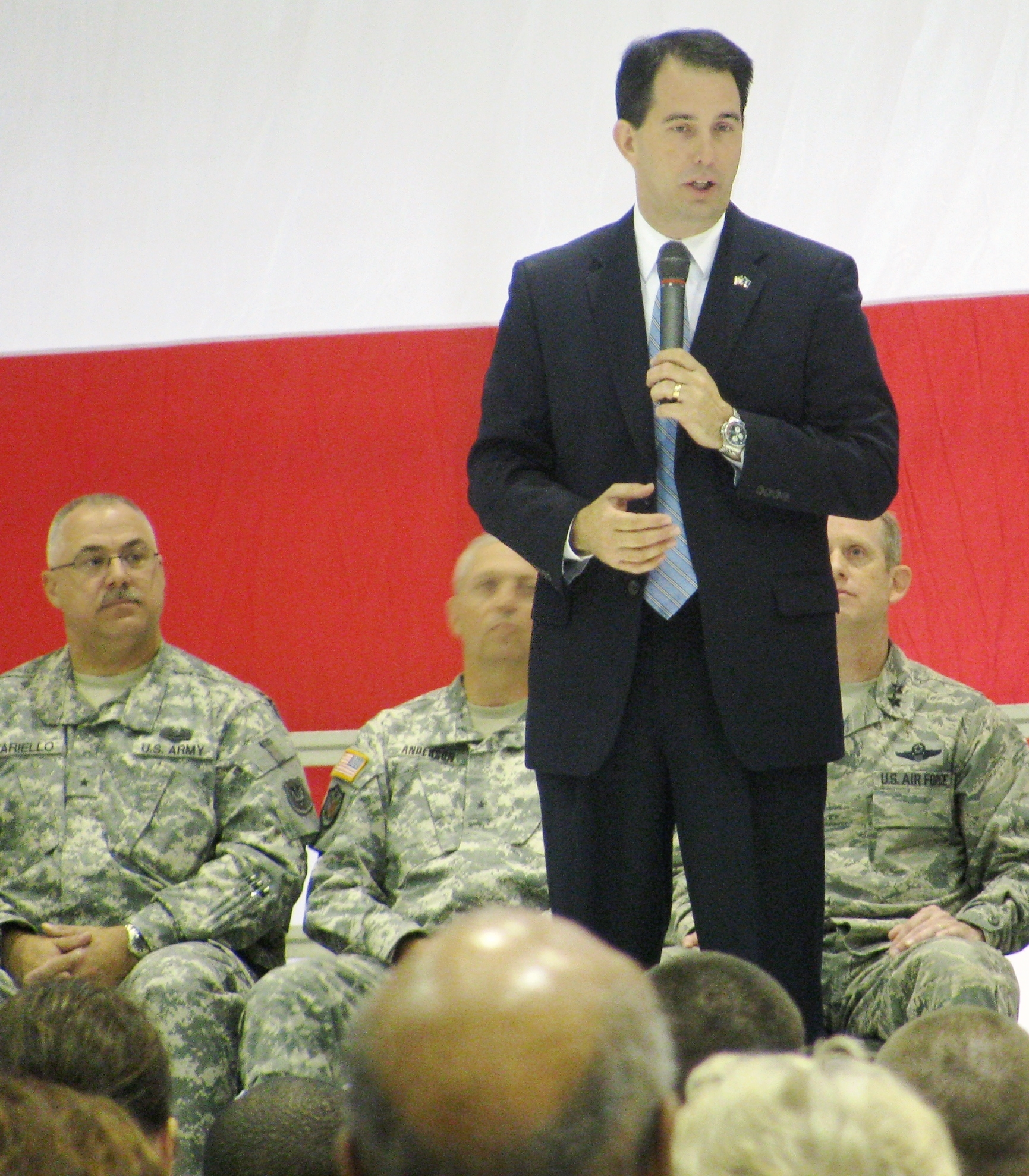
Walker in 2011, speaking to troops who would participate in the NATO-led peacekeeping mission in Kosovo

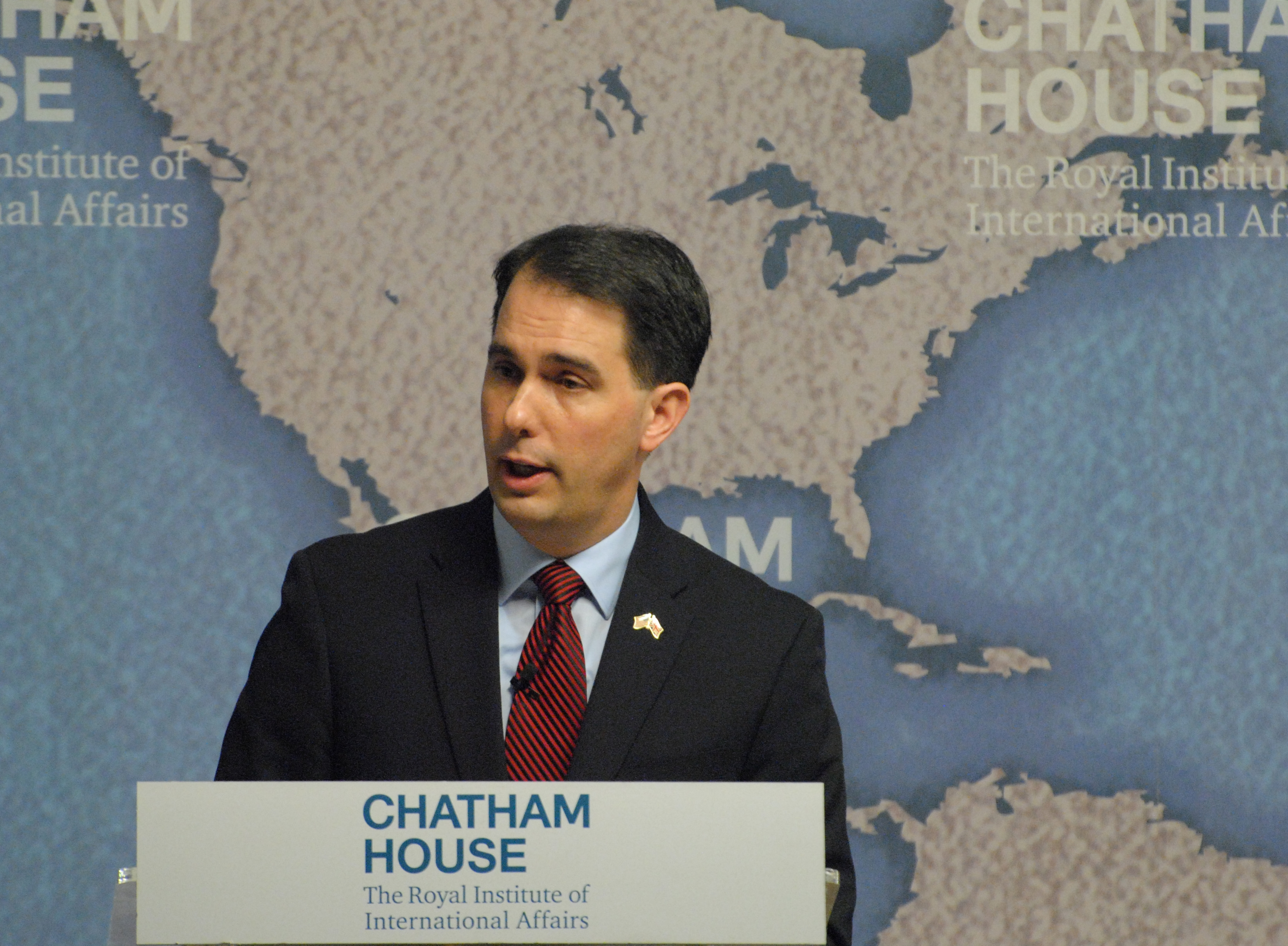
Governor Walker speaking at the Chatham House in London in 2015

In 2015, Walker indicated that he favored providing arms to Ukraine to fight in the Russo-Ukrainian War.

In 2015, Walker stated in an interview with Charlie Sykes that if elected president, he would "absolutely" decide on his first day in office to "cancel any Iranian deal the Obama administration makes," even if European allies which were also party to an agreement opted not to reimpose sanctions.

In 2015, while campaigning for the Republican presidential nomination, Walker faulted Obama for lack of strategy in dealing with the Islamic State of Iraq and the Levant group, and did not rule out sending U.S. troops to Syria to engage in ground combat with ISIL there. In February 2015, when asked about the war in Syria, Walker said that the U.S. should "go beyond just aggressive air strikes. We have to look at other surgical methods. And ultimately, we have to be prepared to put boots on the ground if that's what it takes."

In a 2015 interview, Walker said that "the most significant foreign policy decision" of his lifetime was President Ronald Reagan's firing 11,000 striking air traffic controllers in 1981, saying: "It sent a message not only across America, it sent a message around the world ... [that] we weren't to be messed with."

In 2015, Walker opposed rapprochement in relations between the U.S. and Cuba.

=== Guns ===
Walker has supported gun rights. In July 2011, he signed a bill into law making Wisconsin the 49th concealed carry state in the United States, and on December 7 of that same year he signed the castle doctrine into law. In January and April 2015 speeches in Iowa, Walker included passing those laws among his accomplishments.

The NRA Political Victory Fund gave Walker a 100% ranking in 2014.

On June 24, 2015, Walker signed two bills into law, one which removed the state's 48-hour waiting period for buying a gun and another which gave retired or off-duty police officers the legal right to carry concealed guns in public schools.

=== Health care ===
Walker opposes the Affordable Care Act (ACA or "Obamacare") and had signed Wisconsin onto a lawsuit seeking to have the ACA rolled back (including provisions for preexisting conditions). He supported the Graham–Cassidy health care amendment to repeal the ACA; this repeal bill would have eliminated blanket protections for preexisting conditions. In 2018, Walker pledged to pass legislation to protect individuals with preexisting conditions in case the Affordable Care Act were repealed; according to PolitiFact, "he hasn't spelled out an alternative that would provide protections that Obamacare does." As Governor, he has blocked expansion of Medicaid in Wisconsin.

=== Redistricting ===
In Wisconsin, responsibility for redrawing legislative and congressional district lines rests with the legislature. The legislature is required to redraw legislative and congressional districts every 10 years based upon the results of the decennial federal census. The redistricting legislation after the 2010 Census was signed by Walker in August 2011 in a private ceremony to which no Democrats or news agencies were invited. As an outcome of legal action by Wisconsin Democrats, a panel of Federal judges found in 2016 that the Wisconsin Legislature's 2011 redrawing of State Assembly districts to favor Republicans was an unconstitutional partisan gerrymander. Walker has appeared on Fox News to defend the 2011 redistricting, but even that conservative-leaning forum has criticized his efforts.

=== Immigration ===
Walker has claimed that securing the American border with Mexico is "our first priority". After that, undocumented immigrants in the United States could "secure their citizenship" but would have to "get in the back of line", and wait like anyone else applying for citizenship. Walker says that he does not advocate deportation for all people in the country illegally, but he is not in favor of amnesty.

In a 2015 appearance on Meet the Press, Walker said proposals to build a wall along the 5,525 mi (8,892 km) Canada–United States border was "a legitimate issue for us to look at."

Walker has stated that he would work to "protect American workers" by aligning his position with Sen. Jeff Sessions (R-AL), who wrote in a Washington Post op-ed that legal immigration needs to be "slowed".

=== Role of government ===
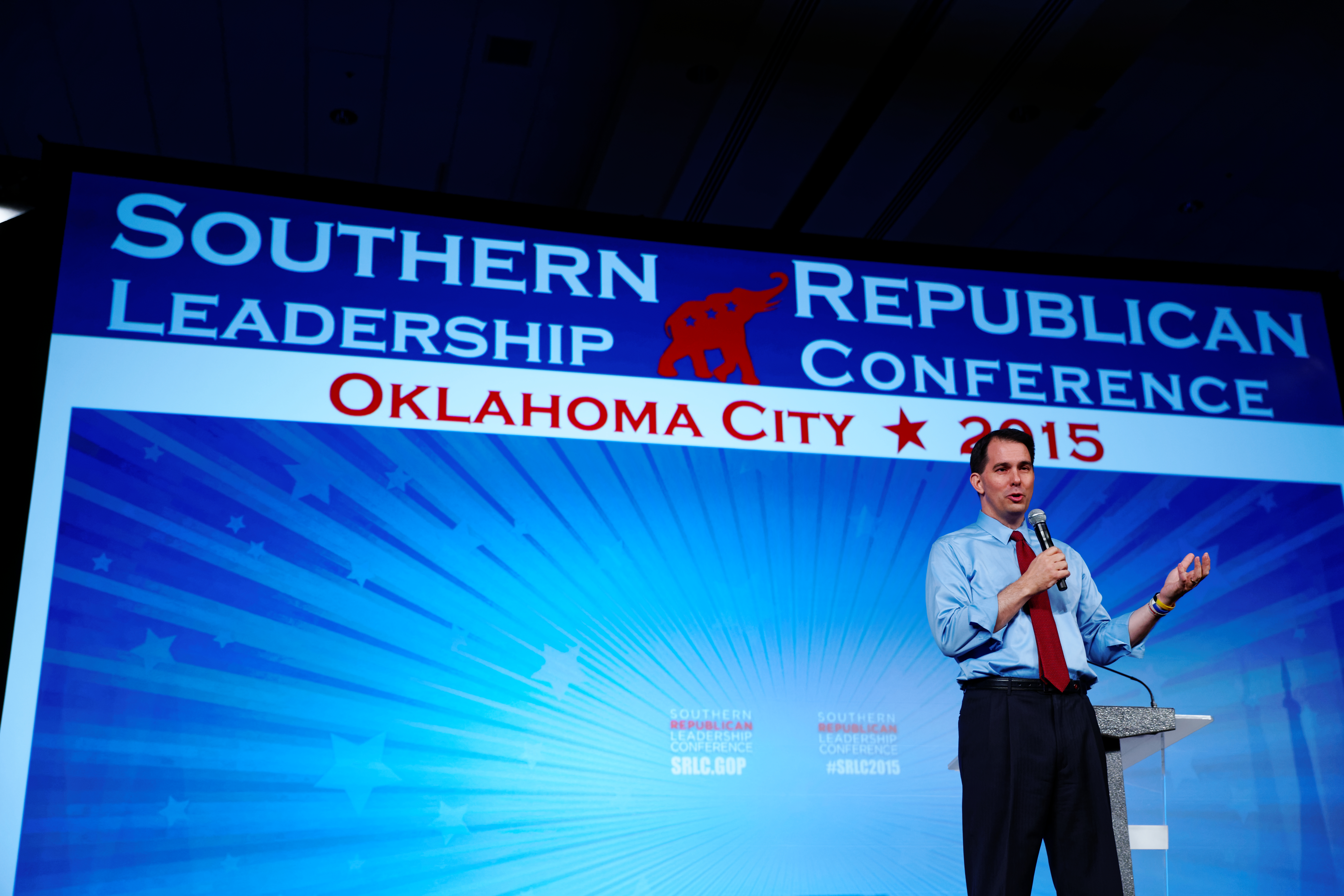
Governor Walker at 2015 Southern Republican Leadership Conference in Oklahoma City, OK

Walker wrote in an editorial in The Washington Post that "Like most Americans, I think government is too big and too expansive, but the government that is necessary should work – and work well."

=== Same-sex marriage ===
Walker says he believes in "marriage between one man and one woman". Walker voted for Wisconsin's constitutional amendment to ban same-sex marriage, both as a legislator and as a voter. In September 2014, Walker said he was defending the amendment. When the U.S. Supreme Court subsequently rejected the appeals of five states, including Wisconsin, in October 2014, allowing same-sex marriages to continue, Walker stated: "I think it's resolved." In April 2015, in New Hampshire, Walker stated that marriage is "defined as between a man and a woman", and in Iowa said a federal constitutional amendment allowing states to define marriage was reasonable. Walker called the U.S. Supreme Court's Obergefell v. Hodges decision to legalize same-sex marriage nationwide a "grave mistake".

=== Unions ===
Walker said public-union collective-bargaining rights frustrate balancing the state budget. Walker signed right-to-work legislation he said would contribute to economic growth. The Atlantic has written that "anti-union politics" have defined his tenure as governor and established him as a Republican presidential contender. Politico wrote that Walker initiated a 21st-century revival of anti-union legislation in upper Midwestern industrial states and that his "fervent anti-union rhetoric and actions" has helped his national reputation within the Republican Party.

=== Youth rights ===
On May 24, 2017, Walker signed a bill that allowed unaccompanied minors to attend concerts and other musical festivals where alcohol is being served. On June 21, 2017, he signed into law a bill that allowed 16- and 17-year-olds to work without parental permission.

== Personal life ==
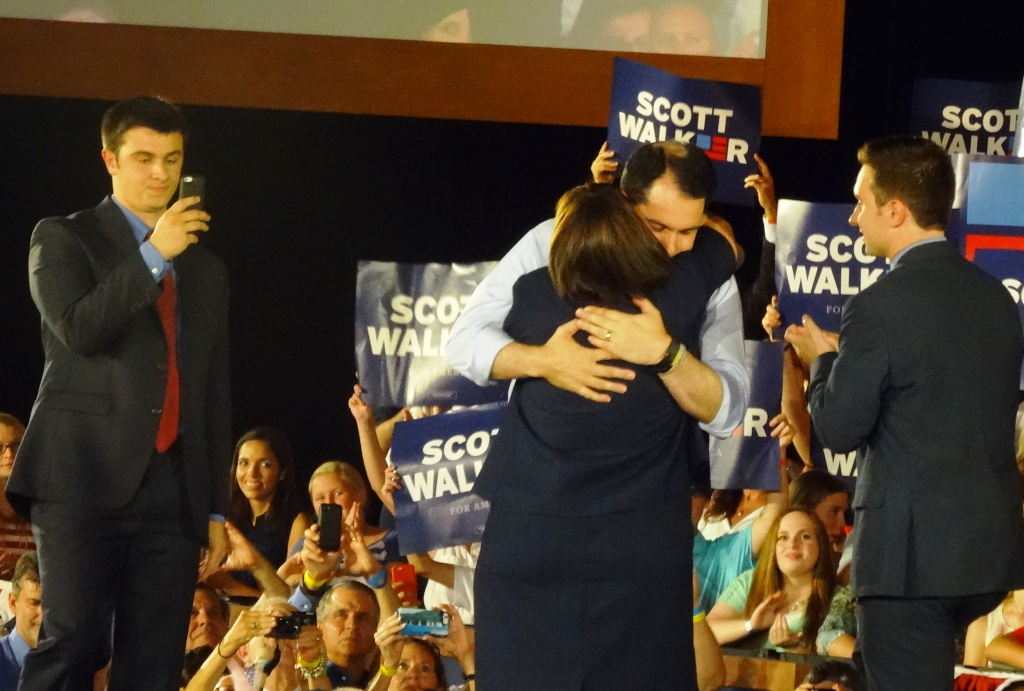
Walker embraces his wife Tonette during his 2016 presidential campaign announcement with their sons present

Walker and his wife, Tonette, have two sons, Alex and Matt. The family attends Meadowbrook Church, a nondenominational, evangelical church in Wauwatosa where they also live, which is a daughter church of Elmbrook Church, in nearby Brookfield. Tonette Walker works in the development department for the American Lung Association.

During the summers of 2004 through 2009, as Milwaukee County Executive, Walker led a motorcycle tour called the "Executive's Ride" through Wisconsin and parts of neighboring states. The ride was organized to attract people to Milwaukee County. Walker rides a 2003 Harley Davidson Road King.

In 2013, Walker published Unintimidated – A Governor's Story and A Nation's Challenge, co-written with Marc Thiessen, about his experiences during the recall vote and subsequent election, both of which he won.

== Bibliography ==
- Walker, Scott and Marc Thiessen (2013). Unintimidated: A Governor's Story and a Nation's Challenge. Sentinel HC. ISBN 978-1-59523-107-9.

== Electoral history ==
=== Governor of Wisconsin ===
2018 Wisconsin gubernatorial election
Party	Candidate	Votes	%	±%
Democratic	Tony Evers	1,324,307	49.54%	+2.95%
Republican	Scott Walker (incumbent)	1,295,080	48.44%	−3.82%
Libertarian	Phil Anderson	20,255	0.76%	N/A
Independent	Maggie Turnbull	18,884	0.71%	N/A
Green	Michael White	11,087	0.41%	N/A
Independent	Arnie Enz	2,745	0.10%	N/A
n/a	Write-ins	980	0.04%	−0.02%
Total votes		2,673,308	100.0%	N/A

2014 Wisconsin gubernatorial election
Party	Candidate	Votes	%
Republican	Scott Walker (incumbent)	1,259,706	52.26
Democratic	Mary Burke	1,122,913	46.59
Libertarian	Robert Burke	18,720	0.78
Independent	Dennis Fehr	7,530	0.31
Majority		136,793	5.67%
Total votes		2,410,314	100

2012 Wisconsin gubernatorial recall election results
Party	Candidate	Votes	%
Republican	Scott Walker (incumbent)	1,335,585	53.1
Democratic	Tom Barrett	1,164,480	46.3
Independent	Hariprasad Trivedi	14,463	0.6
Total votes		2,514,528	100.0
Republican hold			

2010 Wisconsin gubernatorial election
Party	Candidate	Votes	%	±%
Republican	Scott Walker	1,128,941	52.29%	+6.93%
Democratic	Tom Barrett	1,004,303	46.52%	−6.24%
Independent	Jim Langer	10,608	0.49%	
Common Sense	James James	8,273	0.38%	
Libertarian	Terry Virgil	6,790	0.31%	
Write-ins		59	0.00%	
Majority		124,638	5.77%	−1.62%
Turnout		2,158,974		
Republican gain from Democratic		Swing		

2010 Wisconsin gubernatorial election – Republican primary
Party	Candidate	Votes	%
Republican	Scott Walker	360,053	58.6
Republican	Mark Neumann	237,944	38.7
Republican	Scott Paterick	16,609	2.7

=== Milwaukee County Executive ===
2008 Milwaukee County Executive election Non-partisan election
Candidate	Votes	%
Scott Walker (incumbent)	98,039	59
Lena Taylor	68,785	41

2004 Milwaukee County Executive election Non-partisan election
Candidate	Votes	%
Scott Walker (incumbent)	136,203	57
David Riemer	101,089	43

2002 Milwaukee County Executive special election Non-partisan election
Candidate	Votes	%
Scott Walker	99,850	55
James Ryan	81,099	45

=== Wisconsin State Assembly ===
2000 Wisconsin State Assembly 14th District election
Party	Candidate	Votes	%
Republican	Scott Walker (incumbent)	20,268	100
Democratic	None	0	0
Republican hold			

1998 Wisconsin State Assembly 14th District election
Party	Candidate	Votes	%
Republican	Scott Walker (incumbent)	14,110	68
Democratic	Jim Heidenreich	6,750	32
Republican hold			

1996 Wisconsin State Assembly 14th District election
Party	Candidate	Votes	%
Republican	Scott Walker (incumbent)	15,658	62
Democratic	Dale Dulberger	9,792	38
Republican hold			

1994 Wisconsin State Assembly 14th District election
Party	Candidate	Votes	%
Republican	Scott Walker (incumbent)	15,487	100
Democratic	None		0
Republican hold			

1993 Wisconsin State Assembly 14th District special election
Party	Candidate	Votes	%
Republican	Scott Walker	5,027	57
Democratic	Christopher T. Ament	3,663	42
Libertarian	Larry A. Boge	93	1
Republican hold			

1990 Wisconsin State Assembly 7th District election
Party	Candidate	Votes	%
Democratic	Gwen Moore (incumbent)	3,847	69
Republican	Scott Walker	1,690	31
Democratic hold			

== See also ==
- Scott Walker presidential campaign, 2016
- Republican Party presidential candidates, 2016

Political offices
Preceded by Janine Geske; Acting	Executive of Milwaukee County; 2002–2010	Succeeded by Lee Holloway; Acting
Preceded by Jim Doyle	Governor of Wisconsin; 2011–2019	Succeeded by Tony Evers
Party political offices
Preceded by Mark Green	Republican nominee for Governor of Wisconsin; 2010, 2012, 2014, 2018	Succeeded by Tim Michels
Preceded by Susana Martinez	Chair of the Republican Governors Association; 2016–2017	Succeeded by Bill Haslam
U.S. order of precedence (ceremonial)
Preceded by Jim Doyle as Former Governor	Order of precedence of the United States; Within Wisconsin	Succeeded by Jack Markell as Former Governor
Preceded by Jim Doyle as Former Governor	Order of precedence of the United States; Outside Wisconsin	Succeeded by Jerry Brown as Former Governor
