= Janine P. Geske =

20th century American judge

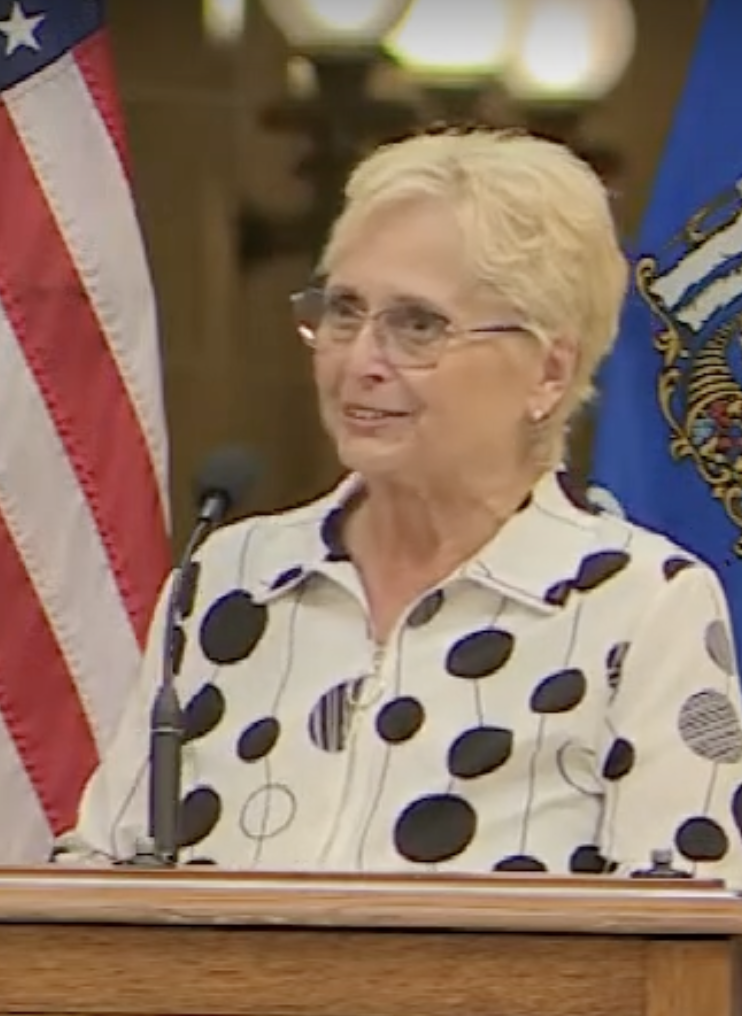
- Speaking at the investiture of Janet Protasiewicz in 2023

Justice of the Wisconsin Supreme Court
- In office September 4, 1993 – September 10, 1998
- Appointed by: Tommy Thompson
- Preceded by: Louis J. Ceci
- Succeeded by: David Prosser Jr.

Interim Executive of Milwaukee County
- In office February 26, 2002 – April 30, 2002
- Preceded by: Karen Ordinans (acting)
- Succeeded by: Scott Walker

Wisconsin Circuit Judge for the Milwaukee Circuit, Branch 23
- In office August 13, 1981 – September 3, 1993
- Appointed by: Lee S. Dreyfus
- Preceded by: Fred Kessler
- Succeeded by: Elsa C. Lamelas

Personal details
- Born: May 12, 1949 (age 77) Port Washington, Wisconsin, U.S.
- Education: Beloit College; Marquette University Law School

Janine Patricia Geske (born May 12, 1949) is an American lawyer and jurist from Ozaukee County, Wisconsin. She was a justice of the Wisconsin Supreme Court from 1993 to 1998, and served as interim Milwaukee County Executive in 2002. Earlier in her career, she was a Wisconsin circuit court judge in Milwaukee County (1981–1993).

== Life and career ==
Born in Port Washington, Wisconsin, Geske was raised in the nearby community of Cedarburg. She graduated from Cedarburg High School in 1967 and received her bachelor's and master's degrees from Beloit College in 1971 and 1972, respectively. Geske earned her J.D. degree from the Marquette University Law School in 1975.

Geske worked as chief staff attorney for the Legal Aid Society of Milwaukee until 1979. She was an assistant professor at Marquette University Law School from 1978 to 1981 and was founding director of the Marquette University Law School's Clinic for the Elderly. From 1981 to 1993, Geske served as a Milwaukee County circuit court judge. In 1993, she was appointed to the Wisconsin Supreme Court by Governor Tommy Thompson, a Republican. Geske was elected to a full term on the court in 1994 but resigned from the bench in 1998.

Following her departure from the court, Geske worked as a professor at Marquette University, holding the Association of Marquette University Women's Chair in Humanistic Studies in 2000 and 2001. From February to May 2002, she served as the interim Milwaukee County Executive, following the resignation of F. Thomas Ament amid a massive pension scandal. Later in 2002, Geske was appointed interim dean of the Marquette University Law School, serving until 2003. Geske has remained on the law school faculty and is on the faculty of the National Judicial College in Reno, Nevada. In both 1994 and 2002, the Milwaukee Bar honored her with its Lawyer of the Year award.

In 2017, Geske was one of 54 former Wisconsin judges who signed a letter advocating for rules requiring judges to recuse themselves in cases involving campaign donors.

Geske endorsed Joe Biden in the 2020 United States presidential election, her first time endorsing a partisan candidate in, according to her, at least 40 years.

Political offices
Preceded by Karen Ordinans; Acting	Executive of Milwaukee County; 2002	Succeeded by Scott Walker
Legal offices
Preceded by Fred Kessler	Wisconsin Circuit Judge for the Milwaukee Circuit, Branch 23; August 13, 1981 – September 3, 1993	Succeeded by Elsa C. Lamelas
Preceded by Louis J. Ceci	Justice of the Wisconsin Supreme Court; September 4, 1993 – September 10, 1998	Succeeded by David Prosser Jr.
