= Karen Ordinans =

American politician and child care advocate

Milwaukee County Board of Supervisors (chair from 1996-2002)
- In office 1992–2003

Director of the Children's Health Alliance of Wisconsin
- In office 2003–2021

Acting Milwaukee County executive
- In office 2002–2002
- Preceded by: Tom Ament
- Succeeded by: Janine P. Geske

Personal details
- Citizenship: American
- Party: Democratic
- Occupation: Former politician, daycare worker and non-profit executive

Karen Ordinans is an American politician and child care advocate.

Ordinans graduated from University of Wisconsin–Milwaukee. Ordinans taught in a day care center and was involved with the health of children. She was elected to the Milwaukee County Board of Supervisors in 1992 and was selected as the chair of the county board in 1996. In 2002, Ordinans served briefly as the acting Milwaukee County executive when Tom Ament retired. Ordinans was then recalled in 2002 because of a retirement pension controversy.

Ordinans later served as executive director of the Children's Health Alliance of Wisconsin for eighteen years from 2003 until her retirement in 2021.
