= W. Phillips Shively =

Academic background
- Education: University of North Carolina at Chapel Hill (PhD)

Academic work
- Discipline: Political science
- Sub-discipline: Comparative politics, electoral studies, political methodology
- Institutions: University of Minnesota
- Notable works: The Craft of Political Research

Phillips Shivley is a Professor of Political Science at the University of Minnesota. He is the author is a research methods text The Craft of Political Research first published in 1974 and American Democracy in Context.
