= Robert Maranto =

American political scientist (born 1958)

Robert Anthony Maranto is a political scientist who holds the 21st Century Chair in Leadership at the Department of Education Reform at the University of Arkansas (appointed in 2008). Maranto earned his doctorate in political science from the University of Minnesota in 1989.

Maranto taught at Villanova University and worked in the Clinton administration and at the Brookings Institution. With others including his wife April, he has produced eleven books, including President Obama and Education Reform, A Guide to Charter Schools, Beyond a Government of Strangers, and Radical Reform of the Civil Service. In 2009 he co-edited both the conservative-leaning The Politically Correct University, and the liberal-leaning Judging Bush. His co-authored Education Reform in the Obama Era: The Second Term and the 2016 Election, published by Palgrave.

He is on the board of a nonprofit cyber charter school for at-risk youth, Achievement House. He is on the Arkansas Advisory Committee for the U.S. Civil Rights Commission.

== Books ==
- Maranto, R., R. Redding, and F. Hess eds. (2009) The Politically Correct University, Washington: AEI Press.
- Maranto, R., T. Lansford, and J. Johnson eds. (2009) Judging Bush, Stanford: Stanford University Press.
- Kayes, Myron and Robert Maranto eds. (2006) A Guide to Charter Schools: Research and Practical Advice for Educators, Littlefield Education.
- Maranto, Robert, Douglas M. Brattebo, and Tom Lansford, eds. (2006) The Second Term of George W. Bush: Prospects and Perils, New York: Macmillan/Palgrave.
- Maranto, R. (2005) Beyond a Government of Strangers: How Career Executives and Political Appointees Can Turn Conflict to Cooperation, Lanham: Lexington.
- Condrey, S. and R. Maranto, eds. (2001) Radical Reform of the Civil Service, Lanham: Lexington.
- Maranto, R., S. R. Milliman, F. Hess, and A.W. Gresham, eds. (1999) School Choice in the Real World: Lessons from Arizona Charter Schools, Boulder: Westview.

== Reports ==
- Maranto, R., Gary Ritter, and Sandra Stotsky (2008) “The Good, the Bad, and the Ugly: Will President Obama’s School Reform Bring the Change Kids Need?” Golden, CO: Independence Institute (IP-10-2008).
- Maranto, R., Nathan A. Benefield, and Jason O’Brien (2007) “Edifice Complex: Where has all the Money Gone?,” The Commonwealth Foundation for Public Policy Alternatives.
