= Dave Schulz (politician) =

American politician

David F. Schulz

Milwaukee County Executive
- In office 1988–1992
- Preceded by: William O'Donnell
- Succeeded by: Tom Ament

Personal details
- Born: David Schulz; September 24, 1949 Milwaukee, Wisconsin, U.S.
- Died: October 7, 2007 (aged 58) Winthrop Harbor, Illinois, U.S.
- Spouse: JoAnn Schulz
- Education: Purdue University, Northwestern University

David F. Schulz (September 24, 1949 – October 7, 2007) was a Wisconsin politician and the third Milwaukee County Executive, serving from 1988 to 1992.

== Biography ==
Schulz was born in Milwaukee, Wisconsin, where his father was a tax enforcement supervisor and his mother a secretary at the University of Wisconsin–Milwaukee. He graduated from Riverside High School, and received his bachelor's degree in civil engineering from Purdue University. He later received his master's degree in public management from Northwestern University in Evanston, Illinois.

Throughout the 1970s, Schulz held a variety of positions in both Chicago and Milwaukee city government. In 1977, he joined the Southeastern Wisconsin Regional Planning Commission. However, just 2 years later, he was named an assistant budget director for the City of Chicago, and later, in May 1983, Schulz became the budget director for Chicago's newly elected mayor, Harold Washington. Less than one year later, in February 1984, he accepted the same position in the government of Milwaukee County Executive William O'Donnell, bringing him back to his hometown.

Schulz's arrival on the Milwaukee political scene came in December 1985 when O'Donnell named Schulz his new parks director. In that capacity, Schulz oversaw the budget of the county park system and implemented a widespread promotional campaign. That campaign was notable for a series of promotional stunts that involved Schulz, at nearly 470 lbs., sliding down water slides in a wet t-shirt.

Amidst criticism that Schulz was politicizing the parks director position, he made a political endorsement of then-state senator John Norquist for mayor of Milwaukee in 1988. O'Donnell immediately fired him for making the endorsement without approval, and Schulz shortly thereafter announced he would run against his former boss O'Donnell for county executive in 1988. Schulz defeated O'Donnell in the election by a 2–1 margin.

Schulz only served one term as county executive, deciding that, with a notorious hot temper, he wasn't prepared to be a politician and accordingly wouldn't seek re-election in 1992. His tenure had been marked by clashes with the county board of supervisors, as well as the county sheriff, Richard Artison, and members of the state legislature from the Milwaukee area. While he triumphed over initiating the efforts that eventually led to the construction of Miller Park nearly 10 years later, upgrading Mitchell International Airport, and expanding the parks system, his time in office was also remembered for high property tax increases and a scandal within the Milwaukee County Zoo system. Schulz was succeeded by Tom Ament, his frequent nemesis on the county board of supervisors.

In 1992, Schulz became the founding director of the Infrastructure Technology Institute at Northwestern University, and concurrently served as an adjunct professor of civil and environmental engineering.

Schulz lived in Winthrop Harbor, Illinois, where he died on October 7, 2007, at the age of 58. He was survived by his wife, Jo Ann and son, Bobby. His portrait can be seen hanging outside the county executive's office in the Milwaukee County Courthouse.

== Notes ==
Preceded by William O'Donnell	Milwaukee County Executive; 1988 - 1992	Succeeded by Tom Ament
