= John Doyne =

American politician

Milwaukee County Executive
- In office 1960–1976

Personal details
- Born: John Lyons Doyne; March 13, 1912 Chicago, Illinois, U.S.
- Died: January 29, 1997 (aged 84) Milwaukee, Wisconsin, U.S.
- Education: Marquette University; Marquette University Law School

John Lyons Doyne (March 13, 1912 – January 29, 1997) was a Wisconsin politician and the first County Executive of Milwaukee County, Wisconsin.

Born in Chicago, Illinois, Doyne received his bachelor's degree from Marquette University and then received his law degree from the Marquette University Law School. Doyne practiced law. From 1941 to 1943, he served in the Wisconsin State Assembly. Then Doyne served in the United States Navy in the Pacific during World War II. In 1953, he was appointed Milwaukee County Deputy Treasurer and then in 1954, he was appointed to the Milwaukee County Board of Supervisors. He was vice chairman and then chairman of the board. In 1960, Doyne was elected County Executive of Milwaukee County serving until 1976.

Doyne's personal achievement was centralizing the area's major hospitals, including Children's Wisconsin, onto the county grounds through a public-private partnership with the Medical College of Wisconsin, with the Milwaukee County Medical Complex, having been renamed Doyne Hospital in his honor, having its operations subsumed into Froedtert Hospital in 1995. His portrait can be seen hanging outside the County Executive offices on the third floor of the Milwaukee County Courthouse.

Doyne died of cancer on January 29, 1997 in Milwaukee.
