= Tom Ament =

American politician (1937–2014)

F. Thomas Ament

Milwaukee County Executive
- In office 1992 – February 26, 2002
- Preceded by: Dave Schultz
- Succeeded by: Janine P. Geske (interim); Scott Walker

Chairman of the Milwaukee County Board of Supervisors
- In office 1976–1992
- Preceded by: William F. O'Donnell

Personal details
- Born: Francis Thomas Ament; November 17, 1937 Milwaukee, Wisconsin, U.S.
- Died: March 10, 2014 (aged 76) Milwaukee, Wisconsin, U.S.
- Party: Democratic
- Education: Marquette University

Francis Thomas Ament (November 17, 1937 – March 10, 2014) was the fourth Milwaukee County Executive, serving from 1992 until his resignation in 2002 amid a county pension scandal. Ament had served as chairman of the Milwaukee County Board of Supervisors from 1976 to 1992.

== Life ==
He graduated from Marquette University High School in 1955, earned his bachelor's degree from Marquette University in 1959 and his law degree from the Marquette University Law School in 1962. He was elected to the Milwaukee County Board of Supervisors. He was selected as board chairman in 1976, and stayed on the board until he defeated Joseph Czarnezki to become county executive in 1992, replacing one-term legislator Dave Schultz. After a scandal over pensions for county employees, an effort was mounted by conservative special interest group Citizens for Responsible Government in early 2002 to recall Ament. The group collected over 100,000 petition signatures to force a recall election.

On February 21, 2002, Ament announced his retirement effective February 26 at a Milwaukee County Board meeting. By retiring instead of resigning, Ament remained eligible to claim his own pension. He was replaced by former Wisconsin Supreme Court Justice Janine Geske on an interim basis and by state Representative Scott Walker, a Republican, following a special election. After two terms as county executive, Walker would resign in 2010 ahead of being elected Governor of Wisconsin, on office he would serve another two terms in.

Preceded by Dave Schulz	Milwaukee County Executive; 1992 – 2002	Succeeded by Janine Geske (interim)
