= List of United States attorneys for Wisconsin =

The office of United States Attorney for the Wisconsin Territory came into being when the Wisconsin Territory was created from the remnants of the Michigan Territory. When Wisconsin became the 30th state in 1848, the United States Attorney for the District of Wisconsin was established. In 1870, the state was split into two jurisdictions, the United States Attorney for the Eastern District of Wisconsin and the United States Attorney for the Western District of Wisconsin.

== Wisconsin Territory ==
U.S. Attorney	Years	Notes	President(s)
William W. Chapman	1836 – 1838		Andrew Jackson
William W. Chapman	1836 – 1838		Martin Van Buren
Moses M. Strong	1838 – 1841		Martin Van Buren
Thomas W. Sutherland	1841 – 1845		John Tyler
William Pitt Lynde	1845 – 1848	Elected to U.S. House	James K. Polk

== District of Wisconsin ==
U.S. Attorney	Years	Notes	President(s)
Thomas W. Sutherland	1848		James K. Polk
A. Hyatt Smith	1848 – 1849		James K. Polk
George W. Lakin	1850 – 1853		Zachary Taylor
George W. Lakin	1850 – 1853		Millard Fillmore
John R. Sharpstein	1853 – 1857	Later Justice of the Supreme Court of California	Franklin Pierce
Don A. J. Upham	1857 – 1861		James Buchanan
John B. D. Cogswell	1861 – 1866		Abraham Lincoln
John B. D. Cogswell	1861 – 1866		Andrew Johnson

== Eastern and Western District ==
U.S. Attorney, Western Dist.	Years	Notes	President(s)	U.S. Attorney, Eastern Dist.	Years	Notes
Charles M. Webb	1870 – 1878		Ulysses S. Grant	Levi Hubbell	1870 – 1875	
Charles M. Webb	1870 – 1878		Ulysses S. Grant	Gerry Whiting Hazelton	1876 – 1885	
Charles M. Webb	1870 – 1878		Rutherford B. Hayes	Gerry Whiting Hazelton	1876 – 1885	
H. M. Lewis	1878 – 1886		Rutherford B. Hayes	Gerry Whiting Hazelton	1876 – 1885	
H. M. Lewis	1878 – 1886		James A. Garfield	Gerry Whiting Hazelton	1876 – 1885	
H. M. Lewis	1878 – 1886		Chester A. Arthur	Gerry Whiting Hazelton	1876 – 1885	
H. M. Lewis	1878 – 1886		Grover Cleveland	Arthur K. Delaney	1885 – 1887	
Allen R. Bushnell	1886 – 1890		Grover Cleveland	Arthur K. Delaney	1885 – 1887	
Allen R. Bushnell	1886 – 1890		Grover Cleveland	William A. Walker	1887 – 1890	
Allen R. Bushnell	1886 – 1890		Benjamin Harrison	William A. Walker	1887 – 1890	
Samuel A. Harper	1890 – 1894		Benjamin Harrison	Elihu Colman	1890 – 1893	
Samuel A. Harper	1890 – 1894		Grover Cleveland	John H. M. Wigman	1893 – 1897	
Harry E. Briggs	1894 – 1898		Grover Cleveland	John H. M. Wigman	1893 – 1897	
Harry E. Briggs	1894 – 1898		William McKinley	Milton E. Phillips	1897 – 1901	
David F. Jones	1898 – 1901		William McKinley	Milton E. Phillips	1897 – 1901	
William G. Wheeler	1901 – 1909		Theodore Roosevelt	H. K. Butterfield	1901 – 1910	
George H. Gordon	1909 – 1913		William Howard Taft	H. K. Butterfield	1901 – 1910	
George H. Gordon	1909 – 1913		William Howard Taft	E. A. Henning	1910 – 1911	
George H. Gordon	1909 – 1913		William Howard Taft	Guy D. Goff	1911 – 1915	Later U.S. Senator
John A. Aylward	1913 – 1916		Woodrow Wilson	Guy D. Goff	1911 – 1915	Later U.S. Senator
John A. Aylward	1913 – 1916		Woodrow Wilson	H. A. Sawyer	1915 – 1923	
Arthur Mulberger	1916		Woodrow Wilson	H. A. Sawyer	1915 – 1923	
William F. Wolfe	1916 – 1917		Woodrow Wilson	H. A. Sawyer	1915 – 1923	
Albert C. Wolfe	1917 – 1921		Woodrow Wilson	H. A. Sawyer	1915 – 1923	
William H. Dougherty	1921 – 1927		Warren G. Harding	H. A. Sawyer	1915 – 1923	
William H. Dougherty	1921 – 1927		Warren G. Harding	Edward W. Miller	1923	
William H. Dougherty	1921 – 1927		Calvin Coolidge	William O. Meilahm	1923	
William H. Dougherty	1921 – 1927		Calvin Coolidge	Roy L. Morse	1923 – 1927	
Stanley M. Ryan	1927 – 1935	Grandfather of Paul Ryan	Calvin Coolidge	Levi H. Bancroft	1927 – 1932	
Stanley M. Ryan	1927 – 1935	Grandfather of Paul Ryan	Herbert Hoover	Levi H. Bancroft	1927 – 1932	
Stanley M. Ryan	1927 – 1935	Grandfather of Paul Ryan	Herbert Hoover	Edward J. Gehl	1932 – 1933	
Stanley M. Ryan	1927 – 1935	Grandfather of Paul Ryan	Franklin D. Roosevelt	Bert Husting	1933 – 1944	
John J. Boyle	1935 – 1944	Died in office	Franklin D. Roosevelt	Bert Husting	1933 – 1944	
Charles H. Cashin	1944 – 1951		Franklin D. Roosevelt	Timothy T. Cronin	1944 – 1955	
Charles H. Cashin	1944 – 1951		Harry S. Truman	Timothy T. Cronin	1944 – 1955	
Thomas E. Fairchild	1951 – 1952	Later Chief Judge of the U.S. 7th Circuit	Harry S. Truman	Timothy T. Cronin	1944 – 1955	
Frank Nikolay	1952 – 1953		Harry S. Truman	Timothy T. Cronin	1944 – 1955	
George E. Rapp	1953 – 1962		Dwight D. Eisenhower	Timothy T. Cronin	1944 – 1955	
George E. Rapp	1953 – 1962		Dwight D. Eisenhower	Edward G. Minor	1955 – 1961	
George E. Rapp	1953 – 1962		John F. Kennedy	James B. Brennan	1961 – 1969	
Nathan Heffernan	1962 – 1965	Later Chief Justice of the Wisconsin Supreme Court	John F. Kennedy	James B. Brennan	1961 – 1969	
Nathan Heffernan	1962 – 1965	Later Chief Justice of the Wisconsin Supreme Court	Lyndon B. Johnson	James B. Brennan	1961 – 1969	
Michael J. Wyngaard	1965 – 1969		Lyndon B. Johnson	James B. Brennan	1961 – 1969	
Edmond A. Nix	1969		Richard Nixon	David J. Cannon	1969 – 1973	
John O. Olson	1969 – 1974		Richard Nixon	David J. Cannon	1969 – 1973	
John O. Olson	1969 – 1974		Richard Nixon	David B. Bukey	1973 – 1974	
Steven C. Underwood	1974		Richard Nixon	David B. Bukey	1973 – 1974	
David C. Mebane	1974 – 1977		Gerald Ford	William J. Mulligan	1974 – 1978	
Frank M. Tuerkheimer	1977 – 1981		Jimmy Carter	William J. Mulligan	1974 – 1978	
Frank M. Tuerkheimer	1977 – 1981		Jimmy Carter	Joan F. Kessler	1978 – 1981	First female U.S. Attorney for Wisconsin
John R. Byrnes	1981 – 1987		Ronald Reagan	Joseph Peter Stadtmueller	1981 – 1987	
Patrick J. Fiedler	1987 – 1991	Resigned to become secretary of the Wisconsin Department of Corrections	Ronald Reagan	Patricia J. Gorence	1987 – 1988	
Patrick J. Fiedler	1987 – 1991	Resigned to become secretary of the Wisconsin Department of Corrections	Ronald Reagan	John E. Fryatt	1988 – 1993	
Patrick J. Fiedler	1987 – 1991	Resigned to become secretary of the Wisconsin Department of Corrections	George H. W. Bush	John E. Fryatt	1988 – 1993	
Kevin C. Potter	1991 – 1993		George H. W. Bush	John E. Fryatt	1988 – 1993	
Peg Lautenschlager	1993 – 2001		Bill Clinton	Thomas Paul Schneider	1993 – 2001	
J. B. Van Hollen	2001 – 2006		George W. Bush	Steven M. Biskupic	2001 – 2009	
Erik C. Peterson	2006 – 2010		George W. Bush	Steven M. Biskupic	2001 – 2009	
Erik C. Peterson	2006 – 2010		Barack Obama	James Santelle	2009 – 2015	
John W. Vaudreuil	2010 – 2017		Barack Obama	James Santelle	2009 – 2015	
John W. Vaudreuil	2010 – 2017		Barack Obama	Gregory Haanstad	2015 – 2017	
Scott Blader	2017 – 2021		Donald Trump	Matthew Krueger	2017 – 2021	
Timothy M. O'Shea	2021–2025	Acting	Joe Biden	Richard G. Frohling	2021 – 2022	Acting
Timothy M. O'Shea	2021–2025	Acting	Joe Biden	Gregory Haanstad	2022–2025	
Timothy M. O'Shea	2021–2025	Acting	Donald Trump	Richard G. Frohling	2025	Acting
Chadwick M. Elgersma	2025	Acting	Donald Trump	Brad Schimel	2025	Interim
