= E. Michael McCann =

American lawyer

Milwaukee County District Attorney
- In office January 1, 1969 – January 1, 2007
- Preceded by: David J. Cannon
- Succeeded by: John T. Chisholm

Personal details
- Born: Edward Michael McCann; 1936 (age 89–90) Chicago, Illinois

Edward Michael McCann (born 1936) is an American attorney and politician who served as district attorney of Milwaukee County, Wisconsin from 1969 to 2007. A Democrat, McCann gained recognition for the length of his tenure and his successful record as a trial attorney.

== Early life and political career ==
McCann was born in Chicago, Illinois, attended Milwaukee's St. Francis de Sales Preparatory School and graduated from Marquette University High School before receiving his bachelor's degree from the University of Detroit. He attended the Georgetown University Law Center and received an LLM degree from Harvard University. Following his graduation, McCann served as a prosecutor in the Milwaukee County District Attorney's office, working under district attorneys William J. McCauley and Hugh R. O'Connell and handling criminal appeals heard by the Wisconsin Supreme Court.

After an unsuccessful bid for a Milwaukee County Children's Court judgeship in 1968, McCann resigned from his position as a prosecutor to challenge District Attorney David J. Cannon, a Republican who had been appointed by Governor Warren Knowles to fill a vacancy in the office. McCann defeated Milwaukee attorney Gerald P. Boyle for the Democratic nomination and unseated Cannon in the fall general election. McCann was reelected in 1970, defeating Republican Thomas Doherty, formerly Cannon's deputy district attorney.

In 1976, while serving as district attorney, McCann ran for Milwaukee County Executive but was defeated by Bill O'Donnell, chairman of the Milwaukee County Board of Supervisors. In 1984, McCann ran in a special election for Wisconsin's 4th congressional district but was defeated in the Democratic primary by state Senator Jerry Kleczka.

== Tenure as district attorney ==
McCann prosecuted numerous high-profile cases during his tenure as district attorney, with a high rate of success. In 1991, he obtained the conviction of Jeffrey Dahmer, a cannibalistic serial killer and rapist (McCann's former primary opponent, Gerald P. Boyle, was Dahmer's defense attorney). In 1990, McCann prosecuted construction contractor S.A. Healy for reckless homicide in connection with workplace deaths in 1988. McCann also conducted a reckless homicide prosecution against Chem-Bio Corporation, a medical laboratory which had failed to detect cervical cancer in patients who later died of the disease. As a special prosecutor, McCann investigated but did not prosecute Winnebago County Coroner Michael Stelter, who was accused of negligence in conducting autopsies and reviewing deaths.

A devout Catholic, McCann was criticized in 2010 for perceived inaction on Catholic Church sexual abuse cases reported to his office in the 1970s, including the case of highly prolific abuser Lawrence C. Murphy. McCann contested these allegations, asserting that he had properly prosecuted clergy members accused of abuse.

McCann's relationship with both the Milwaukee Police Department and its officers' union, the Milwaukee Police Association, was fraught throughout his tenure. In 1976, the Milwaukee Sentinel reported that many Milwaukee police officers viewed McCann as "not tough enough on criminals and too tough on cops". In 1981, McCann conducted an inquest into the death in custody of African-American Milwaukee resident Ernest Lacy, ultimately charging several police officers; in response, the police union launched an abortive attempt to recall McCann. McCann harshly criticized police department practices associated with the Lacy case, stating that the predominantly white makeup of the department's tactical squad was "breeding distrust among the minority population" in Milwaukee. In 2006, McCann prosecuted three white Milwaukee officers for the beating of Frank Jude, an African-American man accused of stealing a police badge at an off-duty officer's housewarming party. The officers were acquitted; although each was later convicted in federal court, McCann was again criticized by the union, which demanded his resignation. The trial marked the first occasion on which McCann lost a felony jury trial.

After considering retirement in 2004, McCann decided not to seek reelection in 2006, instead supporting the successful candidacy of assistant district attorney John T. Chisholm. Following his departure from office in January 2007, McCann joined Marquette University Law School, where he became a Boden Teaching Fellow and adjunct professor of law. Since 2007, McCann has served as an active member of the state governing board of Common Cause in Wisconsin, the state's largest non-partisan political reform advocacy organization.
