= Kent Lovern =

21st century American lawyer and politician

Milwaukee County District Attorney
- Incumbent
- Assumed office January 6, 2025
- Preceded by: John T. Chisholm

Personal details
- Born: 1970 (age 55–56)
- Party: Democratic
- Spouse: Susan Hanna (m. 1995)
- Children: 2
- Education: Briar Cliff University; University of Iowa College of Law (J.D.)
- Profession: Lawyer
- Website: Campaign website

Kent Leroy Lovern (born c.1971) is an American lawyer and Democratic politician from Milwaukee County, Wisconsin. He is the district attorney of Milwaukee County since 2025. Prior to his election as district attorney, Lovern worked 27 years as a prosecutor in Milwaukee County, serving 9 years as an assistant district attorney and 18 years as a deputy district attorney.

== Early life and education ==
Lovern was raised in Wichita, Kansas, and Sioux City, Iowa, graduating from Bishop Heelan Catholic High School in 1989. He went on to Briar Cliff University, also in Sioux City, where he earned his bachelor's degree in 1993. He continued his education at the University of Iowa College of Law, and received his J.D. in 1995.

== Legal career ==
Shortly after completing his education, Lovern moved to Racine, Wisconsin, where he worked as criminal defense attorney. In 1998, he was hired as an assistant district attorney under Milwaukee County district attorney E. Michael McCann. During that time, he worked in the Firearms Enforcement Unit led by supervising assistant district attorney John T. Chisholm. In 2006, Chisholm was elected district attorney, and, in 2007, he appointed Lovern as a deputy district attorney.

A year later, Lovern was promoted to chief deputy district attorney, the second-ranking position in the office. He served in that role until Chisholm's retirement in 2025. In 2021, he was one of five finalists for appointment as United States Attorney for the Eastern District of Wisconsin, but President Joe Biden, ultimately appointed former interim U.S. attorney Gregory Haanstad.

== District attorney ==
On January 5, 2024, district attorney John Chisholm announced that he would not run for re-election. Five days later, Lovern announced his candidacy to succeed Chisholm as district attorney. Chisholm immediately endorsed Lovern's candidacy, as did Milwaukee's U.S. representative Gwen Moore and Milwaukee mayor Cavalier Johnson. Lovern faced no opposition in the Democratic primary or the general election. He assumed office on January 6, 2025, and had a ceremonial swearing in at the Milwaukee County Courthouse on January 16, 2025, with chief judge Carl Ashley administering the oath.

== Personal life and family ==
On August 26, 1995, Kent Lovern married Susan E. Hanna at Sioux City, Iowa. They now reside in Shorewood, Wisconsin, and have two sons.

Legal offices
Preceded by John T. Chisholm	District Attorney of Milwaukee County; January 6, 2025 – present	Incumbent
