= Georgia Thompson =

Wisconsin civil servant wrongfully convicted of federal corruption charges

Georgia L. Thompson (born c. 1950) is a Wisconsin civil servant who was wrongfully convicted of federal corruption charges in 2006, then exonerated by an appeals court in 2007.

Thompson is a Madison native, and graduated from Madison East High School in 1968. She was one of ten children; her father was a painter for the University of Wisconsin–Madison, and her mother was a janitor for the Department of Administration. She worked in the travel industry for 27 years, and lived in Waunakee. Thompson was hired in 2001 into the civil service by the state Department of Administration, when Republican Scott McCallum was Governor. Thompson was described as "apolitical", hard-working, and "intensely private".

== Travel contract controversy ==
In 2005, Thompson was on a panel considering competitive bids for a state travel contract worth up to $250,000 annually over three years. The contract was awarded to Adelman Travel, whose bid was lower than the other finalist, Omega Travel of Virginia, although Omega's bid scored higher on a point formula used by the department. It emerged that during the 2006 re-election campaign of Democratic Gov. Jim Doyle, two Adelman executives including owner Craig Adelman had each contributed $10,000 to the Doyle campaign, even though in previous years, including Doyle's first gubernatorial campaign, they had never given more than $1,000.

In January 2006, Thompson was indicted on charges that she steered the contract to Adelman as a reward for its campaign contributions. According to the indictment, Thompson "intentionally inflated her scores for Adelman and suggested that other committee members do the same." After Omega still came out ahead, the indictment said, Thompson convinced the panel to do a "best and final" bid round between just the two companies, which Adelman won. Thompson was indicted on two felony counts, misapplication of funds and fraud. Later that month, Gov. Doyle cancelled the Adelman contract, but the campaign did not return the contributions.

In June 2006, a federal jury convicted Thompson of both felony counts. According to United States Attorney Steven Biskupic, although there was no "pay to play" deal alleged, the contributions were part of an overall scheme that constituted honest services fraud. Trial testimony showed that Doyle and his aide Marc Marotta had meetings and phone contacts with Adelman executives during the bidding period; according to Doyle's top aide Steve Bablitch, no connection with the Governor was shown at trial. Members of the committee also testified that Thompson had told them that the contract needed to go to Adelman for "political reasons." Doyle and Marotta were not charged. According to Doyle, Thompson acted on her own, and prosecutor Biskupic said the case was about "Georgia Thompson and Georgia Thompson alone." Thompson had resigned her position before Doyle could fire her. Although Thompson faced a maximum of 20 years in federal prison, she was sentenced by U.S. District Judge Rudolph T. Randa to 18 months.

The conviction led to heated charges in the 2006 gubernatorial campaign, with Republican candidate Mark Green proposing ethical reforms if elected and pro-Green political groups running television ads criticizing Doyle and tying him to Thompson. Democratic Party state chair Joe Wineke called the attacks "dishonest" and "hypocritical" and said that they were an attempt to distract voters from campaign contribution problems of Green.

=== Conviction reversed ===
A panel of judges from the United States Court of Appeals for the Seventh Circuit immediately reversed Thompson's conviction on hearing oral arguments in the case on April 5, 2007. Without waiting until completion of a written decision, the judges ordered that Thompson be released from Federal Correctional Institution, Pekin in Pekin, Illinois without delay. Judge Diane Wood called the prosecution's evidence "beyond thin." During oral arguments, the judges had pointedly questioned the Assistant U.S. Attorney defending the appeal, asking why Doyle or Adelman were not prosecuted, one asking, "Am I missing something?" Of the bid-scoring formula, another opined, "Because they flunked high school math doesn't mean a felony was committed." Gov. Doyle, on hearing the news, said she was entitled to her job back, and said he looked forward to meeting her for the first time.

According to her attorney, the prosecution and conviction cost Thompson over $300,000, including lost pay, her savings, her condo, and her pension, which she cashed in to pay for her legal defense. Democrats asked whether U.S. Attorney Biskupic was pressured by the White House or the Justice Department to prosecute Democrats, as other U.S. Attorneys allegedly were in the Bush administration Dismissal of U.S. attorneys controversy. Jurors defended their verdict, and some Democrats, including former Wisconsin Attorney General Peg Lautenschlager, who conducted a parallel investigation, said that Biskupic was not politically motivated. Thompson made no statement to the media.

On April 10, Congresswoman Tammy Baldwin of Madison called on her colleagues to investigate the Thompson case as part of the overall U.S. Attorneys dismissal controversy. The Senate Judiciary Committee delivered a letter to United States Attorney General Alberto Gonzales asking for documents in the case.

The Court of Appeals issued its written opinion in United States v. Thompson on April 20, 2007. The Wisconsin Department of Administration also announced that Thompson had been reinstated at her old salary but in a different job, and she would receive back pay dating from her resignation. She would also be eligible for reimbursement for legal expenses, but she would have to file a claim. By March 5, 2008, both houses of the state legislature voted without dissent to reimburse Thompson $228,792 in legal expenses.

== Awards and recognition ==
In 2008, after returning to her state job, Thompson was recognized with an Honorable Mention for the Virginia Hart Special Recognition Award from the Office of State Employee Relations, a privately funded award given each year "for exemplary performance and contribution to the citizens of the state."

== See also ==
- List of wrongful convictions in the United States
