= David J. Cannon =

American lawyer

United States Attorney for the Eastern District of Wisconsin
- In office July 11, 1969 – November 16, 1973
- Preceded by: James B. Brennan
- Succeeded by: David B. Bukey (acting)

Milwaukee County District Attorney
- In office April 29, 1968 – January 1, 1969
- Preceded by: Hugh R. O'Connell
- Succeeded by: E. Michael McCann

Personal details
- Born: August 6, 1933 Milwaukee, Wisconsin
- Died: July 26, 2011 (aged 77) Elm Grove, Wisconsin
- Party: Democratic

David J. Cannon (August 6, 1933 – July 26, 2011) was an American attorney who served as Milwaukee County District Attorney from 1968 to 1969 and as United States Attorney for the Eastern District of Wisconsin from 1969 to 1973. Cannon was the last Republican to serve as Milwaukee County District Attorney.

== Early life and career ==
Cannon was born in Milwaukee and attended Marquette University High School. He graduated from Marquette University in 1955 before serving in the United States Army's Security Agency. In 1960, Cannon received his law degree from Marquette University Law School and entered private practice. He gained notoriety for successfully challenging the authority of Wisconsin district attorneys and Milwaukee County's corporation counsel to issue arrest warrants in child support cases. In 1966, he was hired as a Milwaukee County prosecutor by District Attorney Hugh O'Connell. When O'Connell was elected to the Milwaukee County Circuit Court in April 1968, Republican Governor Warren Knowles appointed Cannon to succeed him.

== Tenure in public office and later career ==
As district attorney, Cannon sought to modernize the office's technology and to redirect its resources against white-collar crime. He prosecuted John Oraa Tucker, a Milwaukee man accused of fatally shooting a police officer during the city's 1967 civil unrest; although Tucker was convicted of several related felonies, he was acquitted of homicide. Additionally, Cannon faced an uphill election battle in the fall of 1968, facing Democrat E. Michael McCann, a former assistant district attorney. In the November general election, McCann defeated Cannon with a margin of approximately 12,000 votes.

In 1969, President Richard Nixon nominated Cannon to serve as United States Attorney for the Eastern District of Wisconsin, replacing James B. Brennan. Cannon's nomination was confirmed by the United States Senate in June 1969 and he took office in July. While in office, Cannon pursued federal charges in connection to an incident of draft-card burning in 1968 and conducted a grand jury investigation into the activities of the Balistrieri underworld family. Cannon resigned from office on November 16, 1973 and returned permanently to private practice.

Cannon practiced law in Milwaukee with the firm Michael Best & Friedrich LLP, working to expand the firm's litigation section. He also served as president of the Milwaukee Bar Association in the early 1980s and chaired the board of Federal Defender Services of Wisconsin. Cannon died of lung cancer on July 26, 2011.
