= Herbert Steffes =

American judge

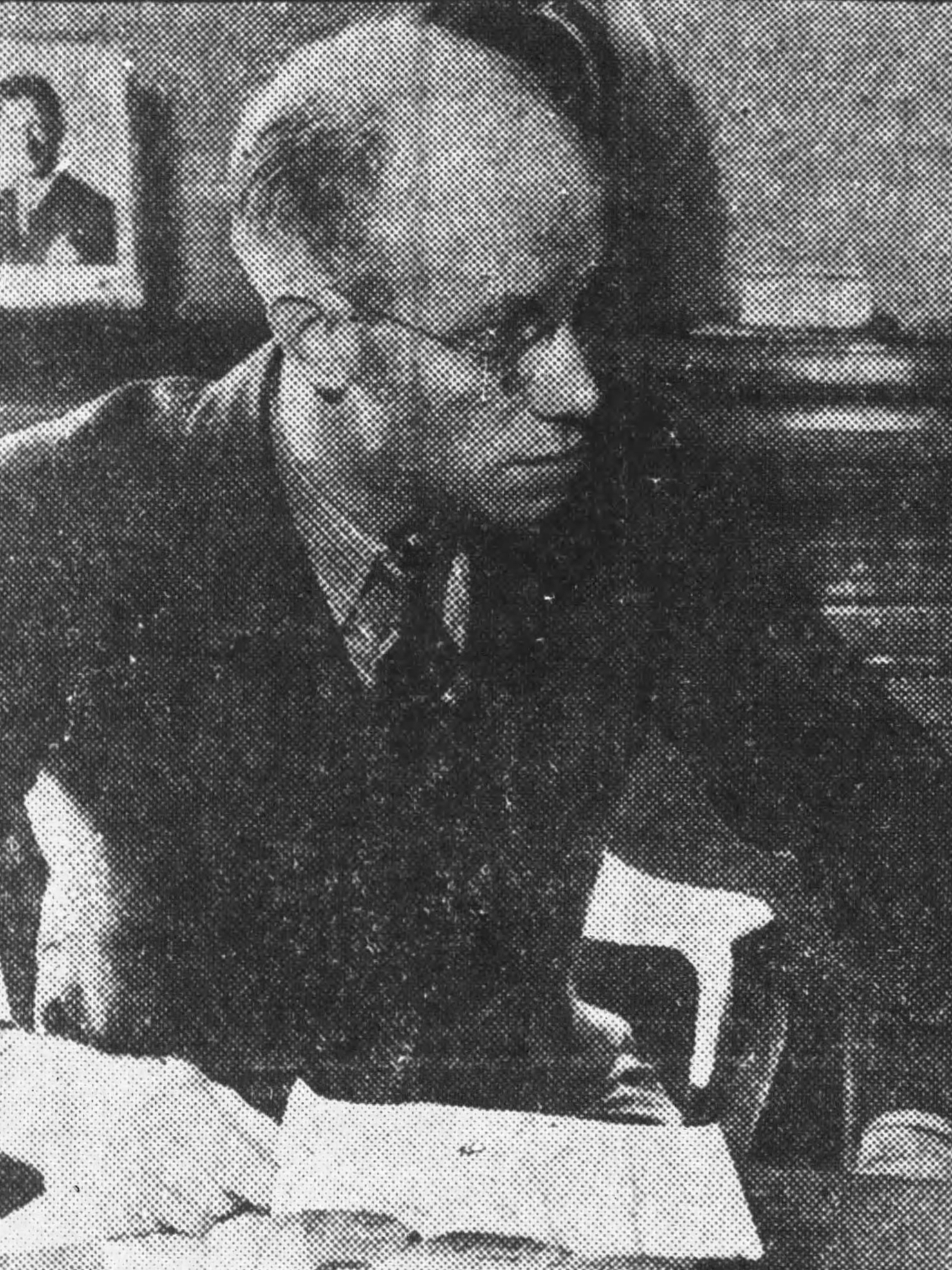
Steffes in 1938

Herbert J. Steffes (June 18, 1904 – July 19, 1975) was an American jurist who served as Milwaukee County District Attorney from 1936 to 1944 and as a criminal court judge in Milwaukee from 1944 to 1974.

== Life and career ==
Born in Milwaukee, Steffes attended South Division High School before graduating from Marquette University and the Marquette University Law School. He worked as a private practice attorney in Milwaukee and was a founding member of the Wisconsin Progressive Party in 1934. In 1936, Steffes challenged Milwaukee County District Attorney William Zabel on a joint Progressive–Socialist ticket. Zabel was reelected but died fifteen minutes prior to the closing of polls on Election Day, prompting Progressive Governor Philip La Follette to appoint Steffes as district attorney. Although Steffes earned more votes than any other Progressive candidate when he was elected to a full term in 1938, he angered the party establishment by prosecuting LaFollette's executive secretary, Thomas Duncan, on charges of vehicular manslaughter. In 1940, Steffes broke from the Progressives and was reelected on the Republican ticket; he was again reelected as a Republican in 1942. While district attorney, Steffes employed Charles J. Kersten as a prosecutor; Kersten was later elected United States Representative for Wisconsin's 5th congressional district.

In 1944, Republican Governor Walter Goodland appointed Steffes to the Milwaukee County Municipal Court, the county's felony trial court. In 1955, Steffes was nominated to a judgeship on the United States District Court for the Eastern District of Wisconsin by President Dwight D. Eisenhower but withdrew his name from consideration. While his nomination was pending, Steffes was reelected to the Municipal Court, handily defeating Democratic District Attorney William J. McCauley. Steffes served on the court until 1962, when it was merged with the criminal division of the Milwaukee County Circuit Court; he served as a circuit judge until his retirement in 1974. He died of a pulmonary embolism one year later, on July 19, 1975.
