= John T. Chisholm =

American prosecutor and politician

Milwaukee County District Attorney
- In office January 8, 2007 – January 5, 2025
- Preceded by: E. Michael McCann
- Succeeded by: Kent Lovern

Personal details
- Born: John Theodore Chisholm; March 14, 1963 (age 63) Milwaukee, Wisconsin, U.S.
- Party: Democratic
- Spouse: Colleen Chisholm
- Children: Ted Chisholm

John Theodore Chisholm (born March 14, 1963) is an American prosecutor and politician from Wisconsin who served as the Milwaukee County District Attorney from 2007 to 2025. A career prosecutor, Chisholm specialized in complex conspiracy prosecutions before his election as district attorney in 2006.

As district attorney, Chisholm garnered notoriety for two inquiries he led into staff misconduct and potential campaign finance violations surrounding Wisconsin Governor Scott Walker. Chisholm received national attention surrounding his enactment of progressive justice reform policies in Milwaukee County, including criticism in light of the Waukesha Christmas parade attack in which six people were killed (ages 8 to 81) by freed repeat offender Durrell Brooks.

== Biography ==
Chisholm was born in Milwaukee and raised in suburban Waukesha County. He graduated from Marquette University High School in 1981 and attended St. John's University before graduating from Marquette University in 1986.

Chisholm was commissioned in the United States Army in 1986 and was honorably discharged as a first lieutenant in 1990. In 1994, Chisholm graduated from the University of Wisconsin Law School and joined the office of Milwaukee County District Attorney E. Michael McCann as a misdemeanor prosecutor. From 1994 until 1999, Chisholm prosecuted misdemeanors, domestic violence offenses, and complex narcotics cases in the Milwaukee County Circuit Court.

In 1999, McCann appointed Chisholm as supervising attorney of the Firearms Enforcement Unit, which prosecuted high-profile cases involving organized crime, large-scale drug trafficking, and non-fatal shootings. In this position, Chisholm prosecuted millionaire marijuana dealer Kenneth L. Green and members of Jamaican and Latin Kings organized crime outfits. As supervising attorney, Chisholm was highly regarded by law enforcement officials for his skill and successful track record in prosecuting gun crime.

== Political career ==
In 2005, then-District Attorney McCann announced that he would not seek reelection in the following year's Democratic primary. Chisholm, then serving as supervising attorney of the Firearms Enforcement Unit, declared his candidacy for the position. Chisholm won 65% of the vote in the September Democratic primary, defeating former Milwaukee Alderwoman Larraine McNamara-McGraw. Chisholm defeated independent candidate Lew Wasserman in the November general election, winning over 82% of the vote.

Chisholm was unopposed in his 2008 and 2012 reelection bids. In 2013, he was mentioned as a potential Democratic candidate for Attorney General of Wisconsin, but he ultimately did not seek the office.

In 2016, Chisholm was opposed in the Democratic primary by Verona Swanigan, an attorney who conducted a general legal practice in Milwaukee. Swanigan's campaign was funded by Republican activists who opposed Chisholm's role in the John Doe probes of Governor Scott Walker's campaign. Chisholm defeated Swanigan in the August 9 primary, winning over 65% of the vote, and faced no opposition in the November general election.

In 2017, it was speculated that Chisholm would challenge either Gov. Scott Walker in the 2018 gubernatorial election or Attorney General Brad Schimel for his seat. Chisholm declined to run for either position, instead endorsing Milwaukee attorney Matt Flynn for governor and ex-federal prosecutor Josh Kaul for attorney general.

== Tenure as district attorney ==
As district attorney, Chisholm established a public integrity unit, resulting in the prosecution of Milwaukee alderman Michael McGee, Jr., who was later convicted of federal crimes including bribery and extortion. McGee was also convicted of two state crimes, to which he pleaded nolo contendere. Chisholm's office has prosecuted other officials, including Milwaukee County supervisor Toni Clark and fellow supervisor Johnny Thomas, a candidate for Milwaukee City Comptroller who was prosecuted in 2012 for bribery but acquitted at trial.

In October 2012, Chisholm charged four Milwaukee police officers with crimes ranging from sexual assault to misconduct in public office for their involvement in the unlawful rectal probing of detained suspects. Michael Vagnini, the officer most implicated in the illegal searches, was sentenced to 26 months in state prison.

Chisholm investigated and prosecuted violent felons, including preacher and organized crime figure Michael Lock and serial killer Walter E. Ellis, known as the "North Side Strangler" who targeted prostitutes in Milwaukee for two decades.

Chisholm is a director and past chair of the Association of Prosecuting Attorneys, a national organization of American prosecutors. In an interview with the Milwaukee Journal Sentinel before his election, Chisholm said: “Is there going to be an individual I divert, or I put into treatment program, who’s going to go out and kill somebody? You bet. Guaranteed. It’s guaranteed to happen. It does not invalidate the overall approach.”

On November 22, 2021, an investigation was launched into the Milwaukee DA's office’s handling of the bail setting for Darrell Brooks. Brooks was found guilty of plowing his SUV into the Waukesha Christmas parade and was subsequently charged with the intentional homicides of 5 adults and 1 child and the injuries of 68 others. Brooks had an extremely lengthy criminal history. He was alleged to have punched a woman in the face and hit her with his car when he was released on $1,000 bail two days before the Christmas parade. The bail was described by the Milwaukee County District Attorney's Office as "inappropriately low in light of the nature of the recent charges." Several Republican state legislators have called on Chisholm to resign or be removed from his post by Governor Tony Evers.

=== John Doe probes into certain staffers of Governor Scott Walker ===
In 2010, Chisholm conducted a confidential "John Doe" investigation into financial and political misconduct on the part of staff and campaign supporters of politician Scott Walker, then the Milwaukee County Executive and a successful candidate for Governor of Wisconsin.

The investigation resulted in four felony convictions, including those of Timothy Russell and Kelly Rindfleisch, who had served successively as Walker's deputy chief of staff. During the course of this investigation, Chisholm initiated a second John Doe probe, investigating potential violations of Wisconsin's campaign finance laws during the 2012 gubernatorial recall election. Due to the geographic breadth of this investigation, Chisholm and four other Wisconsin district attorneys turned over its management to former Assistant United States Attorney Francis Schmitz.

Many, including conservative activists, alleged that this investigation, which was permanently halted by the Wisconsin Supreme Court on June 16, 2015, was a partisan undertaking against Walker's supporters. This claim was reiterated by Michael Lutz, who served as a short-term special prosecutor in Chisholm's office and who claimed to have been a close friend of the Chisholm family. Lutz alleged that Chisholm's investigation was motivated by his wife, Colleen, a public school teacher and union steward. Chisholm's attorney, Samuel Leib, denounced this claim as "scurrilous, desperate, and just plain cheap." Lutz committed suicide in 2015.

Eric O'Keefe, among others, sued and filed complaints against Chisholm, in both federal and Wisconsin courts, alleging the commission of civil rights violations during the course of the investigation. The United States Court of Appeals for the Seventh Circuit dismissed a federal civil rights claim but did not restart the investigation, pending litigation in state court ultimately resolved in 2015.

Following the federal court ruling, conservative activist Chris Kliesmet requested that a Dodge County prosecutor and circuit judge probe Chisholm's conduct during the second investigation. The judge, Steven Bauer, a Democrat who had run unsuccessfully for the Wisconsin State Assembly in 2012, determined, on November 6, 2014, that Chisholm had acted "in good faith" and noted the campaign finance laws used as the investigation's basis "were and are arguably still enforceable", depending on the outcome of appellate litigation in state court.

In July 2015, the Wisconsin State Supreme Court ended Chisholm's probe. Justice Michael Gableman, writing for the majority, stated, "It is utterly clear that the prosecutor has employed theories of law that do not exist in order to investigate citizens who were wholly innocent of any wrongdoing." Chisholm appealed the court's decision to the U.S. Supreme Court. On October 3, 2016, the court rejected his request to hear the case.

On December 7, 2017, the Wisconsin Department of Justice issued a report criticizing what it described as the "breathtaking" scope of the John Doe investigation. It stated that the investigators obtained the personal email account details, including passwords, of 35 Republican politicians and aides, and hundreds of thousands of emails, including emails to Republicans Senator Ron Johnson, GOP chair Reince Priebus, and Congressman Sean Duffy. The emails also included 150 personal emails between Wisconsin State Senator Leah Vukmir and her daughter, including health information, which were placed into a folder labeled "opposition research".
