= United States v. Olofson =

US v. Olofson
- Court: United States Court of Appeals for the Seventh Circuit
- Full case name: United States of America v. David Olofson
- Argued: January 22 2009
- Decided: May 01 2009
- Citation: 563 F.3d 652; 2009 U.S. App. LEXIS 9433

Case history
- Prior history: Guilty verdict on May 15, 2008, following jury trial in Case No. 06-CR-320 (E.D. Wis.)
- Subsequent history: Certiorari denied, October 13, 2009, in US Supreme Court, Case No. 09–256, David Olofson v. United States.

Holding
- Conviction affirmed. The defendant's proffered jury instruction was not a correct statement of the law, and the district court properly rejected it. Furthermore, the evidence presented at trial was sufficient to sustain Olofson's conviction, and 18 U.S.C. §§ 922(o) and 924(a)(2) are not unconstitutionally vague as applied to the facts of this case. In addition, the district court did not abuse its discretion in either excluding the defendant's firearms expert from the courtroom during the government expert's testimony or in denying Olofson's motion to compel the production of evidence he had requested from the government.

Court membership
- Judges sitting: Daniel Anthony Manion, Michael Stephen Kanne, and Virginia Mary Kendall

Case opinions
- Majority: Manion, joined by Kanne and Kendall

Laws applied
- 18 U.S.C. § 922(o); 18 U.S.C. § 924(a)(2); 26 U.S.C. § 5845(b); Staples v. United States, 511 U.S. 600

United States v. Olofson, 563 F.3d 652 (2009), is an appellate decision in the case of David Olofson, who was convicted by a jury of knowingly transferring a machine gun in violation of 18 U.S.C. § 922(o). Olofson was sentenced to thirty months in prison, which he began serving after his appeal to the United States Court of Appeals for the Seventh Circuit failed. The US Supreme Court declined to hear a further appeal. Olofson's case was, for a time, a minor cause célèbre in conservative media and among gun rights advocates, attracting support from, among others, Lou Dobbs of CNN and from Oath Keepers, and legal assistance from Gun Owners of America.

== Facts of case and pre-trial proceedings ==
On July 13, 2006, US Army Reservist David Olofson of Berlin, Wisconsin, lent an AR-15 rifle to Robert Kiernicki, who took the gun to a local shooting range. The firing selector switch on the rifle had three positions: "Fire," "Safety," and a third, unmarked position. While at the range Kiernicki switched the AR-15's firing selector to the third position and pulled the trigger. The gun discharged three or four rounds and then jammed; Kiernicki did this several times with the rifle jamming each time. Following a telephone complaint of automatic gunfire, Berlin police showed up at the range, and after questioning Kiernicki, confiscated Olofson's AR-15 and contacted the Bureau of Alcohol, Tobacco, Firearms, and Explosives (ATF) about the incident.

On July 19, 2006, ATF agents, Berlin police officers, and the Green Lake County Sheriff's Department SWAT team carried out a warranted search of Olofson's home. During the course of the search, Olofson spoke with law enforcement officers and acknowledged lending the AR-15 to Kiernicki.

Olofson was indicted by a federal grand jury on December 5, 2006, on charges of knowingly transferring a machine gun in violation of 18 U.S.C. § 922(o). Shortly before the trial began, Olofson filed an evidentiary motion to compel the prosecution to produce documents concerning the ATF's testing procedures, correspondence between the ATF and the manufacturer of Olofson's AR-15 regarding M-16 parts used in such rifles, and the ATF's registration history of AR-15 rifles containing M-16 parts. The trial court judge denied the motion on the first day of trial, concluding that the information sought was not exculpatory under Brady v. Maryland.

According to the testimony of Kiernicki, Olofson's purpose for lending the gun was to sell it to Kiernicki. Kiernicki also testified Olofson knew about the third automatic firing mode, but that it jammed. The prosecution also provided evidence from Olofson's computer with proof of acquiring M-16 parts, which could be used to make an AR-15 automatic. Olofson also "had contact with vigilante groups" and indicated he was "part of the sovereign movement", according to U.S. Assistant Attorney Gregory Haanstad.
