= Robert G. Dela Hunt =

American lawyer and politician

Robert G. Dela Hunt (March 20, 1912 – December 13, 1970) was an American lawyer and politician.

Born in Milwaukee, Wisconsin, Dela Hunt graduated from Marquette University High School. He then received his bachelor's degree from Marquette University and his law degree from Marquette University Law School. He practiced law in Milwaukee. Dela Hunt served in the Wisconsin State Assembly and was a Republican. Dela Hunt died of a heart attack at his home in Shorewood, Wisconsin.
