= Milwaukee County District Attorney =

State constitutional officer responsible for criminal prosecution

- Incumbent; Kent Lovern since 2025
- First holder: Charles James
- Website: county.milwaukee.gov/EN/District-Attorney

The Milwaukee County District Attorney is a state constitutional officer responsible for criminal prosecution in Milwaukee County, Wisconsin. The current district attorney is Kent Lovern, who has served since 2025.

== History ==
The first Milwaukee County District Attorney was Charles James, who served a two-year term beginning in 1848. District attorneys from then until 2008 also served two-year terms in office. Since that year, the district attorney serves for four years. The position is not, and has never been, subject to term limits.

In the first decade of the 1900s, district attorney Francis E. McGovern and his office investigated and prosecuted corrupt city officials. The administration of Mayor David Rose was notorious for this, often ignoring illegal activity. Rose, although termed by McGovern "the self-elected, self-appointed attorney general" of local crime, was not indicted but was defeated in the 1910 mayoral election by Socialist Emil Seidel.

== Responsibilities ==
The district attorney's office is responsible for prosecuting state-level criminal offenses committed in Milwaukee County. The office also prosecutes county ordinance violators. Separate units within the office prosecute offenses such as violent crimes, sexual assault, domestic violence, white-collar crimes, and drug-related crimes, among others. The office also contains a unit devoted to prosecuting misdemeanor offenses.

== Notable district attorneys ==
- Charles James was the first district attorney, serving for two years (1848–1850).
- Francis E. McGovern was responsible for the investigation and indictment of corrupt City of Milwaukee officials during David Rose's mayoral administration. McGovern was elected governor of Wisconsin in 1910.
- Herbert Steffes, a Progressive in office from 1936 to 1944, was appointed by Governor Philip La Follette after his victorious election opponent died before polls closed on Election Day. Steffes later broke from the Progressives after prosecuting La Follette's executive secretary, Thomas Duncan, on a manslaughter charge.
- William J. McCauley, district attorney from 1945 to 1964, was the longest-serving district attorney at the time of his death in office, a record since exceeded by E. Michael McCann, who McCauley hired.
- Hugh R. O'Connell, who served from 1964 to 1968, later served as a Milwaukee County circuit judge.
- David J. Cannon, district attorney from 1968 to 1969, later served as United States Attorney for the Eastern District of Wisconsin.
- E. Michael McCann, district attorney from 1969 until 2007, prosecuted serial killer Jeffrey Dahmer and off-duty police officers who battered Frank Jude, Jr.

== Employees ==
The district attorney's office is composed of about 125 assistant district attorneys, who are supervised by four deputy district attorneys and a chief deputy district attorney. The office is assisted by a relatively large support staff, and has ten investigators, who are law-enforcement officers.
