= John R. Devitt =

American lawyer and politician

John R. Devitt (August 13, 1917 – January 31, 2000) was an American lawyer and politician.

Born in Milwaukee, Wisconsin, Devitt graduated from Marquette University High School in 1935. He then received his bachelor's degree from Marquette University and his law degree from Marquette Law School. He then practiced law in Milwaukee, Wisconsin. He served in the United States Army during World War II. In 1945, Devitt served in the Wisconsin State Senate as a Republican. In 1955, Devitt served in the Milwaukee County legal office. Devitt died in Milwaukee, Wisconsin.
