= Grant Langley =

American lawyer

Grant F. Langley is an American attorney and politician who served as Milwaukee City Attorney from 1984 until 2020.

== Life and career ==
A 1970 graduate of Marquette University Law School, Langley served as an assistant Milwaukee city attorney from 1971 to 1984. As an assistant city attorney, Langley provided legal representation to the Milwaukee Fire and Police Commission and controversial Milwaukee police chief Harold A. Breier. He also represented the Milwaukee Harbor Commission and oversaw cable television contract negotiations between the city and Warner Amex Communications Company. Langley was also active in forming a union of assistant city attorneys, which often feuded with City Attorney James B. Brennan. In 1984, Langley challenged Brennan and, after a highly contentious campaign, unseated him.

Langley maintained a low public profile as City Attorney and faced electoral opposition only three times. In 2004, he handily defeated former Milwaukee County Supervisor Fred Tabak. In 2008, Langley faced state Representative Pedro Colón; Colón received considerable support, but ultimately received only 41% of the vote to Langley's 51%. Although it was initially speculated that Langley would not seek a ninth term, he did go on to re-election unopposed in 2016 and sought a tenth term in 2020. He was defeated in the 2020 election by attorney Tearman Spencer.
