= St. Martin's, Wisconsin =

Coordinates: 42°54′08″N 88°03′23″W

St. Martin's (also St. Martins or Saint Martins) is a former hamlet in the Town of Franklin, in Milwaukee County, Wisconsin, United States.

== History ==
It was settled during the 1830s and 1840s, and became more developed after the arrival of Father Martin Kundig in 1847. He established Holy Assumption Parish and was a key force in platting the settlement in 1850. Because some German immigrants had trouble understanding the English-speaking Irish worshipers, construction of another Catholic church was requested. A portion of the land deeded to Holy Assumption Church in St. Martin's was donated for construction of Sacred Hearts Catholic Church to accommodate the German language-speaking congregants in 1858.

A five-story windmill for grinding grain was moved from Kenosha County to St. Martins in 1868 and served farmers until it was torn down in 1934.

In Turner, Turner and Reinsch's 1898 Hand Book of Wisconsin: Its History and Geography ... and Resources, Industries, and Commerce, it is listed as having a population of 146, and is described as follows:

It has a feed mill, four general stores, a shoe shop, a blacksmiths shops, and a daily mail.

The Milwaukee Electric Railway and Light Company interurban railway had a "St. Martin's Junction" stop from 1904 to 1939. The Labor Day fair formerly held in Hales Corners was moved to St. Martin's in 1958, and is now known as the St. Martin's Fair.
