= Dick Bilda =

American football player (1919–1996)

Profile
- Position: Tailback

Personal information
- Born: May 17, 1919; Milwaukee, Wisconsin, U.S.
- Died: November 29, 1996 (aged 77); Milwaukee, Wisconsin, U.S.
- Listed height: 6 ft 2 in (1.88 m)
- Listed weight: 210 lb (95 kg)

Career information
- High school: Milwaukee (WI) Marquette Academy
- College: Marquette

Career history
- Green Bay Packers (1944)

Awards and highlights
- NFL champion (1944)
- Stats at Pro Football Reference

Richard Francis Bilda (May 17, 1919 – November 29, 1996) was an American football player. He was born in Milwaukee, Wisconsin in 1919. He attended the Marquette University High School, graduating in 1937. He is a member of the Marquette University High School Athletic Hall of Fame. A standout athlete in three sports, he later attended Marquette University, where he played football. In 1944 he was a member of the Green Bay Packers NFL Championship team when he played in three games. Bilda also played for the New York Giants.
