= Oakwood, Milwaukee County, Wisconsin =

Coordinates: 42°51′29″N 87°55′28″W

Oakwood was an unincorporated area and post office in the Town of Oak Creek in Milwaukee County, Wisconsin, United States, in the area roughly corresponding to what is now Oakwood Road between South 13th Street and South Howell Avenue (sections 29-32).

Oakwood had a train station with two daily stops and was the location of Oakwood High School from 1888 to 1971.

In Turner, Turner and Reinsch's 1898 Hand Book of Wisconsin: Its History and Geography ... and Resources, Industries, and Commerce, it is listed as having a population of 198, and is described as follows:

It has a general store, two hotels, and a blacksmith shop.
