= Hugh R. O'Connell =

20th century American lawyer and judge

The Honorable Hugh R. O'Connell

Wisconsin Circuit Court Judge for the Milwaukee Circuit, Branch 17
- In office August 1, 1978 – September 30, 1983
- Preceded by: Position established
- Succeeded by: Russell W. Stamper, Sr.

Wisconsin Circuit Court Judge for the 2nd Circuit, Branch 17
- In office June 1, 1968 – July 31, 1978
- Preceded by: Position established
- Succeeded by: Position abolished

District Attorney of Milwaukee County
- In office November 1964 – April 1968
- Appointed by: John W. Reynolds
- Preceded by: William J. McCauley
- Succeeded by: David J. Cannon

Personal details
- Born: July 22, 1919 Butler, Wisconsin
- Died: June 30, 1987 (aged 67)
- Cause of death: Spinal tumor
- Resting place: Holy Cross Cemetery; Milwaukee, Wisconsin
- Party: Democratic
- Education: Arizona State University; Marquette University Law School

Hugh R. O'Connell (July 22, 1919 – June 30, 1987) was an American attorney and judge from Wisconsin. He was a Wisconsin Circuit Court Judge in Milwaukee County from 1968 until his retirement in 1983. Earlier, he served as Milwaukee County District Attorney from 1964 to 1968.

== Early life and career ==
O'Connell was born in Butler, Wisconsin. He graduated from Arizona State College at Tempe before receiving a law degree from Marquette University Law School in 1952. Following his graduation, O'Connell worked as an attorney for Northwestern Mutual, a Milwaukee insurance company. From 1954 to 1964, O'Connell worked as a Milwaukee County prosecutor, eventually serving as a first assistant district attorney under longtime district attorney William McCauley. When McCauley died in 1964, O'Connell was named to replace him on the Democratic ticket, edging out the party's preferred candidate, Donald W. Steinmetz. O'Connell was appointed interim district attorney by Governor John W. Reynolds shortly thereafter and was elected to the office in the November general election.

== Tenure in elected office ==
O'Connell served as district attorney until 1968, when he sought election to a criminal judgeship on the Milwaukee County Circuit Court. In the general election, O'Connell faced Dominic Frinzi, a prominent attorney and politician who had represented underworld figure Frank Balistrieri; asserting his opposition to organized crime, O'Connell handily defeated Frinzi. As a judge, O'Connell was praised as a "superintellect" and as a fair decisionmaker. The Milwaukee Journal contrasted his moderate judicial philosophy favorably with the conservatism of fellow judge John L. Coffey, who was later appointed to the United States Court of Appeals for the Seventh Circuit.

Although respected as a jurist, O'Connell was criticized for his own ties to the Milwaukee underworld. In 1988, after his death, the Milwaukee Sentinel asserted that O'Connell's career had been "filled with links to crime figures", citing, among other incidents, a mob figure's recorded remarks that O'Connell was "one of the judges we've been talking to for 10 years". The Sentinel also noted that, three years after defeating Frinzi, O'Connell appointed Frank Balistrieri's son Joseph as a court commissioner.

O'Connell retired from the bench in 1983, citing his growing frustration with his criminal calendar and his desire to write spy fiction. He died four years later, in 1987, of spinal cancer.

Legal offices
Preceded by William J. McCauley	District Attorney of Milwaukee County; 1964 – 1968	Succeeded by David J. Cannon
Preceded by New branch	Wisconsin Circuit Court Judge for the 2nd Circuit, Branch 17; 1968 – 1978	Succeeded by Branch abolished
Preceded by Position established	Wisconsin Circuit Court Judge for the Milwaukee Circuit, Branch 17; 1978 – 1983	Succeeded by Russell W. Stamper, Sr.
