= Fred R. Sloan =

United States Air Force general

Fred R. Sloan is a retired major general in the United States Air National Guard and former Director of Air National Guard Forces and Air National Guard Assistant to the Commander of Air Combat Command, as well as Assistant Adjutant General of Wisconsin for the Air.

== Biography ==
Sloan was born in Milwaukee, Wisconsin and graduated from Marquette University High School in 1966. He would graduate from the University of Wisconsin-Madison in 1970 with a B.A. in Psychology.

== Career ==
Sloan joined the Wisconsin Air National Guard in 1971 and entered pilot training at Laughlin Air Force Base. He would acquire more than 6,000 hours flying in a Convair C-131 Samaritan, Lockheed T-33 Shooting Star, Cessna T-37 Tweet, Northrop T-38 Talon, Convair F-102 Delta Dagger, Cessna O-2 Skymaster, Cessna A-37 Dragonfly, Fairchild Republic A-10 Thunderbolt II, and General Dynamics F-16 Fighting Falcon.

Awards he has received include the Legion of Merit, the Meritorious Service Medal, the Air Force Commendation Medal, the Air Force Achievement Medal, the Air Force Outstanding Unit Award with three oak leaf clusters, the Armed Forces Reserve Medal with hourglass device, the National Defense Service Medal, the Small Arms Marksmanship Ribbon with service star, and the Air Force Training Ribbon.
