= John E. Naus =

Jesuit priest and clown

Rev. John Erwin Naus, S.J.
- Born: John Erwin Naus; August 28, 1924; Milwaukee, Wisconsin
- Died: September 22, 2013 (aged 89); Milwaukee, Wisconsin
- Occupations: Jesuit priest and former clown

Rev. John Erwin Naus, S.J. (also known as Father Naus and Tumbleweed the Clown) (August 28, 1924 – September 22, 2013) was a Jesuit priest and former clown who served for nearly 50 years at Marquette University.

== Life and education ==
Naus attended Holy Cross Grade School and Marquette University High School in Milwaukee, Wisconsin. When he was young, he wanted to run away with the circus. He entered the Society of Jesus at St. Stanislaus Seminary in Florissant, Missouri on August 8, 1942. In 1944, he contracted polio.

Naus held degrees from Saint Louis University and the Pontifical Gregorian University in Rome. He was ordained a Jesuit priest on June 16, 1955, at the Gesu Church on the Marquette University campus.

In 1971, Naus rode in the Great Circus Parade.

== Career ==
Naus started at Marquette as dean of students in 1963. Over his years at the university, he served in a variety of roles, including director of spiritual welfare, residence hall minister, associate professor of philosophy, faculty adviser to Alpha Sigma Nu and the Evans Scholars, assistant to the president, and chaplain to the Alumni Memorial Union. For 28 years, he was known for preaching Tuesday night Mass at the St. Joan of Arc Chapel, where many students were regulars, regardless of temperature. He retired from Marquette in 2012, but continued to spend time at the university.

== Honors and tributes ==
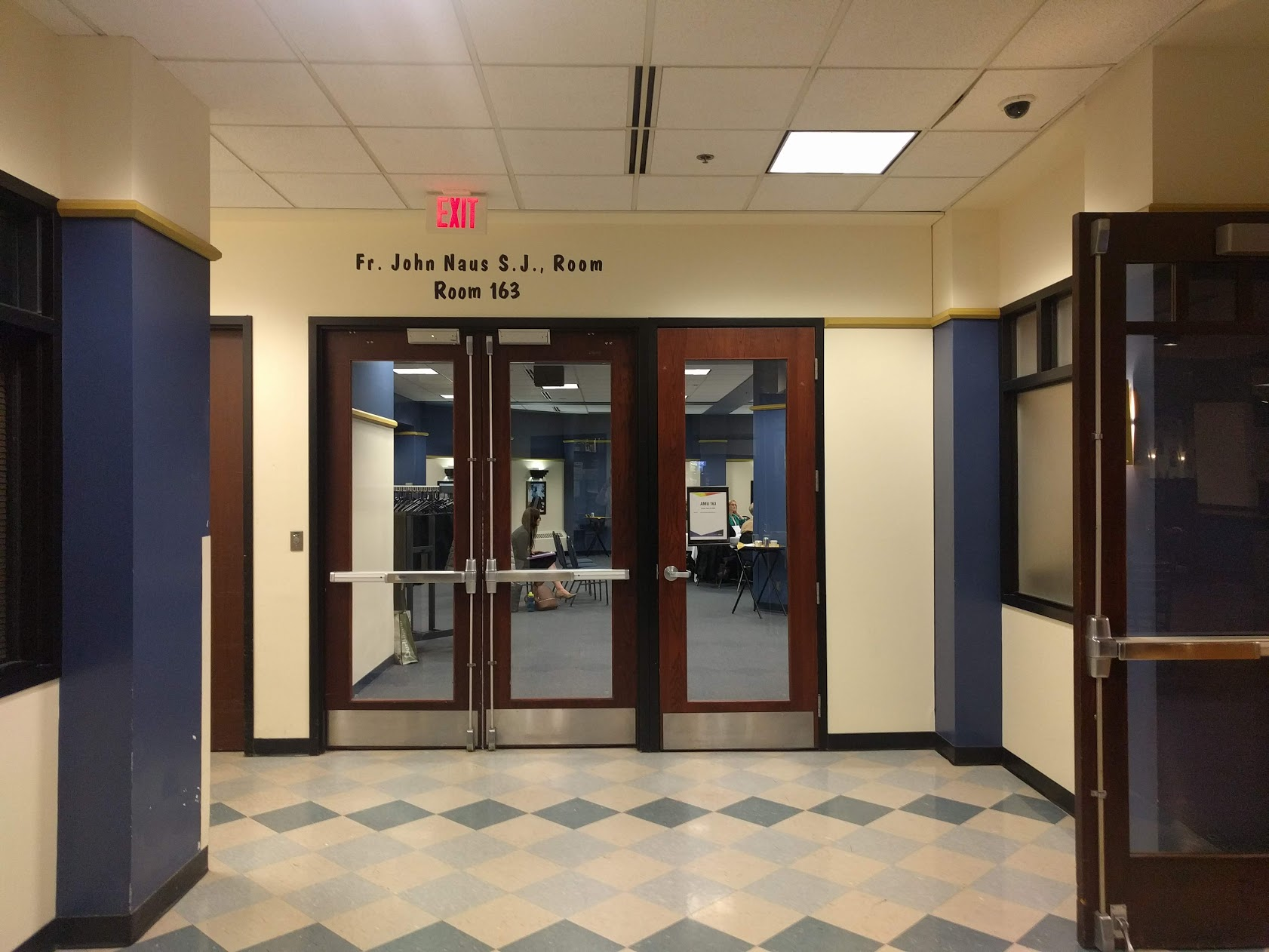
Fr. John Naus S.J., Room in the Alumni Memorial Union at Marquette University

Marquette University has a meeting room dedicated to Naus, including memorabilia and photographs from his time at the university. The room was officially dedicated to Naus on August 29, 2016. The Rev. John E. Naus, S.J., Scholarship Fund was started by Naus to help fund the education of students with financial need.
