= Virginia Hart =

American politician

Virginia B. Hart (July 19, 1914 – March 24, 2007) was an American politician and the first female cabinet member in Wisconsin.

After World War II, Hart came to Wisconsin with her husband. Hart joined a small group to reorganize the Democratic Party of Wisconsin and became its first executive secretary. Hart was an instructor at the Wisconsin School for Workers during the late 1940s and a member of the Madison Citizens for Fair Housing from 1950 to 1964. She was also a founder of Group Health Cooperative of South Central Wisconsin. In the late 1960s, Hart was the president of the Community Welfare Council.

Hart was a formative force in bringing together social agencies of the city of Madison, Wisconsin and community service in the State of Wisconsin. In 1973, Hart was appointed as Wisconsin's Secretary of the Department of Regulations and Licensing by Governor Patrick J. Lucey. Hart also served as Commissioner of Labor, Industry and Human Relations, vice chair of the Wisconsin Judicial Commission, chair of the Labor and Industry Review Commission, and as chair of the Wisconsin Manpower Council. Hart served on the Police and Fire Commission in the City of Madison.

After her death in 2007, Lieutenant Governor of Wisconsin Barbara Lawton spoke at her memorial service.

The Governor of Wisconsin's Virginia Hart Special Recognition Award is named in her honor. Organized annually by the State Employment Relations Commission, the award recognizes Wisconsin's exceptional women whose contributions to the state have a significant impact.
