= James Santelle =

American lawyer

James L. Santelle

United States Attorney for the Eastern District of Wisconsin
- In office 2010–2015
- President: Barack Obama
- Preceded by: Steven M. Biskupic
- Succeeded by: Gregory Haanstad (acting); Matthew Krueger

Personal details
- Born: 1958 (age 67–68) Milwaukee, Wisconsin, U.S.
- Education: Marquette University; University of Chicago Law School

James L. Santelle (born 1958) is an American attorney and former prosecutor who served as United States attorney for the Eastern District of Wisconsin from 2010 to 2015.

== Life and career ==
Born in Milwaukee, Wisconsin, Santelle graduated from Marquette University in 1980 and the University of Chicago Law School in 1983. From 1983 to 1985, he was a law clerk to Judge Robert W. Warren of the United States District Court for the Eastern District of Wisconsin. From 1985 until 2010, Santelle was employed as a federal prosecutor, holding various posts in the Eastern District of Wisconsin: he supervised the civil division from 1993 to 1999, acted as interim United States Attorney from 2001 to 2002, and served as executive assistant United States Attorney from 2002 to 2003. Between 1999 and 2001, Santelle was an administrator at the Executive Office for United States Attorneys. During the Iraq War, Santelle served as rule of law coordinator and as legal advisor at the United States Embassy in Baghdad.

In December 2009, President Barack Obama nominated Santelle to the office of United States Attorney for the Eastern District of Wisconsin. Santelle was confirmed by the United States Senate on December 24, 2009; he was formally inaugurated in August 2010. As United States Attorney, Santelle gained public attention for his personal response to the 2012 Wisconsin gurdwara shooting. Santelle retired from the Justice Department on July 31, 2015, and was succeeded by First Assistant United States Attorney Gregory Haanstad. As of 2025, Santelle hosts a weekly radio show; Amicus: A Law Review on the Wisconsin radio network Civic Media
