= Scott Blader =

American lawyer (born 1974)

Scott C. Blader
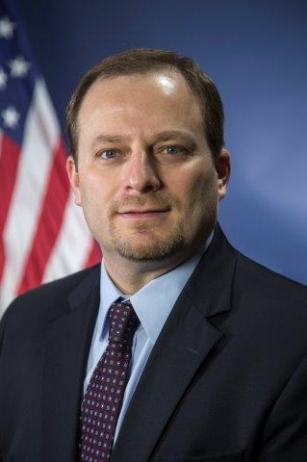

United States Attorney for the Western District of Wisconsin
- In office November 22, 2017 – February 26, 2021
- President: Donald Trump; Joe Biden
- Preceded by: John W. Vaudreuil
- Succeeded by: Timothy M. O'Shea (acting)

Personal details
- Born: 1974 (age 51–52) Wild Rose, Wisconsin, U.S.
- Education: University of Wisconsin-Oshkosh (BA); Marquette University (JD)

Scott C. Blader (born 1974) is an American attorney who served as the United States Attorney for the Western District of Wisconsin until February 26, 2021. Prior to his service as a United States Attorney, Blader served as the District Attorney of Waushara County from 2007 to 2017. Blader was named State of Wisconsin Prosecutor of the Year in 2015 and Wisconsin Association of Homicide Detectives Prosecutor of the Year in 2014. He was previously an associate attorney with Blader Law Office, where he focused on criminal litigation.

== U.S. Attorney ==
Blader was confirmed by the United States Senate on November 9, 2017, and sworn into office on November 22, 2017.

As U.S. Attorney for the Western District of Wisconsin, Blader oversees a staff of 22 lawyers and 31 support staff in the office, which prosecutes federal crimes in a 44-county area. In his role as U.S. Attorney, Blader is overseeing an investigation into Wisconsin's juvenile prison system. The investigation was started by Wisconsin Attorney General Brad Schimel in 2015 before being handed off to the Federal Bureau of Investigation in 2016. The investigation is looking into possible child neglect, prisoner abuse, and other potential crimes at the state's juvenile detention facilities. On February 8, 2021, he, along with 55 other Trump-era attorneys, was asked to resign. Blader announced his resignation on February 11, effective February 26.
