= Beating of Frank Jude Jr. =

2004 police brutality incident in Milwaukee, Wisconsin

- Location: Milwaukee, Wisconsin, U.S.
- Date: October 24, 2004; 22 years ago
- Attack type: Police brutality, beating, torture, cutting
- Weapon: Various
- Victims: Frank Jude Jr. and Lovell Harris
- Perpetrator: Mob of off-duty Milwaukee police officers
- Motive: Control, racism
- Accused: Ryan Packard (acquitted)
- Charges: State: Bartlett, Masarik: Second-degree recklessly endangering safety Bartlett, Masarik, Spengler: Substantial battery Federal: Masarik, Spengler, Bartlett, Lemke, Packard, Schabel: Deprivation of rights under color of law Masarik, Spengler, Bartlett, Lemke, Packard, Clausing: Conspiracy to deprive rights (charge dropped for Lemke); Schabel, Stromei: Witness tampering
- Verdict: State: Spengler, Masarik: Not guilty on all counts Bartlett: Not guilty of reckless endangerment, hung jury on substantial battery Federal: Bartlett, Masarik, Spengler: Guilty on all counts Packard: Not guilty on both counts Schabel, Clausing, Stromei: Pleaded guilty
- Sentence: Bartlett: 17 1/3 years in prison Masarik and Spengler: 15 2/3 years in prison Schabel: 2 2/3 years in prison Clausing: 2 1/3 years in prison Stromei: 2 years in prison Lemke: 1 year in prison
- Convicted: Daniel Masarik; Andrew Spengler; Jon Bartlett; Ryan Lemke; Joseph Schabel; Jon Clausing; Joseph Stromei

Frank Jude Jr., a.k.a. Frankie Lee Jude Jr., (born August 14, 1978) is a Wisconsin man who was severely beaten and tortured by off-duty Milwaukee police officers in the early-morning hours of October 24, 2004. The police had erroneously accused him of stealing a police badge, and screamed racial slurs at him during the attack. They also had beaten Jude's friend, Lovell Harris, but Harris was able to escape the attack.

Following a state trial that ended with the jury acquitting the three police officers charged, a federal investigation led to plea agreements with three police officers and the indictment of five police officers, including the three who were acquitted in state court. Before trial, one of these five pleaded guilty. The federal jury acquitted one of the remaining police officers and the three police officers who were acquitted in state court were convicted in federal court, and each of the three were sentenced to over 15 years in prison.

The case was the biggest against the Milwaukee Police Department in 25 years.

== The events of October 24, 2004 ==
On the evening of October 23, 2004, Frank Jude and his friend, Lovell Harris, who is black, were invited by Kirsten Antonissen and Katie Brown to a housewarming party being hosted by police officer Andrew Spengler at his Bay View, Milwaukee home. Many of the persons at the party were off-duty Milwaukee police officers.

Upon arriving at Andrew Spengler's home, Jude and Harris told Antonissen that they felt uncomfortable and therefore wanted to leave. The group quickly left and shortly after doing so, Andrew Spengler reported that his wallet, which contained his police badge, was missing. At least ten men who were at Spengler's home went outside and confronted Jude, Harris, Antonissen, and Brown. Among the off-duty officers who confronted the group were Andrew Spengler, Jon Bartlett, Daniel Masarik, Ryan Packard, Ryan Lemke, Jon Clausing, and Joseph Stromei.

The off-duty officers identified themselves as police officers and focused their attention upon Jude and Harris, demanding to know where the badge was. Both men denied taking the badge. When Jude and the others stayed inside Antonissen's truck, the mob threatened them, saying "Nigger, we can kill you."

During this confrontation, Ryan Packard took Jude to the ground, where other off-duty officers held him down and searched him for the badge. The off-duty officers demanded that Jude tell them where the badge was and while doing so repeatedly punched and kicked him. Another officer, Jon Clausing, cut Harris's face with a knife; Harris freed himself and ran away.

Kirsten Antonissen called 9-1-1 and reported that people who were claiming to be police officers were beating up her friend. While talking to the 9-1-1 dispatcher, Antonissen reported that a uniformed officer had responded to the scene and that he too began beating Frank Jude. This on-duty officer, Joseph Schabel, arrived at the scene and upon learning that Jude was suspected of stealing a police badge, repeatedly stomped on the suspect's head until others could hear bones breaking, while his partner, Nicole Martinez, watched. Other officers grabbed the phone from Antonissen and threw her against the truck, denting it. Brown also made two phone calls to 9-1-1 before her phone was seized.

Apologizing to Martinez, Masarik lifted Jude off the ground and kicked him in the crotch. Then Bartlett took Schabel's pen and shoved it into both of Jude's ear canals, causing Jude to scream and squirm in extreme pain and resulting in significant injury. The mob broke two of Jude's fingers by bending them back until they snapped. Spengler put a gun to Jude's head and threatened to kill him. Additionally, during this incident, Bartlett used a knife to cut off Jude's leather jacket and pants, leaving him naked in the street.

Frank Jude was initially arrested on suspicion of theft and quickly loaded into a police van and transported to the hospital for treatment of his numerous injuries. The admitting physician took photographs because there were so many injuries to document. The injury to Jude's ears was so severe that emergency room physicians could not diagnose it immediately because they could not control the bleeding.

No one was ever charged with the theft of the badge and the badge was never found.

== The investigation ==
The investigation that followed was met with a code of silence on the part of the police officers involved. An internal police investigation resulted in the termination of nine officers, suspension of three, and the demotion of one. The district attorney's office faced mounting criticism at the pace of the investigation, led in large part by Alderman Michael McGee Jr., who, at a rally calling for criminal charges, referred to the suspected officers as "hate mongers and KKK killers," and said, "Any man that would pull another man's pants down is a straight-up sick faggot."

Following a secret John Doe proceeding, on February 28, 2005, District Attorney E. Michael McCann filed felony charges against Daniel Masarik, Andrew Spengler, and Jon Bartlett. Bartlett and Masarik both faced charges of second-degree recklessly endangering safety and substantial battery. Spengler was charged only with substantial battery. Masarik also faced an additional charge of perjury for testifying during the John Doe hearing that he never had any contact with Frank Jude. This perjury charge was handled separately from all others and eventually dropped.

== The state trial ==
On March 27, 2006, a joint jury trial commenced before Judge David Hansher, which was covered by Court TV. The prosecutors took the unusual step of challenging the racial composition of the jury when an all-white jury was selected. The court rejected the prosecutors' challenge and permitted the case to proceed with an all-white jury, laying the groundwork for much community outrage. The prosecution's task was made particularly difficult by the fact that nearly all of the eyewitnesses to the crime admitted drinking that evening, some heavily. Further, it was later revealed that one of the state's key witnesses, Joseph Schabel, the first on-duty Milwaukee Police Officer to arrive at the scene, lied in his testimony. Also, the state was presented with credibility problems with respect to its two victims. Frank Jude had previously been convicted of the felonies of selling marijuana and bribing a police officer in 1996 and was convicted of the misdemeanors of battery and disorderly conduct in 2000. Lovell Harris was previously convicted of being a felon in possession of a firearm and with first degree intentional homicide.

Shortly after 11 PM on April 14, 2006, after deliberating for roughly 27 hours, the jury returned its verdict, acquitting Andrew Spengler and Daniel Masarik. Jon Bartlett was acquitted of second-degree recklessly endangering safety but the jury deadlocked on the charge of substantial battery. It was the only felony jury trial that D.A. McCann ever lost in his 38 years as a prosecutor.

== Community outrage ==
The acquittal drew prompt community outrage. Despite the late hour, a small group of protesters, led by Alderman Michael McGee Jr., marched through the streets surrounding the county courthouse. There were prompt calls for federal charges. On April 18, 2006, a crowd of 3,000 to 5,000 people marched from the Milwaukee County Courthouse to the Federal Courthouse demanding a federal investigation. On May 15, 2006, a motorcade of more than 300 cars delivered a petition to United States Attorney Steven Biskupic demanding a federal investigation. In response to these demonstrations Biskupic promised a full investigation.

== The federal trial ==
On October 19, 2006, the grand jury returned a two count indictment charging Jon Bartlett, Andrew Spengler, Daniel Masarik, Ryan Lemke, and Ryan Packard each with violating the civil rights of Frank Jude and Lovell Harris under color of state law and assaulting Frank Jude while acting as police officers. Three other officers, Joseph Stromei, Jon Clausing, and Joseph Schabel agreed to plead guilty to crimes related to Jude's beating.

On July 5, 2007, Ryan Lemke agreed to plead guilty to a lesser crime and on July 9, 2007, the jury trial commenced against the four other officers. Unlike the state trial, the federal trial included one black man on the jury. Additionally, Charles N. Clevert Jr., the only black judge serving on the United States District Court for the Eastern District of Wisconsin, presided over the trial. However, the most notable change came in testimony from Joseph Schabel, the first on-duty officer to arrive at the scene, who testified in state court that he never kicked Frank Jude but did observe others do so. In federal court, after pleading guilty pursuant to a plea agreement that included a grant of immunity from perjury charges for his state testimony, Joseph Schabel testified that he "stomped" on Frank Jude's head two or three times.

After nearly three weeks of testimony and roughly 30 hours of deliberation, shortly after 2 PM on July 26, 2007, the jury of eight women and four men returned its verdicts finding Jon Bartlett, Daniel Masarik, and Andrew Spengler guilty of both counts. The jury acquitted Ryan Packard of both counts; Packard's defense was that he acted as a reasonable police officer when he took Frank Jude to the ground and left the scene in search of Lovell Harris before other officers began to beat Jude.

The jury rejected Daniel Masarik's defense, which was that eyewitnesses were confusing him with Ryan Lemke, another off-duty officer at the party who pleaded guilty pursuant to a plea agreement shortly before the federal trial began. At the time, both defendants had roughly the same builds, same hair color, and hair styles. Further supporting Daniel Masarik's defense of mistaken identification is the fact that some witnesses did not identify Daniel Masarik as a person involved in the beating of Frank Jude until after the photographs of Daniel Masarik, Andrew Spengler, Jon Bartlett, and Ryan Packard were widely publicized in the media. At that time, Ryan Lemke's photograph was not publicized.

Daniel Masarik and Andrew Spengler, both of whom had been free on bond, were promptly taken into custody to await sentencing.

Jon Bartlett was already in state custody, having been convicted and sentenced to 4 ½ years in prison for making a bomb threat to his former police station during a night of drinking on December 1, 2005, while he was suspended from the police force during the investigation into this matter. Also while this matter was pending, Jon Bartlett was charged in federal court with falsely stating that he was not currently facing felony charges in an effort to obtain a submachine gun, a handgun, and hundreds of rounds of ammunition.

On March 30, 2007, Bartlett pleaded guilty to this charge and on August 3, 2007, Chief Judge Rudolph T. Randa sentenced Jon Bartlett to 18 months in prison, to be followed by 3 years of supervised release.

== Sentencing ==
On November 29, 2007, Jon Bartlett, Daniel Masarik, and Andrew Spengler were sentenced by Judge Clevert.

- Jon Bartlett was sentenced to a total of 208 months in federal prison to be served consecutively to his other sentences. In a letter read by his attorney, Frank Jude called Bartlett a "disgrace" and a "terrorist," and referred to him as "Mr. Punisher," a reference to Bartlett's tattoo of the logo for the vigilante comic book character The Punisher. Bartlett read a prepared statement wherein he apologized to Frank Jude and Lovell Harris and asked for forgiveness. He discussed how incarceration had changed him, allowing him to recognize his prior problems and bringing him closer to his family and God.
- Daniel Masarik was sentenced to 188 months in prison for his actions, the precise sentence the government argued for. Although he had no criminal record Judge Clevert felt this sentence, which was the top of the range suggested by the sentencing guidelines, was warranted because of what he regarded as Masarik's repeated untruthful testimony that he never approached Jude during the incident, in addition to the factors regarding the impact that this crime had upon the community. In a brief prepared statement, Masarik apologized to Frank Jude and Lovell Harris for what happened to them but did not admit his involvement in the crime.
- Andrew Spengler received the same sentence as Masarik, 188 months in prison. Spengler, like Masarik, apologized to Frank Jude but did not admit involvement in the assault. Spengler was the most emotional of the three defendants, repeatedly having to stop while speaking in court to blot his eyes and choke back tears. Spengler had previously notably broken down in tears during his attorney's closing argument during the state court trial.

Each defendant will also be required to complete three years of supervised release following his release from prison and pay, along with the other police officers convicted in this case, more than sixteen-thousand dollars in restitution for Frank Jude's medical bills. Bartlett, Masarik, and Spengler all indicated they would appeal.

=== Related sentencing ===
- On November 3, 2006, Joseph Schabel pleaded guilty to assaulting Frank Jude under color of state law, thereby violating Frank Jude's right to be free from unreasonable seizure, in violation of 18 U.S.C. § 242, and obstructing the federal investigation by lying about his actions, in violation of 18 U.S.C. § 1512(b)(3). In his plea agreement, Joseph Schabel admitted he kicked Frank Jude in the head and that he witnessed off-duty officers continue to assault Frank Jude even after Frank Jude was handcuffed. On December 6, 2007, Joseph Schabel was sentenced to 32 months in prison.
- Jon Clausing was an off-duty police officer at Andrew Spengler's housewarming party. According to his plea agreement, Jon Clausing admitted that he and another off-duty officer threatened Lovell Harris at knifepoint. After Harris fled, Jon Clausing returned to the group around Frank Jude and witnessed the assault of Frank Jude. On November 3, 2006, Jon Clausing pleaded guilty to conspiring to violate the civil rights of Frank Jude and Lovell Harris, in violation of 18 U.S.C. § 241. On December 6, 2007, Jon Clausing was sentenced to 28 months in prison.
- On December 7, 2006, Joseph Stromei, an off-duty police officer who was a guest at Andrew Spengler's housewarming party, pleaded guilty to obstructing the federal investigation by lying about his knowledge regarding the beating of Frank Jude, in violation of 18 U.S.C. § 1512(b)(3). According to his plea agreement, Joseph Stromei previously stated that he never saw anyone assault Frank Jude or brandish a knife during the incident when, in fact, he did see such things. On September 11, 2007, Judge Clevert sentenced Stromei to 24 months in prison to be followed by 3 years of supervised release. Stromei was allowed to remain free following sentencing in order to finish college classes and to begin serving his prison sentence at the end of the semester.
- On July 6, 2007, Ryan Lemke pleaded guilty to assaulting Frank Jude under color of state law, in violation of 18 U.S.C. §§ 2 and 242. According to his plea agreement, Ryan Lemke participated in helping hold down Frank Jude's legs and as on-duty police officers began to arrive, continued to attempt to restrain Frank Jude by delivering two kicks to Frank Jude's thigh. On November 2, 2007, Ryan Lemke was sentenced to one year in prison, the maximum he could have received. Lemke must also serve one year of supervised release, perform 100 hours of community service, and pay a $3,000 fine. Lemke was allowed to remain free on bail and to report to prison upon the completion of his current semester in college.

Lemke was released from prison on January 21, 2009. Stromei was released from prison on July 31, 2009. Clausing was released from prison on January 22, 2010. Schabel was released from prison on May 18, 2010.

=== Appellate review of sentencing ===
The United States Court of Appeals for the 7th Circuit reviewed the sentences of Bartlett, Spengler and Masarik. Argument was held before a three judge panel consisting of Chief Judge Easterbrook and Circuit Judges Bauer and Rovner on May 15, 2009, and the court issued its ruling June 8, 2009. The court affirmed all three convictions and the sentences given to Spengler, Masarik, and Bartlett.

Bartlett was released from prison on February 2, 2022. Masarik and Spengler were both released from prison on November 27, 2020.

== The civil lawsuit ==
The two women who accompanied Frank Jude to Andrew Spengler's party on October 24, 2004, have filed federal civil rights lawsuits against all of the police officers who were charged in federal court, except for Joseph Stromei, as well as Jon Bartlett's wife, a former Milwaukee police officer, and the City of Milwaukee. This lawsuit is currently pending before judge Lynn Adelman.
