= James B. Brennan =

American attorney and politician (1926–2021)

City Attorney of Milwaukee, Wisconsin
- In office April 1972 – April 1984
- Preceded by: John J. Fleming
- Succeeded by: Grant Langley

United States Attorney for the Eastern District of Wisconsin
- In office May 8, 1961 – 1969
- President: John F. Kennedy; Lyndon B. Johnson
- Preceded by: Edward G. Minor
- Succeeded by: David J. Cannon

Member of the Wisconsin Senate from the 5th district
- In office January 5, 1959 – April 29, 1961
- Preceded by: Walter L. Merten
- Succeeded by: Charles J. Schmidt

Personal details
- Born: James Butler Brennan; February 1, 1926 Milwaukee, Wisconsin
- Died: June 6, 2021 (aged 95)
- Resting place: Milwaukee, Wisconsin
- Party: Democratic
- Spouse: Joan Landgraf Brennan
- Children: William Brennan, Mary Jo Brennan, Nancy Brennan, Marty Brennan
- Education: University of Notre Dame (A.B.); Marquette Law School (LL.B.)
- Profession: attorney

Military service
- Allegiance: United States
- Branch/service: United States Navy
- Years of service: 1944–1946
- Battles/wars: World War II

James Butler Brennan (February 1, 1926 – June 6, 2021) was an American attorney and Democratic politician from the U.S. state of Wisconsin. He was United States Attorney for the Eastern District of Wisconsin during the presidencies of John F. Kennedy and Lyndon B. Johnson and later served twelve years as Milwaukee's city attorney. Earlier in his career, he served two and a half years in the Wisconsin State Senate.

== Life and career ==
Born in Milwaukee, Wisconsin, Brennan graduated from Milwaukee's Marquette University High School and joined the United States Navy at age 18, for service in World War II. He received his bachelor's degree from the University of Notre Dame and his LL.B. from Marquette University Law School. He practiced law in Milwaukee for several years before running for office. He was a delegate to the 1960 Democratic National Convention, supporting the presidential nomination of then-Senator John F. Kennedy.

Brennan was elected to the Wisconsin State Senate in 1958, representing part of the city of Milwaukee. He served two years but resigned in April 1961 in anticipation of his confirmation as United States Attorney.

In March 1961, newly elected president John F. Kennedy nominated Brennan to serve as United States Attorney for the Eastern District of Wisconsin. His nomination was reported favorably out of the Senate Judiciary Committee on May 4, 1961, and he was confirmed on May 8. Brennan ultimately served through the Kennedy administration, and continued to serve through the presidency of Lyndon B. Johnson. He remained in office until his successor was appointed by President Nixon in 1969.

In 1972, Brennan was elected City Attorney for Milwaukee, serving three four-year terms. He was defeated in the 1984 election by his subordinate, Grant Langley, despite strong backing from the then-Mayor Henry Maier. After his defeat, he worked briefly as a staff attorney for the Milwaukee Metropolitan Sewerage District before resigning from that role in 1988.

Brennan died on June 6, 2021. He is survived by his four children, six grandchildren, and seven great-grandchildren.
