= John W. Vaudreuil =

American lawyer, former U.S. Attorney for the Western District of Wisconsin

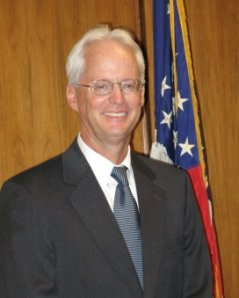

United States Attorney for the Western District of Wisconsin
- In office August 10, 2010 – March 13, 2017
- President: Barack Obama; Donald Trump
- Preceded by: Erik C. Peterson
- Succeeded by: Scott Blader

Personal details
- Born: John William Vaudreuil; August 2, 1954 (age 72) Rice Lake, Wisconsin
- Education: University of Wisconsin–Madison (BA, JD)

John William Vaudreuil (born August 2, 1954) is an American lawyer. He was United States Attorney for the Western District of Wisconsin during the presidency of Barack Obama.

== Career ==
Vaudreuil graduated from the University of Wisconsin–Madison in 1976 and the University of Wisconsin Law School in 1979.

Vaudreuil was an Assistant United States Attorney in the district since January 1980 representing the United States in criminal cases in federal court. Vaudreuil has handled thousands of criminal cases including fraud, public corruption, environmental crimes, murder, tax crimes, bank robberies, and drug crimes. In 1992, he was designated as a Senior Litigation Counsel by the Department of Justice, and in June 2002 he was named the Chief for the Criminal Division for the United States Attorney's Office. He served in that position until his appointment as United States Attorney in 2010.

From 1987 to 2002, he taught Evidence and Trial Advocacy to law students at the University of Wisconsin Law School. Since 1992, he has taught thousands of U.S. prosecutors regarding evidence, trial advocacy, and criminal procedure. Since 2001 he has supported the rule of law efforts of the U.S. Department of Justice, teaching prosecutors, defense attorneys, and judges in many foreign countries.

=== U.S. Attorney ===
Vaudreuil was nominated as U.S. Attorney by President Barack Obama on June 1, 2010. He was subsequently confirmed by the U.S. Senate, and took office on August 10, 2010.

On March 11, 2017, Vaudreuil announced his resignation as U.S. Attorney, effective March 13, after being asked to by Jeff Sessions, the United States Attorney General under President Donald Trump.

== See also ==
- 2017 dismissal of U.S. attorneys
