= Steven M. Biskupic =

American lawyer

United States Attorney for the Eastern District of Wisconsin
- In office May 9, 2002 – January 9, 2009
- President: George W. Bush
- Preceded by: Thomas Paul Schneider
- Succeeded by: Michelle Jacobs (interim); James Santelle (confirmed)

Personal details
- Born: March 26, 1961 (age 64)
- Education: Marquette University (BA, JD)
- Profession: Lawyer

Steven M. Biskupic (born March 26, 1961) is an American attorney who served as U.S. Attorney for the Eastern District of Wisconsin from 2002 to 2009 under Attorneys General John Ashcroft, Alberto Gonzales and Michael Mukasey. He was appointed by George W. Bush in May 2002. Prior to his appointment, Biskupic served as an Assistant U.S. Attorney for 13 years, specializing in the prosecution of white-collar crime.

In 2007, Biskupic and his office came under review by US Congressional and Senate investigators looking at the 2006 Dismissal of U.S. Attorneys controversy. In 2010, the U.S. Department of Justice's internal affairs unit cleared Biskupic of any ethical wrongdoing in the Georgia Thompson prosecution.

== Early life and education ==
Biskupic is one of nine siblings born to a Catholic family of Croatian and Irish descent. His brother, Vince Biskupic, formerly district attorney of Outagamie County, Wisconsin, was the Republican candidate for Attorney General of Wisconsin in 2002. Vince was named in 2014 by Governor Scott Walker to a judgeship on the Outagamie Circuit Court. Their sister, Joan, is a federal legal affairs reporter with Washington Week on PBS and USA Today.

Biskupic received his B.A. in Journalism from Marquette University in 1983 and his J.D. from Marquette in 1987.

== Career ==
Biskupic began serving in March 1989 as a criminal prosecutor in the United States Department of Justice. Prior to joining the United States Attorney's Office, he served for two years as a judicial law clerk to the late Robert W. Warren, United States District Judge for the Eastern District of Wisconsin.

Biskupic later worked on a series of high-profile public corruption and civil rights cases in Milwaukee, including the conviction of nine police officers, four Milwaukee aldermen, a state senator and several other public officials. Among Steven Biskupic's highest-profile prosecutions was against the Milwaukee police officers who beat Frank Jude Jr.

Biskupic is an adjunct professor of law at Marquette University Law School.

=== Georgia Thompson prosecution ===
In January 2006, under Biskupic's direction, Georgia Thompson, a Wisconsin state procurement supervisor was prosecuted for corruption charges related to a state travel contract. She was convicted and sentenced to eighteen months. This conviction was thrown out by an appellate court panel in Chicago after 20 minutes of oral argument.

==== Update on appeals written opinion ====
In an April 20, 2007 article TPM muckraker reporter Paul Kiel noted:

"the federal appeals court released its written opinion on the case. And it wasn't any more sparing than the verbal remarks (e.g. that the evidence was "beyond thin") of the judges when they made the ruling. The prosecution was based on a reading of the law by which "simple violations of administrative rules [by bureaucrats] would become crimes", the judges wrote. By that interpretation, "it is a federal crime for any official in state or local government to take account of political considerations when deciding how to spend public money" — a "preposterous" idea, they wrote."

Kiel noted the House Judiciary Committee invited Biskupic to tell his story to Congress.

Gregory Stanford from the Milwaukee Journal Sentinel frames the concern about the unknowns surrounding this case and its importance for all citizens in this way:

==== Relationship to dismissal of U.S. Attorneys ====
Interest in the Milwaukee U.S. Attorney's Office and Biskupic specifically centers on how he managed to survive being on the original list of U.S. Attorneys in the dismissal controversy.

Talking Points Memo was one of the first media outlets to identify the controversy and report extensively on it. The April 11, 2007 edition of TPM Muckraker provides a detailed account of the pressure Biskupic and his office were under from both the White House and Justice Department. The Milwaukee Journal Sentinel quotes a statement delivered by Biskupic on April 14, 2007, in which he said a Bush administration list calling for his firing had no credibility.

U.S. Representative Tammy Baldwin (D-WI), now a United States senator, called for an investigation in conjunction with this controversy.

In a Washington Post article (May 11, 2007), reporters Dan Eggen and Paul Kane provide updated information on White House and Justice Department staff involvement in pressing complaints about Biskupic and a response from him.

===== House Judiciary Committee interest in Thompson case =====
The House Judiciary Committee and its chairman, John Conyers, were interested in the evolution of the Thompson case Paul Keil of Talking Points Memo reported on September 5, 2007.

==== Prosecution cleared by U.S. Department of Justice ====
In 2010, the U.S. Department of Justice's internal affairs unit cleared Biskupic "of any ethical wrongs in the Georgia Thompson prosecution" after two years of review.

=== Post-judgeship ===
At the end of the Bush Administration, Biskupic resigned and joined the Milwaukee law firm of Michael Best & Friedrich as a litigator. In 2013, Biskupic left Michael Best & Friedrich to form his own firm, Biskupic & Jacobs.

== Honors ==
In 2000, Biskupic received the Department of Justice Award for superior performance for his prosecution of mortgage fraud cases.

Legal offices
Preceded by Thomas Paul Schneider	United States Attorney for the Eastern District of Wisconsin; May 9, 2002 – January 9, 2009	Succeeded by Michelle Jacobs (interim); James Santelle (confirmed)
