= Marquette University High School =

- For Faith, Scholarship and Community

Location
- 3401 West Wisconsin Avenue; Milwaukee, Wisconsin 53208-3842; United States; 43°2′18″N 87°57′22″W

Information
- Type: Private
- Motto: Ad majorem Dei gloriam (For the greater glory of God)
- Religious affiliations: Catholic, Jesuit
- Patron saints: The Three Holy Companions: St. Ignatius of Loyola; St. Francis Xavier; St. Peter Faber
- Established: 1857
- Oversight: Wisconsin Jesuit Province
- School code: 501370
- President: Daniel J. Kennedy
- Principal: Jeff Monday
- Chaplain: Janice Kofler
- Faculty: 79
- Grades: 9–12
- Gender: Male
- Enrollment: 928 (2024-2025)
- Average class size: 232
- Student to teacher ratio: 11:1
- Hours in school day: 8
- Campus type: Urban
- Colors: Navy blue and Gold
- Fight song: We Are Marquette
- Athletics conference: WIAA Greater Metro Conference
- Mascot: Hilltopper
- Nickname: Topper
- Team name: Hilltoppers
- Accreditation: North Central Association of Colleges and Schools
- Newspaper: Flambeau
- Yearbook: Flambeau
- Website: www.muhs.edu

Marquette University High School (MUHS) is a private, all-male, Jesuit school located in Milwaukee, Wisconsin.

It is accredited by the North Central Association Commission on Accreditation and School Improvement, an accreditation division of Cognia. It is also a member of both the National Catholic Educational Association and the Jesuit Schools Network.

== History ==
Founded as St. Aloysius Academy in 1857 on 2nd and Michigan St, the institution was renamed to St. Gall's Academy and moved location in 1864. The institution became Marquette College in 1881 when a new school was opened on 10th and State St, on the top of a hill. The hilltop location gave rise to the nickname and mascot: the Hilltoppers.

In 1907 Marquette College became Marquette University and formally separated Marquette College. After the separation, the high school renamed to Marquette Academy. In 1922 Marquette Academy became Marquette University High School, and the campus at its current location was completed in 1925.

== Campus ==
Marquette University High School is located at 3401 W. Wisconsin Avenue in the Merrill Park Neighborhood on Milwaukee's west side. It is a four-story building built in the early 20th century. It was designed by architects Herbst and Kuenzli in 1922. In 1961, the gym and cafeteria addition was added. The gymnasium was built on the grounds of the house of Sherburn Merrill, the man for which Marquette High's neighborhood is named after. The gym was funded by the estate. The Gordon Henke Center was completed in 1994 which included a new main entrance on W. Michigan St. In 2008, the attached Jesuit residence was demolished to make way for a 1-story administrative and fine arts addition. Another 2 stories was built on top in 2016 creating 3 stories adjacent to the original 1925 building. In addition to the new classrooms, an atrium and expansion to the Henke entrance was added.

The Hilltoppers' home field for soccer and track is Quad/Park, located a few blocks away adjacent to Merrill Park. It was donated by former MUHS graduate Harry Quadracci ('54), in 1998. The site was formerly occupied by Marquette Stadium, which opened in 1924 and was demolished in 1976.

== Athletics ==
Nicknamed the "Hilltoppers", MUHS teams compete in the Greater Metro Conference of the Wisconsin Interscholastic Athletic Association (WIAA) for most sports. Prior to 1999, MUHS competed in the now-defunct Wisconsin Independent Schools Athletic Association (WISAA). The school fields teams in baseball, basketball, cross country running, downhill skiing, football, golf, ice hockey, lacrosse, rugby union, soccer, swimming, tennis, track and field, volleyball, and wrestling.

MUHS teams have won 28 WIAA state titles in soccer, volleyball, tennis, baseball, and football, as well as the lacrosse team's 2010 and 2013 WLF state championships. In the summers of 2008, 2009, 2010, and 2011 the Hilltoppers were ranked #1 in the state for overall boys' athletics by the Milwaukee Journal Sentinel. In the program's history, the Hilltoppers have won over 130 State Championships.

=== Basketball ===
The basketball team was 84–29 in five seasons from 1997 to 2002. The team won the 1999 Greater Metro Conference and WISAA Division I State Boys Basketball Championships, when the Hilltoppers went 21–3 and defeated Dominican High School in the championship game. The basketball team also won Greater Metro conference championships in the 1997–98 and 1999–2000 seasons. In 2010, the Hilltopper basketball team made it to the WIAA Division I state semifinals, before losing to eventual champion Arrowhead. In 2016, The Hilltoppers made another run in the post season, eventually losing to Muskego in the WIAA Division I state semifinals. In 2024, The Hilltoppers defeated Arrowhead to claim the WIAA Division I state championship.

=== Cross country ===
The MUHS cross country team has won the Greater Metro Conference meet 8 of the last 9 years, and took third at both the 2007 and 2008 WIAA state meets, as well as second in 2009, 2010, 2020 and 2024.

=== Football ===
Marquette has a football team that dates back to 1907, playing in over 1,000 games. Over that time, Marquette has won 701 games, 40 conference titles and 9 state titles. Their most successful coach, Dick Basham, coached Marquette for 38 seasons and 42% of its 1,000 games. In 2009 (his last season), the Hilltoppers went 14–0 to win the WIAA Division 1 state title. In 2023, Marquette defeated Franklin in the WIAA Division I state championship. The team currently has a partnership with ESPN Milwaukee Radio for all home and away games. Marquette football is the most historically successful high school football program in the state, with more than 140 more wins than the second place team.

=== Lacrosse ===
The MUHS lacrosse team has competed in the state tournament five times since its creation in Spring 2003 and won its first state title in 2010, which completed an undefeated season in Wisconsin. The lacrosse team annually competes against other Jesuit schools from around the United States, traveling to Indianapolis every spring where Jesuit teams from across the Midwest compete. In 2013, the MUHS lacrosse team won its second state title, with another undefeated season in Wisconsin under long-time head coach Rich Pruszynski. Rich is Wisconsin's all-time most successful boys' lacrosse coach and the first WI high school coach to guide a team to 100 wins, which was also done in 2013.

=== Soccer ===
Since 1973, the soccer program has won 24 state championships and tied a national record of 10 straight state championships from 1994 to 2003. The Hilltoppers were ranked #1 in the country by the National Soccer Coaches Association of America in 1999 and in 2003. The 2011 soccer team finished the season with an undefeated record of 24–0–1 and were ranked 4th in the US by the NSCAA and 3rd by ESPN. In 1996 and 2011 the soccer coach, Bob Spielmann and Steve Lawrence, respectively, were selected as National High School Coach of the Year.

In 2012, the Hilltoppers won the state championship, defeating Kettle Moraine High School, 2–1. In 2014, the Hilltoppers once again won a state title by beating Menomonee Falls 4–1. Throughout the 2010s, they won 8 out of 10 possible state championships. The two years they did not win came in 2013 and 2019. The loss in 2019 broke a streak of 5 straight state championships. Marquette recaptured the state championship in 2020 and mounted a successful title defense in 2021.

=== Conference affiliation history ===
- Milwaukee Catholic Conference (1930-1974)
- Metro Conference (1974-1997)
- Greater Metro Conference (1997–present)

== Co-Curriculars ==
=== FIRST Robotics ===
FIRST Robotics Competition Team 1732 - Hilltopper Robotics was founded in 2006 under the leadership of John Wanninger, who was a recipient of the Woodie Flowers Award in 2008. The team is co-ed, welcoming students from Divine Savior Holy Angels High School. A total of 13 regionals have been won by the team, with regional wins in 2025, 2024, 2023, 2022, 2017, 2014, 2013, and 2010. The Chairman's Award was won 2 times, in 2012 and 2014. The team qualified for the FIRST Championship 14 times, with championship division playoffs reached several times. In 2024, A second freshmen-only team was added to the MUHS-DSHA robotics group. The team picked up the retired robot number 1220. Team 1220 has won one regional at the Phantom Lakes Regional Competition.

=== Science Olympiad ===
Started in 2015, the Science Olympiad program has won the state tournament 4 years in a row from 2021 to 2024 and placed 1st in the region 6 times in 2018, 2019, 2020, and 2022–25. At the national tournament in 2022, the team ranked 4th nationwide. In 2026, they lost the state tournament to the Madison West team by one point, but they still qualified for the national tournament where they placed 8th overall.

=== Webster Club ===
Named after the orator Daniel Webster, the Webster Club encompasses speech and debate at MUHS. The club competes in the National Speech and Debate Association's competitions at the district, state, and nation level. The club is open to all students of all skill levels.

== Notable alumni ==
- Tom Barrett, United States Ambassador to Luxembourg and former Mayor of Milwaukee
- Robert J. Beck, Associate Professor of Political Science at the University of Wisconsin–Milwaukee
- Gene Berce, former NBA player
- Charlie Berens, comedian and host of "Manitowoc Minute"
- Dick Bilda, former Green Bay Packer
- Peter Bock, former Wisconsin State Assembly
- Peter Bonerz, actor, director; The Bob Newhart Show (1972 - '76) and others
- James B. Brennan, Wisconsin State Senator and U.S. Attorney
- Terry Brennan, Notre Dame running back (1946–1949) and coach (1954–1958)
- Jeff Bridich, baseball player and executive
- John C. Brophy, a former member of the House of Representatives
- James L. Callan, Wisconsin State Senator
- David A. Clarke Jr, Sheriff of Milwaukee County, Wisconsin
- John T. Chisholm, District Attorney of Milwaukee County, Wisconsin
- John Louis Coffey, judge
- Robert G. Dela Hunt, former member of the Wisconsin State Assembly
- Scott Detrow, host of NPR news program All Things Considered
- John R. Devitt, former member of the Wisconsin State Assembly
- Mike Dhuey, co-inventor of the iPod, co-creator (with Ron Hochsprung) of the Macintosh II
- John Gurda, Milwaukee historian and author
- Thomas J. Duffey, former member of the Wisconsin State Assembly
- Joseph "Red" Dunn, former member of the Green Bay Packers and inductee in the Wisconsin Athletic Hall of Fame
- James Fenelon, former member of the Wisconsin State Assembly
- Jon Gaines II, NFL player with the Arizona Cardinals
- Gary George, former member of the Wisconsin State Senate
- Scott Klement, computer scientist
- Scott L. Klug, former U.S. Representative
- Ira Madison III, television writer and podcaster
- Rick Majerus, former head men's basketball coach at Saint Louis University, Ball State & The University of Utah
- E. Michael McCann, former District Attorney of Milwaukee County, Wisconsin
- Alfred "Allie" McGuire, Marquette U. basketball star, cover of Sports Illustrated, NBA player and son of Al McGuire
- Thomas W. Meaux, former member of the Wisconsin State Assembly
- John L. Merkt, member of the Wisconsin State Assembly
- Albert Gregory Meyer, Cardinal Archbishop of Chicago (1958–1965)
- Jake Moreland, former NFL player
- John E. Naus, dean of students and associate professor at Marquette University
- Riley Nowakowski, NFL fullback for the Pittsburgh Steelers
- Pat O'Brien, actor
- Edward J. O'Donnell, S.J., President of Marquette University (1948–1962)
- Dare Ogunbowale, NFL player with the Las Vegas Raiders
- John E. Reilly Jr., member of the Wisconsin State Assembly and judge
- Ervin J. Ryczek, member of the Wisconsin State Assembly and funeral director
- Dan Schutte, Catholic composer and author. Here I am, Lord, City of God, Sing a New Song
- John G. Schmitz, Republican congressman from California, and father of Mary Kay Letourneau.
- Harold V. Schoenecker, Wisconsin State Senator 1939–1943, Attorney
- John Sisk Jr., American football player
- Fred R. Sloan, U.S. Air National Guard Major General
- Midori Snyder, fantasy and science fiction writer, taught at MUHS
- Tom Snyder, radio and television personality
- Angelito Tenorio, Wisconsin state legislator
- Spencer Tracy, actor, nominated for Best Actor Oscar 9 times & winner twice
- James Tynion IV, comic book writer
- James Valcq, Broadway conductor & musical theater composer

== See also ==
- List of Jesuit sites
