= William J. McCauley =

American politician

Milwaukee County District Attorney
- In office January 1, 1945 – October 30, 1964
- Preceded by: James Kerwin
- Succeeded by: Hugh R. O'Connell

Personal details
- Born: February 24, 1900 Escanaba, Michigan, U.S.
- Died: October 30, 1964 (aged 64)
- Political party: Democratic

William J. McCauley (February 24, 1900 – October 30, 1964) was an American attorney and politician who served as Milwaukee County District Attorney from 1945 to his death in 1964.

== Life and career ==
McCauley was born in Escanaba, Michigan and graduated from the Marquette University Law School in 1923. He worked as a private practice attorney in Milwaukee until 1933, when he was appointed an assistant district attorney. An active Democrat, McCauley unsuccessfully sought the party's nomination for Wisconsin's 5th congressional district in 1934. In 1936, McCauley was fired by newly appointed Progressive District Attorney Herbert Steffes and reentered private practice. After Steffes's appointment to a criminal court judgeship in 1944, McCauley entered the race to succeed him, ultimately defeating Republican George Bowman, a former district attorney and Steffes's deputy.

As district attorney, McCauley gained notoriety for his success and theatrical style as a trial attorney Although he was elected to ten two-year terms, he failed in his efforts to attain judicial office; in 1955, he unsuccessfully challenged Steffes for his seat on the Milwaukee County Municipal Court.

McCauley died of lung cancer on October 30, 1964, while seeking his eleventh term in office. He was succeeded by a first assistant district attorney, Hugh R. O'Connell.
