= Matthew Krueger =

American lawyer (born 1978)

Matthew D. Krueger
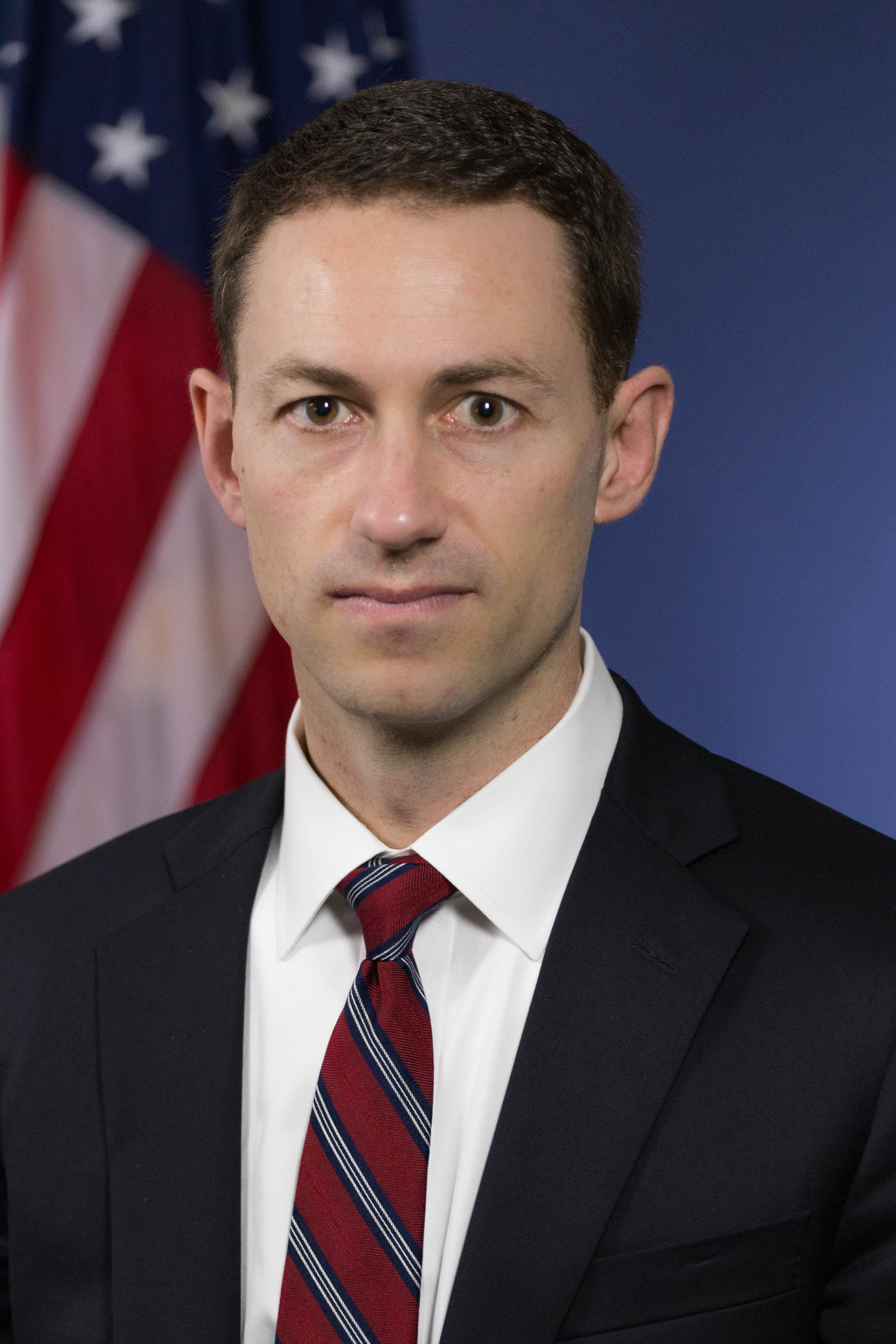

United States Attorney for the Eastern District of Wisconsin
- In office February 22, 2018 – February 20, 2021
- President: Donald Trump; Joe Biden
- Preceded by: James Santelle
- Succeeded by: Richard G. Frohling (acting)

Personal details
- Born: Matthew Dean Krueger; 1978 (age 47–48) Milwaukee, Wisconsin, U.S.
- Education: University of Wisconsin–Madison; University of Minnesota Law School

Matthew Dean Krueger (born 1978) is an American lawyer. He served as the United States Attorney for the Eastern District of Wisconsin from 2018 to 2021.

== Education ==
He graduated of the University of Wisconsin–Madison in 2000 with honors and the University of Minnesota Law School in 2006, where he served as editor-in-chief of the Minnesota Law Review. Krueger clerked for Paul V. Niemeyer of the United States Court of Appeals for the Fourth Circuit from 2006 to 2007.

== Career ==
Krueger worked as a Bristow Fellow in the United States Department of Justice, Office of the Solicitor General from 2007 to 2008. He then was an associate at Sidley Austin in Washington D.C. from 2008 to 2013, where his focus was on securities law, antitrust law, and unfair competition

In 2013, he joined Assistant United States Attorney for the Eastern District of Wisconsin, working in both the civil and criminal departments. Krueger worked at the U.S. Attorney's office from 2013 to 2018. On February 15, 2018, his nomination to be the United States Attorney was confirmed by voice vote. He was sworn in on February 22, 2018. On February 8, 2021, he along with 55 other Trump-era attorneys were asked to resign. On February 11, he announced his resignation, effective February 20, 2021. He then was hired to become a partner at the law firm of Foley and Lardner in its Milwaukee office, where his focus is on appeals, commercial law, and cybersecurity. In 2025, the Trump Administration considered nominating him to be a judge on the United States Court of Appeals for the Seventh Circuit.
