= Gregory Haanstad =

American lawyer

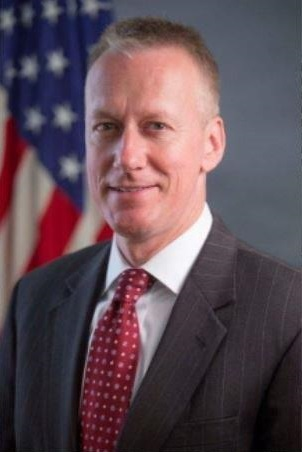

United States Attorney for the Eastern District of Wisconsin
- In office September 19, 2022 – February 17, 2025
- President: Joe Biden; Donald Trump
- Preceded by: Richard G. Frohling (acting)
- Succeeded by: Richard G. Frohling (acting)
- Acting
- In office 2016–2018
- Preceded by: James Santelle
- Succeeded by: Matthew Krueger

Personal details
- Education: University of Wisconsin, La Crosse (BS); University of Wisconsin (JD)

Gregory Haanstad is an American lawyer who served as the United States attorney for the Eastern District of Wisconsin from 2022 through 2025, after being nominated by President Joe Biden. He previously served as acting U.S. attorney in the same district from 2016 through 2018.

== Education ==
Haanstad received a Bachelor of Science from the University of Wisconsin, La Crosse in 1995 and a Juris Doctor, cum laude, from the University of Wisconsin Law School in 2000.

== Legal career ==
Haanstad served as a law clerk for magistrate judge William E. Callahan Jr. on the United States District Court for the Eastern District of Wisconsin from 2000 to 2002. Beginning in 2002, he served as an Assistant United States Attorney in the United States Attorney's Office for the Eastern District of Wisconsin. He became first assistant to U.S. attorney James Santelle in 2010.

== U.S. attorney for the Eastern District of Wisconsin ==
=== Acting U.S. attorney from 2016 to 2018 ===
He was appointed to the post on an acting basis on August 1, 2015, and served in that capacity until 2016. He was previously United States attorney for the Eastern District of Wisconsin from 2016 to 2018.

=== Nomination as U.S. attorney under Biden ===
In May 2021, his name was among five lawyers who was submitted to the White House by senators Tammy Baldwin and Ron Johnson. On June 6, 2022, President Joe Biden nominated Haanstad to be the United States attorney for the Eastern District of Wisconsin. On July 28, 2022, his nomination was reported out of the Senate Judiciary Committee by a voice vote. On September 13, 2022, his nomination was confirmed in the United States Senate by voice vote. He was sworn in on September 19, 2022.

Legal offices
Preceded by James Santelle	United States Attorney for the Eastern District of Wisconsin; 2016–2018	Succeeded by Matthew Krueger
Preceded by Richard G. Frohling (acting)	United States Attorney for the Eastern District of Wisconsin; 2022–2025	Succeeded by Richard G. Frohling (acting)
