= Milwaukee County, Wisconsin =

County in Wisconsin, United States

- County
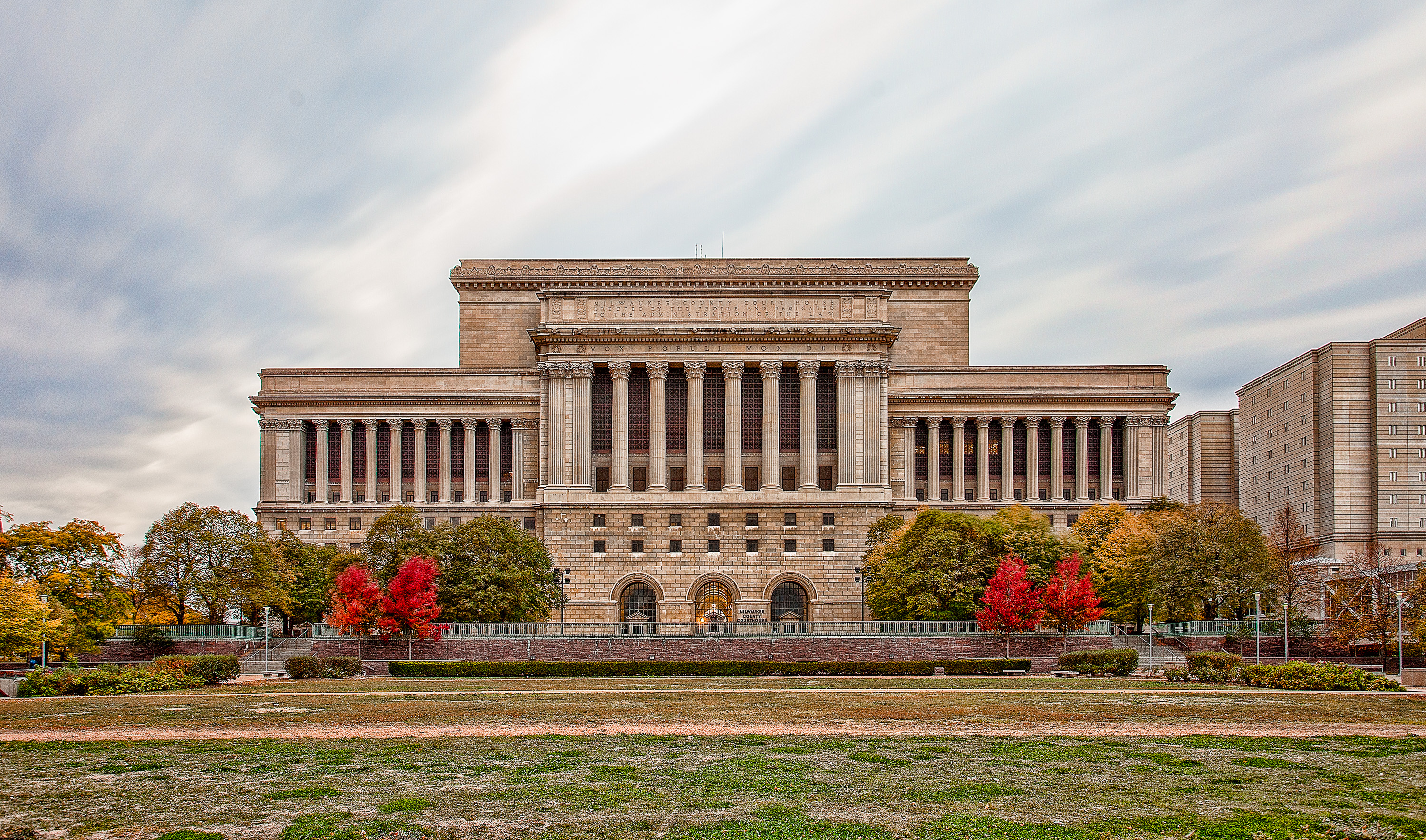
- Milwaukee County Courthouse

- Flag Seal

- Location within the U.S. state of Wisconsin
- Coordinates: 43°00′00″N 87°58′02″W
- Country: United States
- State: Wisconsin
- Founded: 1835
- Named for: Milwaukee River
- Seat: Milwaukee
- Largest city: Milwaukee

Government
  - Executive: David Crowley

Area
  - Total: 1,189 sq mi (3,080 km^{2})
  - Land: 241 sq mi (620 km^{2})
  - Water: 948 sq mi (2,460 km^{2}) 80%

Population (2020)
  - Total: 939,489
  - Estimate (2025): 924,216 ▼
  - Density: 3,900/sq mi (1,510/km^{2})
- Time zone: UTC−6 (Central)
  - Summer (DST): UTC−5 (CDT)
- Congressional districts: 1st, 4th, 5th
- Website: county.milwaukee.gov

Milwaukee County (/mɪlˈwɔːki/) is a county in the U.S. state of Wisconsin. The population was 939,489 at the 2020 census. It is both the most populous and most densely populated county in Wisconsin, containing about 15% of the state's population; it is also the 62nd-most populous county nationwide. The county seat is Milwaukee, the most populous city in Wisconsin. Named after the Milwaukee River, the county was created in 1834 as part of Michigan Territory and organized the following year. Milwaukee County is the most populous county of the Milwaukee metropolitan area, as well as of the Milwaukee–Racine–Waukesha combined statistical area.

Uniquely among Wisconsin counties, Milwaukee County is completely incorporated (i.e., no part of the county has the unincorporated "town" jurisdiction). There are 19 municipalities in Milwaukee County; 10 incorporated as cities and 9 incorporated as villages. After the city of Milwaukee, the most populous in 2020 were West Allis (60,325), Wauwatosa (48,387), Greenfield (37,803), Oak Creek (36,497), and Franklin (36,816). The county is home to two major-league professional sports teams, the Milwaukee Bucks and Milwaukee Brewers, and the world's largest music festival, Summerfest.

== History ==
Portions of what is now Milwaukee County are known to have been inhabited by a number of Native American tribes, including the Sauk, Meskwaki or "Fox", Menomonee, Ojibwe and Potawotami, with elements of other tribes attested as well.

In 1818, when the land later to be Wisconsin was made part of Michigan Territory, territorial governor Lewis Cass created Brown County, which at that time included all the land now part of Milwaukee County. It remained a part of Brown county until 1834, when Milwaukee County was created, including the area south of the line between townships eleven and twelve north (i.e., the northern boundary of Washington and Ozaukee counties), west of Lake Michigan, north of Illinois, and east of the line which now separates Green and Rock counties. This territory encompassed all of what are now Milwaukee, Jefferson, Kenosha, Ozaukee, Racine, Rock, Walworth, Washington, and Waukesha counties, as well as large parts of the present-day Columbia, Dane and Dodge counties.

Milwaukee County remained attached to Brown County for judicial purposes until August 25, 1835, when an act was passed by the Michigan territorial legislature giving it an independent organization. In 1836, the legislature divided the area south and east of the Wisconsin and Fox rivers into counties, as a consequence reducing Milwaukee County's extent to what is now Milwaukee and Waukesha counties. In 1846 Waukesha County was created by taking from Milwaukee all of the territory west of range 21, reducing Milwaukee County to its present boundaries.

The county peaked in its relative importance in Wisconsin in the 1930s–1960s, when about 25% of the state's population resided in Milwaukee County. Its population has been shrinking since 1970.

== Geography ==
According to the U.S. Census Bureau, the county has a total area of 1,189 square miles (3,080 km^{2}), of which 241 square miles (620 km^{2}) is land and 948 square miles (2,460 km^{2}) (80%) is water. It is the third-smallest county in Wisconsin by land area. It is watered by the Milwaukee, Menomonee, Kinnickinnic, and Root Rivers. The surface is undulating, and the soil calcareous and fertile.

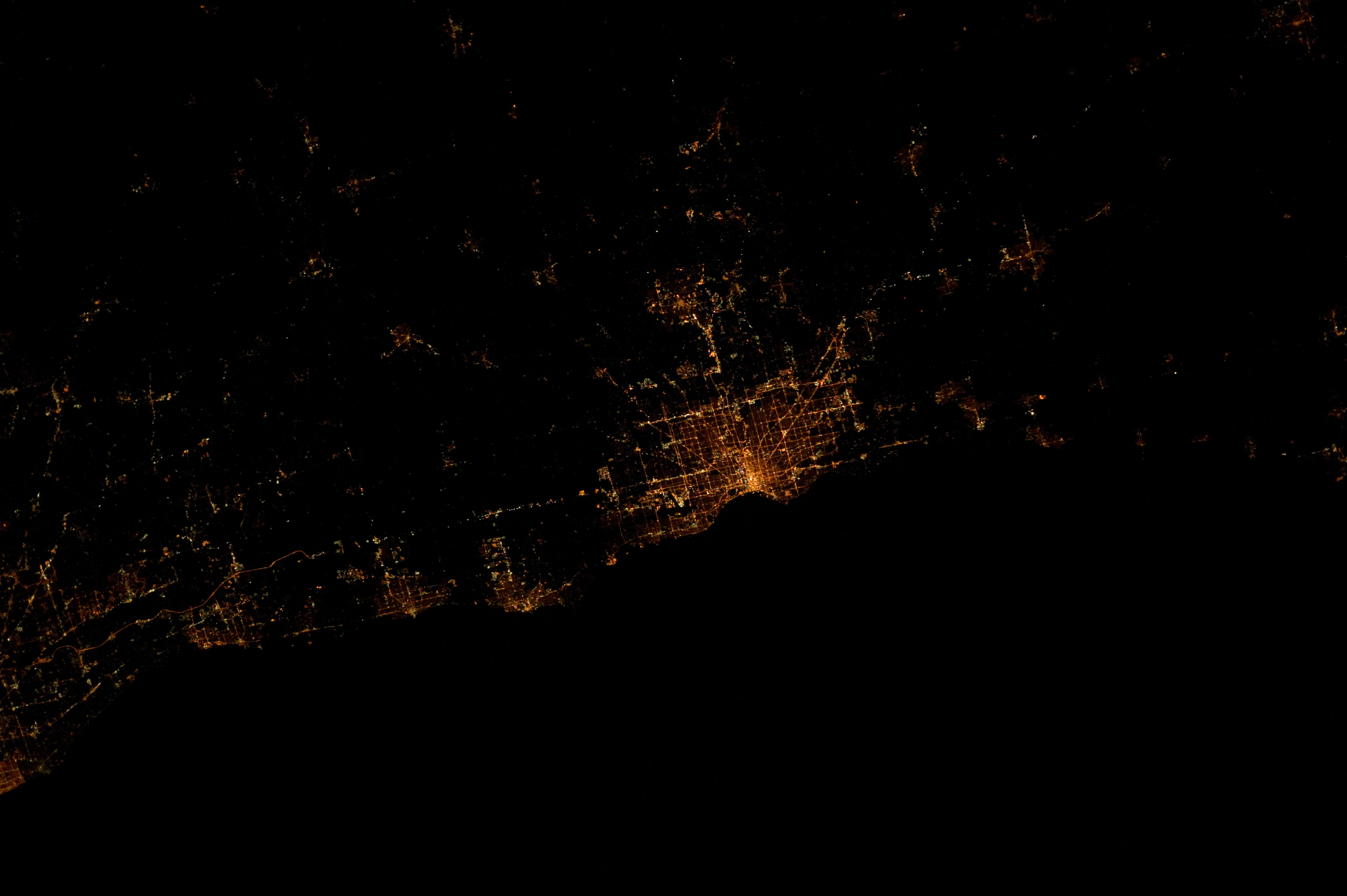
The city at the center is Milwaukee. The photo was taken at 11:23:40 PM CDT in 2012 during Expedition 30 at the International Space Station. Due to the angle of the photo, north points rightwards, and west upwards.

=== Adjacent counties ===
- Racine County – south
- Waukesha County – west
- Washington County – northwest
- Ozaukee County – north
- Muskegon County, Michigan – northeast (across Lake Michigan)
- Ottawa County, Michigan – east (across Lake Michigan)

=== Climate ===
Milwaukee County

Climate chart (precipitation, max. and min. temperature)
J	F	M	A	M	J	J	A	S	O	N	D
97 −4 −6	101 −6 −11	68 4 −5	165 11 3	111 11 3	138 15 9	100 22 16	95 24 14	67 19 14	92 14 8	64 8 2	78 2 −3
- █ Average max. and min. temperatures in °C
- █ Precipitation totals in mm
Imperial conversion
J	F	M	A	M	J	J	A	S	O	N	D
3.8 25 21	4 21 12	2.7 39 23	6.5 52 37	4.4 52 37	5.4 59 48	3.9 72 61	3.7 75 57	2.6 66 57	3.6 57 46	2.5 46 36	3.1 36 27
- █ Average max. and min. temperatures in °F
- █ Precipitation totals in inches

== Demographics ==
Historical population
Census	Pop.	Note	%±
1850	31,077		—
1860	62,518		101.2%
1870	89,930		43.8%
1880	138,537		54.0%
1890	236,101		70.4%
1900	330,017		39.8%
1910	433,187		31.3%
1920	539,449		24.5%
1930	725,263		34.4%
1940	766,885		5.7%
1950	871,047		13.6%
1960	1,036,041		18.9%
1970	1,054,063		1.7%
1980	964,988		−8.5%
1990	959,275		−0.6%
2000	940,164		−2.0%
2010	947,735		0.8%
2020	939,489		−0.9%
2025 (est.)	924,216	▼	−1.6%
U.S. Decennial Census; 1790–1960 1900–1990; 1990–2000 2010–2020 2020 census

2000 Census Age Pyramid for Milwaukee County

=== 2020 census ===
As of the 2020 census, the county had a population of 939,489. The population density was 3,890.5 people per square mile (1,502.1 people/km^{2}). There were 424,191 housing units at an average density of 1,756.6 units per square mile (678.2 units/km^{2}). 99.7% of residents lived in urban areas, while 0.3% lived in rural areas.

The median age was 35.3 years, with 23.3% of residents under 18 and 14.3% aged 65 or older. For every 100 females there were 93.7 males, and for every 100 females age 18 and over there were 90.8 males age 18 and over.

There were 393,601 households in the county, of which 28.2% had children under the age of 18 living in them, 32.9% were married-couple households, 23.3% were households with a male householder and no spouse or partner present, and 35.3% were households with a female householder and no spouse or partner present.

Of the 424,191 housing units, 7.2% were vacant. Among occupied housing units, 47.9% were owner-occupied and 52.1% were renter-occupied. The homeowner vacancy rate was 1.2% and the rental vacancy rate was 6.4%.

The racial makeup of the county was 52.0% White, 26.2% Black or African American, 0.8% American Indian and Alaska Native, 4.9% Asian, <0.1% Native Hawaiian and Pacific Islander, 6.8% from some other race, and 9.3% from two or more races. Hispanic or Latino residents of any race comprised 16.3% of the population.

=== Racial and ethnic composition ===
Milwaukee County, Wisconsin – Racial and ethnic composition Note: the US Census treats Hispanic/Latino as an ethnic category. This table excludes Latinos from the racial categories and assigns them to a separate category. Hispanics/Latinos may be of any race.
Race / ethnicity (NH = Non-Hispanic)	Pop 1980	Pop 1990	Pop 2000	Pop 2010	Pop 2020	% 1980	% 1990	% 2000	% 2010	% 2020
White alone (NH)	773,279	698,864	583,481	514,958	456,520	80.13%	72.85%	62.06%	54.34%	48.59%
Black or African American alone (NH)	148,307	193,583	228,471	248,794	240,416	15.37%	20.18%	24.30%	26.25%	25.59%
Native American or Alaska Native alone (NH)	5,835	6,291	5,735	5,212	3,878	0.60%	0.66%	0.61%	0.55%	0.41%
Asian alone (NH)	5,745	14,872	23,879	32,007	45,989	0.60%	1.55%	2.54%	3.38%	4.90%
Native Hawaiian or Pacific Islander alone (NH)	x	x	324	296	262	x	x	0.03%	0.03%	0.03%
Other race alone (NH)	2,479	994	1,259	1,139	4,227	0.26%	0.10%	0.13%	0.12%	0.45%
Mixed race or Multiracial (NH)	x	x	14,609	19,290	35,180	x	x	1.55%	2.04%	3.74%
Hispanic or Latino (any race)	29,343	44,671	82,406	126,039	153,017	3.04%	4.66%	8.77%	13.30%	16.29%
Total	964,988	959,275	940,164	947,735	939,489	100.00%	100.00%	100.00%	100.00%	100.00%

=== 2010 census ===
As of the 2010 census, there were 947,735 people, 383,591 households, and 221,019 families residing in the county. The population density was 3,932 people per square mile (1,518 people/km^{2}). There were 418,053 housing units at an average density of 1,734 units per square mile (670 units/km^{2}). The racial makeup of the county was 60.6% White, 26.8% Black or African American, 0.7% Native American, 3.4% Asian, 0.003% Pacific Islander, 5.4% from other races, and 3.0% from two or more races. 13.3% of the population were Hispanic or Latino of any race.

There were 383,591 households, of which 28.0% had children under the age of 18 living with them, 35.1% were married couples living together, 17.4% had a female householder with no husband present, and 42.4% were non-families. 33.7% of all households were made up of individuals, and 10.1% had someone living alone who was 65 years of age or older. The average household size was 2.41 and the average family size was 3.14.

In the county, the age distribution was spread out, with 24.9% under the age of 18, 11.4% from 18 to 24, 28.1% from 25 to 44, 24.1% from 45 to 64, and 11.5% who were 65 years of age or older. The median age was 33.6 years. For every 100 females there were 93.4 males. For every 100 females age 18 and over, there were 90.2 males.

=== 2000 census ===
As of the 2000 census, there were 940,164 people, 377,729 households and 225,126 families resided in the county. The population density was 3,931 people per square mile (1,518 people/km^{2}). There were 400,093 housing units at an average density of 1,656 units per square mile (639 units/km^{2}). The racial makeup of the county was 65.6% White, 24.6% Black or African American, 0.7% Native American, 2.6% Asian, 0.04% Pacific Islander, 4.2% from other races, and 2.2% from two or more races. 8.8% of the population were Hispanic or Latino of any race. 25.0% were of German, 10.9% Polish and 5.3% Irish ancestry.

There were 377,729 households, of which 29.5% had children under the age of 18 living with them, 39.0% were married couples living together, 16.3% had a female householder with no husband present, and 40.4% were non-families. 33.0% of all households were made up of individuals, and 10.7% had someone living alone who was 65 years of age or older. The average household size was 2.43 and the average family size was 3.13.

In the county, the age distribution was spread out, with 26.4% under the age of 18, 10.5% from 18 to 24, 30.3% from 25 to 44, 20.0% from 45 to 64, and 12.9% who were 65 years of age or older. The median age was 34 years. For every 100 females there were 92.0 males. For every 100 females age 18 and over, there were 88.1 males.

According to the U.S. Census Bureau, from 1980 to 2000, the residential pattern of Blacks versus Whites in Milwaukee County was the most segregated in the country.

=== Birth related statistics ===
In 2017, there were 13,431 births, giving a general fertility rate of 63.8 births per 1000 women aged 15–44, which is slightly above the Wisconsin average of 60.1. Additionally, there were 2,347 reported induced abortions performed on women of Milwaukee County residence, with a rate of 11.1 abortions per 1000 women aged 15–44, which is above the Wisconsin average rate of 5.2.

=== Religious statistics ===
In 2010 statistics, the largest religious group in Milwaukee County was the Archdiocese of Milwaukee, with 199,153 Catholics worshipping at 80 parishes, followed by 32,340 non-denominational adherents with 126 congregations, 28,274 Missouri Synod Lutherans with 44 congregations, 23,043 ELCA Lutherans with 50 congregations, 20,416 Wisconsin Synod Lutherans with 45 congregations, 18,127 NBC Baptists with 27 congregations, 12,191 CoGiC Pentecostals with 28 congregations, 12,121 SBC Baptists with 32 congregations, 10,960 AoG Pentecostals with 20 congregations, and an estimated 9,156 Muslims with 8 congregations. Altogether, 46.4% of the population was claimed as members by religious congregations, although members of historically African-American denominations were underrepresented due to incomplete information. In 2014, Milwaukee County had 483 religious organizations, the 48th most out of all 3,141 US counties.

== Government ==
Milwaukee County is governed through an eighteen-member Board of Supervisors and by an elected county executive. County supervisors, the county executive, and the county comptroller run in nonpartisan elections while other countywide officials, such as the district attorney and sheriff, run in partisan elections.

Office	Officeholder	Party
Executive	David Crowley	Nonpartisan
Comptroller	Liz Sumner	Nonpartisan
Sheriff	Denita Ball	Democratic
Clerk	George Christenson	Democratic
Treasurer	David Cullen	Democratic
Register of Deeds	Israel Ramon	Democratic
Clerk of Circuit Court	Anna Hodges	Democratic
District Attorney	Kent Lovern	Democratic

== Politics ==
Like most urban counties, Milwaukee County is a Democratic stronghold, having voted for the Democratic presidential nominee in every election since 1960, and in all but four since 1912.

United States presidential election results for Milwaukee County, Wisconsin
Year	Republican		Democratic		Third party(ies)	
Year	No.	%	No.	%	No.	%
1892	24,602	48.23%	24,607	48.24%	1,799	3.53%
1896	35,939	55.85%	26,536	41.24%	1,869	2.90%
1900	34,790	52.52%	25,596	38.64%	5,857	8.84%
1904	32,587	46.21%	18,560	26.32%	19,365	27.46%
1908	28,625	38.97%	26,000	35.40%	18,831	25.64%
1912	17,877	25.07%	27,628	38.75%	25,797	36.18%
1916	27,831	34.78%	34,812	43.51%	17,368	21.71%
1920	73,410	51.58%	25,464	17.89%	43,437	30.52%
1924	50,730	34.27%	14,510	9.80%	82,789	55.93%
1928	82,025	39.77%	110,668	53.66%	13,544	6.57%
1932	54,693	21.09%	170,202	65.62%	34,493	13.30%
1936	54,811	18.46%	221,512	74.59%	20,635	6.95%
1940	131,120	37.34%	209,861	59.76%	10,216	2.91%
1944	142,448	40.15%	205,282	57.85%	7,100	2.00%
1948	138,672	40.44%	187,637	54.72%	16,601	4.84%
1952	219,477	51.52%	204,474	48.00%	2,055	0.48%
1956	227,253	55.79%	177,286	43.53%	2,779	0.68%
1960	187,067	41.96%	257,707	57.81%	1,033	0.23%
1964	149,962	34.12%	288,577	65.67%	920	0.21%
1968	160,022	39.81%	206,027	51.26%	35,887	8.93%
1972	191,874	46.05%	210,802	50.59%	14,001	3.36%
1976	192,008	42.09%	249,739	54.75%	14,413	3.16%
1980	183,450	39.54%	240,174	51.76%	40,384	8.70%
1984	196,290	42.86%	259,144	56.58%	2,583	0.56%
1988	168,363	38.30%	268,287	61.04%	2,895	0.66%
1992	151,314	32.51%	235,521	50.60%	78,661	16.90%
1996	119,407	32.15%	216,620	58.33%	35,353	9.52%
2000	163,491	37.71%	252,329	58.20%	17,717	4.09%
2004	180,287	37.39%	297,653	61.72%	4,296	0.89%
2008	149,445	31.45%	319,819	67.30%	5,928	1.25%
2012	154,924	31.45%	332,438	67.49%	5,214	1.06%
2016	126,069	28.58%	288,822	65.48%	26,162	5.93%
2020	134,482	29.25%	317,527	69.07%	7,714	1.68%
2024	138,022	29.74%	316,292	68.15%	9,793	2.11%

However, there have been some notable exceptions. Former County Sheriff David Clarke, while repeatedly nominated and elected as a Democrat, was initially appointed by Republican governor Scott McCallum (the successor of Tommy Thompson), stated that he considered himself nonpartisan, and espoused politically conservative positions. Former County Executive Scott Walker was a Republican member of the Wisconsin State Assembly before being elected county executive in a 2002 special election after Tom Ament's resignation in a county pension scandal, and elected to full terms in 2004 and 2008, though the office of county executive is nonpartisan. Thompson himself won Milwaukee County in his 1994 and 1998 reelection campaigns—to date, the last time a statewide Republican candidate won the county.

In May 2019, the Milwaukee County executive became the first local government in the US to issue a declaration stating that racism constitutes a public health emergency.

== Transportation ==
Bus service in Milwaukee County is provided by the Milwaukee County Transit System, which operates almost 370 buses. The city of Milwaukee also operates The Hop tram system in the downtown area.

=== Airports ===
- Milwaukee Mitchell International Airport (KMKE) is located in Milwaukee and serves the entire metropolitan area. It has scheduled service to cities across the United States as well as Canada and Mexico.
- Lawrence J. Timmerman Airport (KMWC) also serves the county and surrounding communities.

=== Railroads ===
- Amtrak
- Canadian Pacific Kansas City
- Union Pacific
- Wisconsin and Southern Railroad
- Milwaukee Intermodal Station
- Milwaukee Airport Railroad Station
- The Hop (streetcar)

=== Buses ===
- Milwaukee County Transit System

=== Major highways ===
- Interstate 41
- Interstate 43
- Interstate 94
- Interstate 794
- Interstate 894
- U.S. Highway 18
- U.S. Highway 41
- U.S. Highway 45
- Highway 24
- Highway 32
- Highway 36
- Highway 38
- Highway 57
- Highway 59
- Highway 100
- Highway 119
- Highway 145
- Highway 175
- Highway 181
- Highway 190
- Highway 241
- Highway 794

== Communities ==
Interactive map of municipalities in Milwaukee County.

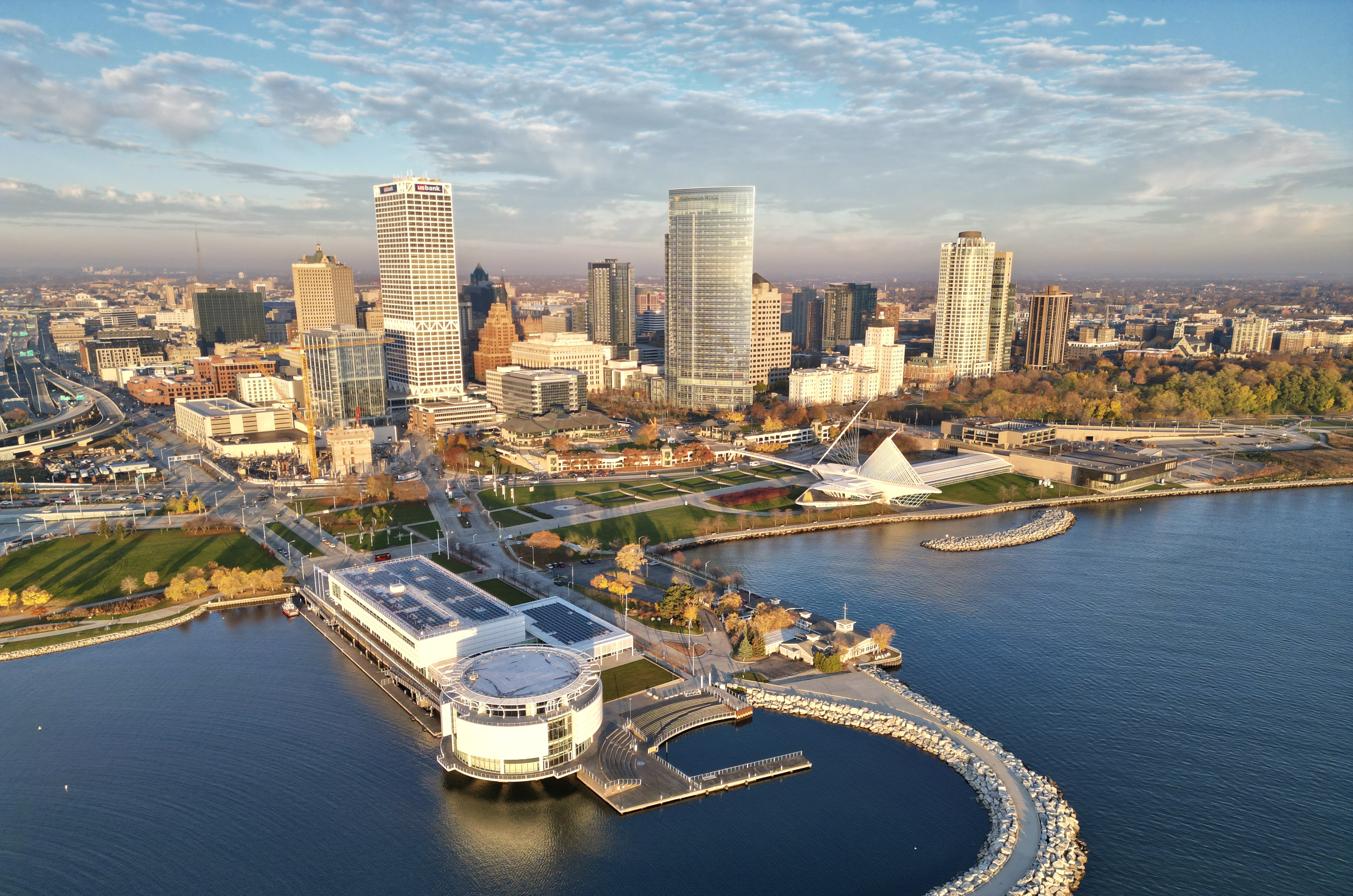
Milwaukee, Wisconsin's largest city

=== Cities ===
- Cudahy
- Franklin
- Glendale
- Greenfield
- Milwaukee (county seat) – partly in Waukesha and Washington Counties
- Oak Creek
- South Milwaukee
- St. Francis
- Wauwatosa
- West Allis

=== Villages ===
- Bayside (partly in Ozaukee County)
- Brown Deer
- Fox Point
- Greendale
- Hales Corners
- River Hills
- Shorewood
- West Milwaukee
- Whitefish Bay

=== Former towns/neighborhoods ===
- Bay View
- Good Hope
- Granville
- Lake
- Town of Milwaukee
- New Coeln
- North Milwaukee
- Oakwood
- Root Creek
- St. Martin's

== Education ==
School districts include:

K-12:

- Brown Deer School District
- Cudahy School District
- Franklin Public School District
- Greendale School District
- Greenfield School District
- Milwaukee School District
- Oak Creek-Franklin School District
- St. Francis School District
- Shorewood School District
- South Milwaukee School District
- Wauwatosa School District
- West Allis School District
- Whitefish Bay School District
- Whitnall School District

Secondary:

- Nicolet Union High School District

Elementary:

- Fox Point Joint No. 2 School District
- Glendale-River Hills School District
- Maple Dale-Indian Hill School District

Charter schools:

- Hmong American Peace Academy

== See also ==
- Hunger Task Force, Inc.
- National Register of Historic Places listings in Milwaukee County, Wisconsin
