= John Knowlton =

John Knowlton may refer to:

- John James Knowlton (1841–1903), member of the Wisconsin State Assembly
- John S.C. Knowlton (1798–1871), American newspaper editor, publisher and politician in Massachusetts
