= Winfield Smith =

19th century American lawyer, 8th Attorney General of Wisconsin

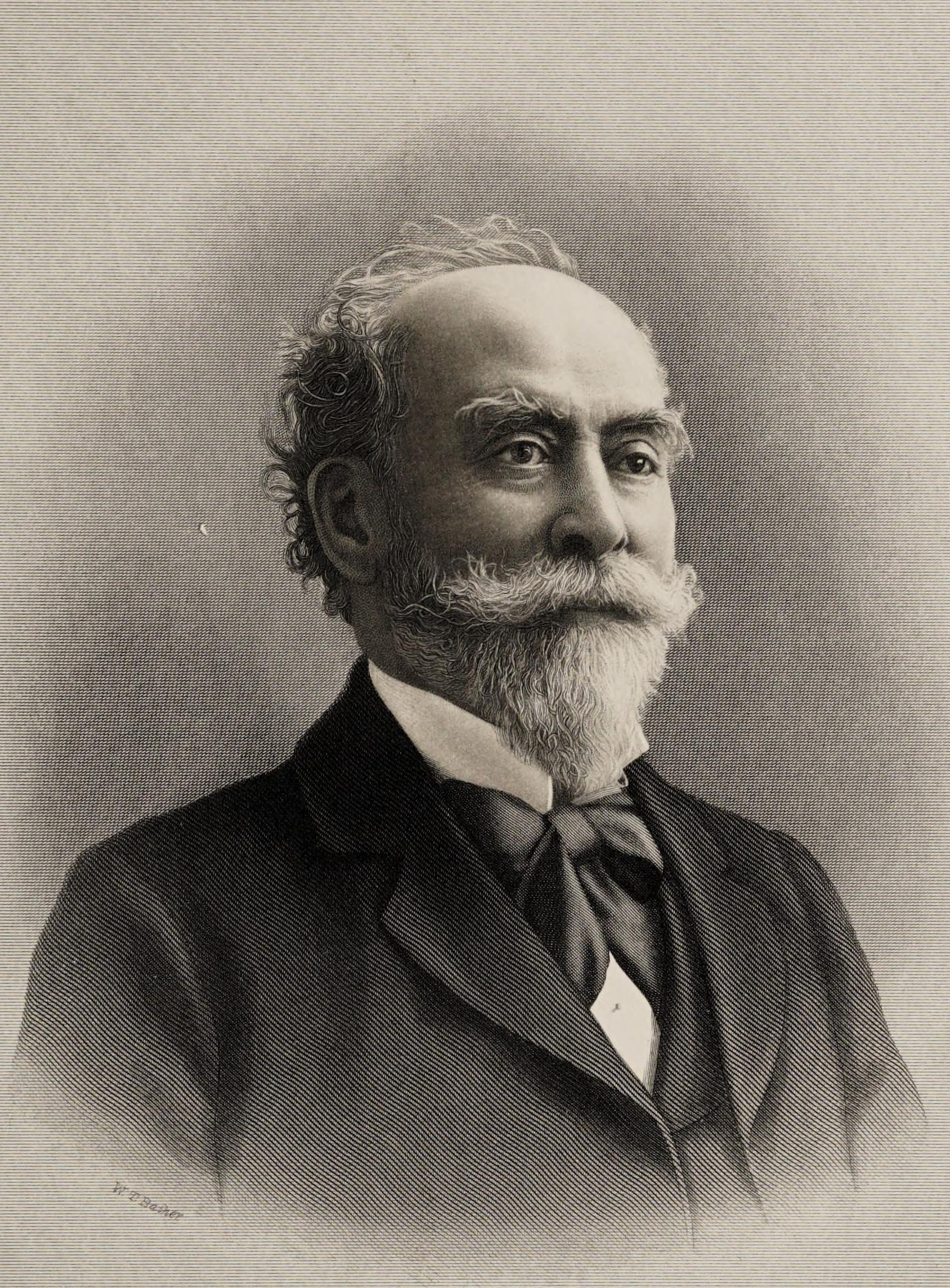

8th Attorney General of Wisconsin
- In office October 7, 1862 – January 1, 1866
- Appointed by: Edward Salomon
- Governor: Edward Salomon; James T. Lewis
- Preceded by: James Henry Howe
- Succeeded by: Charles R. Gill

Member of the Wisconsin State Assembly from the Milwaukee 7th district
- In office January 1, 1872 – January 1, 1873
- Preceded by: Matthew Keenan
- Succeeded by: Henry L. Palmer

Personal details
- Born: August 16, 1827 Fort Howard, Michigan Territory
- Died: November 8, 1899 (aged 72) London, UK
- Cause of death: Angina pectoris
- Resting place: Mayflower Cemetery, Duxbury, Massachusetts
- Party: Republican; Democratic (before 1854)
- Spouse: Sarah Melinda Fellows (died 1913)
- Children: Anna Elvina (Emerson)^{(b. 1866; died 1903)}; Winfield Robert Smith^{(b. 1866; died 1943)}; Evelyn Foster (Stafford)^{(died 1894)}; Grace Smith; Harry Smith; Mrs. (Adsit); 1 other daughter
- Parents: Henry Smith (father); Elvira Foster (mother)
- Education: University of Michigan

Winfield Scott Smith (August 16, 1827 – November 8, 1899) was an American lawyer, Republican politician, and Wisconsin pioneer. He was the 8th Attorney General of Wisconsin and served one term in the Wisconsin State Assembly, representing part of the city of Milwaukee during the 1872 session.

== Early life and career ==
Smith was born on August 16, 1827, at Fort Howard, near Green Bay, where his father was stationed. The area was then part of the Michigan Territory. He was named in honor of U.S. Army General Winfield Scott, who his father had served under.

His father was Captain Henry Smith of the United States Army 6th Infantry Regiment. Captain Smith was born in New York, and came west with the army. In 1833, when Winfield Smith was six, the family relocated to Monroe, Michigan. His father fought in the Black Hawk War in Illinois in the 1830s, but afterward went to work on harbor improvements on Lake Erie and served two terms in the Michigan Legislature.

As a newly established state, there were few schools or formal education opportunities for Winfield. Thus he was mostly educated by his parents until age 17, when he was able to attend the University of Michigan, where he graduated in 1846. He returned to Monroe and ran a school for a year, before becoming a private tutor. He was intent on becoming educated in the law, and, in 1848, began study in the offices of Isaac P. Christiancy, who would later serve as a justice of the Michigan Supreme Court and a United States senator.

In 1847, at the outbreak of the Mexican–American War, his father returned to the Army as a quartermaster. He died of Yellow fever while on campaign in Mexico, July 24, 1847.

In 1849, Winfield moved west to Milwaukee, and was employed in the office of Emmons & Van Dyke, where he continued to study law. In February 1850, he was admitted to the State Bar of Wisconsin in the presence of Judge Edward V. Whiton. He maintained a private law office for the next five years, before forming a partnership with Edward Salomon, who would later become Governor of Wisconsin. He remained associated with Salomon for fifteen years, before and after their time in public office, until Salomon's departure to New York.

Shortly after his admission to the bar, he was appointed by United States District Judge Andrew G. Miller as a court commissioner and master of chancery in Milwaukee. In 1859, he was offered the Republican Party nomination for Wisconsin State Senate, but declined.

== Public office ==
In 1862, when James Henry Howe resigned his office to volunteer with the Union Army, Smith's former law partner, Governor Edward Salomon, appointed him to fill the vacancy as Attorney General of Wisconsin. Smith was elected to remain in office for a full term in 1863, and left office in January 1866.

As Attorney General, Smith settled the decade old case of the Milwaukee and Rock River Canal Company's claims against the state, which arose from an abandoned canal plan on lands granted from the United States to the Wisconsin Territory. It involved extensive research and litigation, and was culminated in a negotiated agreement at Washington, D.C.

The American Civil War also loomed over his term as Attorney General, as he had to defend the constitutionality of the draft, and the Governor's powers to enforce it. There had been draft riots in Milwaukee and Ozaukee counties, and Smith successfully argued to the Wisconsin Supreme Court in favor of Governor Salomon's acts to imprison these dissenters at a military camp in Madison, Wisconsin.

He returned to private practice after 1866, and, in 1869, formed a partnership with Joshua Stark, known as Smith & Stark. In 1871, he was elected to the Wisconsin State Assembly from Milwaukee County's 7th district on the Republican ticket, though he did not actively pursue the office. In the 1872 session, he was chairman of the committee on the judiciary. His chief legislative accomplishment was the passage of a law which enabled the state school trust fund to loan money to the city of Milwaukee for the construction of water works, thus putting money to use that was otherwise sitting idle in state accounts, and enabling an important public improvement in the city. He was also a supporter of an increased appropriation to the University of Wisconsin, and an act which enabled soldiers serving outside the state to cast votes in state elections.

== Later years ==
After leaving the Assembly, Smith determined to remain in private practice and refused several opportunities for further public office. He declined the United States District Court judgeship in the Eastern District of Wisconsin in 1872, on the retirement of Judge Andrew G. Miller, and again in 1875, on the resignation of Judge James Henry Howe. In 1876, he was offered appointment as United States Attorney in Wisconsin, to succeed Judge Levi Hubbell, but declined. He was urged to seek election to the Wisconsin Supreme Court on the death of Chief Justice Edward George Ryan, in 1880, but again declined.

In business, Smith was a successful investor. He had a large stake in the Cream City Street Railroad and was president of the company for a number of years. In 1890, the company sold its assets and Smith returned a large profit, which he further invested into the Menominee Falls Quarry and the Milwaukee & Superior Railway Company, of which he also became president.

In his later years, he made several trips to Europe with his family. On one such trip to London with his daughter, he was struck by angina pectoris and died.

== Family ==
Smith was married and had at least six children. He was survived by his wife and five of his children.

- His daughter Anna married Dr. Nathaniel W. Emerson of Boston
- Grace Smith also lived in Boston
- another daughter moved to London
- Harry Smith lived in Edgewater, Chicago
- Winfield Robert Smith moved to Seattle

His daughter Evelyn died before him, in 1894. She was a stage performer who married the actor William Stafford, and used the stage name Evelyn Foster Stafford. They had a Shakespearean theater company known as the Stafford-Foster Company.

== Electoral history ==
=== Wisconsin Attorney General (1863) ===
Wisconsin Attorney General Election, 1863
| Party | Candidate | Votes | % | ±% |
|---|---|---|---|---|
General Election, November 3, 1863
| Republican | Winfield Smith (incumbent) | 72,794 | 59.70% | +3.83% |
| Democratic | Eleazer Wakeley | 49,117 | 40.28% | −3.76% |
| | Scattering | 31 | 0.03% | |
| Plurality | | 23,677 | 19.42% | +7.59% |
| Total votes | | 121,942 | 100.0% | +23.04% |
| Republican hold | | | | |

=== Wisconsin Assembly (1871) ===
Wisconsin Assembly, Milwaukee 7th District Election, 1871
| Party | Candidate | Votes | % | ±% |
|---|---|---|---|---|
General Election, November 7, 1871
| Republican | Winfield Smith | 485 | 53.71% | +14.92% |
| Democratic | Anthony Dahlmann | 418 | 46.29% | |
| Plurality | | 67 | 7.42% | -14.99% |
| Total votes | | 903 | 100.0% | -13.51% |
| Republican gain from Democratic | | | | |

Party political offices
| Preceded by James Henry Howe | Republican nominee for Attorney General of Wisconsin; 1863 | Succeeded by Charles R. Gill |
Wisconsin State Assembly
| Preceded by Matthew Keenan | Member of the Wisconsin State Assembly from the Milwaukee 7th district January 1, 1872 – January 1, 1873 | Succeeded by Henry L. Palmer |
Legal offices
| Preceded by James Henry Howe | Attorney General of Wisconsin; October 7, 1862 – January 1, 1866 | Succeeded by Charles R. Gill |
