= Daniel Harris Johnson =

American lawyer and judge

The Honorable Daniel H. Johnson
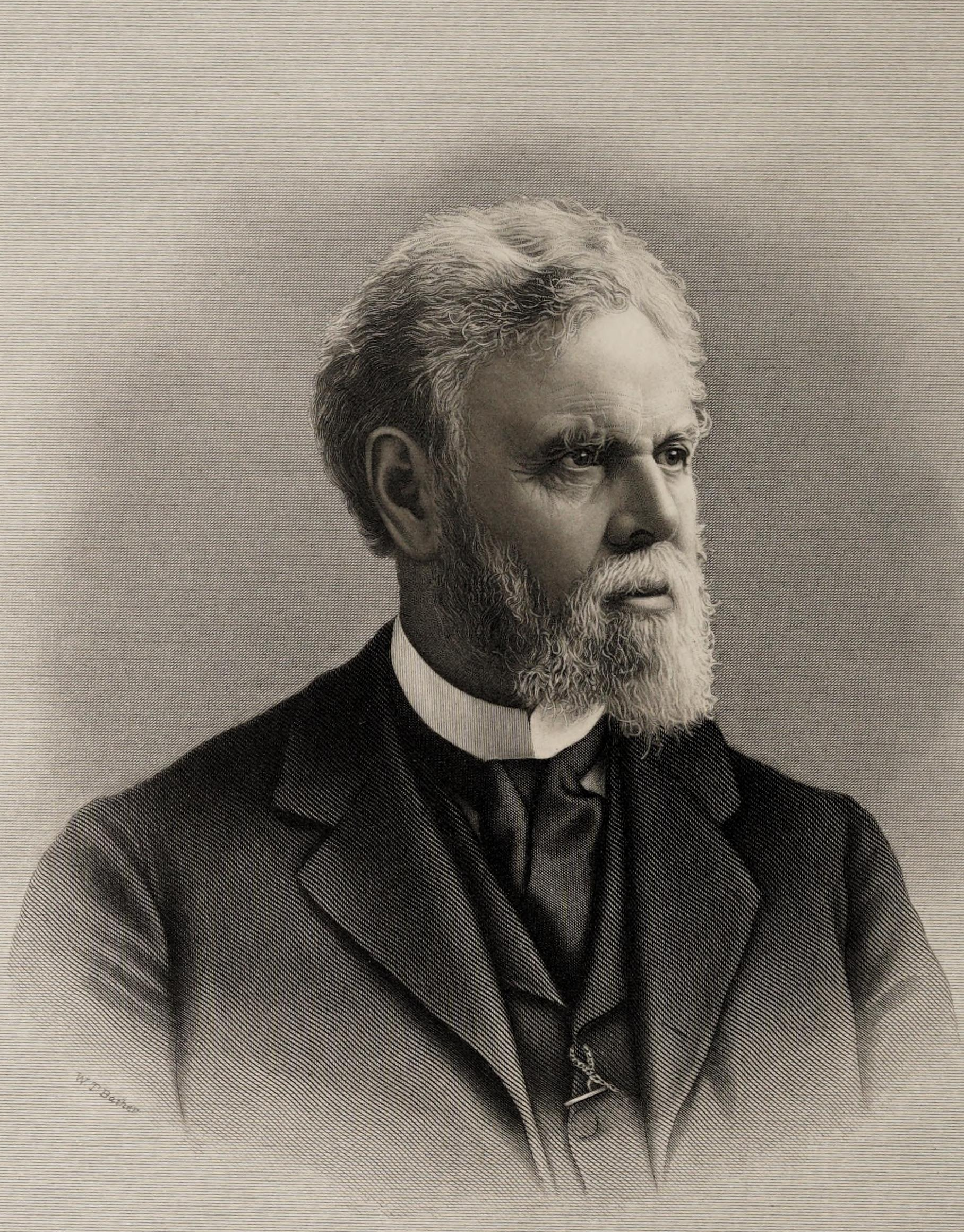

Wisconsin Circuit Court Judge for the 2nd Circuit, Branch 1
- In office January 1, 1900 – June 15, 1900
- Preceded by: Position Established
- Succeeded by: Lawrence W. Halsey

Wisconsin Circuit Court Judge for the 2nd Circuit
- In office January 2, 1888 – January 1, 1900
- Preceded by: Charles A. Hamilton
- Succeeded by: Position Abolished

Member of the Wisconsin State Assembly from the Milwaukee 7th district
- In office January 1, 1869 – January 1, 1871
- Preceded by: Patrick Walsh
- Succeeded by: Matthew Keenan

Member of the Wisconsin State Assembly from the Bad Ax–Crawford district
- In office January 1, 1861 – January 1, 1862
- Preceded by: William C. McMichael
- Succeeded by: Ormsby B. Thomas (Crawford); Ole C. Johnson (Bad Ax 1st); Jeremiah McLain Rusk (Bad Ax 2nd)

Personal details
- Born: Daniel Harris Johnson; July 27, 1825 Kingston, Upper Canada
- Died: June 15, 1900 (aged 74) Milwaukee County, Wisconsin
- Resting place: Forest Home Cemetery; Milwaukee, Wisconsin
- Party: Democratic; Republican (before 1872)
- Spouses: Electa Amanda Wright; (died 1929)
- Children: Kate Johnson; (b. 1861; died 1892)
- Occupation: Lawyer, judge

Daniel Harris Johnson (July 27, 1825 – June 15, 1900) was an American lawyer and judge. He was a Wisconsin Circuit Court judge for the last twelve years of his life. Earlier he served three terms in the Wisconsin State Assembly.

== Biography ==
Johnson was born in Kingston, Ontario, which was then part of Upper Canada. His father died just two years after his birth. He had been a British Army sergeant under Wellington in the War of 1812, who remained in Canada after the war. His mother was daughter of an American Revolutionary War volunteer. After attending Rock River Seminary, Johnson moved to Prairie du Chien, Wisconsin, in 1848. Here, he began the study of law, and, in 1849, was admitted to the State Bar of Wisconsin.

He practiced law in Prairie du Chien for several years, but, in 1854, he purchased a stake in the Prairie du Chien Courier, and soon became its sole proprietor and editor. He returned to the practice of law in 1856, forming a partnership with W. R. Bullock, a nephew of John C. Breckinridge. The partnership was broken by the American Civil War, when Bullock joined with the Confederacy.

In November 1860, Johnson was elected on the Republican Party ticket to represent Crawford and Bad Ax (Vernon) counties in the Wisconsin State Assembly during the 14th Wisconsin Legislature. After the legislative session ended, in the fall of 1861, he worked as an assistant to Wisconsin Attorney General James Henry Howe.

In November 1862, he moved to Milwaukee and, for the next 16 years, practiced law with a number of different legal firms in the city. In 1868, Milwaukee voters elected him to return to the Wisconsin Assembly. He was re-elected in 1869. In the 1869 session of the legislature, he was chairman of the committee on education, and in 1870, he was chairman of the committee on the judiciary.

After serving in the Assembly as a Republican, he became associated with the Liberal Republican faction in the so-called "Greeley movement", named for Horace Greeley. He was a delegate for Wisconsin to the 1872 Liberal Republican convention in Cincinnati which nominated Greeley for president. Greeley was subsequently also nominated by the Democratic Party, and, from that point on, Johnson became affiliated with the Democratic Party. He served in various local offices over the next decade, as city attorney and member of the Milwaukee School Board.

In 1887, he was elected to the Wisconsin Circuit Court for the Milwaukee-based 2nd Circuit. He was re-elected without opposition in 1893, and, in 1899, when the circuit was split into two branches, he was one of the two judges elected. He died, however, just six months after the start of his third term.

He died on June 15, 1900, in Milwaukee, Wisconsin.

== Electoral history ==
Wisconsin Circuit Court, 2nd Circuit Election, 1887
Party	Candidate	Votes	%	±%
General Election, April 5, 1887
Nonpartisan	Daniel H. Johnson	14,606	52.54%	
Nonpartisan	Newton S. Murphy	13,192	47.45%	
	Scattering	2	0.01%	
Total votes		27,800	100.0%	

Wisconsin Circuit Court, 2nd Circuit Election, 1893
Party	Candidate	Votes	%	±%
General Election, April 1893
Nonpartisan	Daniel H. Johnson (incumbent)	30,653	100.0%	
Total votes		30,653	100.0%	+10.26%

Wisconsin Circuit Court, 2nd Circuit Election, 1899
Party	Candidate	Votes	%	±%
General Election, April 4, 1899 (top two)
Nonpartisan	Eugene S. Elliott	9,742	25.91%	
Nonpartisan	Daniel H. Johnson (incumbent)	6,275	16.69%	
Nonpartisan	Frederick W. Cotzhausen	5,292	14.07%	
Nonpartisan	James H. Stover	5,062	13.46%	
Nonpartisan	Jerred Thompson, Jr.	3,470	9.23%	
Nonpartisan	John M. Clarke	3,431	9.12%	
Nonpartisan	Joseph E. Wildish	2,883	7.67%	
Nonpartisan	Daniel J. Dalton	833	2.22%	
Nonpartisan	Frederick Starr Fish	614	1.63%	
Total votes		37,602	100.0%	+22.67%

Legal offices
Preceded by Charles A. Hamilton	Wisconsin Circuit Court Judge for the 2nd Circuit; 1888 – 1900	Succeeded by Circuit split
Preceded by New branch	Wisconsin Circuit Court Judge for the 2nd Circuit, Branch 1; 1900	Succeeded by Lawrence W. Halsey
