= 29th Wisconsin Infantry Regiment =

Union Army infantry regiment

- Flag of Wisconsin
- Active: September 27, 1862 – June 22, 1865
- Country: United States
- Allegiance: Union
- Branch: Infantry
- Size: Regiment
- Engagements: American Civil War: Vicksburg Campaign; Battle of Port Gibson; Battle of Champion Hill; Siege of Vicksburg; Jackson Expedition; Red River Campaign; Battle of Sabine Cross Roads

Commanders
- Colonel: Charles R. Gill
- Colonel: William A. Greene
- Lt. Colonel: Bradford Hancock

The 29th Wisconsin Infantry Regiment was a volunteer infantry regiment that served in the Union Army during the American Civil War.

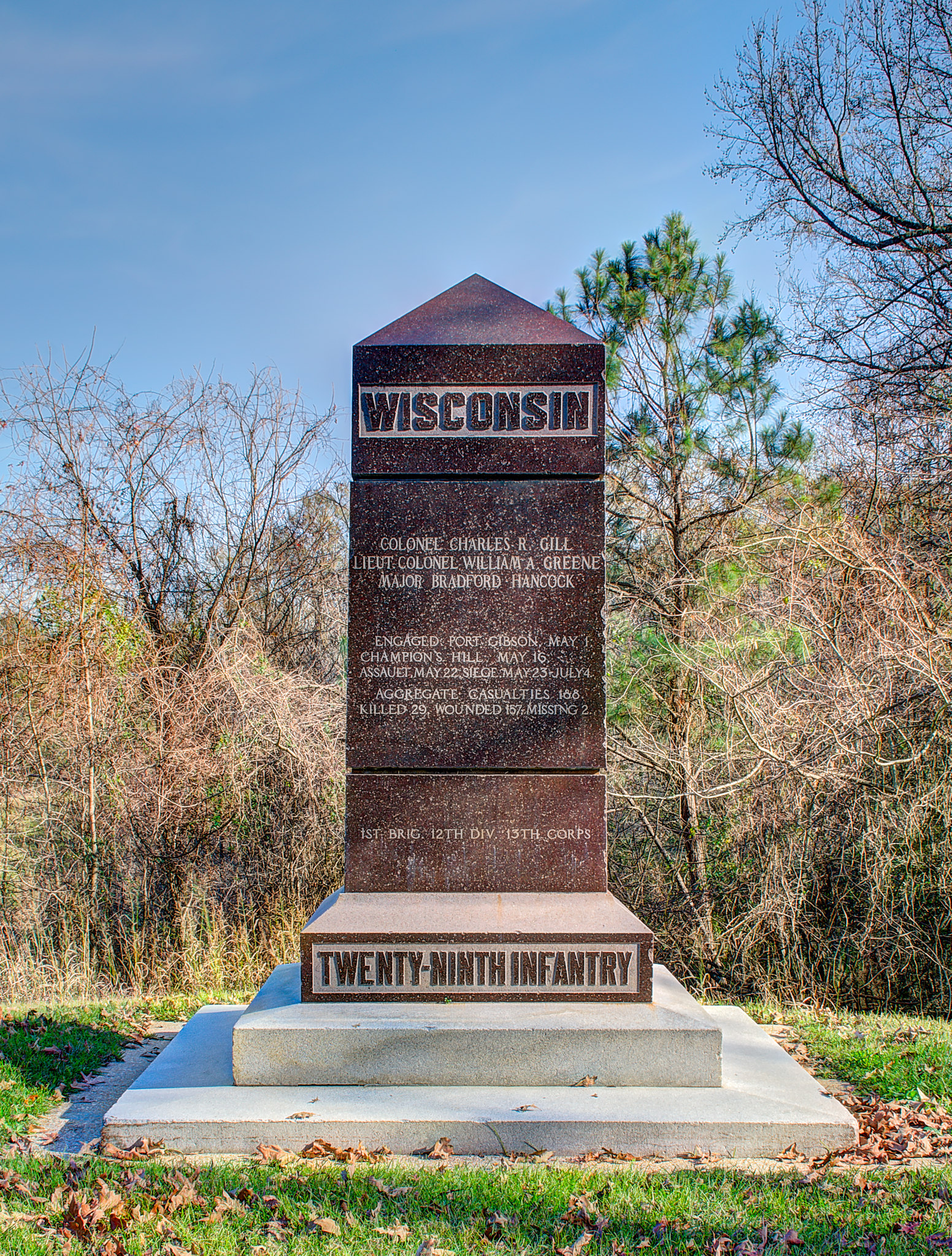
Monument to the 29th Wisconsin Infantry at Vicksburg National Military Park

== Service ==
The 29th Wisconsin was organized at Madison, Wisconsin, and mustered into Federal service September 27, 1862.

The regiment was mustered out on June 22, 1865, at Shreveport, Louisiana.

== Casualties ==
The 29th Wisconsin suffered 1 officer and 76 enlisted men killed in action or who later died of their wounds, plus another 3 officers and 242 enlisted men who died of disease, for a total of 322 fatalities.

== Commanders ==
- Colonel Charles R. Gill (September 27, 1862 – July 9, 1863) resigned.
- Colonel William A. Greene (July 9, 1863 – January 26, 1865) resigned.
- Lt. Colonel Bradford Hancock (January 26, 1865 – June 22, 1865) mustered out with the regiment.

== Notable people ==
- Ignatz Koser was born in Baden, Germany on May 15, 1825 and served in the military service in Germany for six years during the German revolutions of 1848-1849. His knowledge of war matters provided valuable when he served in the American Civil War. He came to the United States and moved to Fort Atkinson, WI after residing in the city of New York for two years. On August 15, 1862, he enlisted as a volunteer in Company D, 29th Wisconsin Infantry Regiment. He was made a Corporal after his enlistment, and soon after promoted to Sergeant. In April 1863, he marched to make connection with General Ulysses S. Grant and his army and were the first to fight in the Battle of Port Gibson on May 1, 1863. Approximately two weeks later on May 16, 1863, he fought at the Battle of Champion Hill near Edwards, MS and then went on to fight at the Siege of Vicksburg. It was only an hour after the surrender at Vickburg when the 29th Wisconsin Infantry Regiment was ordered to march out to Jackson, MS which was 40 miles east. As an acting Sergeant in command of a picket (military) line near a fort that was occupied by Confederate troops close to Jackson, Mr. Koser was shot by a bullet which entered his left cheek and exited out of his ear, destroying his hearing. That same bullet struck a man standing in back of Mr. Koser in the throat, but his neck wounds were not life threatening as the bullet was slowed down with the initial impact to Mr. Koser. Despite being shot in the head and surviving, Mr. Koser continued to fight with his squad and stationed them in an orchard. After two volleys of fighting with the Confederates, firing ceased in the nighttime and his line was drawn in. The Confederates retreated and the 29th Wisconsin Infantry Regiment returned to Vicksburg. In August 1863, the 29th Wisconsin Infantry Regiment was transferred to the Department of the Gulf, participating in the Bayou Teche Campaign and then marched to Texas. He fought with the 29th Wisconsin Infantry Regiment at the Battle of Mansfield (also known as the Battle of Sabine Crossroads). Following this skirmish, they marched to Alexandria, LA and assisted in the building of the celebrated Bailey's Dam and assisted in closing operations after the Battle of Spanish Fort near Mobile, AL. Mr. Koser and the 29th Wisconsin Infantry Regiment then went to Mobile, AL and returned to Shreveport, LA where he mustered out his period of enlistment on June 22, 1865.
- David Whitney Curtis was first lieutenant in Co. D and then captain of Co. A. Later in the war, he was detailed to the staff of General James R. Slack. After the war he became a Wisconsin state legislator.
- Charles A. Holmes was captain of Co. F throughout the regiment's four years of service and was wounded at Champion Hill. After the war he served in the Nebraska state legislature and the University of Nebraska board of regents. His wife, Jennie Florella Holmes, became prominent in the women's suffrage movement.
- John James Knowlton was a corporal in Co. I. After the war he became a Wisconsin state legislator.
- Francis Persons, half brother of James H. Persons, was enlisted in Co. I and was killed at Champion Hill.
- James H. Persons was a sergeant in Co. I, and was taken prisoner at Champion Hill. After the war he became a Wisconsin state legislator.
- Gerrit T. Thorn was lieutenant colonel of the regiment, but resigned after only a few months of service. After the war he became a Wisconsin state senator.
- George Weeks was enlisted in Co. A and later commissioned first lieutenant, he resigned in June 1863, but re-enlisted with the 36th Wisconsin Infantry Regiment and was commissioned captain of Co. B in that regiment. After the war he became a Wisconsin state legislator, and was later sheriff of Dane County, Wisconsin and warden of the Waupun Correctional Institution.

== 1889 Reunion ==
In 1889, the remaining members of the 29th Wisconsin Infantry Regiment met for a reunion.

== See also ==
- List of Wisconsin Civil War units
- Wisconsin in the American Civil War

== Sources ==
- 29th Wisconsin Infantry History at the Wisconsin Historical Society
- The Civil War Archive
