= William C. Frazer =

American judge, Supreme Court Justice of the Wisconsin Territory

The Honorable William C. Frazer
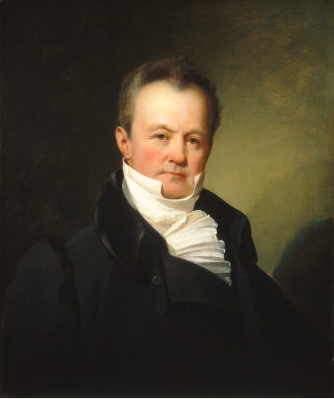
- portrait by Jacob Eichholtz, 1835

Justice of the Supreme Court of the Wisconsin Territory
- In office July 4, 1836 – October 18, 1838
- Appointed by: Andrew Jackson
- Preceded by: Position Established
- Succeeded by: Andrew G. Miller

Personal details
- Born: 1776 New Castle, Delaware Colony
- Died: October 18, 1836 (aged 59–60) Milwaukee, Wisconsin
- Resting place: Woodward Hill Cemetery; Lancaster, Pennsylvania
- Spouse: Susannah Carpenter (m. 1803; died 1836)
- Children: 4
- Education: Princeton University

William Clark Frazer (1776 – October 18, 1838) was an American lawyer and judge. He was a prominent lawyer in Lancaster, Pennsylvania, and was one of the first judges appointed to the Supreme Court of the Wisconsin Territory when it was established in 1836.

== Biography ==
He was born in New Castle, Delaware Colony. His father, also named William Clark, was a Captain of the Delaware light cavalry during the American Revolutionary War. He graduated from Princeton University in 1797 and read law in Lancaster, Pennsylvania, with former congressman William Montgomery. He was admitted to practice law in 1801 and established a practice in New Castle, Delaware, until relocating to Lancaster, Pennsylvania, in 1813.

Frazer gave a eulogy in the Masonic Lodge, in Lancaster, on the death of George Washington in 1799, and again at the deaths of John Adams and Thomas Jefferson in 1826.

In 1836, President Andrew Jackson appointed Frazer to the Supreme Court for the newly established Wisconsin Territory in the third district, which at the time was most of the eastern part of what is now the state of Wisconsin, but at the time was Brown and Milwaukee counties. Judge Frazer never fully relocated to Wisconsin, but held court at De Pere and Milwaukee on several occasions. As a judge, Frazer was quite unpopular. He was said to have fallen into "intemperate habits" that had impaired his mental and physical health, and his manner was described as nervous, impatient, arbitrary, harsh, overbearing, and offensive. A petition campaign was organized to seek Judge Frazer's resignation and, in September 1838, he wrote that he would retire in October. However, he changed his plans and set out for Milwaukee in October to hear cases again. He fell ill during the trip, however, and was carried ashore on October 18, 1838. He died later that day.

== Personal life and family ==
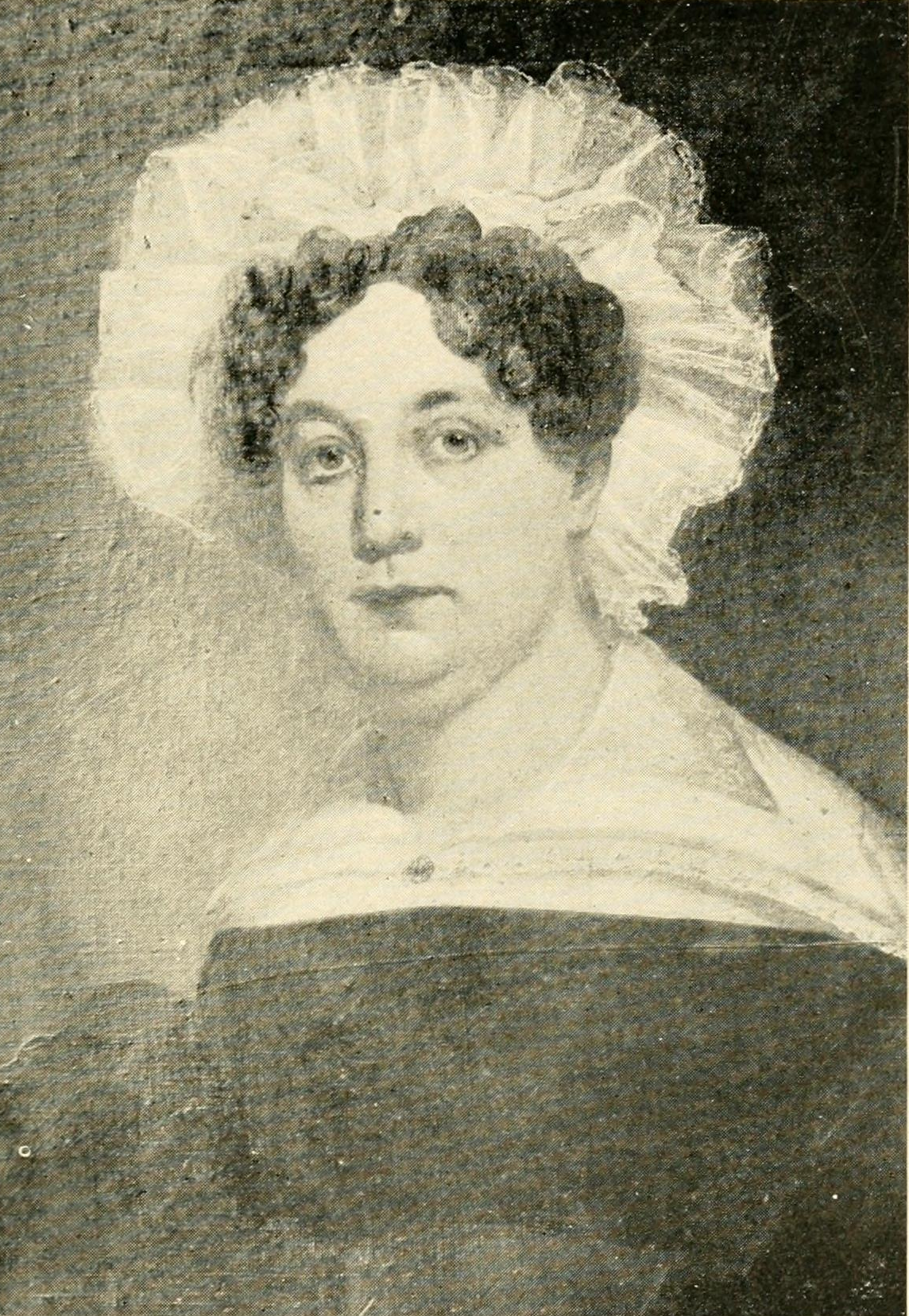
Mrs. Susan Carpenter Frazer, circa 1830

Frazer was married to Susannah Carpenter of Lancaster in 1803. They had at least four children:

- Reah was a prominent lawyer and leader of the Democratic party in Lancaster, Pennsylvania.
- Abraham was a medical doctor, but died at age 28.
- Mary married Reverend James P. Wilson, but died at age 24.
- William graduated from West Point and served with distinction in the Seminole Wars.
