= Charles R. Gill =

19th century American politician, Civil War Union officer

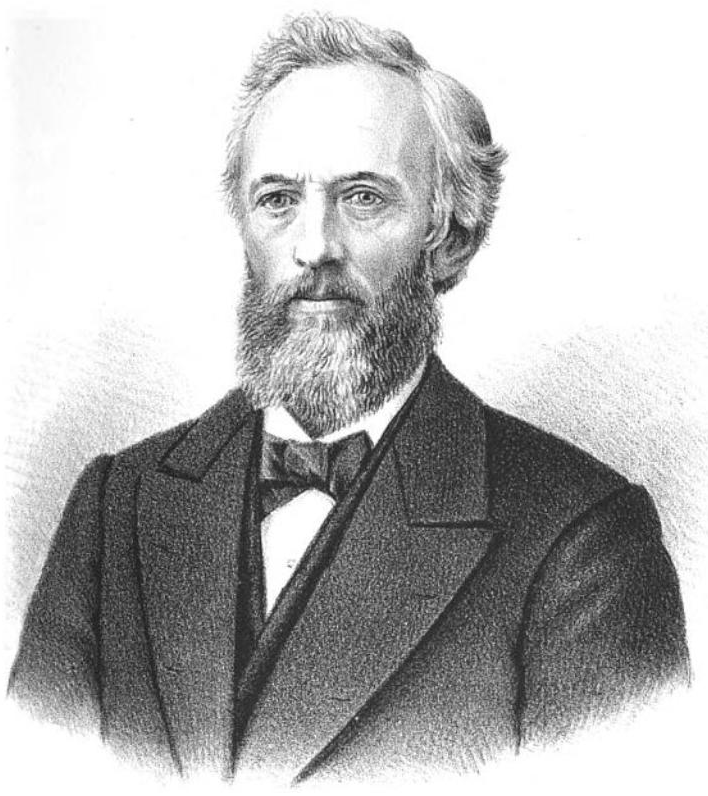

11th United States Commissioner of Pensions
- In office February 10, 1876 – March 28, 1876
- President: Ulysses S. Grant
- Preceded by: Henry M. Atkinson
- Succeeded by: John A. Bentley

9th Attorney General of Wisconsin
- In office January 1, 1866 – January 3, 1870
- Governor: Lucius Fairchild
- Preceded by: Winfield Smith
- Succeeded by: Stephen Steele Barlow

Member of the Wisconsin Senate from the 14th district
- In office January 2, 1860 – January 6, 1862
- Preceded by: William Chappell
- Succeeded by: Smith S. Wilkinson

Personal details
- Born: Charles Rice Gill; August 17, 1830 Winfield, New York
- Died: March 28, 1883 (aged 52) Dane County, Wisconsin
- Resting place: Forest Hill Cemetery; Madison, Wisconsin
- Party: Republican; Democratic (before 1859)
- Spouses: Martha Ada Lanckton; (m. 1854; died 1913)
- Children: Evelyn Louise (Ford)^{(b. 1856; died 1938)}; Eugene D. Gill^{(b. 1858; died 1858)}; Clark Lanckton Gill^{(b. 1861; died 1938)}; Ralph Cleveland Gill^{(b. 1864; died 1926)}; Hiram Charles Gill^{(b. 1866; died 1919)}; Alice Maria (Pickarts)^{(b. 1868; died 1932)}; Olive Eliza Gill^{(b. 1870)}; Martha Ada Gill^{(b. 1874)}
- Parents: David Gill (father); Nancy (Clark) Gill (mother)
- Profession: lawyer, politician

Military service
- Allegiance: United States
- Branch/service: United States Volunteers; Union Army
- Years of service: 1862–1865
- Rank: Colonel, USV
- Commands: 29th Reg. Wis. Vol. Infantry
- Battles/wars: American Civil War: Vicksburg Campaign; Battle of Port Gibson; Battle of Champion Hill; Siege of Vicksburg; Jackson Expedition

Charles Rice Gill (August 17, 1830 – March 28, 1883) was an American lawyer, politician, and Union Army officer in the American Civil War. He was the 9th Attorney General of Wisconsin and represented northern Jefferson County in the Wisconsin State Senate for the 1860 and 1861 sessions. He also briefly served as U.S. Commissioner of Pensions under President Ulysses S. Grant.

== Early life ==
Gill was born in Winfield, New York, to David and Nancy Gill. He grew up in Frankfort, New York. In 1843, his father moved the family to a farm in Genesee County and died a year later. Charles worked the farm while tending to his own education, and later taught school. After 1848, he entered the study of law at the office of Wakeman & Bryan in Batavia, New York. On September 4, 1854, he was admitted to the bar. A few days later, on September 17, he married Martha Lanckton. That October, they left New York and moved to Watertown, Wisconsin, where he immediately set up a law practice.

== Career in Wisconsin ==
After establishing his law practice, Gill became interested in local affairs. In 1856, he was the Democratic Party candidate for Jefferson County District Attorney, but was defeated. In 1858, he was their candidate for Wisconsin State Assembly, but was again defeated. Around the same time, he was appointed superintendent of Watertown's schools by the local school board. During his time in that role, in 1859, he came into conflict with the city council which was attempting to take more direct oversight of the school board and its affairs and finances. Gill had the support of the school board, but the majority of the city council was set against them. The city council charged him with defying their ordinances, but offered no proof or support for their charges. They voted to remove him from office on June 18, 1859. Gill challenged the ruling up to the Wisconsin Supreme Court, and, in the case State ex rel. Gill v Common Council of Watertown, the Court ruled that the council would be required to rescind his removal.

The school board affair and his case before the Supreme Court raised his reputation in the state, and later that year he was elected to the Wisconsin State Senate as an independent. Gill's political journey is somewhat indicative of the era. He began as a voter with the Democratic Party and saw himself as a Douglas-style democrat, opposing slavery but believing in a policy of federal non-interference. As the 1860 presidential election began to shape up as a contest between Abraham Lincoln and John C. Breckinridge, Gill ultimately chose to align with the Republicans.

As the secession crisis started, Senator Gill became recognized as a leader of the war party within the Senate. At the start of the 1861 session, he pushed for a committee to prioritize war preparations. His committee was approved by the senate and he was named chairman—one of the earliest war preparation measures taken by a Union state. He quickly reported a bill which provided for raising six regiments of infantry and two of artillery. When word came of the firing on Fort Sumter, the Legislature quickly passed his bill. A special session of the legislature was then held to further war preparations and Gill was again made chairman of the select committee for that purpose.

== Civil War ==
After the special session, upon hearing that his native Watertown had not provided a significant quantity of volunteers for the war effort, Gill took up a recruitment commission. In Watertown, he called a war meeting and brought together a large audience. As he addressed the gathered crowd to ask for volunteers, one person criticized Senator Gill for urging others to enlist when he was safe on a recruiting commission. In the middle of his speech, Gill tore up his commission and signed an enlistment for three years of service. With his example, he was quickly able to recruit the necessary volunteers to form a company, and they immediately elected him as their captain. Coming together with other Jefferson County volunteer companies, Gill was recommended for the command of a regiment. His companies were enrolled into the new 29th Wisconsin Volunteer Infantry Regiment, and Governor Alexander Randall commissioned Gill to be Colonel of the regiment.

The 29th Wisconsin mustered into service September 27, 1862, and marched out of Wisconsin for Cairo, Illinois, en route to Arkansas, in the Western Theater of the American Civil War. At Helena, Arkansas, they attached to the Army of the Tennessee under Ulysses S. Grant. That spring, they commenced the Vicksburg campaign.

Colonel Gill led his regiment through several battles of the Vicksburg campaign and earned the recognition of his colleagues. However, at the close of that campaign he was stricken by a serious illness that was so severe he was forced to return to Wisconsin to recuperate. His resignation occurred on July 9, 1863, in the midst of the Siege of Jackson.

== Postbellum years ==
After recovering from his illness, Gill returned to his law practice, and eventually return to public office. At the 1865 Union Republican State Convention, Gill was nominated by the party for Attorney General of Wisconsin on a ticket with fellow war veterans Lucius Fairchild for Governor and Thomas Allen for Secretary of State. Before taking his place on the ticket, Gill spoke out strenuously in opposition to the party platform offered by their own United States Senator, James Rood Doolittle. Doolittle's platform endorsed Andrew Johnson's reconstruction plans and opposed suffrage for African Americans. Gill did not prevail at the convention, as Doolittle's platform was adopted by the party. However, after the Republican victory in the 1865 election, the members of the new legislature quickly wrote a resolution demanding the resignation of Senator Doolittle, essentially vindicating Gill's criticisms. Gill was elected Attorney General in the 1865 general election and went on to re-election in 1867.

After leaving office in January 1870, he purchased a farm in Blooming Grove, Wisconsin, and moved his law practice to Madison. Under President Grant, Gill was appointed attorney for the U.S. government in the negotiations over the Fox and Wisconsin Rivers improvements. In 1876, Grant appointed him U.S. Commissioner of Pensions, but he was forced to resign after only a few weeks due to poor health—still troubled by the illness that had forced his resignation from the Army in 1863. The illness would continue to trouble him for the remainder of his life. He died at age 52 in 1883.

== Family and personal life ==
Charles Gill married Martha Lanckton September 17, 1854. Together they had eight children, with seven surviving to adulthood. Their son Hiram Gill would go on to become Mayor of Seattle, Washington, in the early part of the 20th century.

== See also ==
- List of attorneys general of Wisconsin

Military offices
Regiment established	Command of the 29th Wisconsin Infantry Regiment; September 27, 1862 – July 9, 1863	Succeeded by Lt. Col. William A. Greene
Party political offices
Preceded by Winfield Smith	Republican nominee for Attorney General of Wisconsin; 1865, 1867	Succeeded by Stephen Steele Barlow
Wisconsin Senate
Preceded by William Chappell	Member of the Wisconsin Senate from the 14th district January 2, 1860 – January 6, 1862	Succeeded by Smith S. Wilkinson
Government offices
Preceded by Henry M. Atkinson	United States Commissioner of Pensions; February 10, 1876 – March 28, 1876	Succeeded by John A. Bentley
Legal offices
Preceded by Winfield Smith	Attorney General of Wisconsin; January 1, 1866 – January 3, 1870	Succeeded by Stephen Steele Barlow
