= James H. Persons =

American politician (1829–1895)

Member of the Wisconsin State Assembly from the Pierce district
- In office January 6, 1873 – January 4, 1875
- Preceded by: Oliver S. Powell
- Succeeded by: Thomas L. Nelson

Personal details
- Born: July 13, 1829 Wales, New York, U.S.
- Died: March 24, 1895 (aged 65) Union, Pierce County, Wisconsin, U.S.
- Resting place: Poplar Hill Cemetery, Elmwood, Wisconsin
- Party: Republican
- Spouse: Maria Antonett Yendes (m. 1854–1895)
- Children: Sarah A. Persons^{(b. 1858; died 1864)}; Minnie E. (Miller)^{(b. 1862; died 1934)}; Elwin D. Persons^{(b. 1865; died 1928)}; Fred James Persons^{(b. 1868; died 1930)}
- Relatives: Enos Warren Persons (2nd cousin)
- Occupation: Farmer

Military service
- Allegiance: United States
- Branch/service: United States Volunteers; Union Army
- Years of service: 1862–1865
- Rank: Sergeant, USV
- Unit: 29th Reg. Wis. Vol. Infantry
- Battles/wars: American Civil War: Vicksburg Campaign; Red River Campaign

James H. Persons (July 13, 1829 – March 24, 1895) was an American farmer, Republican politician, and Wisconsin pioneer. He was a member of the Wisconsin State Assembly, representing Pierce County during the 1873 and 1874 sessions.

== Early life ==
James H. Persons was born in Wales, New York, in July 1829. He was raised and educated in New York, but came west to the Wisconsin Territory with his family in 1846. They settled in the town of Rubicon, in Dodge County.

== Civil War service ==
After the start of the American Civil War, Persons volunteered for service in the Union Army, along with his half-brother, Francis. They were enlisted in Company I of the 29th Wisconsin Infantry Regiment, and went south with their regiment to Arkansas for service in the western theater of the war in September 1862.

Through the Winter of 1862–1863, they engaged in several operations along the Mississippi River in support of the Vicksburg Campaign, and during those months, Persons was promoted to corporal and then sergeant. In May 1863, they assaulted the enemy defenses at the Battle of Champion Hill, east of Vicksburg. In the battle, Francis Persons was killed and James was taken prisoner. He was ultimately able to return to the regiment and continued to serve through the rest of the war, participating in the Red River campaign into Louisiana. He mustered out with the regiment in June 1865.

== Political career ==
Persons returned to Wisconsin, and, in 1868, he moved to a farm in Pierce County, Wisconsin. In Pierce County, he was active in the Republican Party of Wisconsin and was elected to the county board of supervisors, serving as chairman in 1872. Running on the Republican ticket, he was elected to two consecutive terms in the Wisconsin State Assembly, in 1872 and 1873.

== Personal life and family ==
James H. Persons was one of at least four children born to Joseph Persons Sr., and his first wife, Betsy (née Farwell). James Persons had a twin brother, Joseph Persons Jr. Other members of the extended Persons family also came to Wisconsin—Enos Warren Persons, who served in the State Senate and Assembly in the 1880s, was a second cousin.

James H. Persons married Maria Antonett Yendes of Sackets Harbor, New York, in 1854. They had at least four children together, though one daughter died young.

James H. Persons died at his home in the town of Union, Pierce County, Wisconsin, on March 24, 1895.

== Electoral history ==
=== Wisconsin Assembly (1872, 1873) ===
Wisconsin Assembly, Pierce District Election, 1872
| Party | Candidate | Votes | % | ±% |
|---|---|---|---|---|
General Election, November 5, 1872
| Republican | James H. Persons | 1,260 | 59.24% | −5.80% |
| Reform | N. P. Stone | 624 | 29.34% | −5.62% |
| Bourbon Democrat | Joel Foster | 243 | 11.42% | |
| Plurality | | 636 | 29.90% | -0.18% |
| Total votes | | 2,127 | 100.0% | +22.10% |
| Republican hold | | | | |

Wisconsin Assembly, Pierce District Election, 1873
| Party | Candidate | Votes | % | ±% |
|---|---|---|---|---|
General Election, November 4, 1873
| Republican | James H. Persons (incumbent) | 1,429 | 100.0% | |
| Total votes | | 1,429 | 100.0% | -32.82% |
| Republican hold | | | | |

Wisconsin State Assembly
| Preceded by Oliver S. Powell | Member of the Wisconsin State Assembly from the Pierce district January 6, 1873 – January 4, 1875 | Succeeded by Thomas L. Nelson |
