= Eugene Fitch Ware =

American soldier, lawyer, politician, and writer (1841–1911)

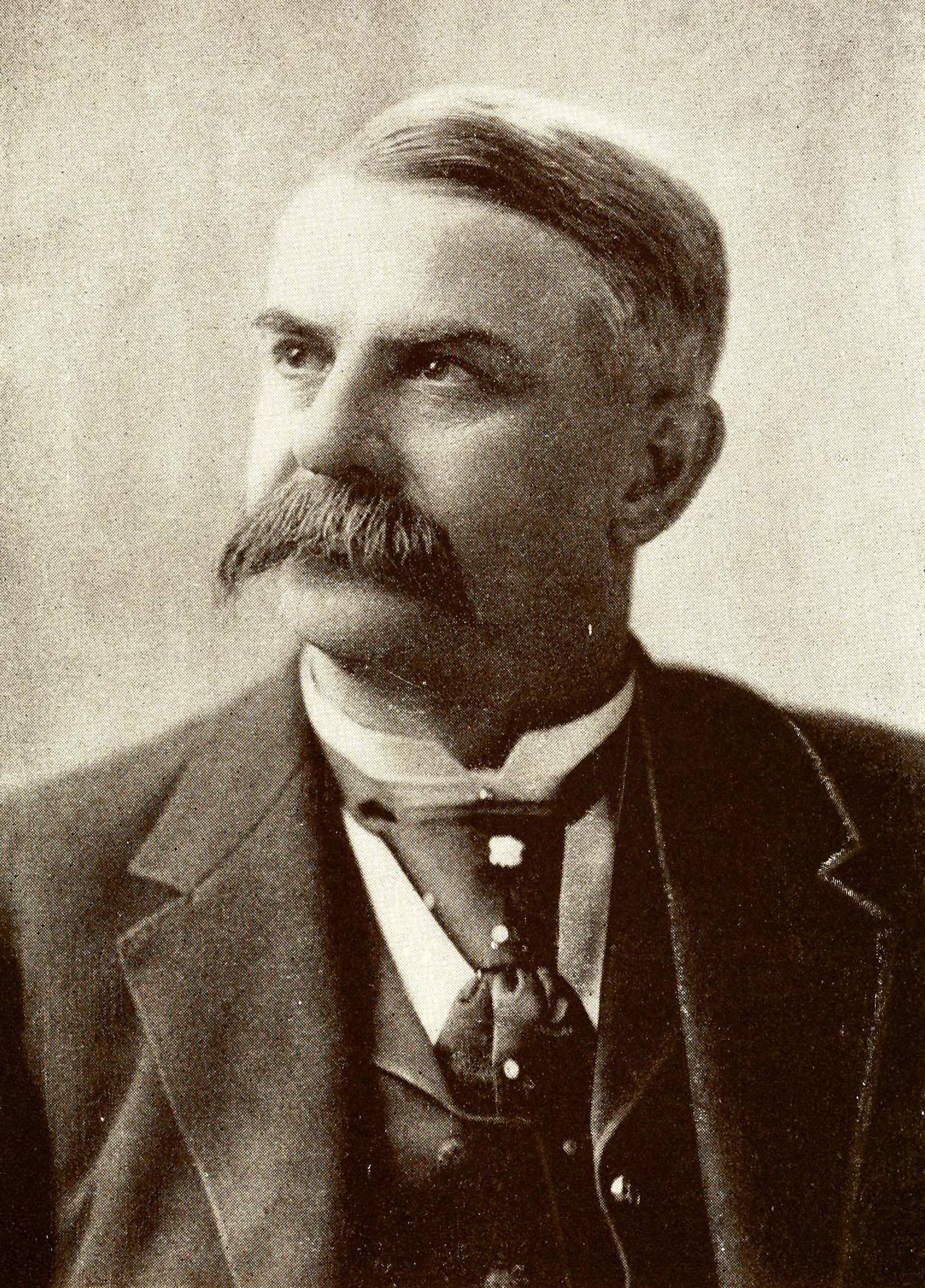
- Born: May 29, 1841; Hartford
- Died: July 1, 1911; Cascade
- Political party: Republican Party

Eugene Fitch Ware (May 29, 1841 – July 1, 1911), sometimes publishing pseudonymously as Ironquill, was an American soldier, lawyer, politician, and writer.

== Early life ==
Eugene Fitch Ware was born on May 29, 1841, in Hartford, Connecticut. His family moved to Burlington, Iowa, when he was young.

== Military career ==
Ware enlisted in the First Iowa Volunteer Infantry in April 1861 as part of the Union Army in the American Civil War. After completing his term of service with that regiment, he re-enlisted in the Fourth Iowa Cavalry. In September 1863, he was commissioned a lieutenant in the 7th Iowa Cavalry Regiment. Ware was with General Patrick Edward Connor on the Powder River Expedition. After the Powder River campaign, he was promoted to captain. After coming to the frontier, he was detailed for staff duty by General Robert Byington Mitchell. Later, General Connor asked him to serve on his staff, which Ware wanted to do, but General Mitchell objected to his leaving, and he was therefore unable to join Connor.

== Writing ==
After the Civil War, Ware moved back to Burlington, Iowa, where he briefly edited the Burlington Hawkeye, a local paper. He moved to Kansas in May 1867, taking up a substantial acreage in Cherokee County. He moved to Fort Scott, Kansas, in September 1870 after receiving a job offer at the Fort Scott Monitor. In 1872, Ware became editor of the Monitor. In 1874, he began publishing poems under the pseudonym "Ironquill". His "The Washerwoman's Song", first published in 1876, was widely popular.

== Politics and law ==
Ware served in the Kansas Senate from 1879 to 1885. He also worked as a lawyer in Topeka, Kansas. A Republican, Ware was twice selected as a delegate for the Republican National Convention. President Theodore Roosevelt named Ware as United States Commissioner of Pensions on April 11, 1902. He left the post in 1904.

He died on July 1, 1911, while on vacation in Cascade, Colorado.

== Sources ==
- Dary, David (1987). More true tales of old-time Kansas. University Press of Kansas. ISBN 0-7006-0331-X. OCLC 15317862.
