= John A. Bentley =

American politician and lawyer (1836–1912)

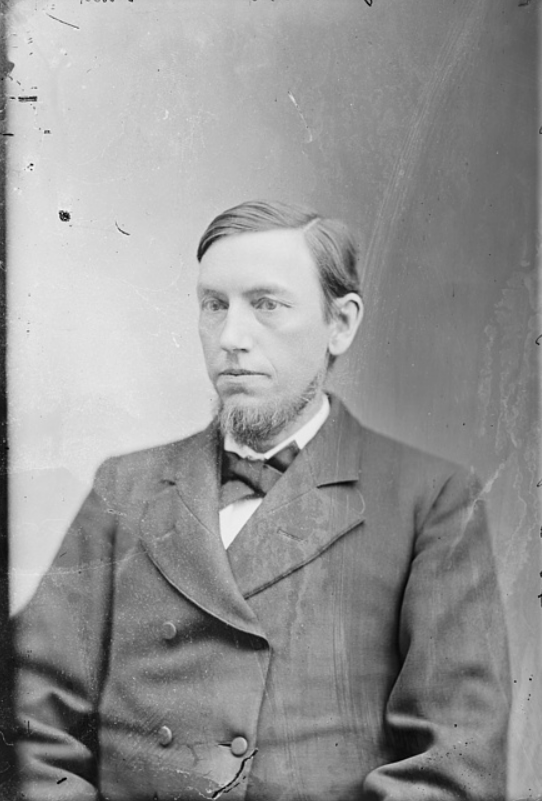
- Bentley, 1865–1880

12th United States Commissioner of Pensions
- In office March 28, 1876 – June 27, 1881
- President: Ulysses S. Grant; Rutherford B. Hayes
- Preceded by: Charles R. Gill
- Succeeded by: William Wade Dudley

Member of the Wisconsin Senate from the 1st district
- In office January 1, 1865 – January 1, 1867
- Preceded by: John E. Thomas
- Succeeded by: Van Eps Young

Personal details
- Born: January 27, 1836 Kingsbury, New York, U.S.
- Died: May 4, 1912 (aged 76) King County, Washington, U.S.
- Resting place: Glens Falls Cemetery; Glens Falls, New York
- Party: Republican
- Spouse: Isabella J. Peat (m. 1861–1912)
- Children: William Richard Bentley^{(b. 1867; died 1941)}
- Parents: Cornelius Bentley (father); Mary (Brayton) Bentley (mother)
- Education: Albany Law School
- Profession: lawyer, politician

John Asa Bentley (January 27, 1836 – May 4, 1912) was an American lawyer and Republican politician. He was United States Commissioner of Pensions under the last year of Ulysses S. Grant's presidency and through the presidency of Rutherford B. Hayes. He also served as a member of the Wisconsin State Senate in 1865 and 1866.

== Biography ==
Bentley was born in Kingsbury, New York, to Cornelius and Mary Brayton Bentley. As a boy, he worked on his father's farm and attended public schools in the vicinity. He studied law under Judge Enoch H. Rosekrans, of the New York Supreme Court, and Orange Ferriss, who would later serve in Congress. He graduated from Albany Law School in 1857 and was admitted to the New York State Bar Association. He established a legal practice in Glens Falls, New York, where he remained until 1859.

In March 1859, he traveled to the state of Wisconsin, first establishing himself at Manitowoc, then moving to Sheboygan. In 1864, he was elected to represent Sheboygan County in the Wisconsin State Senate on the National Union ticket. He left the senate after a single two-year term and became President of the Sheboygan and Fond du Lac Railroad.

In 1876, he was appointed by President Ulysses S. Grant to be United States Commissioner of Pensions after the brief term and resignation of fellow Wisconsinite Charles R. Gill. Bentley went on to serve through the remainder of Grant's term and through the four years of the presidency of Rutherford B. Hayes, relinquishing his office when a successor was appointed by President James A. Garfield.

After leaving office, he moved to Denver, Colorado, and restarted his legal practice.

== Family and personal life ==
On September 5, 1861, Bentley married Isabella J. Peat (1837–1917). They had one son, William R. Bentley (1867–1941). The family grave is in Glens Falls, New York.
