= Jennie Florella Holmes =

American temperance activist and suffragist (1842–1892)

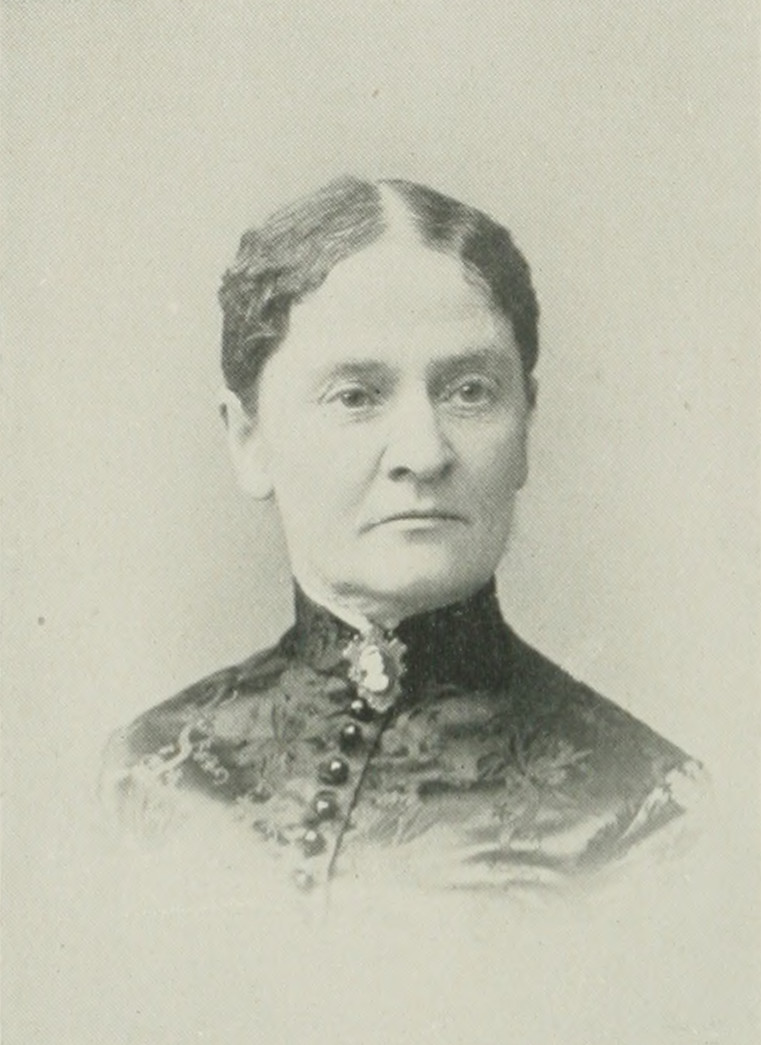
- Photo portrait from "A Woman of the Century"
- Born: Jennie Florella Hurd; February 26, 1842; Jersey County, Illinois, U.S.
- Died: March 20, 1892 (aged 50); Tecumseh, Nebraska, U.S.
- Education: Lombard College
- Occupations: temperance activist; suffragist
- Known for: Chair, Executive Committee, Nebraska State Suffrage Society; President, Nebraska State Woman's Christian Temperance Union
- Spouse: Charles A. Holmes (m. 1866)

Jennie Florella Holmes (née, Hurd; February 26, 1842 – March 20, 1892) was an American temperance activist and suffragist. She served as Chair of the Executive Committee of the Nebraska State Suffrage Society and President of the Nebraska State Woman's Christian Temperance Union (WCTU).

== Early life and education ==
Jennie Florella Hurd was born on February 26, 1842, on a farm in Jersey County, Illinois, where she spent her early years.

In 1859, she entered Lombard College, Galesburg, Illinois, where she continued her studies until 1861, when the pressing demand for teachers, created by the Civil War led her to take up that calling. At the same time, she undertook her full share of the war activities devolving upon the women of that period. Being a staunch Unionist, she gave service to the Soldiers' Aid Society of Jerseyville, Illinois.

== Career ==
In 1866, she married Charles A. Holmes, of Jefferson, Wisconsin, who had served three years as captain in the 29th Wisconsin Infantry Regiment. With her husband and two daughters, she moved to Tecumseh, Nebraska, in September, 1871 where she had six more children.

Holmes, an advocate of temperance and equal political rights for both sexes, allied herself with these movements in Nebraska. In the winter of 1881, she became a member of the first woman's suffrage convention held in the state, and worked for the amendment submitted at that session of the legislature. She was Chair of the executive committee of the State Suffrage Society from 1881 to 1884.

In 1884, she was elected President of the Nebraska State WCTU, an office she held for three years. She was elected delegate-at-large from Nebraska to the National Prohibition Party Convention, held in Indianapolis in 1888. In her ardent love for the cause, she considered this the greatest honor of her life.

She was active in the Woman's Relief Corps, and a delegate to the Woman's Relief Corps convention held in Milwaukee in 1889. Being attentive to educational needs in her own city as well as abroad, she was elected to the school board in 1891.

== Death ==
She died in her home in Tecumseh, Nebraska, March 20, 1892.
