= 32nd Wisconsin Infantry Regiment =

Union Army infantry regiment

- Flag of Wisconsin
- Active: December 24, 1862 – July 8, 1865
- Country: United States
- Allegiance: Union
- Branch: Infantry
- Size: Regiment
- Engagements: American Civil War: Vicksburg Campaign; Meridian Campaign; Atlanta campaign; Battle of Atlanta; Battle of Jonesborough; Savannah Campaign; Carolinas campaign; Battle of Rivers' Bridge; Battle of Bentonville

Commanders
- Colonel: James Henry Howe
- Colonel: Charles Henry De Groat

The 32nd Wisconsin Infantry Regiment was a volunteer infantry regiment that served in the Union Army during the American Civil War.

== Service ==
The 32nd Wisconsin Infantry was organized at Camp Bragg in Oshkosh, Wisconsin, and mustered into service on September 25, 1862. The regiment left Wisconsin for Memphis, Tennessee, on October 30 and moved through Mississippi, Alabama, Georgia, the Carolinas, Virginia and Washington D.C.

It participated in the Siege of Atlanta, Sherman's March to the Sea, the Battle of Bentonville and the surrender of the Confederate army.

== Casualties ==
The 32nd Wisconsin suffered 1 officer and 26 enlisted men killed in action or who later died of their wounds, plus another 3 officers and 86 enlisted men who died of disease, for a total of 112 fatalities.

== Commanders ==
- Colonel James Henry Howe (September 25, 1862 – July 6, 1864) resigned. After the war was appointed United States district judge for the Eastern District of Wisconsin
- Colonel Charles Henry De Groat (July 6, 1864 – July 8, 1865) mustered out with the regiment and received an honorary brevet to brigadier general.

== Notable members ==
- William A. Bugh was commissioned lieutenant colonel of the regiment but could never join due to injuries previously received while serving as captain of Co. G in the 5th Wisconsin Infantry Regiment. After the war he became a Wisconsin state legislator.
- George Caldwell was a private in Co. D. He transferred to the 16th Wisconsin Infantry Regiment in 1865. After the war he became a Wisconsin state legislator.
- Samuel Abbott Ferrin was a hospital steward. He later served as an assistant surgeon in the 44th Wisconsin Infantry Regiment. After the war he became a Wisconsin state legislator.
- Simon Lord was surgeon of the regiment. Previously served as assistant surgeon in the 13th Wisconsin Infantry Regiment. After the war he became a Wisconsin state senator.
- Henry Markham was second lieutenant of Co. G and was wounded at Rivers' Bridge. After the war he became the 18th governor of California and a U.S. congressman.
- David G. Williams was enlisted in Co. F and rose to the rank of sergeant. After the war he became a Wisconsin state legislator.

== See also ==
- Addie L. Ballou
- List of Wisconsin Civil War units
- Wisconsin in the American Civil War
