= Matthew Keenan =

American politician (1825–1898)

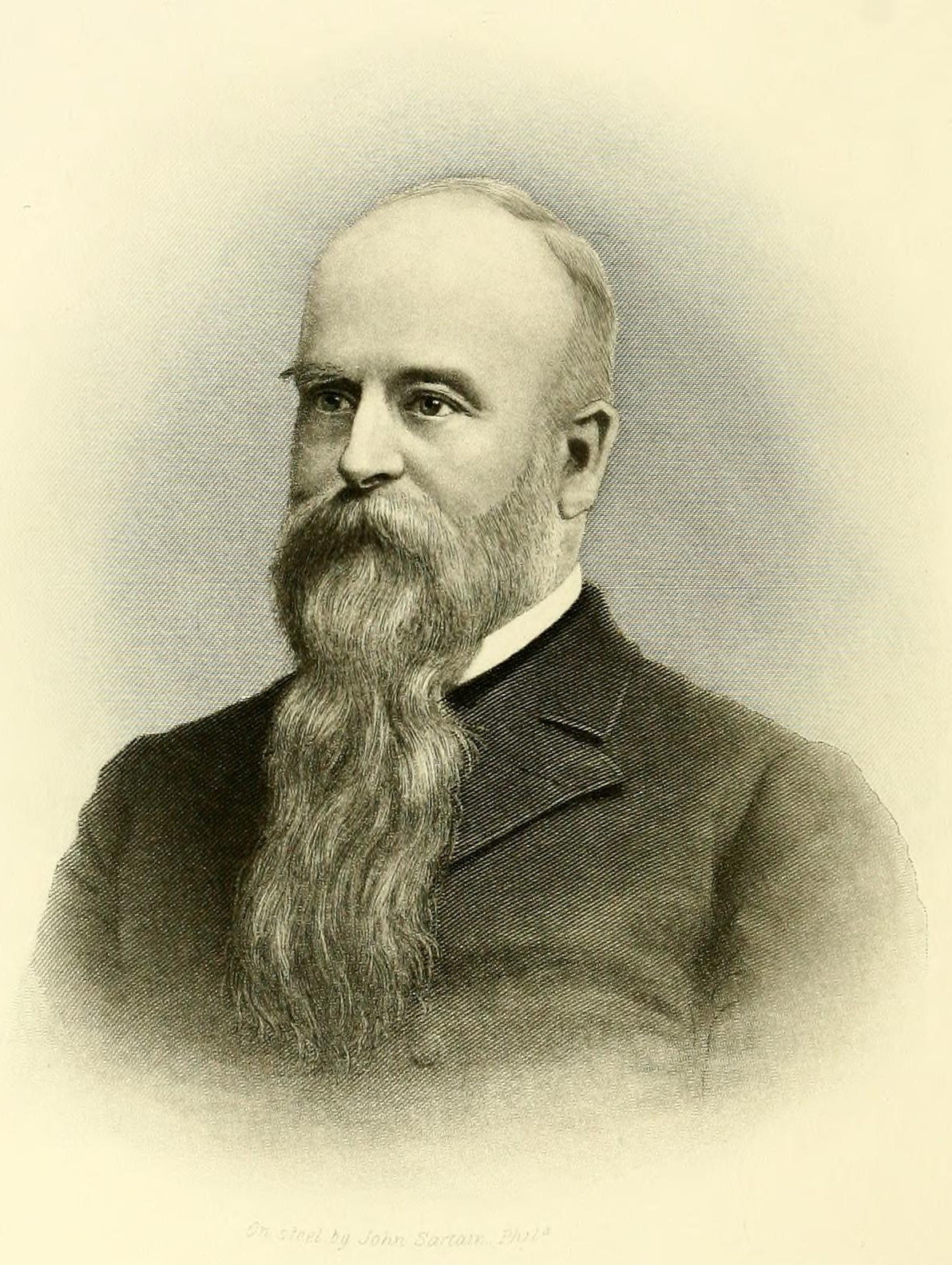
- From History of Milwaukee from its first settlement to the year 1895 (1895)

Member of the Wisconsin State Assembly from the Milwaukee 7th district
- In office January 2, 1871 – January 1, 1872
- Preceded by: Daniel Harris Johnson
- Succeeded by: Winfield Smith

Personal details
- Born: January 5, 1825 Manlius, New York, U.S.
- Died: August 20, 1898 (aged 73) Milwaukee, Wisconsin, U.S.
- Cause of death: Stroke
- Resting place: Calvary Cemetery, Milwaukee
- Party: Democratic

Matthew Keenan (January 5, 1825 – August 20, 1898) was an American businessman, politician, and Wisconsin pioneer. He was a member of the Wisconsin State Assembly, representing the lower east side of the city of Milwaukee during the 1871 session.

== Biography ==
Keenan was born in Manlius, New York, in January 1825. He received his early education in New York, but came west to the Wisconsin Territory with his parents in 1837. They arrived in Milwaukee when it was just a collection of three small settlements. When he was sixteen, both his parents died, and he went to work to support himself as a clerk in the general merchandise store of William Brown, Jr. After a few years, he and a partner purchased the store, operating it afterwards as Hayden & Keenan.

He was elected clerk of the Wisconsin circuit court for Milwaukee County in the fall of 1852, and was subsequently re-elected three times, serving until January 1861. He served six years as Milwaukee tax commissioner through the 1860s, and was elected to the city council from Milwaukee's seventh ward in 1869. In 1870, he was elected to the Wisconsin State Assembly running on the Democratic Party ticket. He represented Milwaukee County's 7th Assembly district, which at that time was identical to his previous city council district, covering what's known as the lower east side of the city.

His chief accomplishment in the Legislature was the passage of the law to enable Milwaukee to construct a waterworks (1871 Wisc. Act 475). Keenan was selected as secretary of the new city water commission and superintendent of the waterworks. He remained in that role until the construction was finished and the works were operational. The North Point Water Tower constructed in this project is now listed in the National Register of Historic Places.

After completing his duty to the waterworks, Keenan resigned to take a role as an officer of the Northwestern Mutual Life Insurance Company. He rose quickly, serving several years as superintendent of the company's agencies, then as head of their real estate department. In 1876, he was made a vice president of the company, where he remained until his retirement in 1894.

In addition to his corporate and political roles, Keenan served in several civic groups. He was vice president of the Milwaukee Chamber of Commerce, delegate to the National Board of Trade, regent of the University of Wisconsin, and trustee of the Milwaukee Public Library.

Keenan died of a stroke at his home in Milwaukee, on August 20, 1898, and was then buried at Milwaukee's historic Calvary Cemetery.

== Electoral history ==
=== Wisconsin Assembly (1870) ===
Wisconsin Assembly, Milwaukee 7th District Election, 1870
Party	Candidate	Votes	%	±%
General Election, November 8, 1870
Democratic	Matthew Keenan	639	61.21%	+25.24%
Republican	William A. Prentiss	405	38.79%	−8.78%
Plurality		234	22.41%	+10.80%
Total votes		1,044	100.0%	+17.70%
Democratic gain from Republican				

Wisconsin State Assembly
Preceded by Daniel Harris Johnson	Member of the Wisconsin State Assembly from the Milwaukee 7th district January 2, 1871 – January 1, 1872	Succeeded by Winfield Smith
