= James Henry Howe =

19th century American lawyer and federal judge

The Honorable James Henry Howe

United States District Judge for the Eastern District of Wisconsin
- In office December 11, 1873 – January 1, 1875
- Appointed by: Ulysses S. Grant
- Preceded by: Andrew G. Miller
- Succeeded by: Charles E. Dyer

7th Attorney General of Wisconsin
- In office January 2, 1860 – October 7, 1862
- Governor: Alexander Randall; Louis P. Harvey; Edward Salomon
- Preceded by: Gabriel Bouck
- Succeeded by: Winfield Smith

Personal details
- Born: December 5, 1827 Turner, Maine, U.S.
- Died: January 4, 1893 (aged 65) Boston, Massachusetts, U.S.
- Resting place: Green Ridge Cemetery, Kenosha, Wisconsin
- Party: Republican
- Spouse: Mary G. Cotton (m. 1857; died 1887)
- Children: James Torrey Howe^{(b. 1859; died 1934)}; William Torrey Howe^{(b. 1865; died 1897)}; Bessie
- Parents: Addison G. Howe (father); Mary (Torrey) Howe (mother)
- Relatives: Timothy O. Howe (uncle)
- Education: read law
- Profession: Lawyer, judge

Military service
- Allegiance: United States
- Branch/service: United States Volunteers; Union Army
- Years of service: 1862–1864
- Rank: Colonel, USV
- Commands: 32nd Reg. Wis. Vol. Infantry
- Battles/wars: American Civil War: Meridian campaign; Atlanta campaign

James Henry Howe (December 5, 1827 – January 4, 1893) was an American lawyer and Republican politician. He served one year as United States district judge for the Eastern District of Wisconsin, appointed by President Ulysses S. Grant. Earlier in his career, he was the 7th Attorney General of Wisconsin and served as a Union Army colonel in the American Civil War. He was Solicitor and General Manager for the Chicago and Northwestern R.R. and later solicitor for the Chicago, St. Paul and Omaha R.R. He was a nephew of U.S. Senator Timothy O. Howe, and was said to be "like a son" to him.

== Education and early career ==
Born on December 5, 1827, in Turner, Maine, Howe received a general education and proceeded to read law, first with Bradley & Eastman in Saco, Maine, then with his uncle, Timothy O. Howe, at Green Bay, Wisconsin Territory. He was admitted to the bar at Green Bay in 1848. He began practicing law in partnership with his uncle, but the partnership was terminated when the elder Howe was elevated to a Wisconsin circuit court judgeship in 1851. James Howe went on to partner with William H. Norris until 1860.

He was elected Attorney General of Wisconsin in 1859 and was the first Republican to hold that office. He was re-elected in 1861, but resigned office in October 1862 to volunteer with the Union Army for service in the American Civil War. During his second term as Attorney General, Howe led the state delegation to recover the body of Governor Louis P. Harvey, who had drowned while on a visit to the wounded soldiers from the Battle of Shiloh.

== Civil War service ==
Howe was commissioned as a colonel and placed in command of the 32nd Wisconsin Infantry Regiment, which was being organized at Camp Bragg in Oshkosh, Wisconsin. The regiment departed Wisconsin on October 30 and marched to Chicago, they then traveled by river to Memphis, Tennessee, via Cairo, Illinois. They reached Memphis on November 3, 1862, and were attached to General William Tecumseh Sherman's XV Corps.

They marched out with Sherman's Corps on maneuvers toward Jackson, Mississippi, in support of General Ulysses S. Grant's movement against Vicksburg, Mississippi. They stopped at the Union supply depot in Holly Springs, Mississippi, and were en route to Oxford, Mississippi, when a messenger reached them of the Confederate raid on Holly Springs. The 32nd Wisconsin was the first regiment to reach Holly Springs after the raid, and immediately proceeded on a forced march toward Grand Junction, Tennessee, which was also under threat. After arriving at Grand Junction, they were ordered to pursue Nathan Bedford Forrest. They ultimately returned to Memphis on February 2, 1863, and quartered there on provost duty through most of 1863, with an eye toward deterring Forrest, who was still attempting raids in the area.

Near the end of January 1864, the 32nd Wisconsin headed down the Mississippi River from Memphis to Vicksburg. There, they were attached to the 2nd Brigade, 4th Division, XVI Corps. By seniority, Colonel Howe was placed in command of the brigade. They then set out on the Meridian campaign. After routing the rebels at Jackson, they proceeded to Meridian, Mississippi, and occupied the city.

On March 11, 1864, the 32nd Wisconsin, along with XVI Corps, returned to Cairo on maneuvers to link up with General Grant on his operations in northern Alabama and Georgia. At Cairo, the 32nd, along with other regiments, was diverted to Union City, Tennessee, to again deal with a raid by Nathan Bedford Forrest. En route to the city however, they received word that they were too late and the defenders had surrendered. They then proceeded to Paducah, Kentucky, where it was believed Forrest would next attack, but, again, were unable to lure the Confederates into battle.

After another series of maneuvers attempting to trap Forrest, they again abandoned the chase and proceeded south into Alabama. They arrived at Decatur, Alabama, on April 10, where their brigade was renumbered to the 3rd Brigade, 4th Division, with Colonel Howe remaining in command. On May 27, the Brigade marched west and skirmished with elements of General Phillip Roddey's brigade. Roddey refused to give battle and retreated to the west. They remained on picket duty for the next month.

On July 6, 1864, Colonel Howe resigned his commission and set out to return to Wisconsin.

== Railroad service ==
After the war Howe was General Counsel [Solicitor] for the Chicago & North Western Rwy. beginning in 1864, and General Manager in 1872-73. By 1875-1878 he was a Director of that road, this after an appointment to the federal court by President Grant. He moved to Kenosha and from 1876 to 1892 was Solicitor for the Chicago, St. Paul and Omaha Railway Co.

== Federal judicial service ==
Howe was nominated by President Ulysses S. Grant on December 9, 1873, to a seat on the United States District Court for the Eastern District of Wisconsin vacated by Judge Andrew G. Miller. He was confirmed by the United States Senate on December 11, 1873, and received his commission the same day. He did not enjoy judicial duties and resigned after only a year of service, on January 1, 1875.

== Later career and death ==
Following his resignation from the federal bench and railroad work, Howe served for a time on the board of the J. L. Perry Manufacturing Company. During a bitter fight among the state Republican Party over the United States Senate election in 1878-1879, with Howe's uncle Senator Timothy Howe facing a difficult re-election, several Republican officials floated the compromise of replacing Timothy Howe with James Howe, but the idea never came to fruition and Howe was instead replaced by Matthew H. Carpenter.

Judge Howe hosted his uncle's funeral in 1883. After his uncle's death, an effort was made by Wisconsin's senators, Angus Cameron and Philetus Sawyer, to have James Howe appointed as his replacement as United States Postmaster General, but the effort was unsuccessful.

He died on January 4, 1893, in Boston, Massachusetts, after a period of incapacitation.

== Family ==
Howe was the nephew of U.S. Senator and U.S. Postmaster General Timothy O. Howe, and was said to be "like a son" to him.

Howe married Ms. Mary G. Cotton in 1857. They had at least three children.

== Electoral history ==
=== Wisconsin Attorney General (1859, 1861) ===
Wisconsin Attorney General Election, 1859
Party	Candidate	Votes	%	±%
General Election, November 8, 1859
Republican	James Henry Howe	60,569	53.71%	
Democratic	Samuel Crawford	52,209	46.29%	−3.93%
Plurality		8,360	7.41%	+6.96%
Total votes		112,778	100.0%	+26.54%
Republican gain from Democratic		Swing	7.86%	

Wisconsin Attorney General Election, 1861
Party	Candidate	Votes	%	±%
General Election, November 5, 1861
Republican	James Henry Howe (incumbent)	55,367	55.86%	+2.16%
Democratic	Philo A. Orton	43,647	44.04%	−2.26%
	Scattering	97	0.10%	
Plurality		11,720	11.83%	+4.41%
Total votes		99,111	100.0%	-12.12%
Republican hold				

Military offices
Regiment created	Command of the 32nd Wisconsin Infantry Regiment; September 25, 1862 – July 6, 1864	Succeeded by Col. Charles Henry De Groat
Party political offices
Preceded by Mortimer M. Jackson	Republican nominee for Attorney General of Wisconsin; 1859, 1861	Succeeded by Winfield Smith
Legal offices
Preceded by Gabriel Bouck	Attorney General of Wisconsin; 1860 – 1862	Succeeded by Winfield Smith
Preceded by Andrew G. Miller	United States District Judge for the Eastern District of Wisconsin; 1873 – 1875	Succeeded by Charles E. Dyer
