= Bureau of Pensions =

Agency of the federal government of the United States

The Bureau of Pensions was an agency of the federal government of the United States which existed from 1832 to 1930. It originally administered pensions solely for military personnel. Pension duties were transferred to the United States Department of the Interior in 1849. The death of many pensioners in the early 1900s greatly reduced the agency's workload. The agency closed in 1930 when its duties were transferred to the Veterans Administration.

== History ==
The first government pensions in American history were awarded to naval officers in 1799. Naval pensions were administered by a commission composed of the secretary of war, secretary of the navy, and secretary of the treasury from 1799 to 1832. The commission dissolved in 1832, and the Secretary of the Navy administered the pension plan alone until 1840. In 1828, Congress enacted legislation granting pensions to all remaining American Revolutionary War veterans. These pensions were administered by the secretary of the treasury. In 1833, Congress created a "commissioner of pensions" within the War Department and transferred the Treasury's pension function to this new office.

Congress created the Department of the Interior in 1849 and transferred the commissioner of pensions office to it. Renamed the Bureau of Pensions, the agency had two duties: Assess and either approve or deny claims, and to pay benefits. The office moved into the new Patent Office Building, where it stayed for 38 years. The massive increase in pension processing required by the Civil War led to the construction of a massive, new Pension Bureau Building. The Bureau of Pensions moved into this structure in 1887.

Political support came from the Republican Party, and the largest veterans' organization, the Grand Army of the Republic. In 1896, pensions accounted for 40% of all federal spending as the Bureau of Pensions provided monthly funds that averaged $12 to 750,000 veterans, and 222,000 dependents, especially widows. The money reached 63% of all surviving Union veterans.

With the death of many Civil War veterans beginning in the early 1900s (more than 500,000 had died between 1900 and 1920, requiring a 50 percent reduction in bureau staff), the Bureau of Pensions no longer needed the vast space of the Pension Bureau Building. The agency moved into the Interior Building in early 1926.

On July 21, 1930, President Herbert Hoover signed an executive order merging the Bureau of Pensions, Veterans' Bureau, and Home for Disabled Volunteer Soldiers into a single Veterans Administration. This ended the Bureau of Pensions' existence as a federal agency.

== Commissioners of Pensions ==
Image	Name	Start	End
	James L. Edwards	1833	1850
	James E. Heath	1850	1853
	Loren P. Waldo	1853	1855
	Josiah Minot	1855	1857
	George C. Whiting	1857	1861
	Joseph H. Barrett	1861	1868
	Christopher C. Cox	1868	1869
	Henry Van Aernam	1869	1871
	James H. Baker	1871	1875
	Henry M. Atkinson	1875	1876
	Charles R. Gill	1876	1876
	John A. Bentley	1876	1881
	William Wade Dudley	1881	1884
	Otis P. G. Clarke	1884	1885
	John C. Black	1885	1889
	James R. Tanner	1889	1889
	Green B. Raum	1889	1893
	William Lochren	1893	1896
	H. Clay Evans	1897	1902
	Eugene Fitch Ware	1902	1904
	Vespasian Warner	1905	1909
	James L. Davenport	1909	1912
	Gaylord M. Saltzgaber	1913	1920
	Washington Gardner	1921	1925
	Wilder Metcalf	1925	1925
	Winfield Scott	1925	1929
	Earl D. Church	1929	1930

== See also ==
- United States v. Germaine

== Bibliography ==
- Cimbala, Paul and Miller, Randall. Union Soldiers and the Northern Home Front: Wartime Experiences, Postwar Adjustments. New York: Fordham University Press, 2002.
- Cumberbatch, Rudolph. Failure Masquerading as Success: The Veterans Healthcare System: A Microcosm of the Current Federal Government. Bloomington, Ind.: AuthorHouse, 2008.
- Moeller, Gerard Martin and Feldblyum, Boris. AIA Guide to the Architecture of Washington, D.C. Baltimore, Md.: Johns Hopkins University Press, 2012.
- National Archives and Records Administration. Guide to the National Archives of the United States. Washington, D.C.: National Archives and Records Administration, 1987.
- National Park Service. Report of the Director of the National Park Service to the Secretary of the Interior for the Fiscal Year Ended June 30, 1924. United States Department of the Interior. Washington, D.C.: Government Printing Office, 1924.
- Secretary of the Interior. Annual Report of the Department of the Interior for the Fiscal Year Ended June 30, 1926. United States Department of the Interior. Washington, D.C.: Government Printing Office, 1926.
