= John James Knowlton =

American politician

John James Knowlton was a member of the Wisconsin State Assembly.

== Biography ==
Knowlton was born on July 17, 1841, in Wales, New York. During the American Civil War, he served with the 29th Wisconsin Volunteer Infantry Regiment of the Union Army. He died of stomach cancer and complications on May 9, 1903.

== Political career ==
Knowlton was a member of the Assembly during the 1876 and 1877 sessions as an Independent Democrat. Other position he held include Chairman, similar to Mayor, of Seymour, Outagamie County, Wisconsin, in 1870 and from 1872 to 1875 and Butte, Montana City Councilman.
