= Andrew G. Miller =

19th century American judge for the Eastern District of Wisconsin

The Honorable Andrew G. Miller
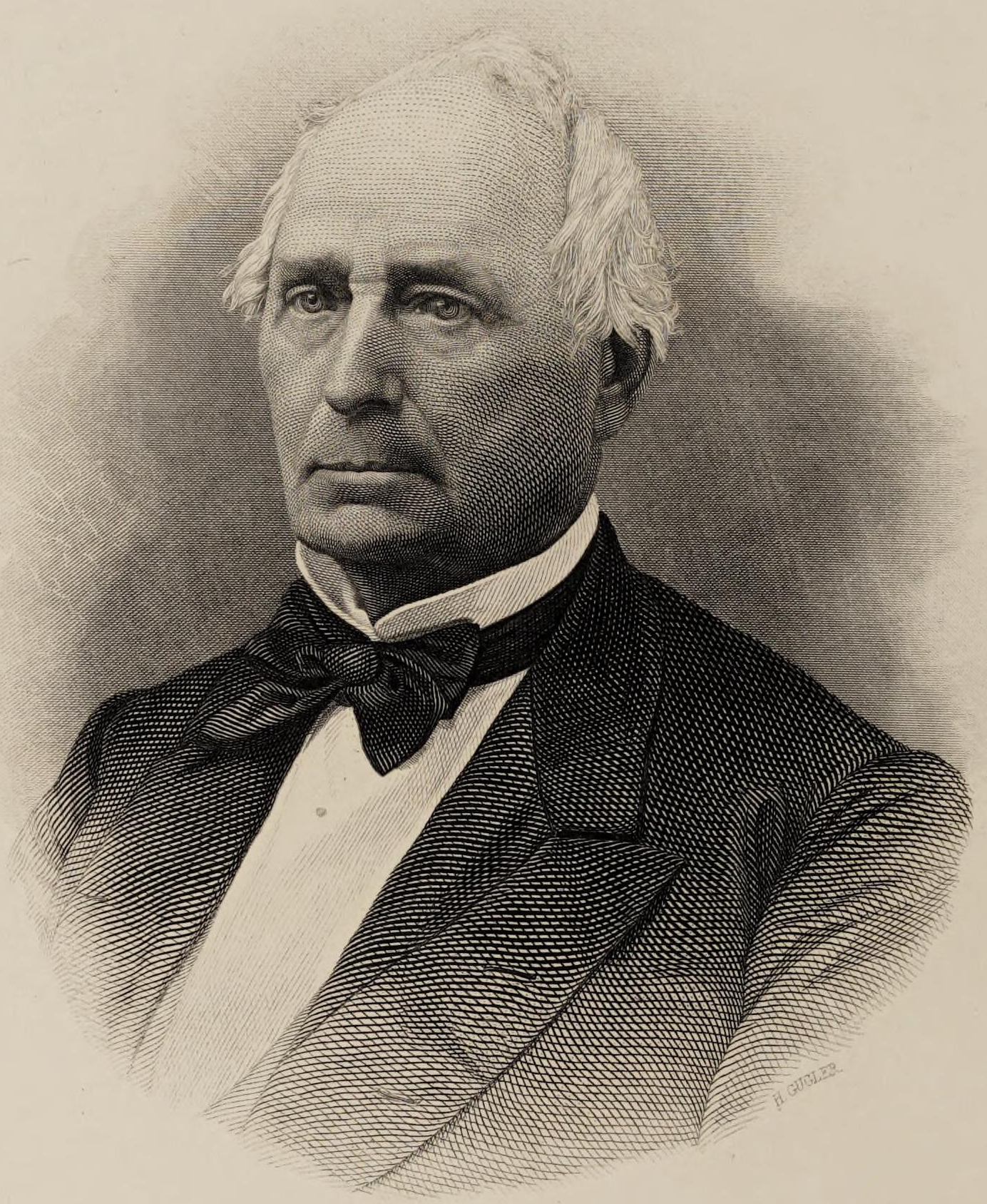

United States District Judge for the Eastern District of Wisconsin
- In office June 30, 1870 – January 1, 1873
- Appointed by: operation of law
- Preceded by: Seat established by 16 Stat. 171
- Succeeded by: James Henry Howe

United States District Judge of the District of Wisconsin
- In office June 12, 1848 – June 30, 1870
- Appointed by: James K. Polk
- Preceded by: Seat established by 9 Stat. 56
- Succeeded by: Seat abolished

Justice of the Supreme Court of the Wisconsin Territory
- In office November 8, 1838 – June 12, 1848
- Appointed by: Martin Van Buren
- Preceded by: William C. Frazer
- Succeeded by: Seat abolished

Personal details
- Born: Andrew Galbraith Miller; September 18, 1801 Carlisle, Pennsylvania, US
- Died: September 30, 1874 (aged 73) Milwaukee, Wisconsin, US
- Resting place: Forest Home Cemetery; Milwaukee, Wisconsin
- Spouse: Caroline E. Kurtz (m. 1827; died 1886)
- Children: 3
- Education: Dickinson College; Washington & Jefferson College (B.A.) read law
- Profession: lawyer, judge
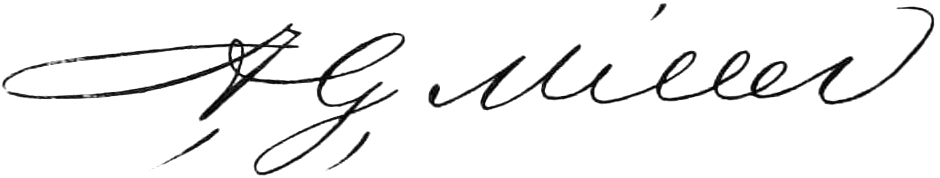
- Signature

Andrew Galbraith Miller (September 18, 1801 – September 30, 1874) was an American lawyer, jurist, and Wisconsin pioneer. He was the first and only United States district judge of the United States District Court for the District of Wisconsin, which existed from the time Wisconsin achieved statehood in 1848 until the district was split into eastern and western districts in 1870. At that time, Miller transitioned to become the first district judge for the Eastern District of Wisconsin, serving until his retirement in January 1873. Prior to Wisconsin statehood, he served as a justice of the Supreme Court of Wisconsin Territory.

== Education and career ==
Born on September 18, 1801, in Carlisle, Pennsylvania, Miller attended Dickinson College and received a Bachelor of Arts degree in 1819 from Washington College (now Washington & Jefferson College), then read law in 1822. He entered private practice in Gettysburg, Pennsylvania, from 1822 to 1838, and served as Attorney General of Pennsylvania. On November 8, 1838, he was commissioned Associate Justice of the Supreme Court of the Wisconsin Territory by President Martin Van Buren and served in that role until Wisconsin became a state.

== Federal judicial service ==
Following the State of Wisconsin's admission to the Union on May 28, 1848, Miller was nominated by President James K. Polk on June 12, 1848, to the United States District Court for the District of Wisconsin, to a new seat authorized by 9 Stat. 56. He was confirmed by the United States Senate on June 12, 1848, and received his commission the same day. When Wisconsin was split into an Eastern and Western district, in 1870, Miller was reassigned by operation of law to the United States District Court for the Eastern District of Wisconsin on June 30, 1870, to a new seat authorized by 16 Stat. 171. His service terminated on January 1, 1873, due to his retirement. Miller was the last federal judge in active service to have been appointed by President Polk.

=== Notable cases ===
During the difficult pre-American Civil War era, Miller upheld the Fugitive Slave Act of 1850 and federal jurisdiction in the Sherman Booth and John Rycraft cases (1854–1855). He also laid down important legal precedents concerning foreclosure of railroad properties and the organization of new companies in cases involving the La Crosse and Milwaukee Railroad, the Milwaukee and St. Paul Railroad, and other railroad companies.

== Personal life ==
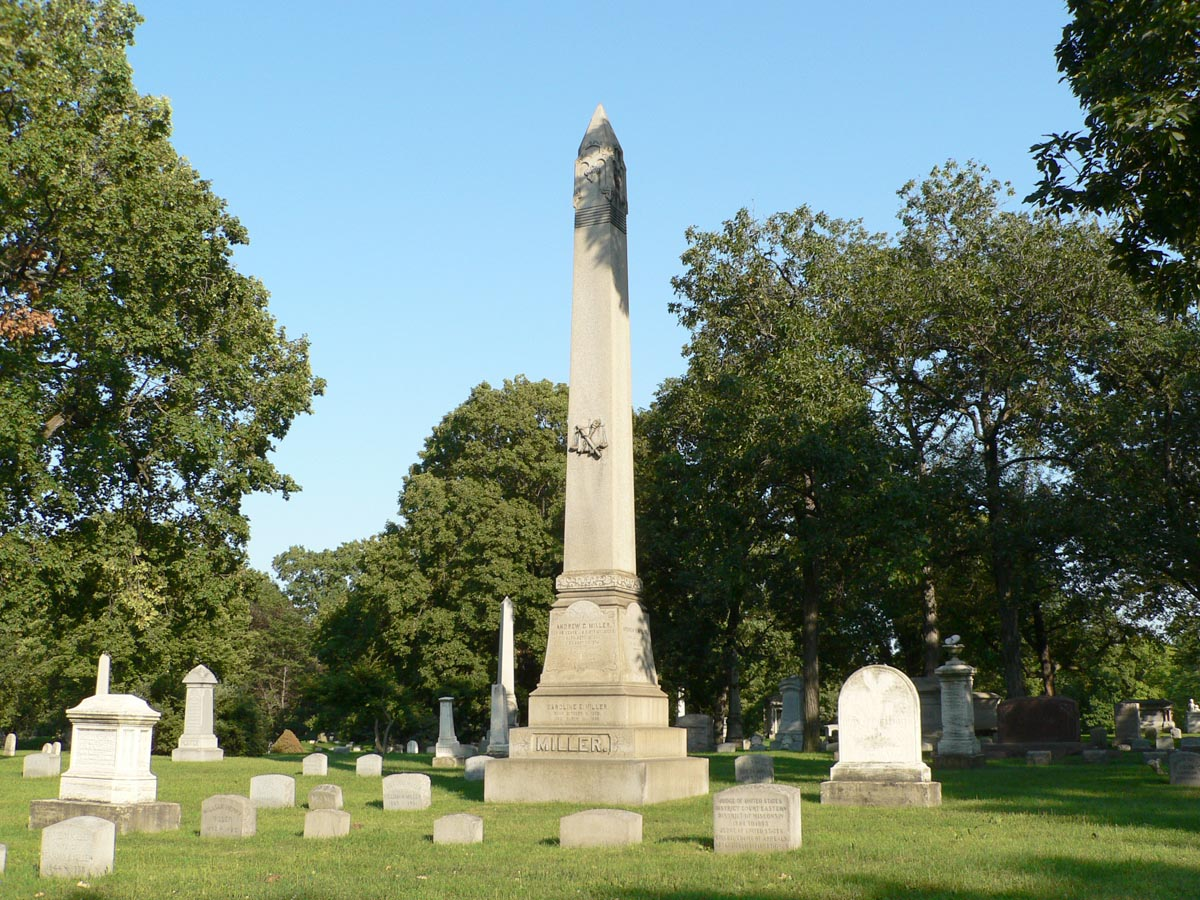
Gravesite in Forest Home Cemetery

Miller was descended from Irish American immigrants who settled in the Province of Pennsylvania in the colonial era. His father, Matthew Miller, was a volunteer in the Pennsylvania militia during the War of 1812.

In 1827, Miller married Caroline E. Kurtz of Harrisburg, Pennsylvania. Her brother was Benjamin Kurtz, who helped to establish the Lutheran church in America. Miller and his wife had at least three sons, though only two survived him.

Andrew G. Miller died on September 30, 1874, in Milwaukee, Wisconsin. He was interred at Forest Home Cemetery in Milwaukee.

Legal offices
Preceded by William C. Frazer	Justice of the Supreme Court of the Wisconsin Territory; 1838 – 1848	Succeeded by Seat abolished
Preceded by Seat established by 9 Stat. 56	United States District Judge for the District of Wisconsin; 1848 – 1870	Succeeded by Seat abolished
Preceded by Seat established by 16 Stat. 171	United States District Judge for the Eastern District of Wisconsin; 1870 – 1873	Succeeded by James Henry Howe
