= Charles Henry De Groat =

Union Army officer in the American Civil War

- Born: April 3, 1838; Cortland, New York
- Died: August 15, 1904 (aged 66); Fond du Lac, Wisconsin
- Military career
- Allegiance: United States
- Branch: United States Army; Union Army
- Rank: Brigadier General
- Unit: 32nd Wisconsin Volunteer Infantry Regiment
- Conflicts: American Civil War; Atlanta campaign Sherman's March to the Sea; Battle of Bentonville

Charles Henry De Groat (April 3, 1838 – August 15, 1904) was a colonel in the Union Army during the American Civil War who was nominated and confirmed for appointment to the grade of brevet brigadier general in 1866.

== Biography ==
De Groat was born on April 3, 1838, in Cortland, New York. In 1852, he moved to Fond du Lac, Wisconsin. De Groat later became Clerk of Fond du Lac County, Wisconsin. He died on August 15, 1904, in Fond du Lac, Wisconsin.

== Military career ==
De Groat originally joined the Army in 1861. The following year, he returned to Fond du Lac and raised the 32nd Wisconsin Volunteer Infantry Regiment. In 1864, he was promoted to colonel and assumed command of the regiment during the Atlanta campaign. He later took part in Sherman's March to the Sea and the Battle of Bentonville. He was mustered out of the volunteers on May 15, 1865. On January 13, 1866, President Andrew Johnson nominated De Groat for appointment to the grade of brevet brigadier general of volunteers to rank from March 13, 1865, and the United States Senate confirmed the appointment on March 12, 1866.
